= List of American films of 1997 =

This is a list of American films released in 1997.

== Box office ==
The highest-grossing American films released in 1997, by domestic box office gross revenue, are as follows:

Highest-grossing films of 1997
Rank	Title	Distributor	Domestic gross
1	Titanic	Paramount Pictures/ 20th Century Fox	$600,788,188
2	Men in Black	Sony Pictures Entertainment	$250,690,539
3	The Lost World: Jurassic Park	Universal Pictures	$229,086,679
4	Liar Liar	Universal Pictures	$181,410,615
5	Air Force One	Sony Pictures Entertainment	$172,956,409
6	As Good as It Gets	Sony Pictures Entertainment	$148,478,011
7	Good Will Hunting	Miramax Films	$138,433,435
8	My Best Friend's Wedding	Sony Pictures Entertainment	$127,120,029
9	Tomorrow Never Dies	MGM	$125,304,276
10	Face/Off	Paramount Pictures	$112,276,146

== January–March ==
Opening		Title	Production company	Cast and crew	Ref.
J A N U A R Y	10	The Relic	Paramount Pictures	Peter Hyams (director); Amy Holden Jones, John Raffo, Rick Jaffa, Amanda Silver (screenplay); Penelope Ann Miller, Tom Sizemore, Linda Hunt, James Whitmore, Clayton Rohner, Chi Muoi Lo, Robert Lesser, Lewis Van Bergen, Francis X. McCarthy, Constance Towers, Audra Lindley, John Kapelos, Tico Wells, Gene Davis, David Proval, Jophery Brown, Don Harvey, Thomas Ryan, Diane Robin, Mike Bacarella, Lyn Alicia Henderson, John DiSanti	
J A N U A R Y	10	Turbulence	Metro-Goldwyn-Mayer / Rysher Entertainment	Robert Butler (director); Jonathan Brett (screenplay); Ray Liotta, Lauren Holly, Héctor Elizondo, Catherine Hicks, Rachel Ticotin, Brendan Gleeson, Ben Cross, Jeffrey DeMunn, Grand L. Bush	
J A N U A R Y	11	Dead Silence	HBO Pictures / Alliance Communications	Daniel Petrie Jr. (director); Donald E. Stewart (screenplay); James Garner, Kim Coates, Marlee Matlin, Lolita Davidovich, Charles Martin Smith, Kenneth Welsh, James Villemaire, Gary Basaraba, Barclay Hope, Vanessa Vaughan, Blu Mankuma, Mimi Kuzyk, Scott Speedman, John Bourgeois, Neil Crone, Craig Eldridge, Adrian Hough, Daniel Petrie Jr., Arnold Pinnock, Ted Whittall, Barry Pepper, Linda Thorson	
J A N U A R Y	17	Albino Alligator	Miramax Films / Motion Picture Corporation of America	Kevin Spacey (director); Christian Forte (screenplay); Matt Dillon, Faye Dunaway, Gary Sinise, William Fichtner, Viggo Mortensen, John Spencer, Skeet Ulrich, M. Emmet Walsh, Joe Mantegna, Frankie Faison, Melinda McGraw, Jeff Hoffman	
J A N U A R Y	17	Beverly Hills Ninja	TriStar Pictures / Motion Picture Corporation of America	Dennis Dugan (director); Mark Feldberg, Mitch Klebanoff (screenplay); Chris Farley, Nicollette Sheridan, Nathaniel Parker, Robin Shou, Soon-Tek Oh, Chris Rock, Keith Cooke Hirabayashi, Will Sasso, François Chau, Jason Tobin, John P. Farley, Kevin Farley, Billy Connolly, Patrick Breen, Steve Terada	
J A N U A R Y	17	Metro	Touchstone Pictures / Caravan Pictures / Roger Birmbaum Productions	Thomas Carter (director); Randy Feldman (screenplay); Eddie Murphy, Michael Rapaport, Michael Wincott, Carmen Ejogo, Art Evans, Denis Arndt, Paul Ben-Victor, Kim Miyori, Donal Logue, James Carpenter	
J A N U A R Y	21	Hurricane Streets	United Artists	Morgan J. Freeman (director/screenplay); Brendan Sexton III, Antoine McLean, Mtume Gant, Carlo Alban, David Roland Frank, Adrian Grenier, Lynn Cohen, L. M. Kit Carson, Shawn Elliott, Jose Zuniga, Edie Falco, Heather Matarazzo	
J A N U A R Y	24	Fierce Creatures	Universal Pictures	Fred Schepisi, Robert Young (directors); John Cleese (screenplay); Kevin Kline, Jamie Lee Curtis, John Cleese, Michael Palin, Robert Lindsay, Ronnie Corbett, Carey Lowell, Bille Brown, Derek Griffiths, Maria Aitken, Cynthia Cleese, Richard Ridings, Gareth Hunt, Tom Georgeson, John Bardon, Jack Davenport	
J A N U A R Y	24	In Love and War	New Line Cinema	Richard Attenborough (director); Allan Scott, Dimitri Villard, Clancy Sigal, Anna Hamilton Phelan (screenplay); Sandra Bullock, Chris O'Donnell, Mackenzie Astin, Margot Steinberg, Alan Bennett, Ingrid Lacey, Emilio Bonucci, Terence Sash, Carlo Croccolo, Vincenzo Nicoli, Tara Hugo, Gigi Vivan, Giuseppe Bonato, Allegra Di Carpegna, Diane Witter, Mindy Lee Raskin, Tracy Hostmyer, Tim McDonell	
J A N U A R Y	24	Prefontaine	Hollywood Pictures	Steve James (director/screenplay); Eugene Corr (screenplay); Jared Leto, Ed O'Neill, R. Lee Ermey, Amy Locane, Breckin Meyer, Lindsay Crouse, Brian McGovern, Kurtwood Smith, Laurel Holloman	
J A N U A R Y	24	Zeus and Roxanne	Metro-Goldwyn-Mayer / Rysher Entertainment	George T. Miller (director); Tom Benedek (screenplay); Steve Guttenberg, Kathleen Quinlan, Arnold Vosloo, Miko Hughes, Dawn McMillan, Majandra Delfino, Jessica Howell, Tacquira LaTouche, Duchess Tomasello, Shannon K. Foley, Jim R. Coleman, Alvin Farmer, Justin Humphrey	
J A N U A R Y	29	Gridlock'd	Gramercy Pictures	Vondie Curtis-Hall (director/screenplay); Tim Roth, Tupac Shakur, Lucy Liu, Thandie Newton, Charles Fleischer, Bokeem Woodbine, Howard Hesseman, John Sayles, Eric Payne, Tom Towles, Tom Wright, Billie Neal, James Pickens Jr., Debra Wilson, Rusty Schwimmer, Richmond Arquette, Elizabeth Peña, Kasi Lemmons, Vondie Curtis-Hall	
J A N U A R Y	31	Johns	First Look International	Scott Silver (director/screenplay); David Arquette, Lukas Haas, John C. McGinley, Keith David, Wilson Cruz, Josh Schaefer, Sydney Lassick, Christopher Gartin, Alanna Ubach, N'Bushe Wright, Richard T. Jones, Richard Kind, Elliott Gould, Terrence Dashon Howard, Nicky Katt, Louis Mustillo, Arliss Howard, Nina Siemaszko, Craig Bierko	
J A N U A R Y	31	Meet Wally Sparks	Largo Entertainment / JVC / Trimark Pictures	Peter Baldwin (director); Harry Basil, Rodney Dangerfield (screenplay); Rodney Dangerfield, Debi Mazar, Michael Weatherly, Cindy Williams, Alan Rachins, Burt Reynolds, David Ogden Stiers, Lisa Thornhill, Glenn Walker Harris Jr., Eamonn Roche, Lenny Clarke, Rita McKenzie, Mark L. Taylor, Gilbert Gottfried, Julia Sweeney, George Wallace, Sandy Helberg, Sir Mix-a-Lot, Ron Jeremy, Tony Danza, Barry Nolan, John Melendez, Karen Duffy, Lewis Arquette, Lesley-Anne Down, Michael Rooker, Michael Bolton, Jay Leno, Geraldo Rivera, Roseanne Barr, Jerry Springer, Morton Downey Jr., Sally Jessy Raphael, Alana Stewart, Rolonda Watts, John Henson, Tim Allen, Bob Saget, George Hamilton	
J A N U A R Y	31	Shadow Conspiracy	Hollywood Pictures / Cinergi Pictures	George P. Cosmatos (director); Adi Hasak, Ric Gibbs (screenplay); Charlie Sheen, Donald Sutherland, Linda Hamilton, Stephen Lang, Ben Gazzara, Sam Waterston, Nicholas Turturro, Charles Cioffi, Stanley Anderson, Theodore Bikel, Paul Gleason, Terry O'Quinn, Gore Vidal, Dey Young	
J A N U A R Y	31	Star Wars (Special Edition) (re-release)	20th Century Fox / Lucasfilm	George Lucas (director/screenplay); Mark Hamill, Harrison Ford, Carrie Fisher, Peter Cushing, Alec Guinness, Anthony Daniels, Kenny Baker, Peter Mayhew, James Earl Jones, David Prowse, Phil Brown, Shelagh Fraser, Jack Purvis, Eddie Byrne, Denis Lawson, Garrick Hagon, Don Henderson, Leslie Schofield, Richard LeParmentier, Alex McCrindle, Alfie Curtis, Peter Geddis, Michael Leader, Robert Clarke, Patrick Jordan, Drewe Henley, Jack Klaff, William Hootkins, Angus MacInnes, Jeremy Sinden, Scott Beach, Paul Blake, Peter Diamond, Harry Fielder, Steve Gawley, Joe Johnston, Derek Lyons, Rick McCallum, Grant McCune, Lorne Peterson, Shane Rimmer, George Roubicek, Peter Sumner, Malcolm Tierney, Phil Tippett, Larry Ward, Bill Weston, Steve 'Spaz' Williams, Fred Wood	
J A N U A R Y	31	Waiting for Guffman	Sony Pictures Classics	Christopher Guest (director/screenplay); Eugene Levy (screenplay); Christopher Guest, Eugene Levy, Fred Willard, Catherine O'Hara, Parker Posey, Lewis Arquette, Bob Balaban, Matt Keeslar, Michael Hitchcock, Larry Miller, David Cross, Linda Kash, Brian Doyle-Murray, Paul Benedict, Paul Dooley, Deborah Theaker, Don Lake, Turk Pipkin, Miriam Flynn, CJ Vanston, Kathy Lamkin, Bob Odenkirk	
F E B R U A R Y	7	The Beautician and the Beast	Paramount Pictures	Ken Kwapis (director); Todd Graff (screenplay); Fran Drescher, Timothy Dalton, Ian McNeice, Patrick Malahide, Lisa Jakub, Michael Lerner, Adam LaVorgna, Phyllis Newman, Heather DeLoach, Tamara Mello, Daniel R. Escobar, Billy Brown, Vincent Schiavelli, Marianne Muellerleile, Edmund Cambridge, Todd Graff, Michael Horton, Stephen Marcus	
F E B R U A R Y	7	Dante's Peak	Universal Pictures	Roger Donaldson (director); Leslie Bohem (screenplay); Pierce Brosnan, Linda Hamilton, Charles Hallahan, Grant Heslov, Elizabeth Hoffman, Jeremy Foley, Jamie Renée Smith, Arabella Field, Tzi Ma, Bill Bolender, Lee Garlington, David Lipper, Peter Jason	
F E B R U A R Y	7	The Pest	TriStar Pictures / The Bubble Factory	Paul Miller (director); David Bar Katz (screenplay); John Leguizamo, Jeffrey Jones, Edoardo Ballerini, Freddy Rodriguez, Tammy Townsend, Aries Spears, Charles Hallahan, Tom McCleister, Joe Morton, Ivonne Coll, Pat Skipper	
F E B R U A R Y	7	SubUrbia	Sony Pictures Classics / Castle Rock Entertainment	Richard Linklater (director); Eric Bogosian (screenplay); Jayce Bartok, Amie Carey, Nicky Katt, Ajay Naidu, Parker Posey, Giovanni Ribisi, Samia Shoaib, Dina Spybey, Steve Zahn	
F E B R U A R Y	12	Dangerous Ground	New Line Cinema / Ghettobird Productions / Cube Vision Productions	Darrell Roodt (director/screenplay); Greg Latter (screenplay); Ice Cube, Elizabeth Hurley, Ving Rhames, Ron Smerczak, Robin B. Smith, Sechaba Morojele, Eric Miyeni, Greg Latter, Thokozani Nkosi	
F E B R U A R Y	14	Absolute Power	Columbia Pictures / Castle Rock Entertainment	Clint Eastwood (director); William Goldman (screenplay); Clint Eastwood, Gene Hackman, Ed Harris, Laura Linney, Judy Davis, Scott Glenn, E. G. Marshall, Dennis Haysbert, Melora Hardin, Kenneth Welsh, Penny Johnson Jerald, Richard Jenkins, Mark Margolis	
F E B R U A R Y	14	Fools Rush In	Columbia Pictures	Andy Tennant (director); Katherine Reback, Joan Taylor (screenplay); Matthew Perry, Salma Hayek, Jon Tenney, Jill Clayburgh, Carlos Gómez, Tomas Milian, Siobhan Fallon, John Bennett Perry, Stanley DeSantis, Suzanne Cryer, Anne Betancourt, Garret Davis, Annie Combs, Annetta Ray	
F E B R U A R Y	14	That Darn Cat	Walt Disney Pictures	Bob Spiers (director); Scott Alexander, Larry Karaszewski (screenplay); Christina Ricci, Doug E. Doug, Dean Jones, George Dzundza, Peter Boyle, Michael McKean, Bess Armstrong, Dyan Cannon, John Ratzenberger, Megan Cavanagh, Estelle Parsons, Rebecca Schull, Tom Wilson, Brian Haley, Mark Christopher Lawrence, Rebecca Koon, Wilbur Fitzgerald	
F E B R U A R Y	14	Touch	United Artists	Paul Schrader (director/screenplay); Bridget Fonda, Christopher Walken, Skeet Ulrich, Tom Arnold, Gina Gershon, Lolita Davidovich, Janeane Garofalo, Paul Mazursky, Richard Schiff, Conchata Ferrell, William Newman, Brett Hinkley	
F E B R U A R Y	14	Vegas Vacation	Warner Bros. Pictures / Jerry Weintraub Productions	Stephen Kessler (director); Elisa Bell (screenplay); Chevy Chase, Beverly D'Angelo, Randy Quaid, Ethan Embry, Marisol Nichols, Miriam Flynn, Shae D'lyn, Juliette Brewer, Wallace Shawn, Christie Brinkley, Julia Sweeney, Wayne Newton, Siegfried & Roy, Toby Huss, Sid Caesar, Jerry Weintraub	
F E B R U A R Y	21	Blood and Wine	Fox Searchlight Pictures	Bob Rafelson (director); Alison Cross, Nick Villiers (screenplay); Jack Nicholson, Stephen Dorff, Jennifer Lopez, Judy Davis, Michael Caine, Harold Perrineau, Robyn Peterson, Mike Starr, John Seitz, Marc Macaulay, Dan Daily, Thom Christopher, Mario Ernesto Sánchez, Antoni Corone	
F E B R U A R Y	21	The Empire Strikes Back (Special Edition) (re-release)	20th Century Fox / Lucasfilm	Irvin Kershner (director); Leigh Brackett, Lawrence Kasdan (screenplay); Mark Hamill, Harrison Ford, Carrie Fisher, Billy Dee Williams, David Prowse, James Earl Jones, Anthony Daniels, Kenny Baker, Peter Mayhew, Frank Oz, Alec Guinness, Jeremy Bulloch, John Hollis, Jack Purvis, Des Webb, Clive Revill, Kenneth Colley, Julian Glover, Michael Sheard, Michael Culver, Milton Johns, Mark Jones, Bruce Boa, Christopher Malcolm, Denis Lawson, Richard Oldfield, John Morton, Ian Liston, John Ratzenberger, Jack McKenzie, Norwich Duff, Brigitte Kahn, Bob Anderson, Richard Bonehill, Tony Clarkin, Peter Diamond, Marjorie Eaton, Mike Edmonds, Harrison Ellenshaw, Stuart Fell, Mike Houston, Paul Jerricho, Arve Juritzen, Michael Leader, Joe Johnston, Ralph McQuarrie, Terry Richards, Deep Roy, Treat Williams, Jason Wingreen, Sheb Wooley	
F E B R U A R Y	21	Lost Highway	October Films	David Lynch (director/screenplay); Barry Gifford (screenplay); Bill Pullman, Patricia Arquette, Balthazar Getty, Robert Blake, Natasha Gregson Wagner, Gary Busey, Robert Loggia, Richard Pryor, Lisa Boyle, Michael Massee, Jack Nance, Jack Kehler, Henry Rollins, Gene Ross, Scott Coffey, John Roselius, Lou Eppolito, Jennifer Syme, Marilyn Manson, Twiggy Ramirez, Giovanni Ribisi, Michael Shamus Wiles, Mink Stole, Leonard Termo, Heather Stephens, Greg Travis, Leslie Bega, David Lynch	
F E B R U A R Y	21	Rosewood	Warner Bros. Pictures / Peters Entertainment	John Singleton (director); Gregory Poirier (screenplay); Jon Voight, Ving Rhames, Don Cheadle, Bruce McGill, Loren Dean, Esther Rolle, Michael Rooker, Elise Neal, Bridgid Coulter, Robert Patrick, Catherine Kellner, Akosua Busia, Paul Benjamin, Kevin Jackson, Mark Boone Junior, Muse Watson, Badja Djola, Kathryn Meisle, Jaimz Woolvett, Vanessa Baden, Andrew "JR" Tarver, Brett Rice, Ric Reitz, Ken Sagoes, Marc Macaulay, Macon McCalman	
F E B R U A R Y	22	Miss Evers' Boys	HBO NYC Productions / Anasazi Productions	Joseph Sargent (director); Walter Bernstein (screenplay); Alfre Woodard, Laurence Fishburne, Craig Sheffer, Joe Morton, Obba Babatundé, Von Coulter, Thom Gossom Jr., Ossie Davis, E.G. Marshall, Robert Benedetti, Peter Stelzer, Donzaleigh Abernathy, Tommy Cresswell, Judson Vaughn, Larry Black, Kiki Shepard	
F E B R U A R Y	25	Leprechaun 4: In Space	Trimark Pictures / Vidmark Entertainment / Blue Rider Productions	Brian Trenchard-Smith (director); Dennis Pratt (screenplay); Warwick Davis, Brent Jasmer, Jessica Collins, Guy Siner, Gary Grossman, Rebekah Carlton, Tim Colceri, Miguel A. Nunez Jr., Debbe Dunning, Michael Cannizzo, Rick Peters, Geoff Meed, Ladd York, James W. Quinn	
F E B R U A R Y	26	Booty Call	Columbia Pictures	Jeff Pollack (director); Takashi Bufford (screenplay); Jamie Foxx, Tommy Davidson, Vivica A. Fox, Tamala Jones, Art Malik, Bernie Mac, David Hemblen, Amanda Tapping, Gedde Watanabe, Ric Young	
F E B R U A R Y	28	Donnie Brasco	TriStar Pictures / Mandalay Entertainment	Mike Newell (director); Paul Attanasio (screenplay); Al Pacino, Johnny Depp, Michael Madsen, Bruno Kirby, James Russo, Anne Heche, Željko Ivanek, Gerry Becker, Robert Miano, Brian Tarantina, Rocco Sisto, Zach Grenier, Walt MacPherson, Larry Romano, Terry Serpico, Gretchen Mol, Tony Lip, Val Avery, Tim Blake Nelson, Paul Giamatti, Katie Sagona, Andrew Parks, Denise Faye, Frank Pesce, Randy Jurgensen, Frank Bonsangue, Teresa Giudice, Garry Pastore, Dale Resteghini, Joseph Rigano, Vinny Vella, Ronnie Farer, George Angelica, Madison Arnold	
F E B R U A R Y	28	Hard Eight	The Samuel Goldwyn Company	Paul Thomas Anderson (director/screenplay); Philip Baker Hall, John C. Reilly, Gwyneth Paltrow, Samuel L. Jackson, Philip Seymour Hoffman, Robert Ridgely, Melora Walters, F. William Parker	
F E B R U A R Y	28	Smilla's Sense of Snow	Fox Searchlight Pictures	Bille August (director); Ann Biderman (screenplay); Julia Ormond, Gabriel Byrne, Richard Harris, Robert Loggia, Vanessa Redgrave, Jim Broadbent, Tom Wilkinson, Bob Peck, David Hayman, Peter Capaldi, Mario Adorf, Erik Holmey, Matthew Marsh, Jürgen Vogel, Charlotte Bradley	
M A R C H	5	The Daytrippers	Cinépix Film Properties	Greg Mottola (director/screenplay); Stanley Tucci, Hope Davis, Pat McNamara, Anne Meara, Parker Posey, Liev Schreiber, Campbell Scott, Marcia Gay Harden, Douglas McGrath, Peter Askin	
M A R C H	7	The Eighth Day	Gramercy Pictures / PolyGram Filmed Entertainment / Working Title Films	Jaco Van Dormael (director/screenplay); Daniel Auteuil, Pascal Duquenne, Miou-Miou, Henri Garcin, Isabelle Sadoyan, Hélène Roussel, Juliette Van Dormael, Dominic Gould, Josse De Pauw, Olivier Gourmet, Gérard Hernandez, Michele Maes, Fabienne Loriaux, Alice Van Dormael, Didier De Neck, Marie-Pierre Meinzel, Sabrina Leurquin, Laszlo Harmati	
M A R C H	7	Good Luck	Moki	Richard LaBrie (director); Bob Comfort (screenplay); Gregory Hines, Vincent D'Onofrio, Max Gail, James Earl Jones	
M A R C H	7	Jungle 2 Jungle	Walt Disney Pictures / TF1 International	John Pasquin (director); Bruce A. Evans, Raynold Gideon (screenplay); Tim Allen, Martin Short, Sam Huntington, Lolita Davidovich, David Ogden Stiers, JoBeth Williams, Valerie Mahaffey, Leelee Sobieski, Luis Ávalos, Frankie J. Galasso, Carole Shelley, Bob Dishy, Dominic Keating, Rondi Reed, Michael Mastro, Joan Copeland, Jack McGee, Adam LeFevre, John Tormey, John Pasquin, Oni Faida Lampley	
M A R C H	7	Private Parts	Paramount Pictures / Rysher Entertainment / Northern Lights Entertainment	Betty Thomas (director); Len Blum, Michael Kalesniko (screenplay); Howard Stern, Robin Quivers, Mary McCormack, Fred Norris, Paul Giamatti, Gary Dell'Abate, Jackie Martling, Carol Alt, Richard Portnow, Kelly Bishop, Henry Goodman, Jonathan Hadary, Paul Hecht, Allison Janney, Michael Murphy, Reni Santoni, Lee Wilkof, Amber Smith, Jenna Jameson, John Michael Bolger, John Stamos, Chris Barron, Flava Flav, Hammer, Ted Nugent, Ozzy Osbourne, John Popper, Slash, Dee Snider, Tiny Tim, Steven Gilborn, Curtis McClarin, Richard B. Shull, Evan Roberts, Jennifer Gareis, Scott Cohen, Wendy Hoopes, Michael C. Gwynne, Silas Weir Mitchell, Adam LeFevre, Janine Lindemulder, Scott Lawrence, Christine Tucci, Kim Chan, Nick Wyman, Stephen Pearlman, Peter Jacobson, Leslie Bibb, Peter Maloney, David Letterman, Alison Stern, AC/DC, Susan Pratt, Sarah Hyland, "Stuttering" John Melendez, George "Crackhead Bob" Harvey, Nicole Bass, Camille Donatacci	
M A R C H	14	City of Industry	Orion Pictures / Largo Entertainment	John Irvin (director); Ken Solarz (screenplay); Harvey Keitel, Stephen Dorff, Timothy Hutton, Famke Janssen, Wade Dominguez, Michael Jai White, Lucy Liu, Reno Wilson, Dana Barron, Tamara Clatterbuck, François Chau, Flex Alexander, Cyrus Farmer, Evzen Kolar, Jonathan Schmock, John Koyama, Steven Ho, Elliott Gould	
M A R C H	14	Love Jones	New Line Cinema	Theodore Witcher (director/screenplay); Larenz Tate, Nia Long, Isaiah Washington, Lisa Nicole Carson, Bill Bellamy, Leonard Roberts, Bernadette L. Clarke, Khalil Kain, Cerall Duncan, Simon James, Oona Hart, Jaqueline Fleming, Marie-Françoise Theodore, Reginald Gibson, Everette Dean, Benjamin LeVert, Malik Yusef	
M A R C H	14	Return of the Jedi (Special Edition) (re-release)	20th Century Fox / Lucasfilm	Richard Marquand (director); Lawrence Kasdan, George Lucas (screenplay); Mark Hamill, Harrison Ford, Carrie Fisher, Billy Dee Williams, Anthony Daniels, David Prowse, James Earl Jones, Ian McDiarmid, Kenny Baker, Peter Mayhew, Frank Oz, Alec Guinness, Sebastian Shaw, Michael Pennington, Kenneth Colley, Michael Carter, Denis Lawson, Tim Rose, Dermot Crowley, Caroline Blakiston, Warwick Davis, Jeremy Bulloch, Femi Taylor, Jack Purvis, Mike Edmonds, Malcolm Dixon, Debbie Lee Carrington, Sadie Corre, Tony Cox, Phil Fondacaro, Michael Gilden, Kiran Shah, Felix Silla, John Altman, Erik Bauersfeld, Richard Bonehill, Paul Brooke, Ben Burtt, Tony Clarkin, Ronny Cush, Peter Diamond, David Field, Ernie Fosselius, Alf Joint, Richard Marquand, Hilton McRae, Mike Quinn, Deep Roy, Phil Tippett, Larry Ward, Robert Watts, Pat Welsh, Sheb Wooley, Annie Arbogast, Jane Busby, Nicki Reade	
M A R C H	14	The Substance of Fire	Miramax Films	Daniel Sullivan (director); Jon Robin Baitz (screenplay); Tony Goldwyn, Timothy Hutton, Sarah Jessica Parker, Ron Rifkin, Gil Bellows, Elizabeth Franz, Ronny Graham, Debra Monk, Roger Rees, Eric Bogosian, Lee Grant, Viola Davis, Gregory Burke, Adolph Green, Alec Mapa, John Christopher Jones, Dick Latessa, Patrick Page, Matt McGrath, Gina Torres, George Morfogen	
M A R C H	15	The Second Civil War	HBO Pictures / Baltimore Pictures	Joe Dante (director); Martyn Burke (screenplay); Beau Bridges, Joanna Cassidy, Phil Hartman, James Earl Jones, James Coburn, Dan Hedaya, Elizabeth Peña, Denis Leary, Ron Perlman, Kevin Dunn, Shelley Malil, Brian Keith, Kevin McCarthy, Dick Miller, William Schallert, Catherine Lloyd Burns, Jerry Hardin, Larry "Flash" Jenkins, Ben Masters, Roger Corman, Rance Howard, Anthony Lee, Andrew Hill Newman, Robert Picardo, Neil Roberts, Hank Stratton, Alexandra Wilson, Scott Atkinson, Belinda Balaski, Eve Brenner, Jordan Bridges, Sean Lawlor, Dwight D. Eisenhower, Ronald Reagan, Nancy Reagan, Marshall Manesh, Ron Ostrow	
M A R C H	18	Honey, We Shrunk Ourselves	Walt Disney Home Video	Dean Cundey (director); Karey Kirkpatrick, Nell Scovell, Joel Hodgson (screenplay); Rick Moranis, Eve Gordon, Bug Hall, Robin Bartlett, Stuart Pankin, Allison Mack, Jake Richardson, Mila Kunis, Erica Luttrell, Lisa Wilhoit, Ashleigh Sterling, Jojo Adams, Theodore Borders, Bryson Aust, Laura Dunn	
M A R C H	21	Liar Liar	Universal Pictures / Imagine Entertainment	Tom Shadyac (director); Paul Guay, Stephen Mazur (screenplay); Jim Carrey, Maura Tierney, Justin Cooper, Cary Elwes, Anne Haney, Jennifer Tilly, Swoosie Kurtz, Jason Bernard, Mitchell Ryan, Amanda Donohoe, Eric Pierpoint, Chip Mayer, Cheri Oteri, Randall "Tex" Cobb, Ben Lemon, Jarrad Paul, Marianne Muellerleile, Krista Allen, Don Keefer, Randy Oglesby, Charlie Dell, Terry Rhoads, Ed Trotta, Skip O'Brien, Tony Carreiro, Anthony Lee, Rick Hill, Matthew Arkin, Colleen Fitzpatrick, Michael Kostroff, Ashley Monique Clark, Sara Paxton, Patricia Belcher, Christopher Darden, Gene LeBell, Paul Wight, Spice Williams-Crosby	
M A R C H	21	Selena	Warner Bros. Pictures	Gregory Nava (director/screenplay); Jennifer Lopez, Edward James Olmos, Constance Marie, Jon Seda, Lupe Ontiveros, Jackie Guerra, Jacob Vargas, Alexandra Meneses, Ruben Gonzalez, Seidy López, Pete Astudillo, Ricky Vela, Don Shelton	
M A R C H	26	Cats Don't Dance	Warner Bros. Pictures / Turner Feature Animation	Mark Dindal (director); Roberts Gannaway, Cliff Ruby, Elana Lesser (screenplay); Scott Bakula, Jasmine Guy, Ashley Peldon, Kathy Najimy, John Rhys-Davies, George Kennedy, René Auberjonois, Betty Lou Gerson, Hal Holbrook, Don Knotts, Natalie Cole, Lindsay Ridgeway, Mark Dindal, Frank Welker, David Johansen, Dee Bradley Baker, Tony Pope, Peter Renaday, Catherine Battistone, Bob Bergen, Debi Derryberry, Bill Farmer, Barbara Goodson, Mona Marshall, Patricia Parris, Doug Stone	
M A R C H	26	The Devil's Own	Columbia Pictures	Alan J. Pakula (director); David Aaron Cohen, Vincent Patrick, Kevin Jarre (screenplay); Harrison Ford, Brad Pitt, Margaret Colin, Rubén Blades, Treat Williams, George Hearn, Mitchell Ryan, Natascha McElhone, Paul Ronan, Simon Jones, Julia Stiles, David O'Hara, David Wilmot, Anthony Brophy, Gabrielle Reidy, Hassan Johnson, Greg Salata, Malachy McCourt, Rob Mac, Chance Kelly, Victor Slezak, Damien Leake, Wilson Cleveland, Ashley Carin, Kelly Singer, Martin Dunne, Ciaran O'Reilly	
M A R C H	28	The 6th Man	Touchstone Pictures / Mandeville Films	Randall Miller (director); Christopher Reed, Cynthia Carle (screenplay); Marlon Wayans, Kadeem Hardison, David Paymer, Michael Michele, Kevin Dunn, Gary Jones, Lorenzo Orr, Vladimir Cuk, Travis Ford, Chris Spencer, Kirk Baily, Harold Sylvester, Octavia L. Spencer, Paul Ben-Victor, Jody Savin, Randall Miller, Will Sasso, Flex Alexander, Greg Collins, Kevin McNulty, Dick Vitale, Bill Walton, Brad Nessler, John Thompson, Nolan Richardson, Jerry Tarkanian, George Raveling, Billy Packer, Todd Bozeman, Jim Harrick, Chris Marlowe, Lute Olson, Jack Karuletwa, Saundra McClain, Scott LaRose	
M A R C H	28	B*A*P*S	New Line Cinema	Robert Townsend (director); Troy Beyer (screenplay); Halle Berry, Martin Landau, Ian Richardson, Natalie Desselle, Troy Beyer, Pierre Edwards, A.J. Johnson, Bernie Mac, Faizon Love, Rudy Ray Moore, Debra Wilson, Downtown Julie Brown, Heavy D, Idalis DeLeon, Howard Hewett, LL Cool J, Leon, Dennis Rodman, Barry Sobel, Luigi Amodeo, Jonathan Fried, Eric Poppick	
M A R C H	28	Turbo: A Power Rangers Movie	20th Century Fox / Saban Entertainment	Shuki Levy (director/screenplay), David Winning (director); Shell Danielson (screenplay); Johnny Yong Bosch, Nakia Burrise, Jason David Frank, Catherine Sutherland, Amy Jo Johnson, Steve Cardenas, Austin St. John, Jason Narvy, Paul Schrier, Blake Foster, Hilary Shepard, Gregg Bullock, Richard Genelle, Bob Manahan, Richard Wood, Lex Lang, J. B. Levine, David Umansky, Mike Deak, Barbara Goodson	

== April–June ==
Opening		Title	Production company	Cast and crew	Ref.
A P R I L	4	Anna Karenina	Warner Bros. Pictures / Icon Productions	Bernard Rose (director/screenplay); Sophie Marceau, Sean Bean, Alfred Molina, Mia Kirshner, James Fox, Fiona Shaw, Danny Huston, Saskia Wickham, Phyllida Law, David Schofield, Jennifer Caron Hall, Anna Calder-Marshall, Petr Shelokhonov, Vernon Dobtcheff, Larisa Kuznetsova, Jeremy Sheffield, Justine Waddell, Valerie Braddell	
A P R I L	4	Chasing Amy	Miramax Films	Kevin Smith (director/screenplay); Ben Affleck, Joey Lauren Adams, Jason Lee, Dwight Ewell, Jason Mewes, Kevin Smith, Ethan Suplee, Scott Mosier, Casey Affleck, Brian O'Halloran, Matt Damon, Carmen Llywelyn, Guinevere Turner, Illeana Douglas, Walter Flanagan, Joe Quesada, Michael Allred, Damian Young	
A P R I L	4	Double Team	Columbia Pictures / Mandalay Entertainment	Tsui Hark (director); Don Jakoby, Paul Mones (screenplay); Jean-Claude Van Damme, Dennis Rodman, Paul Freeman, Mickey Rourke, Natacha Lindinger	
A P R I L	4	Inventing the Abbotts	20th Century Fox / Fox 2000 Pictures / Imagine Entertainment	Pat O'Connor (director); Ken Hixon (screenplay); Liv Tyler, Joaquin Phoenix, Billy Crudup, Jennifer Connelly, Joanna Going, Will Patton, Kathy Baker, Barbara Williams, Alessandro Nivola, Michael Keaton, Zoe McLellan	
A P R I L	4	The Saint	Paramount Pictures / Rysher Entertainment	Phillip Noyce (director); Jonathan Hensleigh, Wesley Strick (screenplay); Val Kilmer, Elisabeth Shue, Rade Šerbedžija, Valery Nikolaev, Henry Goodman, Alun Armstrong, Michael Byrne, Yevgeni Lazarev, Irina Apeksimova, Lucija Šerbedžija, Lev Prygunov, Charlotte Cornwell, Tommy Flanagan, Egor Pazenko, Adam Smith, Roger Moore, David Schneider, William Hope, Emily Mortimer	
A P R I L	4	That Old Feeling	Universal Pictures / The Bubble Factory	Carl Reiner (director); Leslie Dixon (screenplay); Bette Midler, Dennis Farina, Paula Marshall, Gail O'Grady, David Rasche, James Denton, Danny Nucci, Jayne Eastwood, Michael J. Reynolds, Joan Luchak, Lulu Franklin, Ian D. Clark, Blu Mankuma	
A P R I L	11	Anaconda	Columbia Pictures	Luis Llosa (director); Hans Bauer, Jim Cash, Jack Epps Jr. (screenplay); Jennifer Lopez, Ice Cube, Jon Voight, Eric Stoltz, Owen Wilson, Kari Wührer, Jonathan Hyde, Vincent Castellanos, Danny Trejo, Frank Welker	
A P R I L	11	Grosse Pointe Blank	Hollywood Pictures / Caravan Pictures	George Armitage (director); Tom Jankiewicz, D. V. DeVincentis, Steve Pink, John Cusack (screenplay); John Cusack, Minnie Driver, Alan Arkin, Dan Aykroyd, Joan Cusack, Jeremy Piven, Hank Azaria, Barbara Harris, Mitchell Ryan, K. Todd Freeman, Michael Cudlitz, Benny Urquidez, Carlos Jacott, Jenna Elfman, Steve Pink, Brent Armitage, Ann Cusack, Belita Moreno, K. K. Dodds, Bill Cusack	
A P R I L	11	Keys to Tulsa	Polygram Filmed Entertainment / ITC Entertainment	Leslie Greif (director); Harley Peyton (screenplay); Eric Stoltz, Cameron Diaz, Mary Tyler Moore, James Coburn, Deborah Kara Unger, Michael Rooker, Peter Strauss, James Spader, Joanna Going, Randy Graff, Marco Perella, Dennis Letts, Josh Ridgway	
A P R I L	11	Paradise Road	Fox Searchlight Pictures	Bruce Beresford (director/screenplay); Glenn Close, Frances McDormand, Pauline Collins, Cate Blanchett, Jennifer Ehle, Julianna Margulies, Wendy Hughes, Johanna ter Steege, Elizabeth Spriggs, Pamela Rabe, Clyde Kusatsu, Stan Egi, David Chung, Sab Shimono, Penne Hackforth-Jones, Pauline Chan, Lisa Hensley, Susie Porter, Tessa Humphries, Marta Dusseldorp, Aden Young, Vincent Ball, Nicholas Hammond, Robert Grubb, Arthur Dignam, Julie Anthony	
A P R I L	17	Kissed	Orion Pictures / Goldwyn Entertainment Company	Lynne Stopkewich (director/screenplay); Angus Fraser, Barbara Gowdy (screenplay); Molly Parker, Peter Outerbridge, Jay Brazeau, Robert Thurston, Tim Dixon, Natasha Morley, Jessie Winter Mudie, James Timmons, Joe Maffei, Annabel Kershaw	
A P R I L	18	8 Heads in a Duffel Bag	Orion Pictures	Tom Schulman (director/screenplay); Joe Pesci, Andy Comeau, Kristy Swanson, George Hamilton, Dyan Cannon, David Spade, Todd Louiso, Anthony Mangano, Michelle Vieth, Joe Basile, Ernestine Mercer	
A P R I L	18	McHale's Navy	Universal Pictures / The Bubble Factory	Bryan Spicer (director); Peter Crabbe, Andy Rose (screenplay); Tom Arnold, Dean Stockwell, Debra Messing, David Alan Grier, Tim Curry, Ernest Borgnine, Bruce Campbell, French Stewart, Danton Stone, Brian Haley, Henry Cho, Scott Cleverdon, Tommy Chong, John Pyper-Ferguson, Bryan Spicer, Erick Avari, James Hong, Anthony Jesse Cruz, Honorato Magaloni, Guillermo Ríos, Anthony Azizi	
A P R I L	18	Murder at 1600	Warner Bros. Pictures / Regency Enterprises	Dwight H. Little (director); Wayne Beach, David Hodgin (screenplay); Wesley Snipes, Diane Lane, Dennis Miller, Daniel Benzali, Alan Alda, Ronny Cox, Diane Baker, Tate Donovan, Harris Yulin, Tom Wright, Nicholas Pryor, Charles Rocket, Nigel Bennett, Tony Nappo, Tamara Gorski, Mary Moore	
A P R I L	20	In the Gloaming	HBO NYC Productions	Christopher Reeve (director); Will Scheffer (screenplay); Glenn Close, Bridget Fonda, Whoopi Goldberg, Robert Sean Leonard, David Strathairn, Annie Starke, Will Reeve	
A P R I L	25	A Brother's Kiss	First Look Studios	Seth Zvi Rosenfeld (director/screenplay); Nick Chinlund, Michael Raynor, John Leguizamo, Cathy Moriarty, Rosie Perez, Michael Rapaport, Marisa Tomei, Scott Cohen, Arthur J. Nascarella, Adrian Pasdar, Jennifer Esposito, Justin Pierce, Seth Zvi Rosenfeld, Richard Palmer, Joshua Danowsky, Talent Harris	
A P R I L	25	Female Perversions	October Films	Susan Streitfeld (director/screenplay); Tilda Swinton, Amy Madigan, Karen Sillas, Frances Fisher, Laila Robins, Paulina Porizkova, Clancy Brown, Laila Robins, John Diehl, Dale Shuger, Sandy Martin, Marcia Cross, John Cassini, Shawnee Smith, Lisa Jane Persky	
A P R I L	25	Romy and Michele's High School Reunion	Touchstone Pictures	David Mirkin (director); Robin Schiff (screenplay); Mira Sorvino, Lisa Kudrow, Janeane Garofalo, Alan Cumming, Julia Campbell, Mia Cottet, Kristin Bauer, Elaine Hendrix, Vincent Ventresca, Camryn Manheim, Justin Theroux, Jacob Vargas, Neil Dickson, Ricky Paull Goldin, Deezer D, Pat Crawford Brown, Rick Pasqualone, Tate Taylor	
A P R I L	25	Shiloh	Legacy Releasing / Zeta Entertainment / Utopia Pictures / Good Dog Productions / Carl Borack Productions	Dale Rosenbloom (director/screenplay); Michael Moriarty, Blake Heron, Scott Wilson, Ann Dowd, J. Madison Wright, Bonnie Bartlett, Rod Steiger, Montrose Hagins, Amzie Strickland, Shira Roth, Tori Wright, Rachel Winfree, Frannie	
A P R I L	25	Volcano	20th Century Fox / Fox 2000 Pictures	Mick Jackson (director); Jerome Armstrong, Billy Ray (screenplay); Tommy Lee Jones, Anne Heche, Gaby Hoffmann, Don Cheadle, Keith David, Jacqueline Kim, John Corbett, Michael Rispoli, John Carroll Lynch, Dayton Callie, Susie Essman, Richard Schiff, Valente Rodriguez, Marcello Thedford, Bert Kramer, Bo Eason, James MacDonald, Lou Myers, Gareth Williams, Mickey Cottrell, M. Darnell Suttles, Brian Markinson, Robert Ray Wisdom, Mother Love, Ron Perkins, Danny Comden, Michael McGrady, Michole Briana White, Harvey Levin, Shepard Smith, Jeremy Thompson, Jane Velez-Mitchell, Dorothy Lucey, Jillian Barberie	
A P R I L	27	Stephen King's The Shining	ABC / Lakeside Productions / Warner Bros. Television	Mick Garris (director); Stephen King (screenplay); Steven Weber, Rebecca De Mornay, Courtland Mead, Wil Horneff, Melvin Van Peebles, Pat Hingle, Elliott Gould, John Durbin, Stanley Anderson, Shawnee Smith, Joyce Bulifant, Mick Garris, Stephen King, Sam Raimi, Lisa Thornhill, Frank Darabont, Christa Faust, Richard Christian Matheson, David J. Schow, Miguel Ferrer, Michael O'Neill, Cynthia Garris, Jan Van Sickle, P.G. Sturges	
A P R I L	30	Children of the Revolution	Miramax Films	Peter Duncan (director/screenplay); Judy Davis, Sam Neill, Richard Roxburgh, Rachel Griffiths, Geoffrey Rush, F. Murray Abraham, Russell Kiefel, John Gaden, Marshall Napier, Fiona Press, Alex Menglet, Rowan Woods, Ron Haddrick, Heather Mitchell, Paul Livingston, Dennis Watkins, Steve Abbott, Harold Hopkins, Roy Billing, Paul Lyneham, Mikhail Gorbachev, Václav Havel, Ronald Reagan, Joseph Stalin, Ben McIvor, Ken Radley, Barry Langrishe, Graham Ware Jr., Robbie McGregor, Matt Potter, Sam Willcock, Philip Dodd	
M A Y	2	Austin Powers: International Man of Mystery	New Line Cinema / Moving Pictures	Jay Roach (director); Mike Myers (screenplay); Mike Myers, Elizabeth Hurley, Michael York, Mimi Rogers, Robert Wagner, Seth Green, Mindy Sterling, Will Ferrell, Paul Dillon, Charles Napier, Fabiana Udenio, Monet Mazur, Clint Howard, Elya Baskin, Neil Mullarkey, Joe Son, Larry Thomas, Cindy Margolis, Barbara Moore, Brian George, Steve Monroe, Patrick Bristow, Jim McMullan, Robin Gammell, Burt Bacharach, Tom Arnold, Lois Chiles, Carrie Fisher, Susanna Hoffs, Mike Judge, Rob Lowe, Michael McDonald, Cheri Oteri, Christian Slater, Matthew Sweet, Patricia Tallman	
M A Y	2	Breakdown	Paramount Pictures / Dino De Laurentiis Company	Jonathan Mostow (director/screenplay); Sam Montgomery (screenplay); Kurt Russell, J. T. Walsh, Kathleen Quinlan, M. C. Gainey, Jack Noseworthy, Ritch Brinkley, Moira Harris, Rex Linn, Jack McGee, Thomas Kopache	
M A Y	2	Broken English	Sony Pictures Classics	Gregor Nicholas (director/screenplay); Johanna Pigott (screenplay); Aleksandra Vujcic, Julian Arahanga, Rade Šerbedžija, Marton Csokas, Temuera Morrison, Madeline McNamara, Jing Zhao, Li Yang, Elizabeth Mavric	
M A Y	2	Commandments	Gramercy Pictures / Northern Lights Entertainment	Daniel Taplitz (director/screenplay); Aidan Quinn, Courteney Cox, Anthony LaPaglia, Shirl Bernheim, Peter Jacobson, Pamela Gray, Louis Zorich, Scott Sowers, Jack Gilpin, Amy Sedaris, Stephen Pearlman, Tom Aldredge, Alice Drummond, John Tormey, Michael Badalucco, Joanna Going, Pat McNamara, Stephen Singer	
M A Y	2	Truth or Consequences, N.M.	Triumph Films / Ink Slinger Productions	Kiefer Sutherland (director); Greg Mirman (screenplay); Vincent Gallo, Mykelti Williamson, Kiefer Sutherland, Kevin Pollak, Kim Dickens, Grace Phillips, Rod Steiger, Martin Sheen, James McDaniel, Rick Rossovich, John C. McGinley, Max Perlich, Scott Christopher, Marshall Bell, Peter Iacangelo, Don Shanks	
M A Y	2	Warriors of Virtue	Metro-Goldwyn-Mayer	Ronny Yu (director); Michael Vickerman, Hugh Kelley (screenplay); Angus Macfadyen, Mario Yedidia, Marley Shelton, Jack Tate, Doug Jones, Doug Parker, Don W. Lewis, Dale Wilson, J. Todd Adams, Adrienne Corcoran, Kathleen Barr, Chao-Li Chi, Michael J. Anderson, Tom Towles, Lee Arenberg, Dennis Dun, Roy Cebellos, Jay Brazeau, Jason Hamer, Garry Chalk, Ian James Corlett, Teryl Rothery, Rickey D'Shon Collins, Michael Dubrow, Ying Qu, Venus Terzo	
M A Y	7	Knots Landing: Back to the Cul-de-Sac	CBS	Bill Corcoran (director); Ann Marcus, Lisa Seidman, Julie Sayres (screenplay); William Devane, Kevin Dobson, Michele Lee, Donna Mills, Ted Shackelford, Joan Van Ark, Michelle Phillips, Stacy Galina, Tonya Crowe, Brian Austin Green, Kim Lankford, Claudia Lonow, Patrick Petersen, Nicollette Sheridan, Emily Ann Lloyd, Francesca Marie Smith, Victoria Ann Lewis, Jane A. Rogers, Jessica D. Stone, Jason Clarke, Terri Hoyos, Guy Siner, Marshall Manesh, Bridget Flanery, Joseph Cousins, John Loughlin, Carlos Cantú, Ken Weiler, Jeremy Roberts, William Ontiveros, J. Patrick McCormack, Michael Woods	
M A Y	9	Fathers' Day	Warner Bros. Pictures / Silver Pictures	Ivan Reitman (director); Lowell Ganz, Babaloo Mandel (screenplay); Robin Williams, Billy Crystal, Julia Louis-Dreyfus, Nastassja Kinski, Charlie Hofheimer, Bruce Greenwood, Dennis Burkley, Haylie Johnson, Charles Rocket, Patti D'Arbanville, Jared Harris, Louis Lombardi, Alan Berger, Tom Verica, Jennifer Crystal Foley, Jason Reitman, Ricky Harris, Paul Herman, Christopher Jaymes, Catherine Reitman, Claudette Wells, Susan Traylor, Dana Gould, Meagen Fay, Harry E. Northup, Lee Weaver, Sugar Ray, The Muffs, Chris M. Allport, Mel Gibson, Mary McCormack	
M A Y	9	Nowhere	Fine Line Features	Gregg Araki (director/screenplay); James Duval, Rachel True, Nathan Bexton, Debi Mazar, Chiara Mastroianni, Beverly D'Angelo, Kathleen Robertson, Joshua Gibran Mayweather, Jordan Ladd, Christina Applegate, Sarah Lassez, Guillermo Díaz, Jeremy Jordan, Alan Boyce, Jason Simmons, Charlotte Rae, Ryan Phillippe, Heather Graham, Stephane Sednaoui, Teresa Hill, Denise Richards, Kevin Light, Scott Caan, Thyme Lewis, Traci Lords, Shannen Doherty, Rose McGowan, John Ritter, Petro Nicholas, Mena Suvari, Eve Plumb, Christopher Knight, Lauren Tewes, David Leisure, John Enos III, Nicolette Gato, Brian Buzzini, Aaron Smith, Tres Trash Temperilli, Sara Jane, Devon Odessa, Staci Keanan, Gibby Haynes, Brewer twins, Peter Alexander, Brian Heinberg, Gregg Araki	
M A Y	9	Twin Town	Gramercy Pictures / PolyGram Filmed Entertainment	Kevin Allen (director/screenplay); Paul Durden (screenplay); Llŷr Ifans, Rhys Ifans, Huw Ceredig, Rachel Scorgie, Di Botcher, Dougray Scott, Dorien Thomas, William Thomas, Jenny Evans, Sue Roderick, Brian Hibbard, Morgan Hopkins, Buddug Williams, Ronnie Williams, Boyd Clack	
M A Y	9	Underworld	Trimark Pictures	Roger Christian (director); Larry Bishop (screenplay); Denis Leary, Joe Mantegna, Annabella Sciorra, Larry Bishop, Abe Vigoda, Robert Costanzo, Traci Lords, Jimmie F. Skaggs, James Tolkan, Heidi Schanz, Cristi Conaway, Angela Jones, Michael Benyaer, Dave "Squatch" Ward, Michael David Simms, Amy Moon, Marc Baur	
M A Y	14	Sprung	Trimark Pictures	Rusty Cundieff (director/screenplay); Darin Scott (screenplay); Tisha Campbell, Rusty Cundieff, Paula Jai Parker, Joe Torry, John Witherspoon, Jennifer Lee, Clarence Williams III, Nick LaTour, Darin Scott, Isabel Sanford, Angela Means, Yolanda "Yo-Yo" Whitaker, Sherman Hemsley, Reynaldo Rey, Mark Christopher Lawrence, Freda Payne	
M A Y	16	Love! Valour! Compassion!	Fine Line Features	Joe Mantello (director); Terrence McNally (screenplay); Jason Alexander, Stephen Spinella, Stephen Bogardus, Randy Becker, John Benjamin Hickey, Justin Kirk, John Glover	
M A Y	16	Night Falls on Manhattan	Paramount Pictures / Spelling Films	Sidney Lumet (director/screenplay); Andy García, Ian Holm, James Gandolfini, Lena Olin, Richard Dreyfuss, Sheik Mahmud-Bey, Ron Leibman, Colm Feore, Dominic Chianese, Paul Guilfoyle, Vincent Pastore, Frank Vincent, Bobby Cannavale, Marcia Jean Kurtz, Jude Ciccolella, Bill Boggs, Richard Bright, Jim Moody, Socorro Santiago, Donna Hanover, Jack Cafferty, Kaity Tong, Adam Alexi-Malle, Vic Noto, John Randolph Jones, Chuck Pfeiffer, Teddy Coluca	
M A Y	16	The Van	Fox Searchlight Pictures / Beacon Pictures / Deadly Films / BBC Films	Stephen Frears (director); Roddy Doyle (screenplay); Colm Meaney, Donal O'Kelly, Ger Ryan, Caroline Rothwell, Neilí Conroy, Rúaidhrí Conroy, Brendan O'Carroll, Stuart Dunne, Laurie Morton, Marie Mullen, Jon Kenny	
M A Y	17	Weapons of Mass Distraction	HBO Pictures	Stephen Surjik (director); Larry Gelbart (screenplay); Gabriel Byrne, Ben Kingsley, Mimi Rogers, Jeffrey Tambor, Illeana Douglas, Paul Mazursky, Chris Mulkey, R. Lee Ermey, Caroline Aaron, Jason Lee, Christina Pickles, Tom Wright, Randall Arney, Ben Bode, L. Scott Caldwell, Patrick Fabian, Alex Kingston, Jordan Ladd, Heidi Mark, Adam Tomei, Peter White, Kathy Baker, Tina Arning, Richard Chaves, Jerry Hauck, John Heffron, Larissa Laskin, Sung Hi Lee, Todd Newton	
M A Y	23	Addicted to Love	Warner Bros. Pictures	Griffin Dunne (director); Robert Gordon (screenplay); Meg Ryan, Matthew Broderick, Kelly Preston, Tchéky Karyo, Maureen Stapleton, Remak Ramsay, Lee Wilkof, Dominick Dunne, Larry Pine, Daniel Dae Kim, Bill Timoney	
M A Y	23	The Lost World: Jurassic Park	Universal Pictures / Amblin Entertainment	Steven Spielberg (director); David Koepp (screenplay); Jeff Goldblum, Julianne Moore, Pete Postlethwaite, Arliss Howard, Vince Vaughn, Vanessa Lee Chester, Richard Attenborough, Peter Stormare, Harvey Jason, Richard Schiff, Thomas F. Duffy, Joseph Mazzello, Ariana Richards, Thomas Rosales Jr., Camilla Belle, Robin Sachs, Ross Partridge, Ian Abercrombie, Geno Silva, Harry Hutchinson, Billy Brown, Katy Boyer, David Koepp, Bernard Shaw, Michael Chinyamurindi, Henry Kingi, Michael Milhoan, Mark Pellegrino, Eli Roth, Steven Spielberg, Cyd Strittmatter, Alex Miranda, Colton James, Carey Eidel, J. Patrick McCormack	
M A Y	30	Gone Fishin'	Hollywood Pictures / Caravan Pictures	Christopher Cain (director); J. J. Abrams, Jill Mazursky (screenplay); Joe Pesci, Danny Glover, Rosanna Arquette, Lynn Whitfield, Willie Nelson, Nick Brimble, Gary Grubbs, Carol Kane, Raynor Scheine, Maury Chaykin	
M A Y	30	'Til There Was You	Paramount Pictures / Lakeshore Entertainment	Scott Winant (director); Winnie Holzman (screenplay); Jeanne Tripplehorn, Dylan McDermott, Sarah Jessica Parker, Jennifer Aniston, Craig Bierko, Christine Ebersole, Michael Tucker, Michael Moertl, Karen Allen, Kale Browne, Alice Drummond, Ken Olin, Patrick Malahide, Nina Foch, Reg Rogers, Susan Walters, Kasi Lemmons, Steve Antin, Richard Fancy, Ian Gomez, Matt Roth, Karen Mayo-Chandler, Anthony Guidera, John Hawkes, Jack Kruschen, Danielle Keaton, Julio Oscar Mechoso, Annabelle Gurwitch, Yvonne Zima, Madeline Zima, Amanda Fuller, Janel Moloney	
M A Y	30	Trial and Error	New Line Cinema	Jonathan Lynn (director); Sara Bernstein, Gregory Bernstein (screenplay); Michael Richards, Jeff Daniels, Charlize Theron, Jessica Steen, Austin Pendleton, Rip Torn, Alexandra Wentworth, Jennifer Coolidge, Lawrence Pressman, Dale Dye, Max Casella	
J U N E	6	Buddy	Columbia Pictures / Jim Henson Pictures / American Zoetrope	Caroline Thompson (director/screenplay); Rene Russo, Robbie Coltrane, Alan Cumming, Irma P. Hall, Paul Reubens, John Aylward, Mimi Kennedy, Frank Collison, Philip Baker Hall, Dane Cook, John Ennis, Peter Elliott, Jerry Nelson, Steve Whitmire, Frank Oz, Dave Goelz, Michelan Sisti, Leif Tilden, Mak Wilson, Frank Welker	
J U N E	6	Con Air	Touchstone Pictures / Jerry Bruckheimer Films	Simon West (director); Scott Rosenberg (screenplay); Nicolas Cage, John Cusack, John Malkovich, Steve Buscemi, Ving Rhames, Colm Meaney, Mykelti Williamson, Rachel Ticotin, Monica Potter, Dave Chappelle, M.C. Gainey, John Roselius, Renoly Santiago, Danny Trejo, Jesse Borrego, Nick Chinlund, Angela Featherstone, José Zúñiga, Landry Allbright, Steve Eastin, Kevin Gage, Ty Granderson Jones, Emilio Rivera, Doug Hutchison, Jeris Lee Poindexter, David Ramsey, Conrad Goode, John Diehl, Don S. Davis, Powers Boothe, Carl Ciarfalio, Mongo Brownlee, Ned Bellamy, John Marshall Jones, Fredric Lehne, Bob Stephenson, Earl Billings, Barbara Sharma, Thomas Rosales Jr., Eddie Perez, Joey Miyashima, Chris Ellis, Dabbs Greer, Dennis Burkley, Scott Rosenberg	
J U N E	13	Hercules	Walt Disney Pictures	Ron Clements, John Musker (directors/screenplay); Barry Johnson (screenplay); Tate Donovan, Danny DeVito, James Woods, Susan Egan, Rip Torn, Samantha Eggar, Bobcat Goldthwait, Matt Frewer, Patrick Pinney, Hal Holbrook, Barbara Barrie, Amanda Plummer, Carole Shelley, Paddi Edwards, Paul Shaffer, Jim Cummings, Wayne Knight, Keith David, Charlton Heston, Lillias White, Cheryl Freeman, LaChanze, Roz Ryan, Vanéese Y. Thomas, Joshua Keaton, Roger Bart, Frank Welker, Mary Kay Bergman, Corey Burton, Kathleen Freeman, Bug Hall, Aaron Michael Metchik, Tawatha Agee, Jack Angel, Bob Bergen, Rodger Bumpass, Jennifer Darling, Debi Derryberry, Bill Farmer, Sherry Lynn, Phil Proctor, Jan Rabson, Fonzi Thornton, Erik von Detten, Robert Gant, Kellen Hathaway, Shelton Becton, Milt Grayson, Mickie McGowan, Denise Pickering, Riley Steiner, Ken Williams	
J U N E	13	Speed 2: Cruise Control	20th Century Fox	Jan de Bont (director); Randall McCormick, Jeff Nathanson (screenplay); Sandra Bullock, Jason Patric, Willem Dafoe, Glenn Plummer, Temuera Morrison, Brian McCardie, Jeremy Hotz, Bo Svenson, Royale Watkins, Tamia, Kimmy Robertson, Christine Firkins, Lois Chiles, Francis Guinan, Michael G. Hagerty, Colleen Camp, Tim Conway, Enrique Murciano, Connie Ray, Patrika Darbo, Richard Speight Jr., Jay Lacopo, Kathryn Rossetter, Joe Morton, UB40	
J U N E	13	Temptress Moon	Miramax Films	Chen Kaige (director/screenplay); Wang Anyi (screenplay); Leslie Cheung, Gong Li, Kevin Lin, He Saifei, David Wu, Zhou Ye Mang, Patrick Tse, Zhou Jie, Zhou Xun, Chang Shi, Lin Lian Kun, Ko Hsiang-ting, Ren Lei, Ying Wang, Lin Ge	
J U N E	13	Ulee's Gold	Orion Pictures	Victor Nuñez (director); Victor Nuñez (screenplay); Peter Fonda, Patricia Richardson, Tom Wood, Christine Dunford, Jessica Biel, Vanessa Zima, Steven Flynn, Dewey Weber, J. Kenneth Campbell, Traber Burns, Ryan Marshall	
J U N E	13	Wedding Bell Blues	BMG Independents	Dana Lustig (director/screenplay); Annette Goliti Gutierrez (screenplay); Illeana Douglas, Paulina Porizkova, Julie Warner, John Corbett, Jonathan Penner, Charles Martin Smith, Richard Edson, Carla Gugino, Debbie Reynolds	
J U N E	14	Path to Paradise: The Untold Story of the World Trade Center Bombing	HBO NYC Productions	Leslie Libman, Larry Williams (directors); Ned Curren (screenplay); Peter Gallagher, Art Malik, Ned Eisenberg, Marcia Gay Harden, Andreas Katsulas, Paul Guilfoyle, Mike Starr, Shaun Toub, Tony Gillan, Sheik Mahmud-Bey, Joe Zaloom, Keith Randolph Smith, Jeffrey DeMunn, Allison Janney, Mike O'Malley, Granville Hatcher, Christopher McCann, Ron Brice, Peter McRobbie, Angela Pietropinto, Marcus Giamatti, Sam Coppola, John Randolph Jones, Marlene Forte, Bruce Kirkpatrick, Manny Siverio, Richard Topol, Tom Neils, Jason Antoon, Al Espinosa, Damian Young, Richmond Hoxie, Michael Badalucco	
J U N E	18	For Roseanna	Fine Line Features	Paul Weiland (director); Saul Turteltaub (screenplay); Jean Reno, Mercedes Ruehl, Polly Walker, Mark Frankel, Trevor Peacock, Fay Ripley, George Rossi	
J U N E	20	Batman & Robin	Warner Bros. Pictures	Joel Schumacher (director); Akiva Goldsman (screenplay); Arnold Schwarzenegger, George Clooney, Chris O'Donnell, Uma Thurman, Alicia Silverstone, Michael Gough, Pat Hingle, John Glover, Elle Macpherson, Vivica A. Fox, Vendela Kirsebom, Jeep Swenson, John Fink, Eric Lloyd, Jon Simmons, Christian Boeving, Michael Paul Chan, Kimberly Scott, Peter "Navy" Tuiasosopo, Harry Van Gorkum, Jack Betts, Jim McMullan, United States Senator Patrick Leahy, Jesse Ventura, Ralf Moeller, Doug Hutchison, Greg Lauren, Dean Cochran, Coolio, Nicky Katt, John Ingle, Michael Bernardo, Marliece Andrada, Johnathan Brownlee, Ryan Allen Carrillo, Corey Haim, Buddy Joe Hooker, Gene LeBell, Deron McBee, Dick Shawn, Spice Williams-Crosby, Elizabeth Sanders, Michael Reid MacKay, Joe Sabatino, Tobias Jelinek	
J U N E	20	My Best Friend's Wedding	TriStar Pictures / Zucker Brothers Productions	P. J. Hogan (director); Ronald Bass (screenplay); Julia Roberts, Dermot Mulroney, Cameron Diaz, Rupert Everett, Philip Bosco, M. Emmet Walsh, Rachel Griffiths, Carrie Preston, Susan Sullivan, Christopher Masterson, Paul Giamatti, Bree Turner, Joseph Sikora, Phillip Ingram, Rose Abdoo, Ned Schmidtke, Charlotte Zucker, Anh Duong, Harry Shearer, Mary-Pat Green, Paul Adelstein, Chelcie Ross	
J U N E	20	The Last Time I Committed Suicide	Tapestry Films / The Kushner-Locke Company	Stephen T. Kay (director/screenplay); Thomas Jane, Keanu Reeves, Adrien Brody, John Doe, Claire Forlani, Jim Haynie, Marg Helgenberger, Lucinda Jenney, Gretchen Mol, Amy Smart, Meadow Sisto	
J U N E	20	Dream with the Fishes	Sony Pictures Classics	Finn Taylor (director/screenplay); David Arquette, Kathryn Erbe, J.E. Freeman, Brad Hunt, Patrick McGaw, Cathy Moriarty	
J U N E	25	Head Above Water	Fine Line Features	Jim Wilson (director); Theresa Marie (screenplay); Harvey Keitel, Cameron Diaz, Craig Sheffer, Billy Zane, Shay Duffin	
J U N E	27	Face/Off	Paramount Pictures / Touchstone Pictures	John Woo (director); Mike Werb, Michael Colleary (screenplay); John Travolta, Nicolas Cage, Joan Allen, Alessandro Nivola, Gina Gershon, Dominique Swain, Nick Cassavetes, Harve Presnell, Colm Feore, John Carroll Lynch, CCH Pounder, Robert Ray Wisdom, Margaret Cho, Thomas Jane, James Denton, Tommy Flanagan, Matt Ross, Danny Masterson, Chris Bauer, Myles Jeffrey, Paul Hipp, Kirk Baltz, Ben Reed, Lisa Boyle, Steve Hytner, John Bloom, Cam Brainard, David Warshofsky, Thomas Rosales Jr.	

== July–September ==
Opening		Title	Production company	Cast and crew	Ref.
J U L Y	2	Men in Black	Columbia Pictures / Amblin Entertainment	Barry Sonnenfeld (director); Ed Solomon (screenplay); Tommy Lee Jones, Will Smith, Linda Fiorentino, Vincent D'Onofrio, Rip Torn, Tony Shalhoub, Siobhan Fallon, Mike Nussbaum, Jon Gries, Sergio Calderon, Carel Struycken, Fredric Lehne, Richard Hamilton, Kent Faulcon, John Alexander, Keith Campbell, Ken Thorley, Patrick Breen, Becky Ann Baker, Sean Whalen, Michael Willis, Willie C. Carpenter, David Cross, Debbie Lee Carrington, Verne Troyer, Tim Blaney, Harsh Nayyar, Mark Setrakian, Brad Abrell, Thom Fountain, Carl J. Johnson, Drew Massey, Lowell Cunningham, Danny DeVito, Newt Gingrich, Karen Lynn Gorney, George Lucas, Isaac Mizrahi, Tony Robbins, Al Roker, Barry Sonnenfeld, Steven Spielberg, Sylvester Stallone, Dionne Warwick	
J U L Y	2	Out to Sea	20th Century Fox	Martha Coolidge (director); Robert Nelson Jacobs (screenplay); Jack Lemmon, Walter Matthau, Dyan Cannon, Brent Spiner, Gloria DeHaven, Elaine Stritch, Estelle Harris, Hal Linden, Donald O'Connor, Edward Mulhare, Rue McClanahan, Joe Viterelli, Alexandra Powers, Sean O'Bryan, Esther Scott, Allan Rich, Concetta Tomei, Carol Barbee, Dale Raoul, Beverly Polcyn, Shaun Toub	
J U L Y	2	Wild America	Warner Bros. Pictures / Morgan Creek Productions	William Dear (director); David Michael Wieger (screenplay); Jonathan Taylor Thomas, Devon Sawa, Scott Bairstow, Frances Fisher, Jamey Sheridan, Tracey Walter, Zack Ward, Danny Glover, Don Stroud, Sonny Shroyer	
J U L Y	9	4 Little Girls	HBO	Spike Lee (director)	
J U L Y	11	Contact	Warner Bros. Pictures	Robert Zemeckis (director); James V. Hart, Michael Goldenberg (screenplay); Jodie Foster, Matthew McConaughey, James Woods, Tom Skerritt, William Fichtner, John Hurt, Angela Bassett, David Morse, Jena Malone, Jake Busey, Rob Lowe, Geoffrey Blake, Max Martini, Steven Ford, David St. James, Marc Macaulay, Tucker Smallwood, Yuji Okumoto, Gerry Griffin, Alex Veadov, Robin Gammell, J.A. Preston, Larry King, Maria Celeste Arraras, Tabitha Soren, Geraldo Rivera, Jay Leno, Natalie Allen, Robert D. Novak, Geraldine A. Ferraro, Ann Druyan, Jill Dougherty, John Holliman, Bobbie Battista, Dee Dee Myers, Bryant Gumbel, Linden Soles, Bernard Shaw, Neil Armstrong, Bill Clinton, Adolf Hitler, Martin Luther King Jr., Douglas MacArthur, Joseph McCarthy, Richard Nixon, Franklin D. Roosevelt, Cenk Uygur, Walter Winchell	
J U L Y	11	This World, Then the Fireworks	Orion Pictures / Largo Entertainment	Michael Oblowitz (director); Larry Gross (screenplay); Billy Zane, Gina Gershon, Sheryl Lee, Rue McClanahan, Seymour Cassel, Will Patton, Richard Edson	
J U L Y	11	A Simple Wish	Universal Pictures / The Bubble Factory	Michael Ritchie (director); Jeff Rothberg (screenplay); Martin Short, Mara Wilson, Kathleen Turner, Robert Pastorelli, Francis Capra, Amanda Plummer, Ruby Dee, Teri Garr, Jonathan Hadary, Deborah Odell, Alan Campbell, Jack McGee, Clare Coulter, Lanny Flaherty, Neil Foster, Jamie Tirelli	
J U L Y	16	George of the Jungle	Walt Disney Pictures / Mandeville Films	Sam Weisman (director); Dana Olsen, Audrey Wells (screenplay); Brendan Fraser, Leslie Mann, Thomas Haden Church, Holland Taylor, John Bennett Perry, Richard Roundtree, Greg Cruttwell, Abraham Benrubi, John Cleese, Keith Scott, Frank Welker, Lauren Bowles, Samantha Harris, Mayor Willie Lewis Brown Jr., Nameer Ed-Kadi, Philip Tan, Leif Tilden, Kelly Miracco, Abdoulaye N'Gom, Michael Chinyamurindi, Lydell M. Cheshier, Afton Smith, Noah John Cardoza, Benjamin John Cardoza, Tom Fisher, Jody St. Michael	
J U L Y	18	Kiss Me, Guido	Paramount Pictures	Tony Vitale (director/screenplay); Nick Scotti, Anthony Barrile, Anthony DeSando, Craig Chester, Domenick Lombardozzi, Molly Price, Christopher Lawford, John Tormey, Antonia Rey, Jennifer Esposito	
J U L Y	18	Mrs. Brown	Miramax Films	John Madden (director); Jeremy Brock (screenplay); Judi Dench, Billy Connolly, Geoffrey Palmer, Antony Sher, Gerard Butler, David Westhead, Richard Pasco, Bridget McConnell, Georgie Glen, Catherine O'Donnell	
J U L Y	18	Nothing to Lose	Touchstone Pictures	Steve Oedekerk (director/screenplay); Martin Lawrence, Tim Robbins, John C. McGinley, Giancarlo Esposito, Michael McKean, Kelly Preston, Susan Barnes, Rebecca Gayheart, Samaria Graham, Marcus T. Paulk, Penny Bae Bridges, Irma P. Hall, Caroline Keenan, Patrick Cranshaw, Steve Oedekerk, Dan Martin, Jim Meskimen, Blake Clark	
J U L Y	18	The Swan Princess: Escape from Castle Mountain	Nest Family Entertainment / Crest Animation Productions	Richard Rich (director); Brian Nissen (screenplay); Michelle Nicastro, Douglas Sills, Doug Stone, Steve Vinovich, James Arrington, Joey Camen, Jake Williamson, Christy Landers, Donald Sage MacKay, Joseph Medrano, Owen Miller, Rosie Mann, Kenneth Cope, Michael Lanning	
J U L Y	23	Star Maps	Fox Searchlight Pictures	Miguel Arteta (director); Douglas Spain, Efrain Figueroa, Kandeyce Jorden, Martha Veléz, Robin Thomas, Zak Penn	
J U L Y	25	Air Force One	Columbia Pictures / Beacon Pictures	Wolfgang Petersen (director); Andrew W. Marlowe (screenplay); Harrison Ford, Gary Oldman, Glenn Close, Wendy Crewson, Paul Guilfoyle, William H. Macy, Liesel Matthews, Dean Stockwell, Elya Baskin, Andrew Divoff, David Vadim, Levan Uchaneishvili, Ilia Volok, Xander Berkeley, Alan Woolf, Tom Everett, Jürgen Prochnow, Donna Bullock, Michael Ray Miller, Carl Weintraub, Spencer Garrett, Bill Smitrovich, Glenn Morshower, David Gianopoulos, Dan Shor, Philip Baker Hall, Richard Doyle, Willard Pugh, Don McManus, J.A. Preston	
J U L Y	25	Box of Moonlight	Largo Entertainment / Lakeshore Entertainment	Tom DiCillo (director/screenplay); John Turturro, Sam Rockwell, Catherine Keener, Lisa Blount, Annie Corley, Dermot Mulroney, Rica Martens, Alexander Goodwin, Stuart Greer, Sam Gleason	
J U L Y	25	Good Burger	Paramount Pictures / Nickelodeon Movies	Brian Robbins (director); Dan Schneider, Kevin Kopelow, Heath Seifert (screenplay); Kenan Thompson, Kel Mitchell, Sinbad, Abe Vigoda, Shar Jackson, Dan Schneider, Jan Schweiterman, Ron Lester, Josh Server, Ginny Schreiber, Linda Cardellini, Shaquille O'Neal, George Clinton, Robert Wuhl, Lori Beth Denberg, Marques Houston, Matt Gallant, Teresa Ganzel, Brian Peck, Hamilton Von Watts, J. August Richards, Kevin Kopelow, Floyd Levine, Carmit Bachar, Kelly Devine, Carmen Electra	
J U L Y	26	Hostile Waters	HBO Pictures	David Drury (director); Troy Kennedy Martin (screenplay); Rutger Hauer, Martin Sheen, Max von Sydow, Colm Feore, Rob Campbell, Harris Yulin, Regina Taylor, John Rothman, Michael Attwell, Dominic Monaghan, Peter Guinness, James E. Kerr, Alexis Denisof, Paul Birchard, Mark Drewry, Denzil Kilvington, Garry Cooper, Frank Baker, Richard Graham, Joachim Paul Assböck, Alexander Wachholz, Todd Boyce, Michael Shannon, Sanja Spengler, Philip Martin Brown	
J U L Y	30	One Eight Seven	Warner Bros. Pictures / Icon Productions	Kevin Reynolds (director); Scott Yagemann (screenplay); Samuel L. Jackson, John Heard, Kelly Rowan, Clifton Collins Jr., Tony Plana, Karina Arroyave, Demetrius Navarro, Lobo Sebastian, Jack Kehler, Jonah Rooney, Method Man, Kathryn Leigh Scott	
A U G U S T	1	Air Bud	Walt Disney Pictures / Keystone Entertainment	Charles Martin Smith (director); Paul Tamasy, Aaron Mendelsohn (screenplay); Michael Jeter, Kevin Zegers, Wendy Makkena, Bill Cobbs, Eric Christmas, Nicola Cavendish, Brendan Fletcher, Norman Browning, Stephen E. Miller, Shayn Solberg, Jessibelle Mather, Kati Mather	
A U G U S T	1	In the Company of Men	Sony Pictures Classics	Neil LaBute (director/screenplay); Aaron Eckhart, Stacy Edwards, Matt Malloy, Mark Rector, Jason Dixie	
A U G U S T	1	Picture Perfect	20th Century Fox	Glenn Gordon Caron (director/screenplay); Arleen Sorkin, Paul Slansky (screenplay); Jennifer Aniston, Jay Mohr, Kevin Bacon, Olympia Dukakis, Illeana Douglas, Matthew Sussman, Kevin Dunn, Faith Prince, Anne Twomey, John Rothman, Meg Gibson, Paul Cassell, Marcia DeBonis, Amelia Campbell, Faran Tahir, Ivar Brogger, Peter McRobbie, Jenna Stern, Bellina Logan, Sean Patrick Thomas, Andrea Bendewald, David Cromwell, Jessica Cushman, Kaley Cuoco, Greg Grunberg	
A U G U S T	1	Spawn	New Line Cinema / Pull Down Your Pants Pictures	Mark A.Z. Dippé (director); Alan B. McElroy (screenplay); John Leguizamo, Michael Jai White, Martin Sheen, Theresa Randle, Nicol Williamson, D.B. Sweeney, Miko Hughes, Melinda Clarke, Sydni Beaudoin, Michael Papajohn, Frank Welker, Todd McFarlane, Robia LaMorte, Chris Coppola, Jack Coleman, Roger Yuan	
A U G U S T	5	Pooh's Grand Adventure: The Search for Christopher Robin	Walt Disney Home Video	Karl Geurs (director/screenplay); Carter Crocker (screenplay); Jim Cummings, John Fiedler, Ken Sansom, Paul Winchell, Peter Cullen, Brady Bluhm, Andre Stojka, Steve Schatzberg, Frankie J. Galasso, David Warner	
A U G U S T	6	Def Jam's How to Be a Player	Gramercy Pictures	Lionel C. Martin (director); Mark Brown, Demetria Johnson (screenplay); Bill Bellamy, Natalie Desselle, Bernie Mac, Elise Neal, Lark Voorhies, Mari Morrow, Pierre Edwards, BeBe Drake, Jermaine 'Huggy' Hopkins, Anthony Johnson, Max Julien, Beverly Johnson, Gilbert Gottfried, Stacii Jae Johnson, J. Anthony Brown, Amber Smith, Marta Cunningham	
A U G U S T	8	Career Girls	October Films / Film Four Distributors	Mike Leigh (director/screenplay); Katrin Cartlidge, Lynda Steadman, Mark Benton, Kate Byers, Andy Serkis, Joe Tucker	
A U G U S T	8	Conspiracy Theory	Warner Bros. Pictures / Silver Pictures	Richard Donner (director); Brian Helgeland (screenplay); Mel Gibson, Julia Roberts, Patrick Stewart, Cylk Cozart, Steve Kahan, Terry Alexander, Pete Koch, Dean Winters, Alex McArthur, Kenneth Tigar, Sean Patrick Thomas, Michael Potts, Saxon Trainor, Leonard Jackson, Donal Gibson, Michael Shamus Wiles, Troy Garity, J. Mills Goodloe, Peter Jacobson, Edita Brychta, Tom McCarthy, Joan Lunden, Rick Hoffman, Bert Remsen, Bill Henderson, Tom Schanley, Richard Donner	
A U G U S T	8	Free Willy 3: The Rescue	Warner Bros. Pictures / Regency Enterprises	Sam Pillsbury (director); John Mattson (screenplay); Jason James Richter, August Schellenberg, Annie Corley, Vincent Berry, Patrick Kilpatrick, Tasha Simms, Peter LaCroix, Stephen E. Miller, Ian Tracey, Matthew Walker, Roger R. Cross, Rick Burgess	
A U G U S T	8	Traveller	October Films / Traveler Production Company L.I.c. / Banner Entertainment / MDP Worldwide	Jack N. Green (director); Jim McGlynn (screenplay); Bill Paxton, Mark Wahlberg, Julianna Margulies, James Gammon, Luke Askew, Danielle Keaton, Nikki DeLoach, Michael Shaner, Rance Howard, Jean Speegle Howard, Jo Ann Pflug, Andrew Porter, Robert Peters, John Bennes, Barbara Rowan, Trenton McDevitt, Moses Gibson, Bonnie Johnson, John Paxton, Jim Flowers, Frederick E. Dann, Walter Cobb, Joanne Pankow, Chuck Kinlaw, Ted Manson	
A U G U S T	13	The Full Monty	Fox Searchlight Pictures	Peter Cattaneo (director); Simon Beaufoy (screenplay); Robert Carlyle, Mark Addy, Tom Wilkinson, Steve Huison, Paul Barber, Hugo Speer, William Snape, Lesley Sharp, Emily Woof, Deirdre Costello, Paul Butterworth, Dave Hill, Bruce Jones, Andrew Livingston, Vinny Dhillon	
A U G U S T	15	Cop Land	Miramax Films	James Mangold (director/screenplay); Sylvester Stallone, Harvey Keitel, Ray Liotta, Robert De Niro, Peter Berg, Janeane Garofalo, Robert Patrick, Michael Rapaport, Annabella Sciorra, Cathy Moriarty, Noah Emmerich, John Spencer, Frank Vincent, Malik Yoba, Arthur Nascarella, Victor Williams, Edie Falco, Mel Gorham, Paul Calderón, Vincent Laresca, Method Man, Deborah Harry, Tony Sirico	
A U G U S T	15	Event Horizon	Paramount Pictures	Paul W. S. Anderson (director); Philip Eisner (screenplay); Laurence Fishburne, Sam Neill, Kathleen Quinlan, Joely Richardson, Richard T. Jones, Jack Noseworthy, Jason Isaacs, Sean Pertwee, Peter Marinker, Holley Chant, Barclay Wright, Noah Huntley, Robert Jezek	
A U G U S T	15	Paperback Romance	Goldwyn Films	Ben Lewin (director/screenplay); Gia Carides, Anthony LaPaglia, Rebecca Gibney, Robyn Nevin, Marshall Napier	
A U G U S T	15	Steel	Warner Bros. Pictures	Kenneth Johnson (director/screenplay); Shaquille O'Neal, Annabeth Gish, Judd Nelson, Richard Roundtree, Irma P. Hall, Ray J, Hill Harper, Kevin Grevioux, Charles Napier, Kerrie Keane, Thom Barry, Rutanya Alda, Eric Pierpoint, Tembi Locke, Gary Graham, John Hawkes, Claire Stansfield, Tim de Zarn, Michael Shamus Wiles, Rick Worthy, Harvey Silver, George Lemore, Eric Poppick, Steven Mattila	
A U G U S T	17	12 Angry Men	Showtime Networks / MGM Television	William Friedkin (director); Reginald Rose (screenplay); Courtney B. Vance, Ossie Davis, George C. Scott, Armin Mueller-Stahl, Dorian Harewood, James Gandolfini, Tony Danza, Jack Lemmon, Hume Cronyn, Mykelti Williamson, Edward James Olmos, William Petersen, Mary McDonnell, Tyrees Allen, Douglas Spain	
A U G U S T	17	Subway Stories: Tales from the Underground	HBO NYC Productions	Jonathan Demme, Craig McKay, Bob Balaban, Patricia Benoit, Seth Rosenfeld, Lucas Platt, Alison Maclean, Abel Ferrara, Ted Demme (directors); Julie Dash (director/screenplay); Adam Brooks, John Guare, Lynn Grossman, Angela Todd, Ken Kelsch, Albert Innaurato, Danny Hoch, Marla Hanson, Joe Viola (screenplay); Sarita Choudhury, Anne Heche, Taral Hicks, Gregory Hines, Danny Hoch, Israel Horovitz, Bonnie Hunt, Bill Irwin, Christine Lahti, Denis Leary, Michael McGlone, Ajay Naidu, Kris 'KRS-One' Parker, Rosie Perez, Michael Rapaport, Mercedes Ruehl, Jerry Stiller, Lili Taylor, Zachary Taylor, Steve Zahn, Kevin Corrigan, N'Bushe Wright, Mekhi Phifer, Peter Sarsgaard, Nicole Ari Parker, Sam Rockwell, Kenny Garrett, Gretchen Mol, Paul Lazar, O.L. Duke, Jeremy Jordan, Steven Randazzo, Tammi Cubilette, Kavitha Ramachandran, Bruklin Harris, Will Hare, George T. Odom	
A U G U S T	22	G.I. Jane	Hollywood Pictures / Caravan Pictures / Roger Birnbaum Productions	Ridley Scott (director); David Twohy, Danielle Alexandra (screenplay); Demi Moore, Viggo Mortensen, Anne Bancroft, Jason Beghe, Daniel von Bargen, Scott Wilson, John Michael Higgins, Kevin Gage, David Warshofsky, David Vadim, Lucinda Jenney, Morris Chestnut, Josh Hopkins, Jim Caviezel, Boyd Kestner, Dimitri Diatchenko, Angel David, Stephen Ramsey	
A U G U S T	22	Leave It to Beaver	Universal Pictures	Andy Cadiff (director); Brian Levant, Lon Diamond (screenplay); Christopher McDonald, Janine Turner, Cameron Finley, Erik von Detten, Adam Zolotin, Erika Christensen, Alan Rachins, Grace Phillips, E.J. de la Pena, Justin Restivo, Geoff Pierson, Louis Martin Braga, Shirley Prestia, Brighton Hertford, Fran Bennett, Matthew Carey, Brenda Song, Barbara Billingsley, Ken Osmond, Frank Bank	
A U G U S T	22	Mimic	Dimension Films / Miramax Films	Guillermo del Toro (director/screenplay); Matthew Robbins (screenplay); Mira Sorvino, Jeremy Northam, Josh Brolin, Charles S. Dutton, Giancarlo Giannini, F. Murray Abraham, Norman Reedus, Julian Richings, Doug Jones, Alexander Goodwin, Alix Koromzay, James Costa, Javon Barnwell	
A U G U S T	22	Money Talks	New Line Cinema	Brett Ratner (director); Joel Cohen, Alec Sokolow (screenplay); Chris Tucker, Charlie Sheen, Heather Locklear, Paul Sorvino, Gerard Ismael, Elise Neal, Michael Wright, Larry Hankin, Paul Gleason, Daniel Roebuck, Frank Bruynbroek, Veronica Cartwright, Damian Chapa, Faizon Love, David Warner, Buddy Joe Hooker, Rance Howard	
A U G U S T	22	A Smile Like Yours	Paramount Pictures / Rysher Entertainment	Keith Samples (director/screenplay); Kevin Meyer (screenplay); Greg Kinnear, Lauren Holly, Joan Cusack, Jay Thomas, Jill Hennessy, Sheridan Samples, Christopher McDonald, Donald Moffat, France Nuyen, Marianne Muellerleile, Ben Stein, Shirley MacLaine	
A U G U S T	24	Snow White: A Tale of Terror	PolyGram Filmed Entertainment / Interscope Communications	Michael Cohn (director); Tom Szollosi, Deborah Serra (screenplay); Sigourney Weaver, Sam Neill, Monica Keena, Gil Bellows, David Conrad, Miroslav Taborsky, Brian Glover, Andrew Tiernan, Anthony Brophy, Chris Bauer, Frances Cuka, Bryan Pringle, Taryn Davis, Joanna Roth, John Edward Allen, Dale Wyatt	
A U G U S T	27	Hoodlum	Metro-Goldwyn-Mayer	Bill Duke (director); Chris Brancato (screenplay); Laurence Fishburne, Tim Roth, Vanessa Williams, Andy García, Cicely Tyson, Chi McBride, Clarence Williams III, Richard Bradford, William Atherton, Loretta Devine, Queen Latifah, Ed O'Ross, Mike Starr, Beau Starr, Paul Benjamin, Tony Rich, David Darlow, Bill Henderson, Marc Vann, Leonard Roberts, Kevyn Morrow	
A U G U S T	29	Excess Baggage	Columbia Pictures	Marco Brambilla (director); Max D. Adams, Dick Clement, Ian La Frenais (screenplay); Alicia Silverstone, Benicio del Toro, Christopher Walken, Jack Thompson, Harry Connick Jr., Nicholas Turturro, Michael Bowen, Robert Wisden, Leland Orser, Sally Kirkland, Hiro Kanagawa, Jorge Vargas, Callum Keith Rennie, C. Ernst Harth, Fulvio Cecere, David Kaye, April Telek, Matthew Robert Kelly	
A U G U S T	29	Kull the Conqueror	Universal Pictures	John Nicolella (director); Charles Edward Pogue (screenplay); Kevin Sorbo, Tia Carrere, Thomas Ian Griffith, Litefoot, Roy Brocksmith, Harvey Fierstein, Karina Lombard, Edward Tudor-Pole, Douglas Henshall, Joe Shaw, Sven-Ole Thorsen, Terry O'Neill, Pat Roach, John Hallam, Peter Petruna	
A U G U S T	29	She's So Lovely	Miramax Films	Nick Cassavetes (director); John Cassavetes (screenplay); Sean Penn, Robin Wright, John Travolta, James Gandolfini, Harry Dean Stanton, Neill Barry, Debi Mazar, Gena Rowlands, Susan Traylor, John Marshall Jones, Chloe Webb, Paul Johansson, Justina Machado, Tito Larriva, Burt Young, Clayton Landey, David Thornton, Erika Eleniak, Talia Shire, Bobby Cooper, James Soravilla, Kristina Malota, Nicolette Little, Kelsey Mulrooney	
S E P T E M B E R	5	Fire Down Below	Warner Bros. Pictures	Félix Enríquez Alcalá (director); Jeb Stuart, Phillip Morton (screenplay); Steven Seagal, Marg Helgenberger, Harry Dean Stanton, Stephen Lang, Brad Hunt, Levon Helm, Kris Kristofferson, Mark Collie, Alex Harvey, Ed Bruce, Amelia Neighbors, Richard Masur, Randy Travis, Marty Stuart, Travis Tritt, Ernie Lively, James Mathers	
S E P T E M B E R	5	Julian Po	Fine Line Features	Alan Wade (director/screenplay); Christian Slater, Robin Tunney, Michael Parks, Cherry Jones, Frankie Faison, Harve Presnell, Allison Janney, Željko Ivanek, LaTanya Richardson	
S E P T E M B E R	6	First Time Felon	HBO Pictures	Charles S. Dutton (director); Daniel Therriault (screenplay); Omar Epps, Delroy Lindo, Rachel Ticotin, Anthony 'Treach' Criss, Justin Pierce, Lucinda Jenney, Jo D. Jonz, Badja Djola, William Forsythe, Robin Vaughn, Tom Nowicki, Sandra 'Pepa' Denton, Kristen Jones, Ed Grady, Deborah Hobart, Gary Anthony Williams, Johnell Gainey, K. Addison Young, Roger Ranney, Tommy Hollis, Charles S. Dutton, Clifton Powell	
S E P T E M B E R	9	Casper: A Spirited Beginning	20th Century Fox Home Entertainment / Saban Entertainment / The Harvey Entertainment Company / Brookwell McNamara Entertainment / Fox Family Films	Sean McNamara (director); Jymn Magon, Thomas Hart (screenplay); Steve Guttenberg, Lori Loughlin, Rodney Dangerfield, Michael McKean, Brendon Ryan Barrett, Richard Moll, Shannon Chandler, Steven Hartman, Logan Robbins, D'Juan Watts, Sherman Hemsley, Ben Stein, Brian Doyle-Murray, Edie McClurg, Rodger Halston, Casper Van Dien, Michael James McDonald, Jeremy Foley, Jim Ward, Bill Farmer, Jess Harnell, James Earl Jones, Pauly Shore	
S E P T E M B E R	9	Two Girls and a Guy	Fox Searchlight Pictures	James Toback (director/screenplay); Robert Downey Jr., Heather Graham, Natasha Gregson Wagner, Frederique van der Wal, Angel David	
S E P T E M B E R	12	The Disappearance of Garcia Lorca	Triumph Films	Marcos Zurinaga (director/screenplay); Juan Antonio Ramos, Neil Cohen (screenplay); Esai Morales, Edward James Olmos, Andy García, Jeroen Krabbé, Miguel Ferrer, Tony Plana, Giancarlo Giannini, Teresa Jose Berganza, Marcela Walerstein, Denise Blasor, Eusebio Lazaro	
S E P T E M B E R	12	The End of Violence	Metro-Goldwyn-Mayer	Wim Wenders (director/screenplay); Nicholas Klein (screenplay); Bill Pullman, Andie MacDowell, Gabriel Byrne, Traci Lind, Rosalind Chao, K. Todd Freeman, Chris Douridas, Pruitt Taylor Vince, John Diehl, Soledad St. Hilarie, Nicole Ari Parker, Daniel Benzali, Samuel Fuller, Loren Dean, Marshall Bell, Frederic Forrest, Marisol Padilla Sánchez, Michael Massee	
S E P T E M B E R	12	The Game	PolyGram Filmed Entertainment	David Fincher (director); John Brancato, Michael Ferris (screenplay); Michael Douglas, Sean Penn, Deborah Kara Unger, James Rebhorn, Peter Donat, Carroll Baker, Armin Mueller-Stahl, Anna Katarina, Charles Martinet, Elizabeth Dennehy, Daniel Schorr, John Aprea, Harrison Young, Kimberly Russell, Gerry Becker, Tommy Flanagan, John Cassini, Harris Savides, Yuji Okumoto, Mark Boone Junior, Jack Kehoe, Christopher John Fields, Linda Manz, Bob Stephenson, Trish Summerville, Spike Jonze, Michael Massee	
S E P T E M B E R	17	The Myth of Fingerprints	Sony Pictures Classics	Bart Freundlich (director/screenplay); Blythe Danner, James LeGros, Julianne Moore, Roy Scheider, Noah Wyle, Michael Vartan, Hope Davis, Brian Kerwin, Laurel Holloman, Arija Bareikis, Chris Bauer	
S E P T E M B E R	19	The Brave Little Toaster Goes to Mars (Canadian theatrical release)	Hyperion Pictures / The Kushner-Locke Company / Morning Sun Animation Group, Inc.	Robert C. Ramirez (director); Willard Carroll (screenplay); Deanna Oliver, Thurl Ravenscroft, Roger Kabler, Timothy Stack, Eric Lloyd, Andy Milder, Fyvush Finkel, Stephen Tobolowsky, Farrah Fawcett, Wayne Knight, Chris Young, Jessica Tuck, Russi Taylor, Brian Doyle-Murray, Carol Channing, DeForest Kelley, Alan King, Kath Soucie, Jim Cummings, Scott Menville, Paddi Edwards, James Murray, Liz Callaway, Marva Hicks, Sally Stevens, Charlie Adler, Eric Bauza, Jeff Bennett, Jodi Benson, Corey Burton, Dan Castellaneta, Cathy Cavadini, Cam Clarke, Anndi McAfee, Susan Silo, Francesca Marie Smith, Jill Talley, Redmond O'Neal, Marc Allen Lewis, Rick Logan, Susie Stevens-Logan, Ross Mapletoft, Jeff Robertson, Susan Boyd, Carmen Carter, Randy Crenshaw, Linda Harmon, Jon Joyce, Geoff Koch, Maxine Waters, Julia Waters, Terry Wood	
S E P T E M B E R	19	Going All the Way	Gramercy Pictures / PolyGram Filmed Entertainment / Lakeshore Entertainment	Mark Pellington (director); Dan Wakefield (screenplay); Jeremy Davies, Ben Affleck, Amy Locane, Rachel Weisz, Rose McGowan, Jill Clayburgh, Lesley Ann Warren	
S E P T E M B E R	19	L.A. Confidential	Warner Bros. Pictures / Regency Enterprises	Curtis Hanson (director/screenplay); Brian Helgeland (screenplay); Kevin Spacey, Russell Crowe, Guy Pearce, Kim Basinger, Danny DeVito, James Cromwell, David Strathairn, Ron Rifkin, Graham Beckel, Amber Smith, Paul Guilfoyle, Matt McCoy, Paolo Seganti, Simon Baker, Tomas Arana, Michael McCleery, Shawnee Free Jones, Darrell Sandeen, Marisol Padilla Sanchez, Gwenda Deacon, Jim Metzler, Brenda Bakke, Allan Graf, Bob Clendenin, Thomas Rosales Jr., John Mahon, Jack Conley, Gene Wolande, David St. James, William Boyd, Alice Dinnean, Rhonda Fleming, Deborah Kerr, Alan Ladd, Veronica Lake, Marilyn Monroe, Nectar Rose, Jane Russell, Frank Sinatra, Elaine Stewart	
S E P T E M B E R	19	In & Out	Paramount Pictures	Frank Oz (director); Paul Rudnick (screenplay); Kevin Kline, Joan Cusack, Matt Dillon, Debbie Reynolds, Wilford Brimley, Bob Newhart, Tom Selleck, Gregory Jbara, Shalom Harlow, Shawn Hatosy, Zak Orth, Lauren Ambrose, Alexandra Holden, Deborah Rush, Lewis J. Stadlen, J. Smith-Cameron, Kate McGregor-Stewart, Debra Monk, Ernie Sabella, Dan Hedaya, Joseph Maher, William Duell, Kevin Chamberlin, June Squibb, Alice Drummond, Becky Ann Baker, Selma Blair, Adam LeFevre, Bill Camp, Chris McKenna, Clare Kramer, Arden Myrin, Whoopi Goldberg, Glenn Close, Jay Leno, John Cunningham, Gus Rogerson, William Parry, Richard Woods, Wally Dunn, Larry Clarke	
S E P T E M B E R	19	A Thousand Acres	Touchstone Pictures / Beacon Pictures / PolyGram / Propaganda Films	Jocelyn Moorhouse (director); Laura Jones (screenplay); Michelle Pfeiffer, Jessica Lange, Jennifer Jason Leigh, Jason Robards, Keith Carradine, Colin Firth, Kevin Anderson, Pat Hingle, John Carroll Lynch, Anne Pitoniak, Vyto Ruginis, Michelle Williams, Elisabeth Moss, Kenneth Tigar, Ray Baker, Beth Grant, Steve Key, Dan Conway, Stan Cahill	
S E P T E M B E R	19	Wishmaster	LIVE Entertainment	Robert Kurtzman (director); Peter Atkins (screenplay); Tammy Lauren, Andrew Divoff, Robert Englund, Chris Lemmon, Wendy Benson, Tony Crane, Jenny O'Hara, Ricco Ross, Gretchen Palmer, Angus Scrimm, George 'Buck' Flower, Ted Raimi, Kane Hodder, Tony Todd, Reggie Bannister, Joseph Pilato, Verne Troyer, Tom Savini, Robert Kurtzman	
S E P T E M B E R	26	The Assignment	Triumph Films / Sony Pictures Releasing	Christian Duguay (director); Dan Gordon, Sabi H. Shabtai (screenplay); Aidan Quinn, Donald Sutherland, Ben Kingsley, Claudia Ferri, Céline Bonnier, Vlasta Vrána, Liliana Komorowska, Von Flores, Al Waxman, Gregory Hlady, Daniel Pilon, Claude Genest, Manuel Aranguiz, Leni Parker, Ted Whittall, Lucie Laurier, Paul Stewart	
S E P T E M B E R	26	The Edge	20th Century Fox	Lee Tamahori (director); David Mamet (screenplay); Anthony Hopkins, Alec Baldwin, Harold Perrineau, Elle Macpherson, L. Q. Jones, Kathleen Wilhoite, David Lindstedt, Mark Kiely, Eli Gabay, Larry Musser, Gordon Tootoosis, Bart the Bear	
S E P T E M B E R	26	The Ice Storm	Fox Searchlight Pictures	Ang Lee (director); James Schamus (screenplay); Kevin Kline, Joan Allen, Sigourney Weaver, Henry Czerny, Adam Hann-Byrd, Tobey Maguire, Christina Ricci, Elijah Wood, Jamey Sheridan, David Krumholtz, Kate Burton, Katie Holmes, Glenn Fitzgerald, Allison Janney	
S E P T E M B E R	26	The Peacemaker	DreamWorks	Mimi Leder (director); Michael Schiffer (screenplay); George Clooney, Nicole Kidman, Marcel Iures, Aleksandr Baluev, Rene Medvesek, Randall Batinkoff, Holt McCallany, Armin Mueller-Stahl, Goran Višnjić, Michael Boatman, Carlos Gómez, Sebastian Roché, Harsh Nayyar	
S E P T E M B E R	26	Soul Food	20th Century Fox / Fox 2000 Pictures	George Tillman Jr. (director/screenplay); Vanessa Williams, Vivica A. Fox, Nia Long, Michael Beach, Mekhi Phifer, Gina Ravera, Brandon Hammond, Irma P. Hall, John M. Watson Sr., Jeffrey D. Sams, Mel Jackson, K-Ci & Jo-Jo, Babyface, Kevon Edmonds, Melvin Edmonds, Malik Yoba	

== October–December ==
Opening		Title	Production company	Cast and crew	Ref.
O C T O B E R	3	Fast, Cheap & Out of Control	Sony Pictures Classics	Errol Morris (director); Dave Hoover, George Mendonça, Ray Mendez, Rodney Brooks	
O C T O B E R	3	Kiss the Girls	Paramount Pictures	Gary Fleder (director); David Klass (screenplay); Morgan Freeman, Ashley Judd, Cary Elwes, Alex McArthur, Tony Goldwyn, Jay O. Sanders, Bill Nunn, Brian Cox, Richard T. Jones, Roma Maffia, Jeremy Piven, Gina Ravera, William Converse-Roberts, Helen Martin, Tatyana M. Ali, Mena A. Suvari, Heidi Schanz, Billy Blanks, Alan Wilder, Dan Cashman, Patrick T. O'Brien, Larry Cedar, Loanne Bishop, W. Earl Brown, Meta Golding, Tricia Vessey, Robert Peters, Robert Overmyer, Anna Maria Horsford, Tracey Walter	
O C T O B E R	3	The Locusts	Orion Pictures / Renegade Films	John Patrick Kelley (director/screenplay); Kate Capshaw, Jeremy Davies, Vince Vaughn, Paul Rudd, Ashley Judd, Daniel Meyer, Jessica Capshaw, Jess Robertson, Jimmy Pickens, Jerry Haynes, Jason Davis	
O C T O B E R	3	The Matchmaker	Gramercy Pictures / PolyGram Filmed Entertainment / Working Title Films	Mark Joffe (director); Karen Janszen, Louis Nowra, Graham Linehan (screenplay); Janeane Garofalo, David O'Hara, Milo O'Shea, Denis Leary, Jay O. Sanders, Saffron Burrows, Rosaleen Linehan, Robert Mandan	
O C T O B E R	3	U Turn	TriStar Pictures / Phoenix Pictures / Illusion Entertainment Group	Oliver Stone (director/screenplay); John Ridley (screenplay); Sean Penn, Nick Nolte, Jennifer Lopez, Joaquin Phoenix, Powers Boothe, Billy Bob Thornton, Claire Danes, Jon Voight, Abraham Benrubi, Sean Stone, Ilia Volok, Valeri Nikolayev, Brent Briscoe, Bo Hopkins, Julie Hagerty, Sheri Foster, Liv Tyler, Laurie Metcalf	
O C T O B E R	8	Deep Crimson	New Yorker Films	Arturo Ripstein (director); Paz Alicia Garciadiego (screenplay); Regina Orozco, Daniel Giménez Cacho, Sherlyn, Patricia Reyes Spíndola, Julieta Egurrola, Marisa Paredes, Rosa Furman, Verónica Merchant, Giovanni Florido, Fernando Soler Palavicini, Alexandria Vincenzio	
O C T O B E R	8	Gang Related	Orion Pictures	Jim Kouf (director/screenplay); James Belushi, Tupac Shakur, Lela Rochon, Dennis Quaid, James Earl Jones, David Paymer, Wendy Crewson, Gary Cole, Terrence "TC" Carson, Brad Greenquist, Kool Mo Dee, Robert LaSardo, Tommy "Tiny" Lister Jr., Gregory Scott Cummins	
O C T O B E R	10	Boogie Nights	New Line Cinema	Paul Thomas Anderson (director/screenplay); Mark Wahlberg, Julianne Moore, Burt Reynolds, Don Cheadle, John C. Reilly, William H. Macy, Heather Graham, Nicole Ari Parker, Philip Seymour Hoffman, Luis Guzman, Philip Baker Hall, Thomas Jane, Robert Ridgely, Robert Downey Sr., Melora Walters, Alfred Molina, Ricky Jay, Nina Hartley, Joanna Gleason, Stanley DeSantis, Laurel Holloman, Jack Wallace, Jon Brion, Michael Jace, Tom Lenk, Tony Tedeschi, Michael Penn, Veronica Hart, Jack Riley, Mike Gunther, Allan Graf, Anne Fletcher	
O C T O B E R	10	The House of Yes	Miramax Films	Mark Waters (director/screenplay); Parker Posey, Josh Hamilton, Tori Spelling, Freddie Prinze Jr., Geneviève Bujold, Rachael Leigh Cook, David Love	
O C T O B E R	10	Most Wanted	New Line Cinema	David Hogan (director); Keenen Ivory Wayans (screenplay); Keenen Ivory Wayans, Jon Voight, Jill Hennessy, Paul Sorvino, Robert Culp, Wolfgang Bodison, Simon Baker, Eric Roberts, John Diehl, Tito Larriva	
O C T O B E R	10	RocketMan	Walt Disney Pictures / Caravan Pictures / Roger Birnbaum Productions	Stuart Gillard (director); Oren Aviv, Craig Mazin, Greg Erb (screenplay); Harland Williams, Jessica Lundy, William Sadler, Jeffrey DeMunn, James Pickens Jr., Beau Bridges, Shelley Duvall, Peter Onorati, Don Lake, Blake Boyd, Paxton Whitehead, Edie Mirman, Gailard Sartain	
O C T O B E R	10	Seven Years in Tibet	TriStar Pictures / Mandalay Entertainment	Jean-Jacques Annaud (director); Becky Johnston (screenplay); Brad Pitt, David Thewlis, B. D. Wong, Mako, Danny Denzongpa, Victor Wong, Ingeborga Dapkūnaitė, Jamyang Jamtsho Wangchuk, Lhakpa Tsamchoe, Jetsun Pema	
O C T O B E R	10	Washington Square	Hollywood Pictures / Caravan Pictures / Roger Birnbaum Productions	Agnieszka Holland (director); Carol Doyle (screenplay); Jennifer Jason Leigh, Albert Finney, Ben Chaplin, Maggie Smith, Judith Ivey, Arthur Lampus, Jennifer Garner, Robert Stanton, Betsy Brantley, Nancy Daly, Marie Abate, Sara Constance Marshall, Rachel Layne Sacrey, Rachel Osborne, Scott Jaeck, Peter Maloney, Lauren Hulsey, Loretto McNally	
O C T O B E R	15	Telling Lies in America	Banner Entertainment	Guy Ferland (director); Joe Eszterhas (screenplay); Kevin Bacon, Brad Renfro, Maximilian Schell, Calista Flockhart, Paul Dooley, Jonathan Rhys Meyers, Luke Wilson, K.K. Dodds, Rohn Thomas, Tuesday Knight, Damen Fletcher, Jerry Swindall, James Kisicki, J.J. Horna, Ben Saypol, Tony Devon	
O C T O B E R	17	Bean	Gramercy Pictures / Working Title Films	Mel Smith (director); Rowan Atkinson, Richard Curtis, Robin Driscoll (screenplay); Rowan Atkinson, Peter MacNicol, John Mills, Pamela Reed, Harris Yulin, Burt Reynolds, Richard Gant, Larry Drake, Sandra Oh, Danny Goldring, Johnny Galecki, Chris Ellis, Andrew Lawrence, Peter Egan, Peter Capaldi, June Brown, Peter James, Tricia Vessey, Tom McGowan	
O C T O B E R	17	I Know What You Did Last Summer	Columbia Pictures / Mandalay Entertainment	Jim Gillespie (director); Kevin Williamson (screenplay); Jennifer Love Hewitt, Sarah Michelle Gellar, Ryan Phillippe, Freddie Prinze Jr., Bridgette Wilson, Anne Heche, Muse Watson, Johnny Galecki	
O C T O B E R	17	Best Men	Orion Pictures	Tamra Davis (director); Art Edler Brown, Tracy Fraim (screenplay); Dean Cain, Andy Dick, Sean Patrick Flanery, Mitchell Whitfield, Luke Wilson, Drew Barrymore, Fred Ward, Raymond J. Barry, Brad Dourif, Tracy Fraim, Biff Yeager, Art Edler Brown, K.K. Dodds, Kathryn Joosten, Dee Maaske, Chris M. Allport	
O C T O B E R	17	The Devil's Advocate	Warner Bros. Pictures / Regency Enterprises	Taylor Hackford (director); Jonathan Lemkin, Tony Gilroy (screenplay); Keanu Reeves, Al Pacino, Charlize Theron, Jeffrey Jones, Judith Ivey, Connie Nielsen, Craig T. Nelson, Heather Matarazzo, Tamara Tunie, Ruben Santiago-Hudson, Debra Monk, Vyto Ruginis, Laura Harrington, George Wyner, Christopher Bauer, Leo Burmester, George Gore II, Kim Chan, Caprice Benedetti, Don King, Susan Kellermann, James Saito, Novella Nelson, Vincent Laresca, Monica Keena, Michael Lombard, John Rothman, Paul Benedict, Harsh Nayyar	
O C T O B E R	17	Playing God	Touchstone Pictures / Beacon Pictures	Andy Wilson (director); Mark Haskell Smith (screenplay); David Duchovny, Timothy Hutton, Angelina Jolie, Michael Massee, Peter Stormare, Andrew Tiernan, Gary Dourdan, John Hawkes, Philip Moon, Pavel D. Lynchnikoff, Tracey Walter, Keone Young, Stella Garcia	
O C T O B E R	21	Annabelle's Wish	Ralph Edwards Productions	Roy Wilson (director); Dan Henderson (short story); Jane Baer, John Bettis, Ken Blackwell, John Couch, Gary Edwards, Bruce Faulk, Kathy Grover, Riki Hobin, Jay Johnson, Jaime Barton Klein, George Larrimore, John Lewis, Barbara Dunn-Leonard, Sheryl Scarborough (screenplay); Randy Travis, Jerry Van Dyke, Jim Varney, Rue McClanahan, Cloris Leachman, Aria Noelle Curzon, James Lafferty, Jennifer Darling, Clancy Brown, Stu Rosen, Jerry Houser, Brian Cummings, Mary Kay Bergman, Tress MacNeille, Jay Johnson, Kay E. Kuter, Kath Soucie, Steve Mackall, Beth Nielsen Chapman, Frank Welker, Chris M. Allport, Jonathan Benair, Nanci Griffith, Jonathan Harris, Alison Krauss, Little Richard, Kevin Sharp, Charlie Cronin, Hari Oziol, Laura Lively	
O C T O B E R	23	Men	Ardustry Home Entertainment	Zoe Clarke-Williams (director/screenplay); James Andronica, Karen Black (screenplay); Sean Young, John Heard, Dylan Walsh, Karen Black, Richard Hillman, Beau Starr, Glenn Shadix, Shawnee Smith	
O C T O B E R	24	FairyTale: A True Story	Paramount Pictures / Icon Productions	Charles Sturridge (director); Ernie Contreras (screenplay); Florence Hoath, Elizabeth Earl, Peter O'Toole, Harvey Keitel, Paul McGann, Bill Nighy, Phoebe Nicholls, Anna Chancellor	
O C T O B E R	24	Gattaca	Columbia Pictures / Jersey Films	Andrew Niccol (director/screenplay); Ethan Hawke, Uma Thurman, Jude Law, Alan Arkin, Loren Dean, Ernest Borgnine, Gore Vidal, Xander Berkeley, Jayne Brook, Elias Koteas, Maya Rudolph, Blair Underwood, Tony Shalhoub, Dean Norris, Ken Marino, Gabrielle Reece, Mason Gamble, William Lee Scott	
O C T O B E R	24	A Life Less Ordinary	20th Century Fox	Danny Boyle (director); John Hodge (screenplay); Ewan McGregor, Cameron Diaz, Holly Hunter, Delroy Lindo, Ian Holm, Dan Hedaya, Stanley Tucci, Maury Chaykin, Tony Shalhoub, K. K. Dodds, Ian McNeice, Christopher Gorham, Timothy Olyphant	
O C T O B E R	28	A Christmas Carol	20th Century Fox Home Entertainment / DIC Productions, L.P.	Stan Phillips (director); Jymn Magon (screenplay); Tim Curry, Whoopi Goldberg, Michael York, Ed Asner, Frank Welker, Kath Soucie, Jodi Benson, Jarrad Kritzstein, Amick Byram, Ian Whitcomb, Joe Lala, Bettina Bush, Jerry Houser, Sidney Miller, Sam Saletta, John Garry, David Wagner, Alan Shearman, Cathy Riso, Kelly Lester, Anna Mathias, Judy Ovitz	
O C T O B E R	31	Critical Care	LIVE Entertainment / Village Roadshow Pictures	Sidney Lumet (director); Steven Schwartz, Richard Dooling (screenplay); James Spader, Kyra Sedgwick, Helen Mirren, Anne Bancroft, Albert Brooks, Jeffrey Wright, Margo Martindale, Wallace Shawn, Philip Bosco, Colm Feore, Edward Herrmann, James Lally, Harvey Atkin, Al Waxman, Hamish McEwan, Jackie Richardson, Barbara Eve Harris, Conrad Coates, Bruno Dressler, Caroline Nielsen	
O C T O B E R	31	Red Corner	Metro-Goldwyn-Mayer	Jon Avnet (director); Robert King (screenplay); Richard Gere, Bai Ling, Bradley Whitford, Byron Mann, Peter Donat, Robert Stanton, Tsai Chin, James Hong, Tzi Ma, Ulrich Matschoss, Richard Venture, Jessey Meng, Roger Yuan, Chi Yu Li, Henry O, Kent Faulcon, Jia Yao Li	
O C T O B E R	31	Switchback	Paramount Pictures / Rysher Entertainment	Jeb Stuart (director/screenplay); Dennis Quaid, Danny Glover, Jared Leto, Ted Levine, William Fichtner, R. Lee Ermey, Walton Goggins, Maggie Roswell, Allison Smith, Julio Oscar Mechoso, Kevin Cooney, Leo Burmester	
N O V E M B E R	7	Eve's Bayou	Trimark Pictures	Kasi Lemmons (director/screenplay); Samuel L. Jackson, Lynn Whitfield, Debbi Morgan, Vondie Curtis-Hall, Branford Marsalis, Lisa Nicole Carson, Meagan Good, Jurnee Smollett, Diahann Carroll, Roger Guenveur Smith, Carol Sutton, Ethel Ayler, Jake Smollett, Leonard L. Thomas, Victoria Rowell	
N O V E M B E R	7	Mad City	Warner Bros. Pictures	Costa-Gavras (director); Tom Matthews (screenplay); Dustin Hoffman, John Travolta, Mia Kirshner, Alan Alda, Robert Prosky, Blythe Danner, William Atherton, Ted Levine, Tammy Lauren, William O'Leary, Raymond J. Barry, Lucinda Jenney, Akosua Busia, Ebbe Roe Smith, Kyla Pratt, John Landis, Randall Batinkoff, Julio Oscar Mechoso, David Clennon, Jay Leno, Richard Portnow, Bill Rafferty, Sean O'Kane, Patricia Smith, Dirk Blocker, Michele Santopietro, Anthony Aibel, Larry King, Bill Nunn	
N O V E M B E R	7	Starship Troopers	TriStar Pictures / Touchstone Pictures	Paul Verhoeven (director); Edward Neumeier (screenplay); Casper Van Dien, Dina Meyer, Denise Richards, Jake Busey, Neil Patrick Harris, Patrick Muldoon, Clancy Brown, Michael Ironside, Seth Gilliam, Bruce Gray, Marshall Bell, Eric Bruskotter, Brenda Strong, Christopher Curry, Lenore Kasdorf, Denise Dowse, Amy Smart, Dean Norris, Rue McClanahan, Dale Dye, Anthony Ruivivar, Robert David Hall, Blake Lindsley, Steven Ford, Greg Travis, Timothy Omundson, Eric DaRe, R. Lee Ermey, Edward Neumeier, Julie Pinson, Parry Shen, Brian Tochi	
N O V E M B E R	7	The Wings of the Dove	Miramax Films	Iain Softley (director); Hossein Amini (screenplay); Helena Bonham Carter, Linus Roache, Alison Elliott, Elizabeth McGovern, Michael Gambon, Alex Jennings, Charlotte Rampling	
N O V E M B E R	11	Beauty and the Beast: The Enchanted Christmas	Walt Disney Home Video	Andy Knight (director); Flip Kobler, Cindy Marcus, Bill Motz, Bob Moth (screenplay); Paige O'Hara, Robby Benson, Jerry Orbach, David Ogden Stiers, Angela Lansbury, Haley Joel Osment, Bernadette Peters, Tim Curry, Paul Reubens, Frank Welker, Jeff Bennett, Jim Cummings, Kath Soucie, Jeff Blumenkrantz, Victoria Clark, Gregg Edelman, Judy Kaye, Rebecca Luker, Howard McGillin, Andrea Robinson, Ted Sperling, Carmen Twillie, Martin Vidnovic, Oren Waters, Andrew Keenan-Bolger, Judith Blazer, Bill Cantos, Kevin Dorsey, Gene Miller, Lauren Mitchell, Bobbi Page, Wilbur Pauley, Sharon Scruggs, Maxine Waters Willard	
N O V E M B E R	14	The Jackal	Universal Pictures / Mutual Film Company / Alphaville Films	Michael Caton-Jones (director); Chuck Pfarrer (screenplay); Bruce Willis, Richard Gere, Sidney Poitier, Diane Venora, Mathilda May, J. K. Simmons, Richard Lineback, John Cunningham, Jack Black, Tess Harper, Leslie Phillips, Stephen Spinella, Sophie Okonedo, David Hayman, Steve Bassett, Yuri Stepanov, Ravil Isyanov, Walt MacPherson, Maggie Castle, Daniel Dae Kim, Michael Caton-Jones, Peter Sullivan, Richard Cubison, Serge Houde, Ewan Bailey, Jonathan Aris, Edward Fine, Larry King, Murphy Guyer	
N O V E M B E R	14	Kiss or Kill	Beyond Films / New Vision Films	Bill Bennett (director/screenplay); Frances O'Connor, Matt Day, Chris Haywood, Andrew S. Gilbert, Max Cullen, Barry Otto, Geoff Revell, Barry Langrishe, Eliza Lovell, Tiffany Peters, Julie Sobotta, Syd Brisbane	
N O V E M B E R	14	The Man Who Knew Too Little	Warner Bros. Pictures / Regency Enterprises	Jon Amiel (director); Robert Farrar, Howard Franklin (screenplay); Bill Murray, Peter Gallagher, Joanne Whalley, Alfred Molina, Richard Wilson, Geraldine James, John Standing, Anna Chancellor, Nicholas Woodeson, Simon Chandler, John Thomson, Cliff Parisi, Dexter Fletcher, Sheila Reid, Eddie Marsan	
N O V E M B E R	14	The Tango Lesson	Sony Pictures Classics	Sally Potter (director/screenplay); Sally Potter, Pablo Veron, Gustavo Naveira, Fabian Salas, Carlos Copello, Carolina Iotti, Zobeida, Orazio Massaro, Morgane Maugran, Geraldine Maillet, Katerina Mechera, David Toole, George Yiasoumi, Michele Parent, Claudine Mavros, Monique Couturier, Matthew Hawkins, Simon Worgan, Maria Noel, Gregory Dayton	
N O V E M B E R	14	One Night Stand	New Line Cinema	Mike Figgis (director/screenplay); Wesley Snipes, Nastassja Kinski, Kyle MacLachlan, Ming-Na Wen, Robert Downey Jr., Glenn Plummer, Amanda Donohoe, Thomas Haden Church, Julian Sands, Xander Berkeley, Marcus T. Paulk, John Calley, Zoe Nathenson, Vincent Ward, John Ratzenberger, Thomas Kopache, Annabelle Gurwitch, Mike Figgis, Edita Brychta, Donovan Leitch, Ione Skye, Chris Bauer, Anne Lambton, Nick Sandow, Bill Raymond, Saffron Burrows, Sabrina Van Tassel, Cleveland Mitchell, Lisa Ann Cabasa, Karis Jagger, Michele Merkin, Tava Smiley	
N O V E M B E R	15	Don King: Only in America	HBO Pictures	John Herzfeld (director); Kario Salem (screenplay); Ving Rhames, Vondie Curtis-Hall, Jeremy Piven, Darius McCrary, Keith David, Gabriel Casseus, Loretta Devine, Brent Jennings, Bernie Mac, Donzaleigh Abernathy, Lou Rawls, Teddy Atlas, Jarrod Bunch, Ron Leibman, Ken Lerner, Simon Templeman, Brad Garrett, David Kirkwood, Robby Robinson, James R. Black, Michael Bowen, Israel Cole, Clifford Couser, Kevin Grevioux, Carlos Monroe, Cara DeLizia, Amanda Fuller, Jennifer Crystal Foley, Danny Johnson, K.J. Penthouse, Michael Blanks, Everton Davis	
N O V E M B E R	21	Anastasia	20th Century Fox	Don Bluth, Gary Goldman (directors); Susan Gauthier, Bruce Graham, Bob Tzudiker, Noni White, Eric Tuchman (screenplay); Meg Ryan, John Cusack, Kelsey Grammer, Christopher Lloyd, Hank Azaria, Angela Lansbury, Bernadette Peters, Kirsten Dunst, Lacey Chabert, Andrea Martin, Rick Jones, Debra Mooney, Arthur Malet, J.K. Simmons, Victoria Clark, Billy Porter, Lillias White, Liz Callaway, Jonathan Dokuchitz, Jim Cummings, Glenn Walker Harris Jr., Charity James	
N O V E M B E R	21	Midnight in the Garden of Good and Evil	Warner Bros. Pictures	Clint Eastwood (director); John Lee Hancock (screenplay); Kevin Spacey, John Cusack, Jack Thompson, Irma P. Hall, Jude Law, Alison Eastwood, Paul Hipp, The Lady Chablis, Dorothy Loudon, Anne Haney, Kim Hunter, Geoffrey Lewis, Richard Herd, Leon Rippy, Bob Gunton, Gary Anthony Williams, Sonny Seiler, Terry Rhoads, Patrika Darbo, James Moody, Michael Rosenbaum, Ann Cusack, James Gandolfini	
N O V E M B E R	21	Mortal Kombat Annihilation	New Line Cinema	John R. Leonetti (director); Brent V. Friedman, Bryce Zabel (screenplay); Robin Shou, Talisa Soto, Brian Thompson, Sandra Hess, Lynn "Red" Williams, Irina Pantaeva, James Remar, Musetta Vander, Marjean Holden, Reiner Schöne, Litefoot, Deron McBee, J. J. Perry, Chris Conrad, Keith Cooke, Dana Hee, Lance LeGault, Carolyn Seymour, Ray Park, Ed Boon, Steven Ho, Cary-Hiroyuki Tagawa, John Medlen, Tyrone Wiggins, Dennis Keiffier, Ridley Tsui	
N O V E M B E R	21	The Rainmaker	Paramount Pictures / Constellation Films / American Zoetrope	Francis Ford Coppola (director/screenplay); Matt Damon, Claire Danes, Jon Voight, Mary Kay Place, Mickey Rourke, Danny DeVito, Danny Glover, Virginia Madsen, Dean Stockwell, Roy Scheider, Teresa Wright, Randy Travis, Red West, Johnny Whitworth, Andrew Shue	
N O V E M B E R	21	The Sweet Hereafter	Fine Line Features	Atom Egoyan (director/screenplay); Ian Holm, Maury Chaykin, Peter Donaldson, Bruce Greenwood, David Hemblen, Brooke Johnson, Arsinee Khanjian, Tom McCamus, Stephanie Morgenstern, Earl Pastko, Sarah Polley, Gabrielle Rose, Alberta Watson, Caerthan Banks, Allegra Denton, Sarah Rosen Fruitman, Marc Donato, Devon Finn, Simon R. Baker, Russell Banks	
N O V E M B E R	26	Alien Resurrection	20th Century Fox	Jean-Pierre Jeunet (director); Joss Whedon (screenplay); Sigourney Weaver, Winona Ryder, Ron Perlman, Dominique Pinon, Gary Dourdan, Michael Wincott, Brad Dourif, Leland Orser, Dan Hedaya, J. E. Freeman, Kim Flowers, Raymond Cruz, David St. James, Tom Woodruff Jr., Joan La Barbara, Archie Hahn, Steven Gilborn	
N O V E M B E R	26	Bent	Goldwyn Entertainment Company / Channel Four Films	Sean Mathias (director); Martin Sherman (screenplay); Clive Owen, Lothaire Bluteau, Brian Webber, Ian McKellen, Mick Jagger, Nikolaj Coster-Waldau, Jude Law, Paul Bettany, Rachel Weisz	
N O V E M B E R	26	Flubber	Walt Disney Pictures / Great Oaks Entertainment	Les Mayfield (director); John Hughes (screenplay); Robin Williams, Marcia Gay Harden, Christopher McDonald, Raymond J. Barry, Jodi Benson, Clancy Brown, Ted Levine, Wil Wheaton, Edie McClurg, Leslie Stefanson, Sam Lloyd, Scott Michael Campbell, Bob Sarlatte, Dakin Matthews, Julie Morrison, Scott Martin Gershin	
N O V E M B E R	26	Welcome to Sarajevo	Miramax Films	Michael Winterbottom (director); Frank Cottrell Boyce (screenplay); Stephen Dillane, Woody Harrelson, Marisa Tomei, Emira Nusevic, Kerry Fox, Goran Višnjić, James Nesbitt, Emily Lloyd, Igor Dzambazov, Gordana Gadzic, Juliet Aubrey, Drazen Sivak, Vesna Orel, Davor Janjic, Vladimir Jokanovic, Senad Bašić	
D E C E M B E R	5	Good Will Hunting	Miramax Films	Gus Van Sant (director); Ben Affleck, Matt Damon (screenplay); Matt Damon, Ben Affleck, Robin Williams, Minnie Driver, Stellan Skarsgård, Casey Affleck, Cole Hauser, John Mighton, Scott William Winters, Jimmy Flynn, Christopher Britton, Alison Folland, George Plimpton	
D E C E M B E R	10	Amistad	DreamWorks	Steven Spielberg (director); David Franzoni (screenplay); Morgan Freeman, Anthony Hopkins, Djimon Hounsou, Matthew McConaughey, Nigel Hawthorne, David Paymer, Pete Postlethwaite, Stellan Skarsgård, Anna Paquin, Tomas Milian, Chiwetel Ejiofor, Derrick Ashong, Geno Silva, John Ortiz, Kevin J. O'Connor, Ralph Brown, Darren E. Burrows, Allan Rich, Paul Guilfoyle, Peter Firth, Xander Berkeley, Jeremy Northam, Arliss Howard, Austin Pendleton, Pedro Armendariz Jr., Razaaq Adoti, Abu Bakaar Fofanah, Harry Blackmun	
D E C E M B E R	12	Deconstructing Harry	Fine Line Features	Woody Allen (director/screenplay); Caroline Aaron, Woody Allen, Kirstie Alley, Bob Balaban, Richard Benjamin, Eric Bogosian, Billy Crystal, Judy Davis, Hazelle Goodman, Mariel Hemingway, Amy Irving, Julie Kavner, Eric Lloyd, Julia Louis-Dreyfus, Tobey Maguire, Demi Moore, Elisabeth Shue, Stanley Tucci, Robin Williams, Jennifer Garner, Paul Giamatti, Amy Irving, Viola Harris, Shifra Lerer	
D E C E M B E R	12	For Richer or Poorer	Universal Pictures / The Bubble Factory	Bryan Spicer (director); Jana Howington, Steve LuKanic (screenplay); Tim Allen, Kirstie Alley, Jay O. Sanders, Michael Lerner, Wayne Knight, Larry Miller, Miguel A. Nunez Jr., Megan Cavanagh, John Pyper-Ferguson, Carrie Preston, Ethan Phillips, Bobby Steggert, Michael Angarano, Marla Maples, Anthony Azizi, Kathleen More	
D E C E M B E R	12	Home Alone 3	20th Century Fox / Hughes Entertainment	Raja Gosnell (director); John Hughes (screenplay); Alex D. Linz, Olek Krupa, Rya Kihlstedt, Lenny Von Dohlen, David Thornton, Haviland Morris, Marian Seldes, Kevin Kilner, Seth Smith, Scarlett Johansson, Christopher Curry, Baxter Harris, Neil Flynn	
D E C E M B E R	12	Scream 2	Dimension Films	Wes Craven (director); Kevin Williamson (screenplay); David Arquette, Neve Campbell, Courteney Cox, Sarah Michelle Gellar, Jamie Kennedy, Jerry O'Connell, Jada Pinkett, Liev Schreiber, Elise Neal, Timothy Olyphant, Laurie Metcalf, Duane Martin, Omar Epps, David Warner, Rebecca Gayheart, Portia de Rossi, Lewis Arquette, Roger L. Jackson, Tori Spelling, Luke Wilson, Heather Graham, Joshua Jackson, Craig Shoemaker, Marisol Nichols, Philip Pavel, Christopher Doyle, Rebecca McFarland, Adam Shankman, Anne Fletcher, Nancy O'Dell, Kevin Williamson, Peter Deming, Selma Blair, Wes Craven, Matthew Lillard	
D E C E M B E R	13	Breast Men	HBO Pictures	Lawrence O'Neil (director); John Stockwell (screenplay); David Schwimmer, Chris Cooper, Emily Procter, Matt Frewer, Terry O'Quinn, Kathleen Wilhoite, John Stockwell, Lisa Marie, Louise Fletcher, Michael Cavanaugh, Michael Chieffo, Patrick Cronin, Amanda Foreman, Lyle Lovett, Julie McCullough, Rena Riffel, Raphael Sbarge, Alan Blumenfeld, Dennis Bowen, Sharon Case, Kip King, Joleen Lutz, Jennifer Lyons, Barbara Niven, Frank Novak, Eve Plumb, Mark Valley, Leigh-Allyn Baker, Lauren Bowles, Terri Ivens, Xander Berkeley, Beth Broderick, Ashley Gardner, Terri Hanauer, Judith Hoag, Kaitlin Hopkins, Leila Kenzle, Kari Lizer, Gail Matthius, Deirdre O'Connell, Pamela Adlon, Heidi Swedberg, Karen Austin, Corey Parker, Nina Siemaszko, Fred Willard	
D E C E M B E R	17	The Apostle	October Films	Robert Duvall (director/screenplay); Robert Duvall, Farrah Fawcett, John Beasley, Billy Bob Thornton, June Carter Cash, Miranda Richardson, Walton Goggins, Billy Joe Shaver, Rick Dial, Todd Allen	
D E C E M B E R	19	Mouse Hunt	DreamWorks	Gore Verbinski (director); Adam Rifkin (screenplay); Nathan Lane, Lee Evans, Maury Chaykin, Christopher Walken, Vicki Lewis, Eric Christmas, Michael Jeter, Debra Christofferson, Camilla Søeberg, Ian Abercrombie, Annabelle Gurwitch, Eric Poppick, Ernie Sabella, William Hickey, Cliff Emmich	
D E C E M B E R	19	Titanic	Paramount Pictures	James Cameron (director/screenplay); Leonardo DiCaprio, Kate Winslet, Billy Zane, Kathy Bates, Frances Fisher, Bernard Hill, Jonathan Hyde, Danny Nucci, Gloria Stuart, David Warner, Victor Garber, Bill Paxton, Eric Braeden, Ioan Gruffudd, Bernard Fox, Suzy Amis, Jason Barry, Michael Ensign, Jonathan Evans-Jones, Mark Lindsay Chapman, Ewan Stewart, Jonathan Phillips, Simon Crane, Edward Fletcher, James Lancaster, Lew Palter, Elsa Raven, Martin Jarvis, Rosalind Ayres, Rochelle Rose, Scott G. Anderson, Paul Brightwell, Martin East, Gregory Cooke, Craig Kelly, Liam Tuohy, Terry Forrestal, Lewis Abernathy, Nicholas Cascone, Anatoly Sagalevich, Anders Falk, Edward Kamuda, Karen Kamuda	
D E C E M B E R	19	Tomorrow Never Dies	United Artists	Roger Spottiswoode (director); Bruce Feirstein (screenplay); Pierce Brosnan, Jonathan Pryce, Michelle Yeoh, Teri Hatcher, Joe Don Baker, Judi Dench, Ricky Jay, Gotz Otto, Desmond Llewelyn, Vincent Schiavelli, Colin Salmon, Samantha Bond, Nina Young, Daphne Deckers, Julian Fellowes, Cecilie Thomsen, Gerard Butler, Julian Rhind-Tutt, Hugh Bonneville, Geoffrey Palmer, Terence Rigby, Colin Stinton, Al Matthews, Mark Spalding, Bruce Alexander, Anthony Green, Christopher Bowen, Michael Byrne, Pip Torrens, Jason Watkins, Eoin McCarthy, Brendan Coyle, Rolf Saxon, Philip Kwok, Nichola McAuliffe, Khan Bonfils, Jeff Harding, Michael G. Wilson	
D E C E M B E R	25	An American Werewolf in Paris	Hollywood Pictures	Anthony Waller (director/screenplay); Tim Burns, Tom Stern (screenplay); Tom Everett Scott, Julie Delpy, Vince Vieluf, Phil Buckman, Julie Bowen, Thierry Lhermitte, Pierre Cosso, Tom Novembre, Anthony Waller, Isabelle Constantini	
D E C E M B E R	25	As Good as It Gets	TriStar Pictures	James L. Brooks (director/screenplay); Mark Andrus (screenplay); Jack Nicholson, Helen Hunt, Greg Kinnear, Cuba Gooding Jr., Skeet Ulrich, Shirley Knight, Maya Rudolph, Jesse James, Yeardley Smith, Lupe Ontiveros, Harold Ramis, Lawrence Kasdan, Julie Benz, Tom McGowan, Brian Doyle-Murray, Jamie Kennedy, Missi Pyle, Wood Harris, Bibi Osterwald, Kristi Zea, Patricia Childress, Rebekah Johnson, Leslie Stefanson, Tara Subkoff, Shane Black, Peter Jacobson, Lisa Edelstein, Randall Batinkoff, Justin Herwick, Kathryn Morris, Kaitlin Hopkins, Jimmy Workman, Danielle Spencer, Todd Solondz, Danielle Brisebois, Matt Malloy, Paul Greenberg, Amy Anzel, Maurice LaMarche	
D E C E M B E R	25	The Education of Little Tree	Paramount Pictures	Richard Friedenberg (director/screenplay); Earl Hamner Jr., Don Sipes (screenplay); James Cromwell, Tantoo Cardinal, Joseph Ashton, Graham Greene, Mika Boorem, Christopher Heyerdahl, Chris Fennell, Leni Parker, Rebecca Dewey, Bill Rowat, Robert Daviau, Norris Domingue	
D E C E M B E R	25	Jackie Brown	Miramax Films / A Band Apart	Quentin Tarantino (director/screenplay); Pam Grier, Samuel L. Jackson, Robert Forster, Bridget Fonda, Michael Keaton, Robert De Niro, Michael Bowen, Chris Tucker, LisaGay Hamilton, Tommy "Tiny" Lister Jr., Hattie Winston, Sid Haig, Aimee Graham, Diana Uribe, Gillian Iliana Waters, Quentin Tarantino, Ellis E. Williams, Tangie Ambrose, T'Keyah Crystal Keymáh, Denise Crosby, Tony Curtis	
D E C E M B E R	25	Kundun	Touchstone Pictures	Martin Scorsese (director); Melissa Mathison (screenplay); Tenzin Thuthob Tsarong, Gyurme Tethong, Tulku Jamyang Kunga Tenzin, Tenzin Yeshi Paichang, Tencho Gyalpo, Tsewang Migyur Khangsar, Tenzin Lodoe, Tsering Lhamo, Geshi Yeshi Gyatso, Lobsang Gyatso, Sonam Phuntsok, Gyatso Lukhang, Lobsang Samten, Tsewang Jigme Tsarong, Tenzin Trinley, Robert Lin, Jurme Wangda	
D E C E M B E R	25	Mr. Magoo	Walt Disney Pictures	Stanley Tong (director); Pat Proft, Tom Sherohman (screenplay); Leslie Nielsen, Kelly Lynch, Malcolm McDowell, Miguel Ferrer, Matt Keeslar, Nick Chinlund, Stephen Tobolowsky, Ernie Hudson, Jennifer Garner, Frank Welker, Terence Kelly, Jerry Wasserman, Bill Dow, Frank C. Turner, Greg Burson	
D E C E M B E R	25	The Postman	Warner Bros. Pictures / Tig Productions	Kevin Costner (director); Eric Roth, Brian Helgeland (screenplay); Kevin Costner, Will Patton, Larenz Tate, Olivia Williams, James Russo, Tom Petty, Daniel von Bargen, Scott Bairstow, Giovanni Ribisi, Roberta Maxwell, Joe Santos, Ron McLarty, Brian Anthony Wilson, Peggy Lipton, Rex Linn, Shawn Hatosy, Ryan Hurst, Charles Esten, Ty O'Neal, Tom Bower	
D E C E M B E R	25	Wag the Dog	New Line Cinema	Barry Levinson (director); Hilary Henkin, David Mamet (screenplay); Dustin Hoffman, Robert De Niro, Anne Heche, Denis Leary, William H. Macy, Willie Nelson, Andrea Martin, Kirsten Dunst, Craig T. Nelson, John Michael Higgins, Suzie Plakson, Woody Harrelson, Suzanne Cryer, David Koechner, Jay Leno, James Belushi, Michael Belson	
D E C E M B E R	26	Afterglow	Sony Pictures Classics	Alan Rudolph (director/screenplay); Nick Nolte, Julie Christie, Lara Flynn Boyle, Jonny Lee Miller, Jay Underwood, Domini Blythe, Alan Fawcett, Michele Barbara-Pelletier, France Castel, Genevieve Bissonette, Yves Corbeil, Claudia Besso, Ellen David	
D E C E M B E R	29	Young and Dangerous 4	Television Corporation of Singapore	Andrew Lau (director); Ekin Cheng, Jordan Chan	
D E C E M B E R	31	The Boxer	Universal Pictures	Jim Sheridan (director/screenplay); Terry George (screenplay); Daniel Day-Lewis, Emily Watson, Brian Cox, Ken Stott, Gerard McSorley, Kenneth Cranham, Ian McElhinney, Ciaran Fitzgerald	
D E C E M B E R	31	Oscar and Lucinda	Fox Searchlight Pictures	Gillian Armstrong (director); Laura Jones (screenplay); Ralph Fiennes, Cate Blanchett, Ciarán Hinds, Tom Wilkinson, Richard Roxburgh, Clive Russell, Bille Brown, Josephine Byrnes, Barnaby Kay, Barry Otto, Linda Bassett, Peter Whitford, Geoffrey Rush, Adam Hayes, James Tingey, Polly Cheshire	

== See also ==
- List of 1997 box office number-one films in the United States
- 1997 in the United States
