= Ryan Allen =

Ryan Allen may refer to:

- Ryan Allen (bass) (1943–2018), American bass singer
- Ryan Allen (American football) (born 1990), American football player
- Ryan Allen Carrillo (born 1975), American television personality
