= Telling Lies in America =

- Theatrical release poster
- Directed by: Guy Ferland
- Written by: Joe Eszterhas
- Produced by: Fran Rubel Kuzui; Ben Myron
- Starring: Kevin Bacon; Brad Renfro; Maximilian Schell; Calista Flockhart; Paul Dooley; Luke Wilson
- Cinematography: Reynaldo Villalobos
- Edited by: Jill Savitt
- Music by: Nicholas Pike
- Production companies: Banner Entertainment; Ben Myron Productions; Kuzui Enterprises; Relevart Inc
- Distributed by: Banner Entertainment
- Release dates: September 10, 1997 (Toronto International Film Festival); October 15, 1997 (United States)
- Running time: 101 minutes
- Country: United States
- Language: English
- Budget: $4 million
- Box office: $318,809

Telling Lies in America is a 1997 period coming-of-age drama film directed by Guy Ferland and written by Joe Eszterhas.

== Plot ==
Karchy Jonas is a 17-year-old high-school student and immigrant from Hungary trying to find his way in the world. He meets radio personality Billy Magic, who takes him under his wing. However, unbeknownst to Karchy, authorities are after Billy for accepting payola from record companies to give their songs air time. Billy gives Karchy a part-time job because he realizes that Karchy cheated and lied to win his (Billy's) radio contest, and thus would be a perfect assistant in the scam. Karchy does not realize that his involvement may jeopardize his and his father's prospective U.S. citizenship. Karchy pursues a co-worker at the local grocery store where he works and eventually does have sex with her, only to find out that she became engaged to their employer, Henry. Karchy idolizes Billy but ultimately realizes how corrupted, bitter, and cynical he actually is. Karchy commits perjury on the stand, but decides not to idealize Billy any longer. Billy gets a new gig at another radio station under user the name “Billy Lightning”.

== Cast ==
- Kevin Bacon as Billy "Magic"
- Brad Renfro as Karchy "Chucky" / "Slick" Jonas
- Maximilian Schell as Dr. Istvan Jonas
- Calista Flockhart as Diney Majeski
- Paul Dooley as Father Norton
- Jonathan Rhys Meyers as Kevin Boyle
- Luke Wilson as Henry
- Damen Fletcher as Amos "Blood Smith"
- Jerry Swindall as Andy "Croak" Stas
- K.K. Dodds as Justine
- James Kisicki as Cecil Simms
- J.J. Horna as The Blind Kid
- Ben Saypol as Timmy Morelli
- Tony Devon as Danny Hogan
- Rohn Thomas as Sergeant Disapri
- Tuesday Knight as WHK Receptionist

== Production ==
Eszterhas wrote the film in 1983 under the title Magic Man but could not sell it. Eventually his wife Naomi read the script and suggested he revisit it. "It was so moving, so good, I couldn't believe it hadn't been made," she said. "I thought it was too good to be sitting on a shelf. I thought the relationship between Karchy (the protagonist) and his father wasn't entirely worked out."

Eszterhas rewrote the script and sold it to Banner Entertainment. The writer gave up his $100,000 fee so Max Schell could play a role.

According to the website Splitsider, actor John Candy was considered for the role of Billy Magic.

The film was shot in 24 days during August 1996 in Cleveland, Ohio.

== Reception ==
Telling Lies in America received mixed to positive reviews from critics. It holds a 67% approval rating on Rotten Tomatoes, based on 18 reviews, with an average rating of 5.93/10. On Metacritic, the film has a weighted average score of 65 out of 100, based on 20 critics, indicating "generally favorable reviews".

=== Box office ===
The film was released in limited release opened at #22 at the North American box office and grossed $11,470. The film would end with a domestic gross of $318,809.

=== Accolades ===
The film won a Special Recognition award for Excellence in Filmmaking at the National Board of Review Awards in 1997.

== Home media ==
The film was released in VHS on November 3, 1998, and DVD on April 25, 2000. The film was released as part of a Blu-ray Disc double feature with Traveller from Shout! Factory on May 29, 2012.
