= Dennis Watkins =

American magician (born 1978)

- Born: September 9, 1978 (age 47); Dallas, Texas
- Education: Southern Methodist University Meadows School of the Arts
- Occupations: Magician, mentalist and actor

Dennis Watkins (born September 9, 1978) is an American magician, mentalist, and actor, based in Chicago, Illinois. Watkins specializes in sleight of hand, walking on broken glass, swallowing razor blades, and a card trick known as the Balloon Trick, where he crawls inside a 7-foot wide balloon. He has performed across the United States, and his public show, The Magic Parlour, played at Chicago's Palmer House Hilton Hotel since New Year's Eve, 2011 until fall 2023, when it relocated to Petterino's on October 5, 2023.

== Early life ==
Dennis Watkins was born in Dallas, TX. He is the second in a family of four brothers. His grandfather, Ed Watkins, was a local magician who worked as the lead demonstrator at a storefront magic shop called Douglas Magicland in Dallas for 30 years. Around age 7, Watkins began studying sleight-of-hand under the instruction of his grandfather, Ed.

In 2001, Watkins graduated from Southern Methodist University's Meadows School of the Arts in Dallas, TX, where he received the Hunt Leadership Scholars Award. He also spent a year training at the British American Drama Academy.

== Career ==
=== The House Theatre of Chicago ===
Dennis Watkins is a Founding Company Member with The House Theatre of Chicago, where he originated the role of Harry Houdini in Death and Harry Houdini, a play written and directed by Artistic Director Nathan Allen. Portraying Houdini in all 7 sold-out runs of the show, Watkins recreated some of Houdini's feats, including escaping the Water Torture Cell. Watkins received a Joseph Jefferson Award for his work on the show in 2012. Death and Harry Houdini returned to The Adrienne Arsht Center in Miami, Florida in the spring of 2017.

=== The Magic Parlour ===
Watkins created The Magic Parlour, an intimate magic and mentalism performance that began at the Palmer House Hilton in Chicago on New Year's Eve 2011. The production ran at the hotel for more than a decade before relocating in 2023 to a custom-built venue beneath Petterino's restaurant in partnership with Goodman Theatre. The new venue includes The Magic Parlour theater and an adjoining after-show performance space called the Encore Room.

In 2023, The Magic Parlour moved from the Palmer House Hilton to a dedicated venue beneath Petterino's restaurant in Chicago's Loop. The move was developed through a partnership between Watkins' Chicago Magic Company, Goodman Theatre, and Petterino's.

== Personal life ==
Watkins lives in Oak Park, Illinois. He is married to Sean Kelly, with whom he has two adopted children.

== Stage ==
As Actor

- 2001 - 2017 Death and Harry Houdini
- 2002 The Terrible Tragedy of Peter Pan
- 2004 Cave With Man
- 2005, 2008 Dave DaVinci Saves the Universe
- 2005 The Great and Terrible Wizard of Oz
- 2006 Hatfield & McCoy
- 2007 The Sparrow
- 2007, 2013 The Magnificents

As Playwright

- 2007, 2013 The Magnificents
- 2011 - 2017 The Magic Parlour

As Magic Designer

- 2002 The Terrible Tragedy of Peter Pan
- 2005 The Great and Terrible Wizard of Oz
- 2007 The Sparrow
- 2007 Hope Springs Infernal
- 2007, 2013 The Magnificents

As Director

- 2004 San Valentino and the Melancholy Kid
- 2005 Curse of the Crying Heart
- 2006 Valentine Victorious
