= Richard Bonehill =

British actor and stuntsman

Richard Bonehill (c. 1948 – 4 February 2015) was a British actor and stuntman with an expertise in swordsmanship.

== Career ==
He played a number of different character extras in The Empire Strikes Back and Return of the Jedi, most notably the alien Nien Nunb, a Stormtrooper, Tie Fighter pilot and more. Other films he worked on included Flash Gordon and Highlander. His television credits included Doctor Who.

Bonehill was also a competitive fencer and fencing coach. He was crowned 2010 Veterans World Sabre Champion at the 14th World Veterans Fencing Championships held in Croatia. Before the final he was presented with a commemorative diploma from the Fédération Internationale d'Escrime, the world governing body of fencing, to mark his 'extraordinary achievement' of representing Great Britain at 10 consecutive World Championships.

== Death ==
Bonehill died on 4 February 2015. He was 67.

== Filmography ==
=== Film ===
Year	Title	Role	Notes	Ref.
1980	The Empire Strikes Back	Stormtrooper / Snowtrooper / Corman Quien (Rebel Soldier)	Uncredited	
1980	Flash Gordon	Extra	Uncredited	
1983	Return of the Jedi	Stormtrooper / Nien Nunb and various	Uncredited	
1984	Top Secret!	Scarecrow		
1986	Highlander	Buck the Hotel Clerk	Uncredited	
1995	Rob Roy	Gutherie's Opponent		
2005	Cold and Dark	Liposuction Surgeon		
2013	Journals of Erwich	Euripides Eoghan	Short, (final film role)	

=== Television ===
Year	Title	Role	Notes	Ref.
1982-1986	Doctor Who	Various	11 episodes	
1984-1986	Robin of Sherwood	Driver/Swordsman	2 episodes	
1985	Galloping Galaxies!	2nd Gladiator		
1986	Call Me Mister	Chauffeur	Episode: The Creative Accountant	
1988	'Allo' Allo	German guard	2 episodes	
1988	The Bill	1st Resident	Episode: The Silent Gun	
1998	Frenchman's Creek	Guillaume	TV movie	
2000	Jason and the Argonauts	Aertes 2nd General	TV mini-series	
