= K. K. Dodds =

American actress

- Born: 1965 (age 60–61); U.S.
- Spouse: Silas Weir Mitchell (div. 2017)

K. K. Dodds (born 1965) is an American actress best known for playing Susan Hollander on the Fox drama Prison Break and for her roles in the films Soldier and A Life Less Ordinary.

== Career ==
She appeared in such television shows as Prison Break, CSI, and NYPD Blue. Dodds also appeared in the film Soldier as Lieutenant Sloan, in Being John Malkovich as Wendy, in A Life Less Ordinary as Lily, in Grosse Pointe Blank as Tracy, and in Spider-Man as Simkins. She has also taken stage roles, including the lead character Frankie K in Chicago's Amerikafka. She also appeared in the 1999 film The Deep End of the Ocean as Pat Cappadora's sister, Teresa "Tree" Cappadora, alongside Michelle Pfeiffer, Treat Williams (who played Pat), Whoopi Goldberg and Jonathan Jackson.

== Filmography ==
Year	Film	Role	Notes
1990	Flatliners	Jill	
1996	NYPD Blue	Maria Blair	Episode: "These Old Bones"
1996	Sisters	Dr. Tracy Mendelson	Episode: "Dreamcatcher"
1997	Grosse Pointe Blank	Tracy	
1997	Telling Lies in America	Justine	
1997	Best Men	Cindy Vargas	
1997	A Life Less Ordinary	Lily	
1997	Nash Bridges	Astrid Dwyer	Episode: "Most Wanted"
1998	Soldier	Lieutenant Sloan	
1999	The Deep End of the Ocean	Aunt Theresa	
1999	Being John Malkovich	Wendy	
2000	Judging Amy	Mrs. Shepard	Episode: "Shaken, Not Stirred"
2000	High Fidelity	Miranda	
2000	Chicago Hope	Deborah O'Connor	Episode: "Miller Time"
2000	Lost Souls	Deputy	
2000	CSI: Crime Scene Investigation	Amy Hendler	Episode: "Who Are You?"
2000	The Brightness You Keep	Amelia	Short film
2002	Spider-Man	Simkins	
2002	The Shield	Kim Kelner	Episodes: "Cupid & Psycho" and "Throwaway"
2002	Strong Medicine	Jeri Greer	Episode: "House Calls"
2006–2007	Prison Break	Susan Hollander	Recurring role; 5 episodes
2008	Moral Orel	Kim Latchkey / Dottie	3 episodes
2009	Love Hurts	Pamela	
2010–2012	Mary Shelley's Frankenhole	Numerous voices	7 episodes
