= Rohn Thomas =

American actor

- Occupation: actor
- Spouse: Terri Kent

Rohn Thomas is an American actor, based mainly in the Cleveland/Pittsburgh areas who has appeared in supporting roles in such notable movies as The Shawshank Redemption and The Mothman Prophecies. Thomas is a working man's character actor who, while not achieving the notoriety of some of his more famous co-stars, has become widely known for his consistent and strong performances.

Other films Thomas has appeared in include Welcome to Collinwood, Proximity, Turn of Faith, The Dream Catcher, Sudden Death, Roommates, Double Dragon, The Dark Half, Innocent Blood, Waterland, Iron Maze, Striking Distance and The Ides of March.

In addition to film, Thomas has been an Equity Actor for over twenty-five years and has worked at such regional theaters as the Repertory Theatre of St. Louis, the Studio Arena in Buffalo, The Cleveland Play House, and the Great Lakes Theatre Festival. His work also includes industrial film (corporate training videos), voice-overs and commercials. He has appeared on the hit television series The West Wing. Other television credits include the made-for-TV films What She Doesn't Know, Babe Ruth, Guilty Until Proven Innocent, Murder Ordained and the television pilot Equal Justice.

When not working on stage, screen or studio, Thomas teaches his popular workshop, Acting for the Camera, at Kent State University. Thomas feels that actor training in the US today must include instruction in film acting.

Thomas lives in Kent, Ohio and is married to Terri Kent, Artistic Director of Porthouse Theatre. They have four children.

== Filmography ==
Year	Title	Role	Notes
1991	Iron Maze	Doctor	
1992	Waterland	Barman	
1992	Innocent Blood	Coroner	
1993	The Dark Half	Dr. Albertson	
1994	The Shawshank Redemption	Bugle Editor	
1995	Double Dragon	Tour Guide	
1995	Roommates	Kevin	
1995	Sudden Death	Mayor Taylor	
1997	Telling Lies in America	Sgt. Disapri	
1999	The Dream Catcher	Raymond	
2001	Proximity	Marjorie's husband	
2002	The Mothman Prophecies	Dr. Williams	
2002	Welcome to Collinwood	Janitor	
2002	Turn of Faith	Agent Two	
2010	True Nature	Barry	
2011	The Ides of March	Stage Manager	
2013	A Resurrection	Priest	
2016	The Umbrella Man	Allen Atwood	
