= Ryan Allen Carrillo =

American television personality

- Born: March 10, 1975 (age 51); United States
- Occupations: Television personality Trans activist
- Known for: Contestant on Expedition Impossible (2011); On-air role at AfterBuzzTV

Ryan Allen Carrillo (born March 10, 1975) is an American television personality, trans activist, and reality show contestant. Carrillo made his first televised personality appearance as part of Team Fab 3 on ABC's Expedition Impossible in 2011. Although Carrillo had been a professional roller skater traveling on tour with Madonna and appearing in numerous movies as a professional skater. Carrillo is also an on-air personality for AfterBuzzTV. In 2011, Carrillo appeared on Season 4 of Million Dollar Listing Los Angeles when he purchased Mexico y Barra Restaurant in West Hollywood with transgender actress Candis Cayne.

== Artistic roller skating ==
Carrillo is one of a few openly living gay professional athletes in the world. Artistic roller skating is a sport similar to figure skating but where contestants run on roller skates instead of ice skates. Carrillo is a three-time Southwest regional champion, U.S. silver medalist, and member of the in-line World Team. Carrillo won the 1991 USARS Figure Skating National Championship Sophomore Men's Division. The very first Precision Roller Skating World Championships took place October 31, 1999, at the Carrara Stadium in Gold Coast Australia. Carillo represented the United States on team Holiday of Orange, California and finished in 8th place (of 8 competing). Carrillo was featured at the Osmond Family Theatre in Branson, Missouri skating for Tony Orlando and the Osmond Brothers. Carrillo was the featured roller skater in Madonna's "Sorry" music video. Out Magazine labeled him as "Madonna's Skating Boy Toy!"

== Filmography ==
Year	Title	Role !
2002	Austin Powers Gold Member	Skater
2002	Van Wilder	Skater
2006	Madonna LIVE	Tour Skater
2011	Pop Up Video	Skater
2013	Happy Endings	Skater
2014	Watch Mojo	Skater
	Correspondent Host	
2014	Reality Relapse	BiteSize TV online
2014	Big Morning Buzz Live	VH1
2015	Access Hollywood Live	NBC
2015	Good Day LA	Fox LA
2015	The Talk	CBS
2015	Say It To My Face	FYI
2016	Extra	NBC
2016	The Next Food Network Star	food network
2016	David Tutera's CELEBrations	WeTv

== Lawsuit ==
Carrillo and Andrew Gruver filed a lawsuit in Los Angeles Superior Court, naming Lisa Vanderpump, "Real Housewives of Beverly Hills", and her husband as defendants and alleging breach of fiduciary duty, constructive fraud, breach of contract, and misrepresentation and deception, according to court documents. Carillo and Gruver claim the couple "unfairly snatched the West Hollywood venue" where they intended to open a gay sports bar called Bar Varsity.
