= 18th Golden Raspberry Awards =

Award ceremony presented by the Golden Raspberry Award Foundation in 1997

- Date: March 22, 1998
- Site: Hollywood Roosevelt Hotel, Los Angeles, California

Highlights
- Worst Picture: The Postman
- Most awards: The Postman (5)
- Most nominations: Batman & Robin (11)

The 18th Golden Raspberry Awards were held on March 22, 1998, at the Hollywood Roosevelt Hotel to recognize the worst the movie industry had to offer in 1997. This year, the film with the most nominations was Batman & Robin with 11, followed by Speed 2: Cruise Control with eight nominations, Anaconda with six nominations, The Postman with five nominations and Fire Down Below with four nominations. The film winning the most awards was The Postman, with all five categories for which it was nominated.

Brian Helgeland, co-screenwriter of the Razzie-winning The Postman, also received the Academy Award for Best Adapted Screenplay for L.A. Confidential in 1998. Helgeland became the second person, after composer Alan Menken in 1993, to receive a Razzie and Oscar in the same year, a feat not repeated until actress Sandra Bullock in 2010.

== Awards and nominations ==
Winner (in bold)
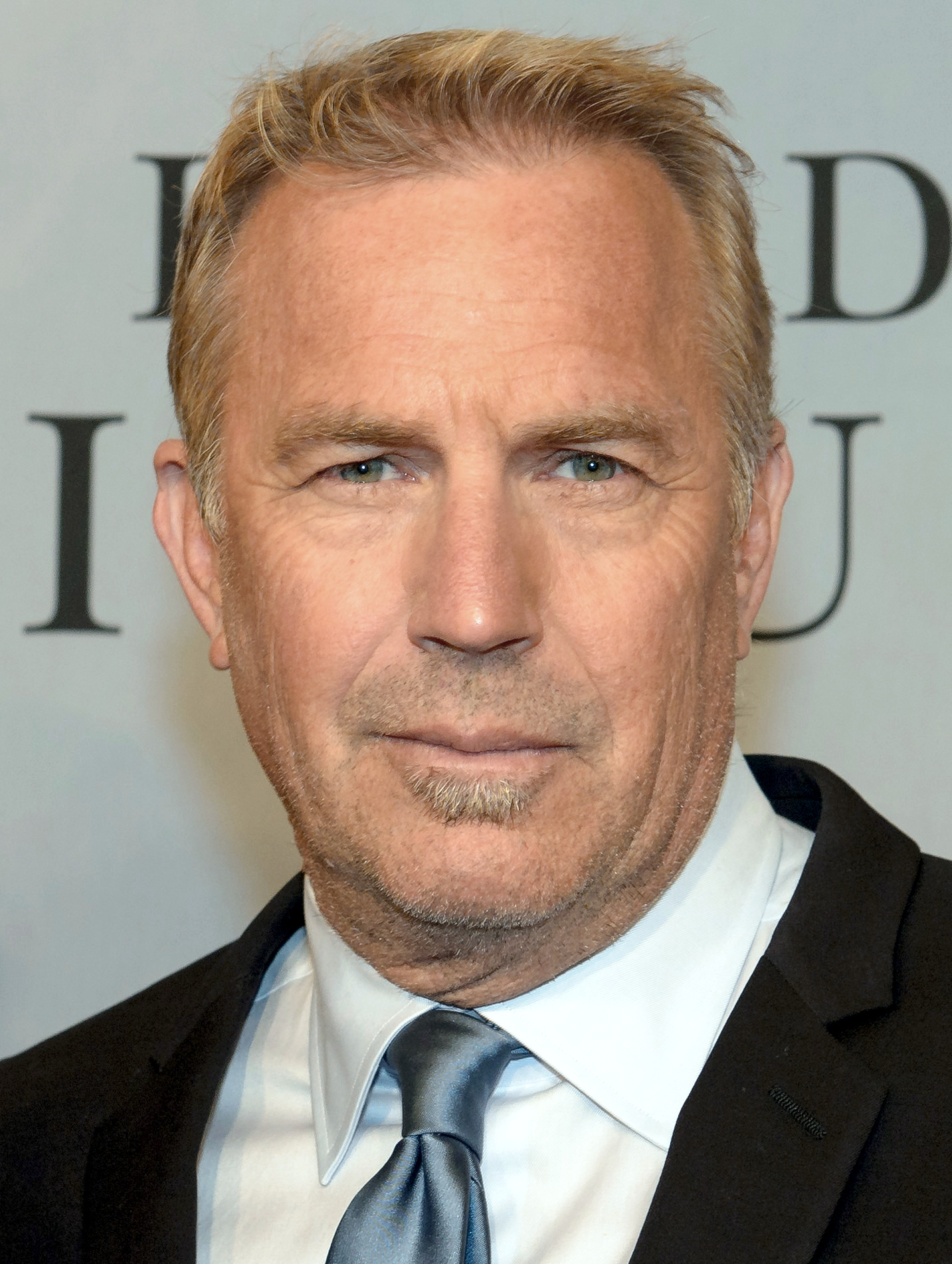
Kevin Costner, Worst Picture, Worst Director and Worst Actor winner.

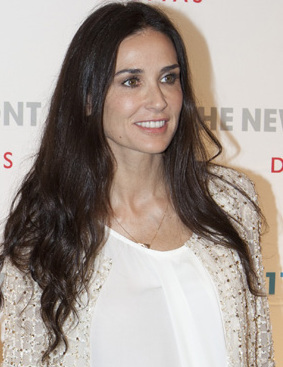
Demi Moore, Worst Actress winner.

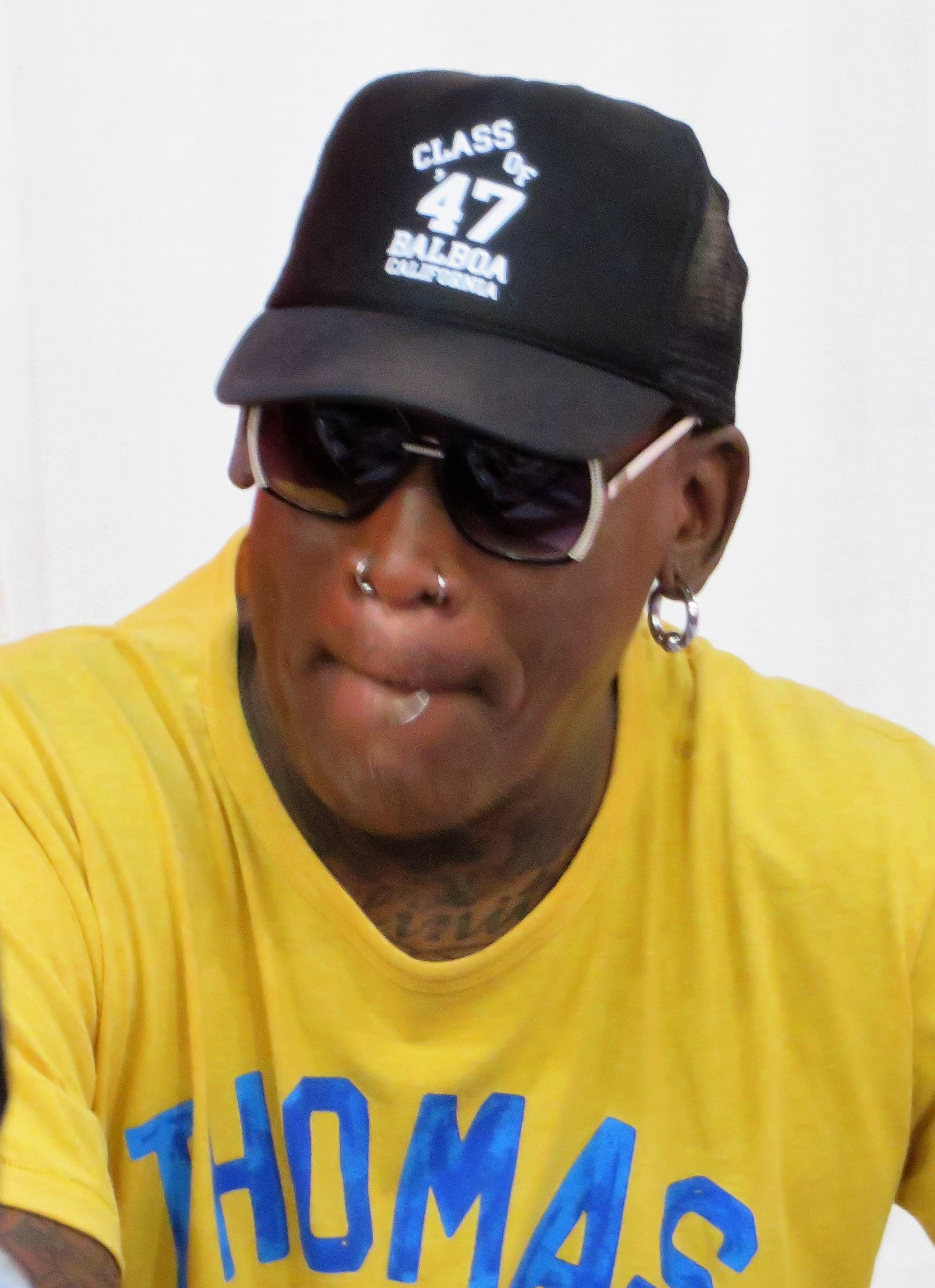
Dennis Rodman, Worst Supporting Actor and Worst New Star winner, Worst Screen Couple co-winner.

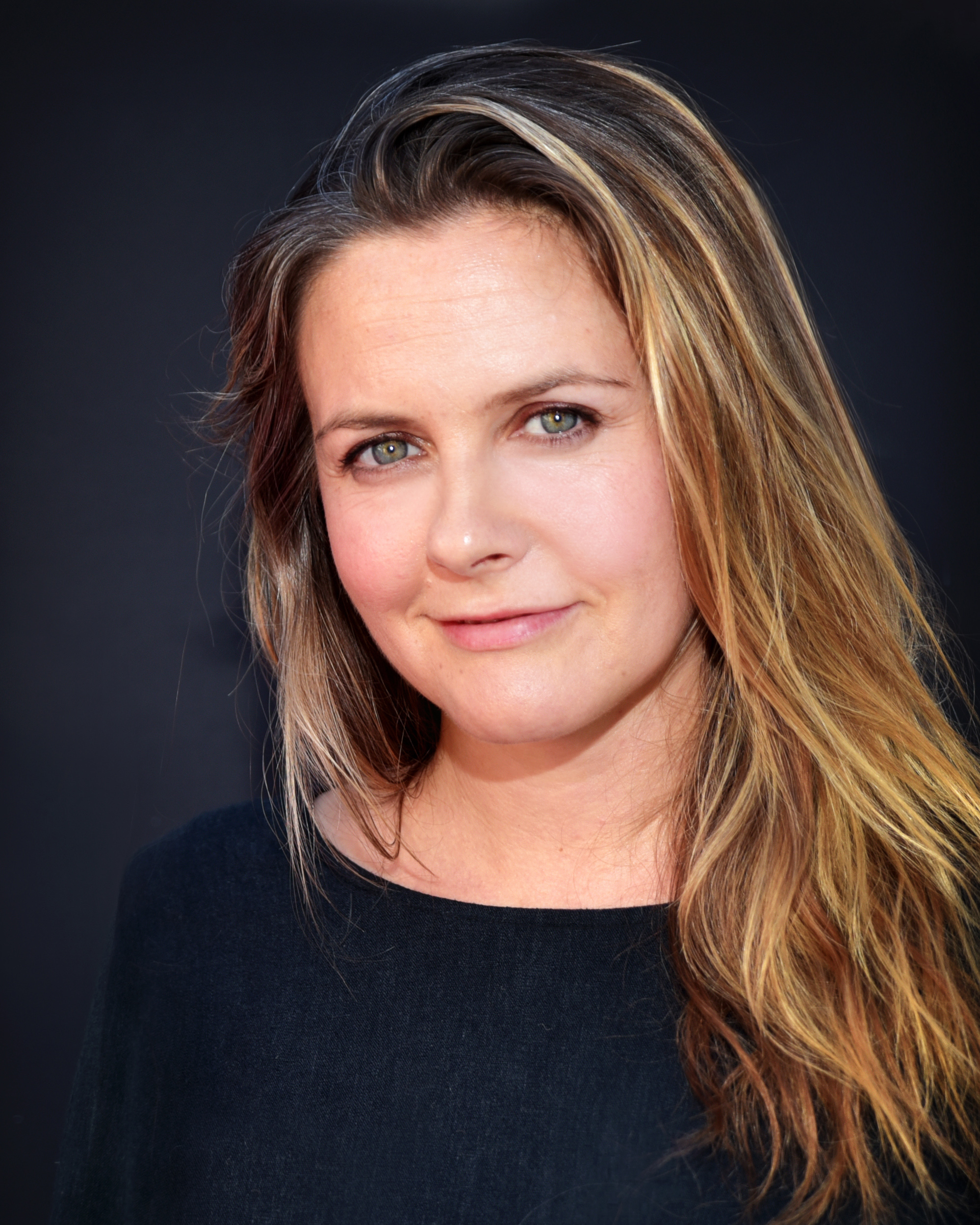
Alicia Silverstone, Worst Supporting Actress winner.

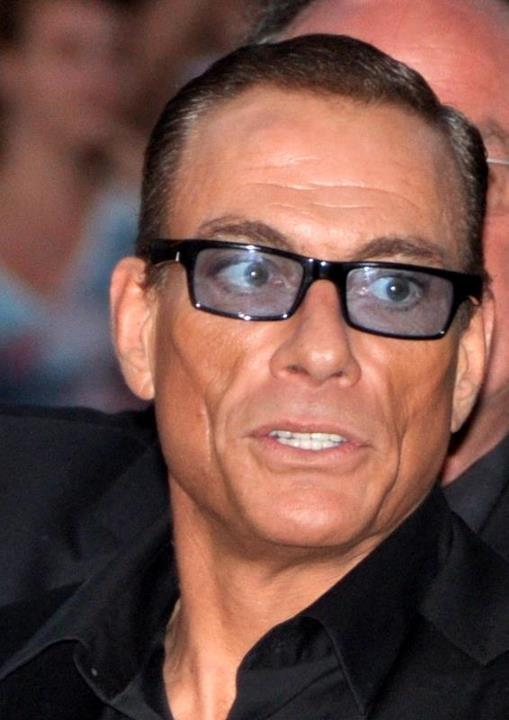
Jean-Claude Van Damme, Worst Screen Couple co-winner.

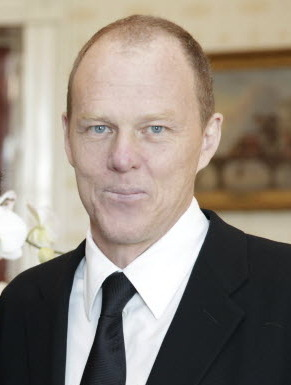
Brian Helgeland, Worst Screenplay co-winner.

Category	Recipient
Worst Picture	**The Postman (Warner Bros.)**
Worst Picture	Anaconda (Columbia)
Worst Picture	Batman & Robin (Warner Bros.)
Worst Picture	Fire Down Below (Warner Bros.)
Worst Picture	Speed 2: Cruise Control (20th Century Fox)
Worst Actor	**Kevin Costner in The Postman as The Postman (Gordon Krantz)**
Worst Actor	Val Kilmer in The Saint as Simon Templar
Worst Actor	Shaquille O'Neal in Steel as John Henry Irons / Steel
Worst Actor	Steven Seagal in Fire Down Below as Jack Taggart
Worst Actor	Jon Voight in Anaconda as Paul Sarone
Worst Actress	**Demi Moore in G.I. Jane as Jordan O'Neil**
Worst Actress	Sandra Bullock in Speed 2: Cruise Control as Annie Porter
Worst Actress	Fran Drescher in The Beautician and the Beast as Joy Miller
Worst Actress	Lauren Holly in A Smile Like Yours and Turbulence as Jennifer Robertson and Teri Halloran (respectively)
Worst Actress	Alicia Silverstone in Excess Baggage as Emily Hope
Worst Supporting Actor	**Dennis Rodman in Double Team as Yaz**
Worst Supporting Actor	Willem Dafoe in Speed 2: Cruise Control as John Geiger
Worst Supporting Actor	Chris O'Donnell in Batman & Robin as Dick Grayson / Robin
Worst Supporting Actor	Arnold Schwarzenegger in Batman & Robin as Victor Fries / Mr. Freeze
Worst Supporting Actor	Jon Voight in Most Wanted and U Turn as Gen. Adam Woodward / Lt. Col. Grant Casey and Blind Man (respectively)
Worst Supporting Actress	**Alicia Silverstone in Batman & Robin as Barbara Wilson / Batgirl**
Worst Supporting Actress	Faye Dunaway in Albino Alligator as Janet Boudreaux
Worst Supporting Actress	Milla Jovovich in The Fifth Element as Leeloo
Worst Supporting Actress	Julia Louis-Dreyfus in Fathers' Day as Carrie Lawrence
Worst Supporting Actress	Uma Thurman in Batman & Robin as Pamela Isley / Poison Ivy
Worst Screen Couple	**Dennis Rodman and Jean-Claude Van Damme in Double Team**
Worst Screen Couple	Sandra Bullock and Jason Patric in Speed 2: Cruise Control
Worst Screen Couple	George Clooney and Chris O'Donnell in Batman & Robin
Worst Screen Couple	Steven Seagal and his guitar in Fire Down Below
Worst Screen Couple	Jon Voight and the animatronic anaconda in Anaconda
Worst Remake or Sequel	**Speed 2: Cruise Control (20th Century Fox)**
Worst Remake or Sequel	Batman & Robin (Warner Bros.)
Worst Remake or Sequel	Home Alone 3 (20th Century Fox)
Worst Remake or Sequel	The Lost World: Jurassic Park (Universal)
Worst Remake or Sequel	McHale's Navy (Universal)
Worst Director	**Kevin Costner for The Postman**
Worst Director	Jan de Bont for Speed 2: Cruise Control
Worst Director	Luis Llosa for Anaconda
Worst Director	Joel Schumacher for Batman & Robin
Worst Director	Oliver Stone for U Turn
Worst Screenplay	**The Postman, screenplay by Eric Roth and Brian Helgeland, based on the novel by David Brin**
Worst Screenplay	Anaconda, written by Hans Bauer, Jim Cash, and Jack Epps Jr.
Worst Screenplay	Batman & Robin, written by Akiva Goldsman
Worst Screenplay	The Lost World: Jurassic Park, screenplay by David Koepp, based on the novel by Michael Crichton
Worst Screenplay	Speed 2: Cruise Control, screenplay by Randall McCormick and Jeff Nathanson, story by Jan de Bont and McCormick
Worst New Star	**Dennis Rodman in Double Team as Yaz**
Worst New Star	The animatronic anaconda in Anaconda
Worst New Star	Tori Spelling in The House of Yes and Scream 2 as Lesly and Herself (respectively)
Worst New Star	Howard Stern in Private Parts as Himself
Worst New Star	Chris Tucker in The Fifth Element and Money Talks as Ruby Rhod and Franklin Hatchett (respectively)
Worst Original Song	**The entire song score from The Postman, words and music by Jeffrey Barr, Glenn Burke, John Coinman, Joe Flood, Blair Forward, Maria Machado, and Jono Manson**
Worst Original Song	"The End Is the Beginning Is the End" from Batman & Robin, written by Billy Corgan
Worst Original Song	"Fire Down Below" from Fire Down Below, music and lyrics by Steven Seagal and Mark Collie
Worst Original Song	"How Do I Live" from Con Air, written by Diane Warren (also Oscar-nominated)
Worst Original Song	"My Dream" from Speed 2: Cruise Control, written by Orville Burrell, Robert Livingston, and Dennis Haliburton
Worst Reckless Disregard for Human Life and Public Property	**Con Air (Touchstone)**
Worst Reckless Disregard for Human Life and Public Property	Batman & Robin (Warner Bros.)
Worst Reckless Disregard for Human Life and Public Property	The Lost World: Jurassic Park (Universal)
Worst Reckless Disregard for Human Life and Public Property	Turbulence (MGM)
Worst Reckless Disregard for Human Life and Public Property	Volcano (20th Century Fox)

== Films with multiple nominations ==
These films received multiple nominations:

Nominations	Films
11	Batman & Robin
8	Speed 2: Cruise Control
6	Anaconda
5	The Postman
4	Fire Down Below
3	Double Team
3	The Lost World: Jurassic Park
2	Con Air
2	The Fifth Element
2	Turbulence
2	U Turn

== See also ==
- 1997 in film
- 70th Academy Awards
- 55th Golden Globe Awards
- 4th Screen Actors Guild Awards
- 51st British Academy Film Awards
