= Fire Down Below (1997 film) =

- Theatrical release poster
- Directed by: Félix Enríquez Alcalá
- Screenplay by: Jeb Stuart; Phillip Morton
- Story by: Jeb Stuart
- Produced by: Julius R. Nasso; Steven Seagal
- Starring: Steven Seagal; Marg Helgenberger; Harry Dean Stanton; Stephen Lang; Kris Kristofferson
- Cinematography: Tom Houghton
- Edited by: Robert A. Ferretti
- Music by: Nick Glennie-Smith
- Production company: Seagal/Nasso Productions
- Distributed by: Warner Bros.
- Release date: September 5, 1997
- Running time: 104 minutes
- Country: United States
- Language: English
- Budget: $60 million (estimated)
- Box office: $24.5 million

Fire Down Below is a 1997 American action film directed by Félix Enríquez Alcalá in his directorial debut. The film stars Steven Seagal (who also co-produced the film) as Jack Taggert, an EPA agent who investigates a Kentucky mine and helps locals stand up for their rights, and also includes cameos by country music performers Randy Travis, Mark Collie, Ed Bruce, Marty Stuart and Travis Tritt as well as country-rocker and the Band member Levon Helm, along with Kris Kristofferson appearing in a supporting role. The film was released in the United States on September 5, 1997, to critical and commercial failure.

== Plot ==
In the peaceful Appalachian hills of eastern Kentucky, toxins are being dumped into abandoned mines, causing environmental havoc, but the locals, mindful of their jobs and the power of the mine owners, can do nothing. EPA CID agent Jack Taggert is sent to investigate, after a fellow agent, revealed to be Jack's friend and partner, Frank Elkins, is found dead, probably not by accident. The EPA has received an anonymous letter from Jackson, Kentucky, and Taggert goes undercover to continue his colleague's investigations. Orin Hanner Sr., president of Hammer Coal Company, is found to be getting paid to dump toxic waste into an abandoned coal mine shaft, so Jack is assigned to go to the small town of Jackson, where his cover is that of assistant and volunteer carpenter to a local church. He stays in a room in the church's basement and begins his cover work by repairing the roof at a house where Walter, one of the children, is sick because of the pollution. He attempts to question the family, but they have little to say. He fares the same elsewhere; even Cotton, the man who tipped off the EPA, is decidedly taciturn. While testing the water, Taggert wanders into a marijuana field and is accosted by the growers. After disarming them, he tells the men that he has no interest in arresting them.

The suspects responsible for Agent Elkins' death soon notice Taggert's presence. As a newcomer to the small community, he is threatened by Hanner's son Orin Jr., the incompetent local tool of the company, corrupt Sheriff Lloyd Foley and several henchmen who are employed by them. The individuals in question start by leaving two rattlesnakes in his dwelling; Taggert responds by capturing the snakes alive and leaving them in the pickup that the goons were driving, causing them to crash. Soon after, five of them attack him while he is buying supplies and receive a severe beating as a result. Orin then requests one of his truck drivers to arrange an "accident" by running him off the road, but Taggert escapes alive while the driver is killed after falling off an open-pit mine cliff.

While these conflicts occur, Taggert strikes up a relationship with Sarah Kellogg, a young woman who lives in the town. She is considered an outcast because of her father's murder, a crime of which she was accused but not convicted. Eventually, she agrees to testify against Orin and his accomplices, much to the dismay of her estranged brother Earl, who committed the murder, after their father found out about his sexual abuse towards her. Working as one of Hanner's cronies, Earl sets the church on fire, in the process killing Reverend Bob Goodall, the preacher who was helping Taggert. He then attempts to collapse the mine with Taggert inside it. Taggert escapes, while several mercenaries are killed, including Earl.

With sufficient evidence and a witness, Taggert calls the FBI to take Sarah into protective custody. However, they are revealed to be corrupt and a firefight ensues at a truck stop. Taggert kills Deputy Marshall Ken Adams, then sends the his colleague back to Orin with a message that he will be coming for him next. However, when Orin is arrested and charged, he gets off with a slap on the wrist for the environmental violations. Taggert goes back into the town and fights the remainder of Orin Jr.'s teammates, then demands the truth from him. Orin Jr. agrees to turn the state's evidence, implicating his father on racketeering, conspiracy, arson, and murder charges. Taggert goes to a casino to arrest Orin. After hearing about the reception awaiting him in federal prison, Orin produces a gun, kills a federal officer and resists, but Taggert shoots him in the shoulder and he is taken into custody. Taggert then returns to Jackson, where he is reunited with Sarah.

== Cast ==
- Steven Seagal as EPA Agent Jack Taggert
- Marg Helgenberger as Sarah Kellogg
- Harry Dean Stanton as Cotton
- Stephen Lang as Earl Kellogg
- Brad Hunt as Orin Hanner Jr.
- Levon Helm as Reverend Bob Goodall
- Kris Kristofferson as Orin Hanner Sr.
- Ed Bruce as Sheriff Lloyd Foley
- Alex Harvey as Sims
- Robert Ridgely as Simon
- Mark Collie as Hatch
- Amelia Neighbors as Edie Carr
- Richard Masur as EPA Administrator Phil Pratt
- Clay Jeter as Walter
- Peggy Lynn as Betsy Hamill
- Patsy Lynn as Patsy Hamill
- John Diehl as EPA Agent Frank Elkins
- Dennis Letts as Dr. Schultz
- John Prosky as Aide
- Scott L. Schwartz as "Pimple"
- Rick Johnson as Security
- Andrew Stahl as Agent
- Randy Travis as Ken Adams
- Ernie Lively as Todd
- Lisa Guerrero as Beauty
- David Brisbin as Lawyer
- James Mathers as Marshal Adams
- Marty Stuart as Himself
- Julius R. Nasso as Actor
- Kane Hodder as Bodyguard

== Production ==
In December 1989, it was reported producers Peter Guber and Jon Peters, after establishing themselves at Columbia Pictures following leaving Warner Bros. Pictures, had acquired Fire Down Below along with several other scripts after being forced to abandoned their slate of in development projects at Warner Bros. The script was described as a "fish-out-of-water" drama about a special investigator on a case that takes him into the coal mines of Kentucky. The script by Jeb Stuart was acquired for $750,000. When Frank Price joined Columbia in 1991, the script was briefly put into Turnaround after Price said he didn't like the script.

In March 1993, it was reported that Steven Seagal had entered into a deal with Columbia to star in Fire Down Below one week after Warner Bros. delayed filming on his directorial debut Rainbow Warrior (later released as On Deadly Ground) after executives became concerned about the film's budget. Warner Bros. stated Rainbow Warrior, which was planned to be filmed in Alaska, cited insufficient snowfall as reason for the delay, but the National Weather Service reported that Valdez, Alaska recorded 47 inches of snow on the ground and Nome, Alaska had 10 inches with snow showers forecast throughout the week. This led to rumors in the industry that Warner Bros. was finding excuses to postpone Rainbow Warrior after the film's mid $30 million budget had ballooned into the high $40 million with anonymous sources attributing the cost increases to Seagal's inability to control the production. Additional rumors claimed that Seagal was so annoyed with Warner Bros. that he took the similarly environmentally themed film Fire Down Below as tit for tat for Warner Bros. delay which Warner Bros. denied as Seagal's four-picture deal with Warner Bros. gave Seagal the option to do one film with another studio outside the deal referred to as an "out" movie. Later that month, Rob Friedman, then Warner Bros. President of Worldwide Advertising and Publicity, stated that Seagal would not be making Fire Down Below until 1995 or 1996 as he had to make three more movies for Warner Bros. before making an out movie. Then Columbia production chief, Michael Nathanson, indicated the film was "Go Picture" and voiced the intent of making the movie sometime in the next year with Seagal possibly being offered the position of director.

In December 1993, it was reported that Jon Peters contract with Columbia was set to expire at the end of 1994 while Peters former partner Peter Guber signed a five-year contract to become chairman of Sony Pictures Entertainment with speculation that Peters' development slate would be taken elsewhere including Fire Down Below for which Seagal had a pay or play deal. In March 1994, it was reported that Jon Peters would be returning to Warner Bros. where he would also move Fire Down Below from Columbia.

The film was shot on location in and around Kentucky; parts of the "truck chase scene" were shot at Natural Bridge State Resort Park. Some of the opening scenes were filmed at Cumberland Falls State Resort Park. The cave scenes were filmed in the Great Saltpetre Cave. This was the third, and final time that Kane Hodder worked with Steven Seagal as a stuntman.

Seagal liked the film in part because it was "kind of an environmental movie." He also enjoyed working with Marg Helgenberger. "While I don't think she's a physical, spectacular, drop dead gorgeous woman, at the same time she's a spectacular actress," said Seagal. "Her performance was wonderful."

== Release ==
Fire Down Below was theatrically released in the United States on September 5, 1997. A home video release followed on January 6, 1998.

While Fire Down Below opened to $6.1 million at the #1 spot during its opening weekend, it was during a weekend described as "lackluster" and was only slightly above G.I. Jane at second place with $5.3 million which had held the top stop for the past two weeks.

== Reception ==
=== Box office ===
Fire Down Below was released on September 5, 1997. It grossed $6 million on its opening weekend in the United States and Canada and went on to gross $16.2 million plus $8.3 million internationally for a worldwide total of $24.5 million.

=== Critical response ===
On Rotten Tomatoes, the film has an approval rating of 15% based on 27 reviews, with an average rating of 3.5/10. On Metacritic the film has a score of 40 out of 100, based on reviews from 13 critics. Audiences polled by CinemaScore gave the film an average grade of "B−" on an A+ to F scale.

=== Accolades ===
The film was nominated for four Golden Raspberry Awards at the 18th Golden Raspberry Awards:

- Worst Picture – Julius R. Nasso (lost to The Postman)
- Worst Actor – Steven Seagal (lost to Kevin Costner for The Postman)
- Worst Screen Couple – Seagal and his guitar (lost to Jean-Claude Van Damme and Dennis Rodman for Double Team)
- Worst Original Song – "Fire Down Below" by Seagal and Mark Collie (lost to The Entire Song Score of The Postman)

Seagal was also nominated for Worst Actor at the 1997 Stinkers Bad Movie Awards but lost to Tom Arnold for McHale's Navy.
