= 1997 Stinkers Bad Movie Awards =

Award ceremony presented by the Stinkers Bad Movie Awards in 1997

20th Stinkers Bad Movie Awards
- Date: 1998

Highlights
- Worst Film: Batman & Robin
- Most awards: Batman & Robin (4)
- Most nominations: Batman & Robin (5)

The 20th Stinkers Bad Movie Awards were released by the Hastings Bad Cinema Society in 1998 to honor the worst films the film industry had to offer in 1997. This was the first year that the ballots would be open to the public, which is why percentages of votes for each candidate were listed besides most categories. To celebrate the 20th award ballot, the Lifetime Non-Achievement Award was given out to Chevy Chase and a multitude of other categories, including Worst On-Screen Couple and Worst Director, were introduced. Founder Ray Wright listed Batman & Robin and Crash among his five worst movies of the 1990s, which also included It's Pat, Pokémon: The First Movie, and Nothing but Trouble. While Batman & Robin was a preliminary target and took home several awards, Crash was largely ignored aside from the Founders Award because it was a low-key indie film. The founders also admitted that if they had expanded the Worst Picture ballot to 10 nominees, they would have included B.A.P.S., Excess Baggage, Flubber, Jungle 2 Jungle, and McHale's Navy.

Listed as follows are the different categories with their respective winners and nominees, including Worst Picture and its dishonorable mentions, which are films that were considered for Worst Picture but ultimately failed to make the final ballot (30 total). All winners are highlighted.

== Winners and Nominees ==
=== Worst Picture ===
Film	Production company(s)	Percentage of Votes
Batman & Robin	Warner Bros.	43%
The Fifth Element	Columbia	12%
Lost Highway	Universal Pictures, October Films	8%
The Postman	Warner Bros.	18%
Starship Troopers	TriStar	19%

==== Dishonourable Mentions ====
- Alien Resurrection (Fox)
- An American Werewolf in Paris (Hollywood)
- Anaconda (Columbia)
- B.A.P.S. (New Line)
- Bean (Gramercy)
- Booty Call (Columbia)
- Con Air (Touchstone)
- Double Team (Columbia)
- Excess Baggage (Columbia)
- Face/Off (Paramount)
- Fathers' Day (Warner Bros.)
- Fire Down Below (Warner Bros.)
- Flubber (Disney)
- For Richer or Poorer (Universal)
- Free Willy 3 (Warner Bros.)
- Gone Fishin' (Hollywood)
- Home Alone 3 (Fox)
- I Know What You Did Last Summer (Columbia)
- Jungle 2 Jungle (Disney)
- McHale's Navy (Universal)
- Mr. Magoo (Disney)
- The Pest (TriStar)
- RocketMan (Disney)
- A Smile Like Yours (Paramount)
- Speed 2: Cruise Control (Fox)
- Steel (Warner Bros.)
- 'Til There Was You (Paramount)
- Turbulence (MGM)
- U Turn (TriStar)
- Vegas Vacation (Warner Bros.)

=== Worst Director ===
Recipient	Percentage of Votes
Joel Schumacher for Batman & Robin	33%
Luc Besson for The Fifth Element	7%
Kevin Costner for The Postman	22%
Jan de Bont for Speed 2: Cruise Control	29%
David Lynch for Lost Highway	9%

=== Worst Actor ===
Recipient	Percentage of Votes
Tom Arnold for McHale's Navy	37%
John Leguizamo for The Pest	17%
Joe Pesci for Gone Fishin'	12%
Steven Seagal for Fire Down Below	24%
John Travolta for Mad City	10%

=== Worst Actress ===
Recipient	Percentage of Votes
Alicia Silverstone for Excess Baggage	30%
Halle Berry for B.A.P.S.	28%
Lauren Holly for Turbulence	18%
Bette Midler for That Old Feeling	13%
Sigourney Weaver for Alien Resurrection	11%

=== Worst Supporting Actor ===
Recipient	Percentage of Votes
Jon Voight for Anaconda	31%
Robert Downey Jr. for Hugo Pool	17%
Roddy McDowall for The Second Jungle Book: Mowgli & Baloo	20%
Dean Stockwell for McHale's Navy	10%
Chris Tucker for The Fifth Element	22%

=== Worst Supporting Actress ===
Recipient	Percentage of Votes
Alicia Silverstone for Batman & Robin	45%
Milla Jovovich for The Fifth Element	19%
Frances McDormand for Paradise Road	15%
Sarah Jessica Parker for 'Til There Was You	7%
Winona Ryder for Alien Resurrection	14%

=== Worst Sequel ===
Recipient	Percentage of Votes
Speed 2: Cruise Control (Fox)	31%
Alien Resurrection (Fox)	10%
An American Werewolf in Paris (Hollywood)	14%
Batman & Robin (Warner Bros.)	23%
The Lost World: Jurassic Park (Universal)	22%

=== Worst Screenplay for a Film Grossing Over $100M Worldwide Using Hollywood Math ===
Recipient	Percentage of Votes
Batman & Robin (Warner Bros.), written by Akiva Goldsman; based on characters created by DC Comics	27%
Flubber (Disney), written by John Hughes; based on A Situation of Gravity / The Absent-Minded Professor	17%
George of the Jungle (Disney), story by Dana Olsen; screenplay by Olsen and Audrey Wells; based on the TV series George of the Jungle	21%
The Lost World: Jurassic Park (Universal), written by David Koepp; based on Michael Crichton's novel The Lost World	12%
Dante's Peak (Universal), Director by Roger Donalson	34%
Speed 2: Cruise Control (Fox), story by Jan de Bont and Randall McCormick; screenplay by McCormick and Jeff Nathanson; based on characters created by Graham Yost	23%

=== Worst Resurrection of a TV Show ===
Recipient	Percentage of Votes
McHale's Navy (Universal)	43%
Bean (Gramercy)	19%
Mr. Magoo (Disney)	38%

=== Worst On-Screen Couple ===
Recipient	Percentage of Votes
Jean-Claude Van Damme and Dennis Rodman in Double Team	46%
Tim Allen and Kirstie Alley in For Richer or Poorer	12%
Bette Midler and Dennis Farina in That Old Feeling	8%
Alicia Silverstone and Benicio Del Toro in Excess Baggage	18%
Mark Wahlberg and his fake 13-inch appendage in Boogie Nights	16%

=== The Sequel Nobody Was Clamoring For ===
Recipient	Percentage of Votes
Free Willy 3: The Rescue (Warner Bros.)	39%
Alien Resurrection (Fox)	6%
Home Alone 3 (Fox)	24%
Texas Chainsaw Massacre: The Next Generation (Sony)	21%
Vegas Vacation (Warner Bros.)	10%

=== Most Annoying Fake Accent ===
Recipient	Percentage of Votes
Jon Voight for Anaconda and Most Wanted	31%
Richard Gere in The Jackal	19%
Frances McDormand in Paradise Road	10%
Viggo Mortensen in G.I. Jane	13%
Brad Pitt in The Devil's Own and Seven Years in Tibet	27%

=== Most Painfully Unfunny Comedy ===
Recipient	Percentage of Votes
8 Heads in a Duffel Bag (MGM, Orion)	26%
Fathers' Day (Warner Bros.)	25%
Gone Fishin' (Hollywood)	16%
Mr. Magoo (Disney)	19%
RocketMan (Disney)	14%

=== Most Unwelcome Direct-to-Video Release ===
Recipient	Percentage of Votes
Pamela Anderson Lee's Homemade Porno Video	35%
Another 9 1/2 Weeks	24%
Casper: A Spirited Beginning	10%
Ernest Goes to Africa	16%
The Land Before Time V: The Mysterious Island	15%

=== Lifetime Non-Achievement Award - The Hall of Shame ===
Recipient	Percentage of Votes
Chevy Chase	37%
Mel Brooks	13%
Whoopi Goldberg	26%
Burt Reynolds	24%

=== The Founders Award - What Were They Thinking and Why? ===
- Cats Don't Dance (Warner Bros.)
- Crash (Fine Line)
- Jungle 2 Jungle (Disney)
- Year of the Horse (Universal, October)

== Films with multiple nominations and wins ==
The following films received multiple nominations:

Nominations	Film
5	Batman & Robin
4	Alien Resurrection
4	The Fifth Element
3	McHale's Navy
2	Anaconda
2	Excess Baggage
2	Gone Fishin'
2	Lost Highway
2	The Lost World: Jurassic Park
2	Dante's Peak
2	Mr. Magoo
2	Paradise Road
2	The Postman
2	That Old Feeling

The following films received multiple awards:

Wins	Film
4	Batman & Robin
2	Anaconda
2	McHale's Navy
