= The Pest (1997 film) =

- Promotional poster for The Pest
- Directed by: Paul Miller
- Screenplay by: David Bar Katz
- Story by: John Leguizamo
- Produced by: Bill Sheinberg; Jonathan Sheinberg; Sid Sheinberg
- Starring: John Leguizamo; Jeffrey Jones
- Cinematography: Roy H. Wagner
- Edited by: Ross Albert; David Rawlins
- Music by: Kevin Kiner
- Production companies: TriStar Pictures; The Bubble Factory
- Distributed by: Sony Pictures Releasing
- Release date: February 7, 1997
- Running time: 85 minutes
- Country: United States
- Languages: English; Chinese
- Budget: $8 million
- Box office: $3.6 million

The Pest is a 1997 American black comedy film directed by Paul Miller (in his feature directorial debut) and written by David Bar Katz, inspired by the classic 1924 Richard Connell short story "The Most Dangerous Game".

Comedian John Leguizamo plays a Puerto Rican con artist in Miami, Florida named Pestario Vargas (also known as "Pest") who agrees to be the human target for a German manhunter for a $50,000 reward.

The film was released by TriStar Pictures on February 7, 1997.

== Plot ==
Puerto Rican con artist Pestario "Pest" Vargas owes $50,000 to the Scottish mob, led by Angus, who is eager to exact revenge against Pest so that the Scottish mob will finally be feared. Pest, along with his friends Ninja and Chubby, perform a scam at a festival. While there, Pest promises his girlfriend, Xantha Kent, he will have dinner with her and her parents.

German hunter Gustav Shank, who desires to hunt warriors of different nationalities, decides to hunt an athlete. His servant mistakenly believes Shank has decided to hunt Pest and brings Pest to Shank, who decides to hunt Pest anyway due to how irritating he is. Shank tricks Pest into allowing himself to be hunted, and despite warnings from Shank's son Himmel, Pest decides to participate, since he will get a $50,000 reward if he survives. Pest is brought to Shank's private island, supplied with a tiny gun, and runs into the jungle.

Pest convinces Himmel to get him off the island, and both escape in Shank's boat. Himmel and Pest are attacked by gulls, and Pest swims to shore, meeting up with Chubby and Ninja at a pool party. Shank arrives in a helicopter and Pest, Chubby, and Ninja flee. Pest goes to Xantha's house for the dinner, only for a tracking device Shank has attached to him to explode. Shank arrives and goes after Pest, only to inadvertently tranquilize Xantha's father, Himmel, and Ninja.

Pest and Chubby hide in a nightclub. Shank once again attacks Pest, only for Pest to cover Shank in a pheromone that results in him being swarmed by horny men. Pest and Chubby reunite with Ninja, only for them to be shoved into a car with Angus, who has been convinced by Shank that Pest is trying to skip town. Angus takes Ninja as collateral to ensure Pest pays his debts. Shank reveals he has kidnapped Pest's family, Xantha, and her family, and has them on board a large boat. Pest and Chubby outwit Shank and free the captives. Shank reveals he had poisoned a drink Pest had drunk on the island, and taunts Pest by telling him how to find his reward. Pest collapses, seemingly succumbing to the poison. The next day, Shank discovers his money has been stolen by Pest, who had vomited the poison out due to getting seasick while escaping the island. Pest has also revealed Shank's crimes to the authorities. Shank is dragged away by police officers, while Pest, Chubby, Ninja, Himmel, and Xantha drive off with Shank's money.

== Cast ==
- John Leguizamo as Pestario "Pest" Vargas
- Jeffrey Jones as Gustav Shank
- Edoardo Ballerini as Himmel Shank
- Freddy Rodríguez as Bruce "Ninja"
- Tammy Townsend as Xantha Kent
- Aries Spears as Chubby
- Joe Morton as Mr. Kent
- Charles Hallahan as Angus
- Tom McCleister as Leo
- Ivonne Coll as Gladyz
- Pat Skipper as Glen Livitt

== Production ==
Production of the film was announced by TriStar Pictures and The Bubble Factory alongside Slappy and the Stinkers as two projects the companies would produce. Under the terms of a contract between The Bubble Factory and Universal Studios, the production company could automatically greenlight three to four pictures – budgeted at about $8 million to $35 million each – per year for Universal to distribute. Both this film and Slappy and the Stinkers fell below Universal's threshold and became a first-look pact. Sony fully financed both films. John Leguizamo co-wrote the script with David Bar Katz describing it as "...an 'equal-opportunity-offender comedy'" where no race, creed or color would be left unmocked. Leguizamo claimed that at the time, Universal passed on distributing the film due to its $8 million budget, as the studio wouldn't distribute anything theatrically that didn't have a $10 million budget or higher.

== Reception ==
=== Box office ===
The film came in at #12 in its opening weekend at the box office, with a gross of $1.8 million from 1,205 theaters. The film grossed a total of $3.6 million against an estimated budget of $8 million.

=== Critical response ===
On the review aggregator website Rotten Tomatoes, 4% of 25 critics' reviews are positive, with an average rating of 2.9/10. The website's consensus reads: "The Pest aims for zany comedy with social commentary, misses, and lands squarely at offensive misfire thanks to John Leguizamo's over-caffeinated performance and a script laden with stereotypes." Audiences polled by CinemaScore gave the film an average grade of "B" on an A+ to F scale.

Jeff Millar of the Houston Chronicle wrote that "This film is utterly without discipline or focus in a way that—to one's shame—one eventually finds oddly endearing". Dwayne E. Leslie of Boxoffice magazine said that "The script and Leguizamo's talents don't mesh, so the actor comes off as more offensive than funny." Bill Hoffman of the New York Post gave the comedy three and half out of five stars. Mick LaSalle of San Francisco Chronicle said of Leguizamo's performance "Obviously, someone must have told Leguizamo he's a comic genius. Whoever did that wasn't a good friend." Ken Fox of TV Guide gave the film 1.5 out of 4, and wrote: "Even surrounded by unbearable sloppiness, Leguizamo is fascinating to watch."

Leguizamo was nominated for Worst Actor for his performance in the film at the 1997 Stinkers Bad Movie Awards but lost to Tom Arnold for McHale's Navy.
