= For Richer or Poorer =

1997 comedy film by Bryan Spicer

- Theatrical release poster
- Directed by: Bryan Spicer
- Written by: Jana Howington; Steve LuKanic
- Produced by: Bill Sheinberg; Jon Sheinberg; Sid Sheinberg
- Starring: Tim Allen; Kirstie Alley; Jay O. Sanders; Michael Lerner; Wayne Knight; Larry Miller
- Cinematography: Buzz Feitshans IV
- Edited by: Russell Denove
- Music by: Randy Edelman
- Production company: The Bubble Factory
- Distributed by: Universal Pictures
- Release date: December 12, 1997
- Running time: 115 minutes
- Country: United States
- Language: English
- Budget: $35 million
- Box office: $32.7 million

For Richer or Poorer is a 1997 American slapstick comedy film directed by Bryan Spicer, written by Jana Howington and Steve LuKanic. It stars Tim Allen, Kirstie Alley, Jay O. Sanders, Michael Lerner, Wayne Knight, and Larry Miller, with Miguel A. Núñez Jr., Megan Cavanaugh, Carrie Preston, John Pyper-Ferguson, John Caponera, and Ethan Phillips appearing in supporting roles. It tells the story of a New York City socialite couple who decide to end their spoiled relationship. This is complicated when an accountant they know leaves them the blame for the embezzlements, causing them to go on the run and end up taking refuge with an Old Order Amish family in Intercourse, Pennsylvania.

For Richer or Poorer was released by Universal Pictures on December 12, 1997. The film gained negative reviews from critics and was a box office failure, grossing $32.7 million worldwide against a $35 million budget.

== Plot ==
Manhattan millionaire commercial developer Brad Sexton turns his marriage's 10th anniversary party into a pitch for "The Holy Land", a theme park modeled after Biblical lore. One of the display's special effects catches the wardrobe of Judge Joan Northcutt on fire. Furious, Brad's socialite wife Caroline decides to divorce him.

Meanwhile, Brad's accountant Bob Lachman is stealing the Sextons' millions and filing false tax returns. The money manipulations catch the attention of the Internal Revenue Service (IRS), and field agent Frank Hall demands to meet Bob and Brad. Bob makes Brad his scapegoat. Fearing that the Sextons could be fleeing, Hall orders the freezing of their assets before Brad can call his attorney Phil Kleinmann for help. Egomaniacal IRS Inspector Derek Lester joins Hall to serve the warrant and bring in the Sextons. Bob admits in Brad's phone call to him that all the tax returns are in Brad's name and then flees the country.

Brad flees, steals a cab, and happens to pick up Caroline. The Sextons escape from Hall, Lester, and the police and leave New York. They crash the cab into a rural pond while dodging a cow and spend that night sleeping rough. The next day, they find themselves in Intercourse, Pennsylvania, a small Lancaster County-area community of Old Order Amish. After stealing clothes, they masquerade as Jacob and Emma, a family's expected cousins from Missouri. Samuel and Levinia Yoder, along with their children and parents, make the pair at home.

Gradually, the pair learns to fit in. Brad, with his knowledge of real estate values, helps Samuel's future son-in-law Henner buy land, and Caroline's knowledge of fashion helps their conservative ordnung relax their colorless dress code.

The Sextons rediscover why they fell in love in the first place, largely through their efforts of helping others rather than themselves. As Samuel and Levinia's daughter Rebecca exchanges vows with Henner, the ceremony is interrupted by the state police, Hall, and Lester as the real Jacob and Emma show up. The Sextons are exposed and extradited back to New York.

At the courthouse, Phil shows up informing Judge Northcutt that he found Bob in Zürich and had him extradited back to the United States causing a recess to occur in light of this information. Bob is hauled into the courtroom and Brad thanks him for fixing their marriage while punching Bob for framing him. Northcutt later dismisses the case.

Returning to Intercourse, Brad and Caroline beg Samuel and Levinia for forgiveness. Samuel reveals that he and Levinia knew the whole time of the ruse and put up with it because it was planting season and they needed the extra help. Brad offers to give his watch as a present only to be told that the Amish cannot accept gifts, only trades. He then trades the watch for a Belgian horse named Big John.

During the credits, Brad and Caroline come across the same cow and the land they crashed into, which is now up for sale. As Brad plans to make use of the land, Caroline reveals that she is pregnant with their first child.

== Cast ==
- Tim Allen as Brad Sexton, a New York City socialite and real estate developer
- Kirstie Alley as Caroline Sexton, the wife of Brad
- Jay O. Sanders as Samuel Yoder, the patriarch of the Yoder family
- Michael Lerner as Phil Kleinmann, Brad's lawyer
- Wayne Knight as Bob Lachman, Brad's accountant who commits acts of embezzlement that leads to Brad taking the fall
- Larry Miller as Derek Lester, an IRS inspector
- Miguel A. Núñez Jr. as Frank Hall, an IRS field agent investigating the Sextons who Derek assists
- Megan Cavanagh as Levinia Yoder, the wife of Samuel and matriarch of the Yoder family
- Carrie Preston as Rebecca Yoder, the oldest daughter of Samuel
- John Pyper-Ferguson as Henner Lapp, a suitor who courts Rebecca
- John Caponera as Dave, a real estate broker for Good Guys Realty
- Ethan Phillips as Jerry, a real estate broker for Good Guys Realty and Dave's partner
- Bobby Steggert as Samuel Yoder Jr., the oldest son of Samuel
- Michael Angarano as Sammy Yoder, the youngest son of Samuel
- Kathleen More as Anna Yoder, the youngest daughter of Samuel
- Hunter & Scout Stover as Baby Sam Yoder, the baby son of Samuel
- June Claman as Joan Northcutt, a federal judge that knows the Sextons
- Marla Maples as Cynthia
- Rosemary Knower as Grandma Yoder, the mother of Samuel, wife of Grandpa Yoder, and paternal grandmother of Rebecca, Samuel Jr., Sammy, Anna, and Baby Sam
- David Harscheid as Grandpa Yoder, the father of Samuel, husband of Grandma Yoder, and paternal grandfather of Rebecca, Samuel Jr., Sammy, Anna, and Baby Sam
- Terrence Currier as Joseph, an Amish elder
- Hal Handerson as Thomas, an Amish elder
- Monica Deeter as Hannah Yoder, a relative of Samuel
- Richard Pelzman as Jonathan Yoder, a relative of Samuel
- Johanna Cox as Emma Yoder, a relative of Samuel from Missouri who Caroline poses as
- Stefan Aleksander as Jacob Yoder, a relative of Samuel from Missouri who Brad poses as
- Emily Chamberlain as Evely, Phil's secretary
- Anthony Azizi as Malik Ali Farquhar, a taxicab driver whose taxicab Brad commandeers

== Production ==
The film was shot between April and July 1997 in New York City, Maryland and Pennsylvania. According to the Maryland Film Office in 1997, For Richer or Poorer helped bring in $12 million to $16 million for the state. A significant portion of the film's $35 million budget went to actor Tim Allen, who reportedly received $16 million for the project. Allen shot the film during the break between the sixth and seventh seasons of his sitcom Home Improvement. It is to date the last film by Bryan Spicer.

== Reception ==
For Richer or Poorer was a box office flop, earning $32.7 million on an estimated budget of $35 million. Reviews of the film were mainly negative. It currently holds a 17% approval rating at Rotten Tomatoes based on 24 reviews. On the December 13, 1997 episode of Siskel & Ebert, it received a thumbs down from Roger Ebert and a "marginal thumbs down" from Gene Siskel, with Siskel preferring the more serious moments of the film over the comedic parts. In his other review for the Chicago Sun-Times, Ebert gave the film 2 out of 4 stars. Regarding the film and Tim Allen and Kirstie Alley's performances, he stated: "I admired their sheer professionalism. The plot is a yawner... But they succeed somehow in bringing a certain charm to their scenes, and they never miss with a laugh line." Hollis Chacona of The Austin Chronicle gave it 1 out of 5 stars in December 1997, and labelled it as a "soundly unfunny, roundly implausible movie that purports to extol human values and expose the underbelly of materialistic life." He added, "except for a nasty little turn by Marla Maples as the Queen of Victorious Divorces, and some lovely, bucolic scenery, For Richer or Poorer is not even remotely interesting." Chris Hewitt of The Spokesman-Review criticized the film for making "shameless and humorless fun of the Amish."

At the 1997 Stinkers Bad Movie Awards, Tim Allen and Kirstie Alley were nominated for Worst On-Screen Couple but lost to Jean-Claude van Damme and Dennis Rodman for Double Team. Shortly after her death in 2022, Rolling Stone included For Richer or Poorer on a list of Alley's 14 most memorable roles.
