= Mr. Magoo (film) =

1997 American comedy film

- Theatrical release poster
- Directed by: Stanley Tong
- Written by: Pat Proft; Tom Sherohman
- Based on: Mr. Magoo by Millard Kaufman and John Hubley
- Produced by: Ben Myron
- Starring: Leslie Nielsen; Kelly Lynch; Ernie Hudson; Stephen Tobolowsky; Nick Chinlund; Malcolm McDowell
- Cinematography: Jingle Ma
- Edited by: Michael R. Miller; Stuart Pappé; David Rawlins
- Music by: Mike Tavera
- Production companies: Walt Disney Pictures; UPA Productions
- Distributed by: Buena Vista Pictures Distribution
- Release date: December 25, 1997
- Running time: 87 minutes
- Country: United States
- Language: English
- Budget: $30 million
- Box office: $28.9 million

Mr. Magoo is a 1997 American slapstick comedy film directed by Hong Kong film veteran Stanley Tong (his sole English language film) and written by Pat Proft and Tom Sherohman. Based on UPA's cartoon character of the same name, it was produced by Walt Disney Pictures, and stars Leslie Nielsen as the title character, alongside Kelly Lynch, Matt Keeslar, Nick Chinlund, Stephen Tobolowsky, Ernie Hudson, Jennifer Garner and Malcolm McDowell.

The film was a critical and commercial failure, grossing $28 million, against its $30 million production budget.

== Plot ==
Mr. Quincy Magoo, a wealthy but extremely near-sighted canned vegetable factory owner, goes to the museum to attend a party. While there, Waldo, Mr. Magoo's nephew, spies a woman named Stacey Sampanahoditra, on whom he develops a crush. Later that night, jewel thieves Luanne LeSeur and Bob Morgan steal the museum's beautiful ruby "The Star of Kurdistan" and escape on a boat to Austin Cloquet, Bob's boss.

Meanwhile, Mr. Magoo and his dog Angus go fishing in the same area as the jewel thieves' boat. Luanne picks a fight with Bob and in the scuffle, they lose the ruby which lands in Mr. Magoo's boat unbeknownst to Magoo. Bob goes after the ruby but fails by falling onto the paddle wheel of a paddle boat.

At the museum, the curator and Stacey send two agents: Gustav Anders of the CIA and Chuck Stupak of the FBI to track down the ruby and spy on Mr. Magoo, who they believe stole the ruby. Stacey mentions she was invited to the opera where the Magoos go that night. Anders and Stupak also visit the opera to look for Mr. Magoo who is in the show. At the opera Mr. Magoo meets Luanne who pretends to be a magazine reporter and uncover FBI agent named Prunella Pagliachi. She wishes Mr. Magoo luck at the opera, who immediately takes a liking to her. Stupak sneaks on the stage and fails to find any clue about Mr. Magoo with Mr. Magoo accidentally hitting Stupak with a big tool.

The next morning, Luanne tricks Mr. Magoo into taking her to his house with an injured ankle. Stupak finds a notebook with Luanne's fingerprints on it and realizes who Mr. Magoo is with. He and Anders go to Mr. Magoo's house where Stupak sneaks in looking for the ruby. Mr. Magoo and Luanne arrive at the house and Stupak hides from them. Bob sneaks into Mr. Magoo's house and finds the ruby. Upon being caught in the act, he steals Mr. Magoo's prized Studebaker with the Magoos and Luanne chasing after him in Magoo's Eggplant-mobile. Bob loses them and brings the ruby to Austin.

Austin plans an auction for his criminal friends from around the world and shows them the ruby. Mr. Magoo disguises himself as Ortega Peru, a thief from Brazil who never goes anywhere and joins the auction which is taking place in a communal indoor pool. However, he is discovered when the fake tattoo on his chest is washed away by the water. Luanne breaks up the auction, steals the ruby, and escapes on a snowmobile away from the lair. The government arrests Austin and his friends while Mr. Magoo gives chase on an ironing board and winds up in the middle of a women's skiing competition. Waldo and Angus sneak out of the lair, catch up with Magoo, and track down the ruby.

Angus sees Luanne in disguise as an old woman and spills her purse which gives Mr. Magoo and Waldo a clue about where Luanne is going. The Magoos follow Luanne to Brazil where Waldo spies on the real Ortega and his friends. Mr. Magoo steals a bride dress from Ortega's girlfriend Rosita and is led to the wedding. Mr. Magoo steals the ruby from Ortega and finds himself being chased by Peru's men, the government agents and Luanne. Magoo then is trapped on a raft just before it goes over a waterfall but manages to invert the raft like a parachute so he can gently float to safety. He and Waldo return the ruby to the museum with the government arresting Ortega, Luanne and the people from Brazil.

== Cast ==
- Leslie Nielsen as Mr. Quincy Magoo
  - Greg Burson as Mr. Quincy Magoo (in animated form)
- Kelly Lynch as Luanne "The Black Widow" LeSeur / Prunella Pagliacci
- Ernie Hudson as CIA Agent Gustav Anders
- Stephen Tobolowsky as FBI Agent Chuck Stupak
- Nick Chinlund as Bob Morgan
- Matt Keeslar as Waldo Magoo
- Jennifer Garner as Stacey Sampanahodrita
- Miguel Ferrer as Ortega "The Piranha" Peru
- Malcolm McDowell as Austin Cloquet
- Frank Welker as Angus the Bulldog and the Mandrill

== Production ==
In the late 1980s, Henry G. Saperstein of UPA, the original owners of Mr. Magoo, announced that the film was set for development at Warner Bros. Pictures, with Steve Tisch producing, acquiring the rights to produce its first feature. However, it was stuck at development limbo once that never came into reality. It would be in development again once he entered negotiations with Sony Pictures (which its subsidiary Columbia Pictures had originally distributed UPA cartoons to theatres during the '40s through '60s) and producers Cary Woods and Robert N. Fried for discussions regarding a live-action Mr. Magoo film. During their conversation, Saperstein, who had long-standing relationships with Toho, the owners of the Godzilla franchise, revealed that the film rights to Godzilla were available. Woods and Fried became incredibly excited by the prospect of a Hollywood-produced Godzilla film and they immediately pivoted away from Mr. Magoo, took the idea to Sony leadership, and secured the rights from Toho, which resulted in the 1998 Godzilla film released by TriStar Pictures and directed by Roland Emmerich. As a result, The Walt Disney Company purchased the film rights from Sony, an unprecedented first collaboration between the two as UPA was formed during the aftermath of the Disney animators' strike, with Walt Disney treating the company with contempt throughout most of UPA's career. In October 1995, it was announced Disney was in talks with Leslie Nielsen to star in a live-action adaptation of Mr. Magoo.

Producer Ben Myron had been negotiating with Stanley Tong on doing an unrelated John Woo-type action film until Saperstein caught a screening of Tong's Rumble in the Bronx with Saperstein liking the inclusion of action and comedy and feeling Tong's style would work well with Mr. Magoo. Tong agreed to direct as he wanted to make a film that was not heavily reliant on violence and could be enjoyed by families and felt, as a Disney production, it would give him that opportunity. Nathan Lane was offered the part of the title character but turned it down.

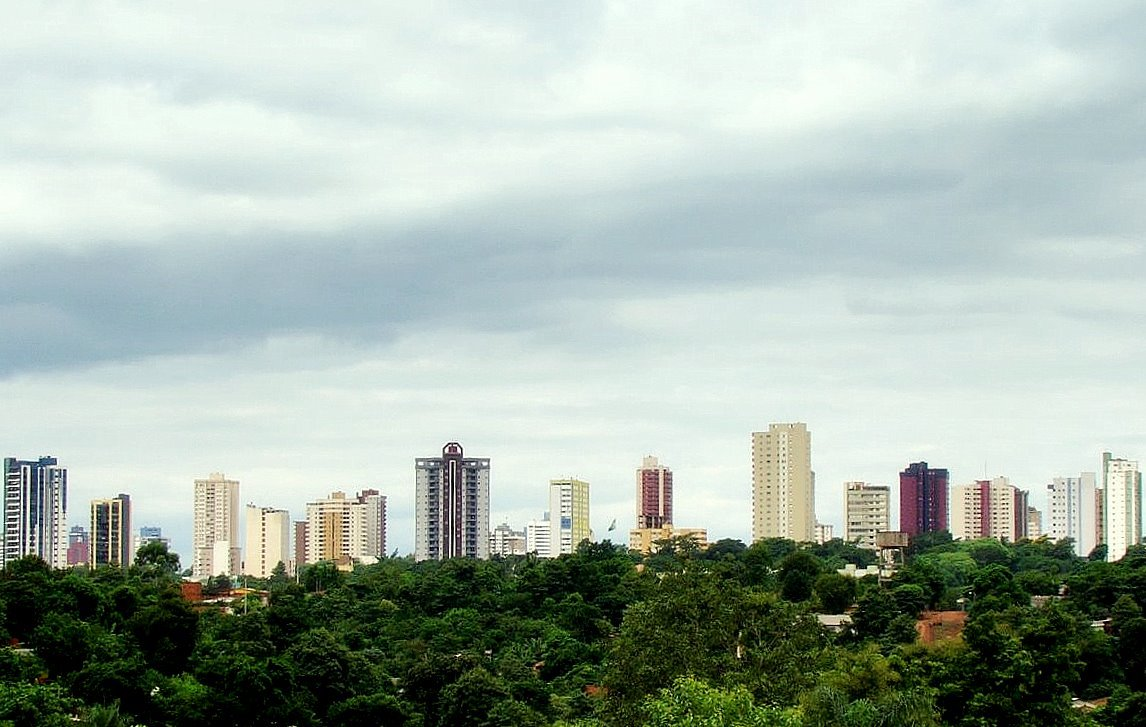
Foz do Iguaçu, Brazil, a country where the movie was filmed.

Filming lasted from March through September 1997. The film was shot in Foz do Iguaçu, Brazil, Argentina and Vancouver, British Columbia, Canada, while the scenes in the museum were filmed in the lobby of the Central Branch of the Vancouver Public Library. The animated sequences were produced by Creative Capers Entertainment and Yowza! Animation, a studio based in Toronto, Ontario, Canada.

== Release ==
Mr. Magoo was released to theatres by Walt Disney Pictures on Christmas Day (December 25) 1997. It was then released on VHS and DVD on July 7, 1998, and later available to stream on Disney+.

== Reception ==
=== Box office performance ===
Mr. Magoo grossed $28.9 million worldwide against a $30 million budget.

=== Critical reception ===
On Rotten Tomatoes the film has an approval rating of 9%, based on reviews from 32 critics, with an average rating of 2.7/10. The site's consensus states: "Leslie Nielsen's affability can't save this dunderheaded update of Mr. Magoo, which delivers a stream of slapstick gags so lame that audiences will feel like they've stepped on a rake." Metacritic, which uses a weighted average, assigned the film a score of 18 out of 100, based on 21 critics, indicating "overwhelming dislike". Audiences polled by CinemaScore gave the film an average grade of "B" on an A+ to F scale.

Movie historian Leonard Maltin called the picture "...pointlessly complicated, with too many mean-spirited characters to suit its target audience. Although the director and cast do what they can, this one goes on forever...You know you're in trouble when even the closing outtakes aren't funny!"

Roger Ebert of The Chicago Sun-Times gave Mr. Magoo half a star out of four in his newspaper review, and called the film "transcendently bad. It soars above ordinary badness as the eagle outreaches the fly." Marc Savlov of the Austin Chronicle gave it 0 out of 5 and said "It's a mess best left to the nitrate ashes of forgotten film and television history." Later reviewing Wrongfully Accused, another Leslie Nielsen film, Savlov said "I was wrong: There are worse things than Mr. Magoo."

=== Controversy ===
Criticism for the film singled out the seemingly mocking portrayal of people with disabilities, although Disney placed a disclaimer right before the closing credits stating Mr. Magoo was not intended as an accurate portrayal of near-sighted or blind people. On Siskel and Ebert, both critics gave the film a thumbs down. They both claimed the disclaimer was funnier than anything in the movie, thought it was unnecessary, and that the film was not offensive towards near-sighted people.

=== Accolades ===
The film received two nominations at the 1997 Stinkers Bad Movie Awards: Worst Resurrection of a TV Show and Most Painfully Unfunny Comedy, losing both to McHale's Navy and 8 Heads in a Duffel Bag, respectively.

== Cancelled sequels ==
Disney wanted Mr. Magoo to become an "international franchise", but following the critical and commercial failure of the film, no sequels were ever produced.
