= Slappy and the Stinkers =

- Theatrical release poster
- Directed by: Barnet Kellman
- Written by: Robert Wolterstorff; Mike Scott
- Produced by: Sidney Sheinberg; Bill Sheinberg; Jonathan Sheinberg
- Starring: B. D. Wong; Bronson Pinchot; Sam McMurray
- Cinematography: Paul Maibaum
- Edited by: Jeff Wishengrad
- Music by: Craig Safan
- Production company: The Bubble Factory
- Distributed by: TriStar Pictures
- Release date: January 23, 1998
- Running time: 78 minutes
- Country: United States
- Language: English
- Budget: $8 million
- Box office: $80,837

Slappy and the Stinkers is a 1998 American adventure comedy film directed by Barnet Kellman, and written by Robert Wolterstorff and Mike Scott. Starring B. D. Wong and Bronson Pinchot, the plot concerns a group of children who try to save an abused sea lion from a greedy circus owner. The film was released on January, 23, 1998 by TriStar Pictures.

== Plot ==
At prestigious private school Dartmoor Academy, principal Morgan Brinway is forcing the second-graders to study opera appreciation. Five feisty kids (leader Sonny, contraption making Loaf, movie loving Domino, sympathetic albeit tough Lucy, and the reluctant participating Witz), nicknamed the "Stinkers" by Mr. Brinway, are secretly skipping class to create chaos on the school grounds. Witz becomes the test pilot for a flying chair, one of Sonny's newest ideas. The Stinkers go to Groundskeeper Roy's shed and steal his leaf blower, with Mr. Brinway's desk chair attached to it. However, they fail to notice that the leaf blower is not entirely duct taped onto the desk chair. When turned on, it flies off the contraption but leaves Witz sitting in the chair. The leaf blower heads straight for Mr. Brinway's new convertible, but runs out of gas before it can destroy the car. However, Roy accidentally obliterates the car's side door with his lawn mower's edging blade. Mr. Brinway warns the Stinkers they will be expelled if they mess up one more time, but they soon rebel while trying to keep a low profile and are involved in even more misadventures.

When the kids discover sea lion Slappy during an aquarium field trip, Sonny and the others decide to free him by smuggling him back onto the school bus and hide him in Mr. Brinway's hot tub; as a form of celebrating their success, they have a party. After Mr. Brinway arrives home earlier than usual, the Stinkers retrieve Slappy and hide him at Witz's house. Roy mistakes the sea lion for a giant gopher and sets out to kill him. Animal broker Anthony Boccoli plans to steal Slappy and sell him to a Bulgarian circus, but some of his attempts to catch Slappy fail.

The next day, the Stinkers take Slappy with them to the beach so they can set him free, but Slappy refuses to leave. The kids discover there was an orca (which they assume is Willy from Free Willy) swimming nearby and that's why Slappy didn't want to go in the water since orcas eat sea lions. Sonny decides they should return Slappy to the aquarium, but they have to first attend a festival at Dartmoor. Roy tries to dispose of Slappy which causes the festival attractions to get ruined. Assuming this was caused by the Stinkers, Mr. Brinway expels them. Boccoli captures Slappy and lies to the kids, saying that he is returning Slappy to the aquarium. When the real aquarium workers show up to get Slappy, they reveal the truth about Boccoli. Unfortunately, the aquarium workers do not have the time, money, or resources to rescue Slappy. The Stinkers decide to rescue Slappy themselves, using Roy's tools to aid them.

The group locates Boccoli's hideout and disposes of him by squirting him with water, blowing sawdust onto his body and shooting him with Roy's gopher bomb gun. After saving Slappy, the Stinkers get chased by Boccoli. Mr. Brinway and the class go on a hiking field trip to look at birds, which gets interrupted when the Stinkers crash through and Mr. Brinway becomes part of the getaway. After being chased to a log flume, the Stinkers and Mr. Brinway escape Boccoli by going down it; Boccoli tries to drown the group by turning on the flume, but the water is blocked by a beaver's dam and once he removes it, a beaver bites him and the water splashes him, causing him to slide down the spillway. The Stinkers, Slappy and Mr. Brinway safely land into the lake below, whereas Boccoli falls onto a floating log. Roy, who is also the school bus driver, ties a rope around Boccoli. Slappy is returned to the aquarium, Mr. Brinway withdraws the Stinkers' expulsion and they become heroes.

== Cast ==
- B. D. Wong as Morgan Brinway, the headmaster of Dartmoor Academy
- Bronson Pinchot as Roy, the groundskeeper of Dartmoor Academy
- Jennifer Coolidge as Harriet, Mr. Brinway's assistant
- Joseph Ashton as Sonny, a leader of the Stinkers
- Gary LeRoi Gray as Domino, a member of the Stinkers
- Carl Michael Lindner as Allen "Witz" Witzowitz, a member of the Stinkers
- Scarlett Pomers as Lucy, a female member of the Stinkers
- Travis Tedford as Loaf, a member of the Stinkers and the group's mechanic
- David Dukes as Spencer Dane Sr.
- Sam McMurray as Anthony Boccoli, a criminal animal broker
- Terry Cain as Nancy, the owner of Springville Aquarium
- Bodhi Pine Elfman as Tag, the employee of Springville Aquarium
- Terri Garber as Mrs. Witzowitz, Witz's mother
- Spencer Klein as Spencer Dane Jr., Spencer's son
- Rick Lawless as Tommy, Nancy's boyfriend and the co-worker of Springville Aquarium
- Richard Taylor Olson as Max Straus, Spencer Jr.'s best friend
- Jamie Donnelly as Aquarium Information Woman
- Frank Welker as the vocal effects of Slappy, a sea lion
  - Welker also provided the vocal effects of Gordon, Mr. Brinway's pet Jack Russell Terrier

== Production ==
Production of the film was announced by TriStar Pictures and The Bubble Factory alongside The Pest as two projects the companies would produce. Under the terms of a contract between The Bubble Factory and Universal Studios, the production company could automatically greenlight three to four pictures – budgeted at about $8 million to $35 million each – per year for Universal to distribute. Both this film and The Pest fell below Universal's threshold and became a first-look pact. Sony fully financed both films.

The film was partially shot at Cabrillo Marine Aquarium.

== Reception ==
On review aggregator Rotten Tomatoes the film holds a 0% rating based on reviews from 4 critics.

Roger Ebert's review gave the film 2 stars and commented: "Slappy and the Stinkers filled me with shreds of hope: Was it possible that this movie, about five kids who kidnap a sea lion, would not be without wit?"

Variety found that "Filled to the gills with slapstick humor, the improbably titled “Slappy and the Stinkers” could well have been sold as “The Little Rascals” meets “Free Willy.”' In a review for The New York Times, Lawrence van Gelder stated, "On a dark winter's day, other 7-year-olds whose film memory bank remains similarly and understandably undernourished may find "Slappy and the Stinkers" a welcome alternative to an afternoon of snow-filled galoshes." while TV Guide's retrospective review was more negative: "Kids still young enough to be hooked on Saturday morning cartoons may enjoy this self-consciously cliché-ridden kiddie flick, but it will be torture for their adult chaperones." The Catholic News and Herald called it "rarely amusing and anything but cute."

Another even more negative review described the film as follows: "Slappy and the Stinkers is the kind of generic-brand, pseudo-Disney children's comedy that you'll see playing on the VCR in a pediatrician's waiting room, and which will one day be logged into evidence after a receptionist loses her mind from watching it all day and murders someone. It was conjured into existence, perhaps using dark magicks, after the success of Free Willy made marine animals all the rage in Hollywood."

=== Box office ===
The film received a limited theatrical release, and made $34,488 in its first weekend of three weeks of theatrical exhibition. It earned a total box office gross of $80,837.
