= A Simple Wish =

1997 film by Michael Ritchie

- Theatrical release poster
- Directed by: Michael Ritchie
- Written by: Jeff Rothberg
- Produced by: Sid Sheinberg; Jon Sheinberg; Bill Sheinberg
- Starring: Martin Short; Mara Wilson; Robert Pastorelli; Amanda Plummer; Francis Capra; Kathleen Turner
- Cinematography: Ralf D. Bode
- Edited by: William S. Scharf
- Music by: Bruce Broughton
- Production company: The Bubble Factory
- Distributed by: Universal Pictures
- Release date: July 11, 1997
- Running time: 90 minutes
- Country: United States
- Language: English
- Budget: $28 million
- Box office: $8.3 million

A Simple Wish is a 1997 American children's-fantasy-comedy film directed by Michael Ritchie, and starring Martin Short, Mara Wilson, and Kathleen Turner. The film is about Murray (Short), a bumbling male fairy godmother who tries to prove himself capable by helping a young girl named Annabel Greening (Wilson) fulfill her wish that her father, aspiring actor Oliver (Robert Pastorelli), wins the leading role in a Broadway musical.

It was the final film to be directed by Michael Ritchie, before his death in 2001 (not counting The Fantasticks (2000), which was shot in 1995). It bombed at the box office and received mixed to negative reviews from critics with praise for its cast and humor but criticisms for its weak plot.

== Plot ==
Carriage driver Oliver Greening aspires to perform on Broadway and, despite an outstanding audition for a new musical based on A Tale of Two Cities, he loses out to the seasoned Tony Sable, who is considered more bankable than the unknown Oliver.

Later that night, Anabel, Oliver's young daughter, does not convince her brother Charlie that fairy godmothers exist, and after they fall asleep, she awakens to find Murray, a male fairy godmother, in her room. Murray, who is treated with disdain for being a man in a female-dominated profession, agrees to grant Anabel's wish that her father get the part so that her family will not have to move to Nebraska, hoping that by doing so he will be taken seriously.

Hortence, the head fairy godmother, oversees the North American Fairy Godmothers Association (NAFGA)'s annual meeting. All participants must turn in their wands so that no trouble occurs. The evil witch Claudia, who was banished from the NAFGA for her selfish use of magic, tricks Hortence's receptionist with an apple that puts her to sleep before casting a spell that makes Hortence paper-thin and lodges bricks in her mouth to stop her from speaking. She then steals all the collected wands; Murray arrives late to the conference and does not check his wand in, making it the only one she does not have.

Seeing Murray accidentally left his wand behind in his rush to make it to the conference, Anabel plans to return it to him. However, Charlie breaks it. Anabel glues the broken pieces together and gives it to Murray, only to wind up in Nebraska after the former botches a spell for instantaneous travel. Duane, an angry local threatens them, and Murray tries to turn him into a tiny rabbit but instead transforms him into a giant rabbi. Before the giant stomps on them, Murray casts the travel spell again, and they wind up in the Central Park zoo just as Oliver arrives in his carriage with Charlie.

Anabel begs Murray to grant her wish, but he accidentally turns Oliver into a statue. To fix it, the three go to ask Hortence for help, only to find her still under Claudia's curse. While Murray fixes his wand with Charlie's help, Hortence reveals that, in keeping with the rules governing fairy godmothers, Anabel must break Murray's spell by midnight, or Oliver will be a statue forever. Claudia, meanwhile, realizes that Hortense had secretly given her wand to Murray so as to keep her from regaining her full power.

At the theatre, Anabel asks Murray to try sabotaging Sable's audition. First, he tries to make it rain on the stage, but the weak downpour is dismissed as a simple technical problem, and the audition continues. Then she asks him to give Sable a "frog in his throat" to impair his singing. Murray takes this literally, and frogs start hopping out of Sable's mouth, shocking everyone.

Nevertheless, Sable is given the part as the director Lord Richard refuses to wait for Oliver and wants to get the show into production. Boots, Claudia's dog-turned-human servant, finds them. Murray and Anabel trick Boots into taking them to Claudia by begging her not to. Claudia demands that they hand over her wand, and when they refuse, she resorts to torture by enchanting them to dance for her amusement until they are worn out.

Anabel keeps Claudia distracted while Charlie attempts to give Murray the wand, but Boots manages to grab it. Murray then plays on Boots being unhappy with the way Claudia treats her to convince her that he should have the wand instead of her mistress. Boots jumps into Murray's arms and he takes the wand. Claudia casts a spell intending to target them both, but the spell accidentally causes her to get zapped into the mirror, which she accidentally shatters after desperately trying to escape by banging on it, keeping her imprisoned for eternity.

Murray, Charlie, and Anabel return to Central Park and restore Oliver just in time for him to be given the part of Sable's understudy. To grant Anabel's wish, Murray appears backstage and causes Sable to slip on a bucket and twist his ankle. The resulting temper tantrum gets him fired and Oliver, his understudy, takes over. Charlie and Anabel watch the show with Murray and the other fairy godmothers, including Hortence, who is shown to be freed from Claudia's spell. The movie ends with Murray taking Boots for a walk through New York City at night.

== Cast ==
- Martin Short as Murray: The first male fairy godmother.
- Mara Wilson as Anabel Greening: Oliver's daughter and Charlie's younger sister.
- Kathleen Turner as Claudia: A former fairy godmother turned witch who seeks revenge for having her wand taken away.
- Robert Pastorelli as Oliver Greening: Anabel and Charlie's father who works as a coachman and dreams of becoming a Broadway star.
- Amanda Plummer as Boots: A dog enchanted by Claudia into a human woman, who serves her mistress loyally despite being pushed around.
- Francis Capra as Charlie Greening: Oliver's son and Anabel's older brother.
- Ruby Dee as Hortence: The head of NAFGA.
- Teri Garr as Rena: Hortence's secretary.
- Alan Campbell as Tony Sable: A conceited and arrogant actor.
- Jonathan Hadary as Lord Richard: A playwright and director.
- Deborah Odell as Jeri: Oliver's agent.
- Lanny Flaherty as Duane: A motel owner who lives in Nebraska.
- Jack McGee as Officer Davis York: A police officer that Murray has an encounter with one night.

== Production ==
In August 1995, The Bubble Factory acquired Jeff Rothberg's spec script for A Simple Wish about a fairy godmother who loses her magic wand in a six figure deal.

Filming on A Simple Wish took place from July through October of 1996.

The film's computer-generated imagery effects were generated by Blue Sky Studios which marked one of the studio's earlier efforts in feature films, along with previous contributions to Joe's Apartment and Alien Resurrection, following the company's previous work primarily in television advertisements.

Martin Short, who plays the fair godmother Murray, stated the list of actors who actually wanted the part was pretty scant and that aside from him only Jerry Mathers and Frank Stallone voiced a desire to play the character. Short complimented co-star Mara Wilson on her ability to maintain a straight face with Mara crediting her ability to working with Robin Williams on Mrs. Doubtfire. When Short was questioned about the unmasculine nature of playing a male fairy godmother, Short responded:

Let them snicker. It's a great part, and, after all, I'm an actor. If anyone wants to laugh too, that’s fine.

== Release ==
The film was theatrically released on July 11, 1997. A home video release would follow on December 16, 1997.

== Reception ==
Reception to the movie was negative, with Pixelated Geek's Cinerina stating that while the movie's jokes might not appeal to adults, the movie would have appeal for a younger audience. Roger Ebert gave the film one and half stars, saying "When family audiences avoid inspired films like The Secret Garden (1993), The Little Princess (1995) and Shiloh (1996), why would they choose a pallid exercise like this?" ReelViews and The Austin Chronicle both reviewed the film, with The Chronicle stating that "The concept's good... But this family film about an incompetent fairy godmother named Murray (Short), is shy several handfuls of fairy dust."

On review aggregator website Rotten Tomatoes, the film has an approval rating of 20% based on 20 reviews.

== See also ==
- List of films about witchcraft
