= The Bubble Factory =

Production company

- Industry: Film
- Founded: Beverly Hills, California (August 1995)
- Founder: Sidney Sheinberg; Bill Sheinberg; Jon Sheinberg
- Headquarters: United States

The Bubble Factory is an independent film production company founded by former MCA Inc. president and COO Sid Sheinberg with his sons, Jon and Bill in August 1995. The company was formed after MCA was taken over by Seagram in June 1995. The Bubble Factory was financed by Seagram and produced films for release by Universal Pictures, with budgets in the $30–50 million range. Sheinberg, however, could take a film to another studio if Universal passed.

In June 1997, The Bubble Factory and Universal ended its partnership, owing to the disappointing box-office of the former's output. The Sheinbergs subsequently relaunched The Bubble Factory as an independent operation.

The name of the company reportedly came from Sid Sheinberg's wife, Lorraine Gary. When a reporter came to interview Sid, Gary responded that her husband was in their backyard with their grandchildren blowing bubbles.

== Filmography ==
- Flipper (1996)
- The Pest (1997)
- That Old Feeling (1997)
- McHale's Navy (1997)
- A Simple Wish (1997)
- For Richer or Poorer (1997)
- Slappy and the Stinkers (1998)
- Playing Mona Lisa (2000)
- Bad Girls from Valley High (2005)
- Made in Brooklyn (2007)
- The Devil's Tomb (2009)
- Creature (2011)
- What Lola Wants (2015)
- Chapter & Verse (2017)
- Half Magic (2018)
