= Great Saltpetre Cave =

Cave in Rockcastle County, Kentucky

Coordinates: 37°22′01″N 84°17′15″W

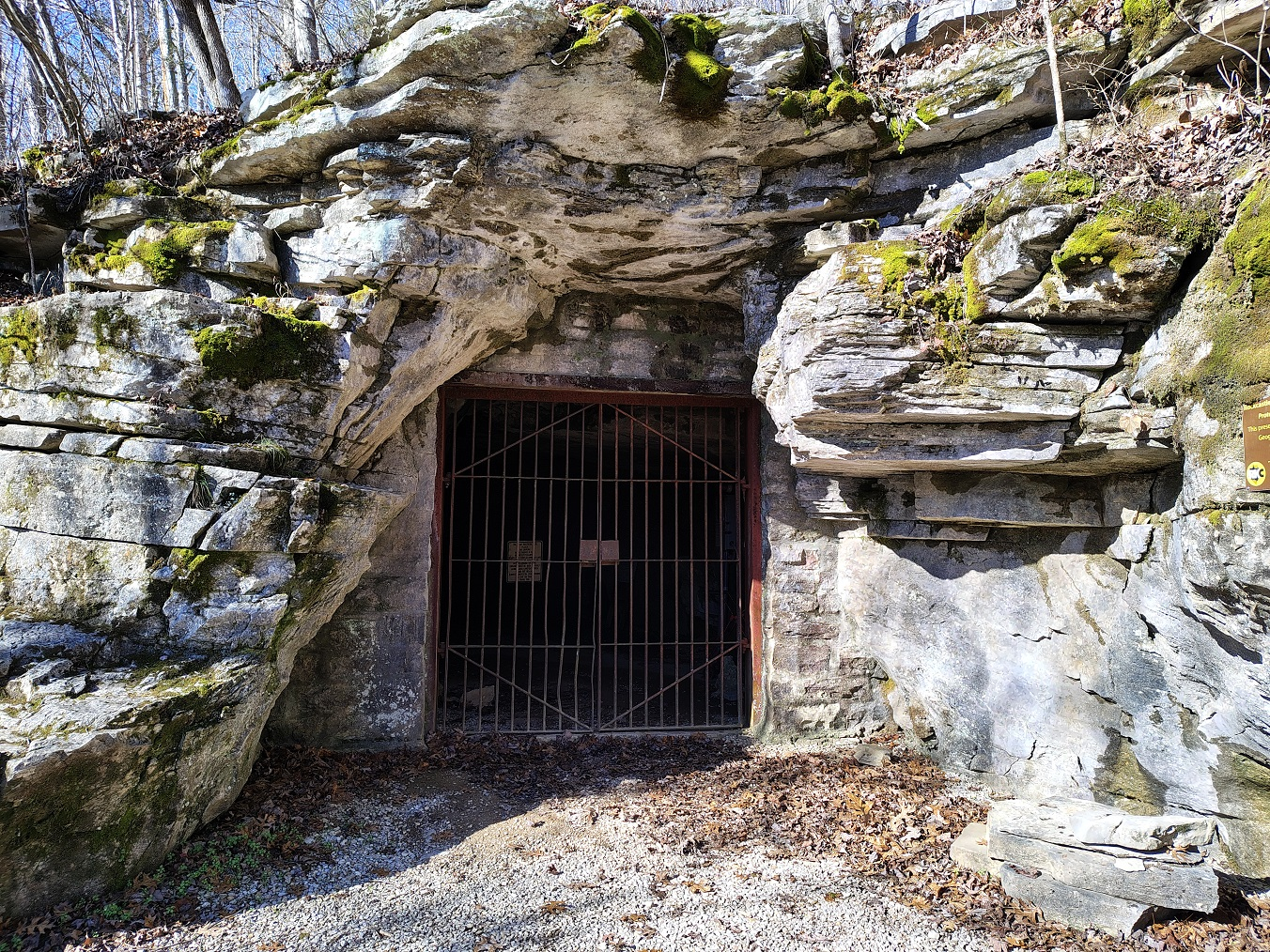
Entrance gate into the Great Saltpetre Cave

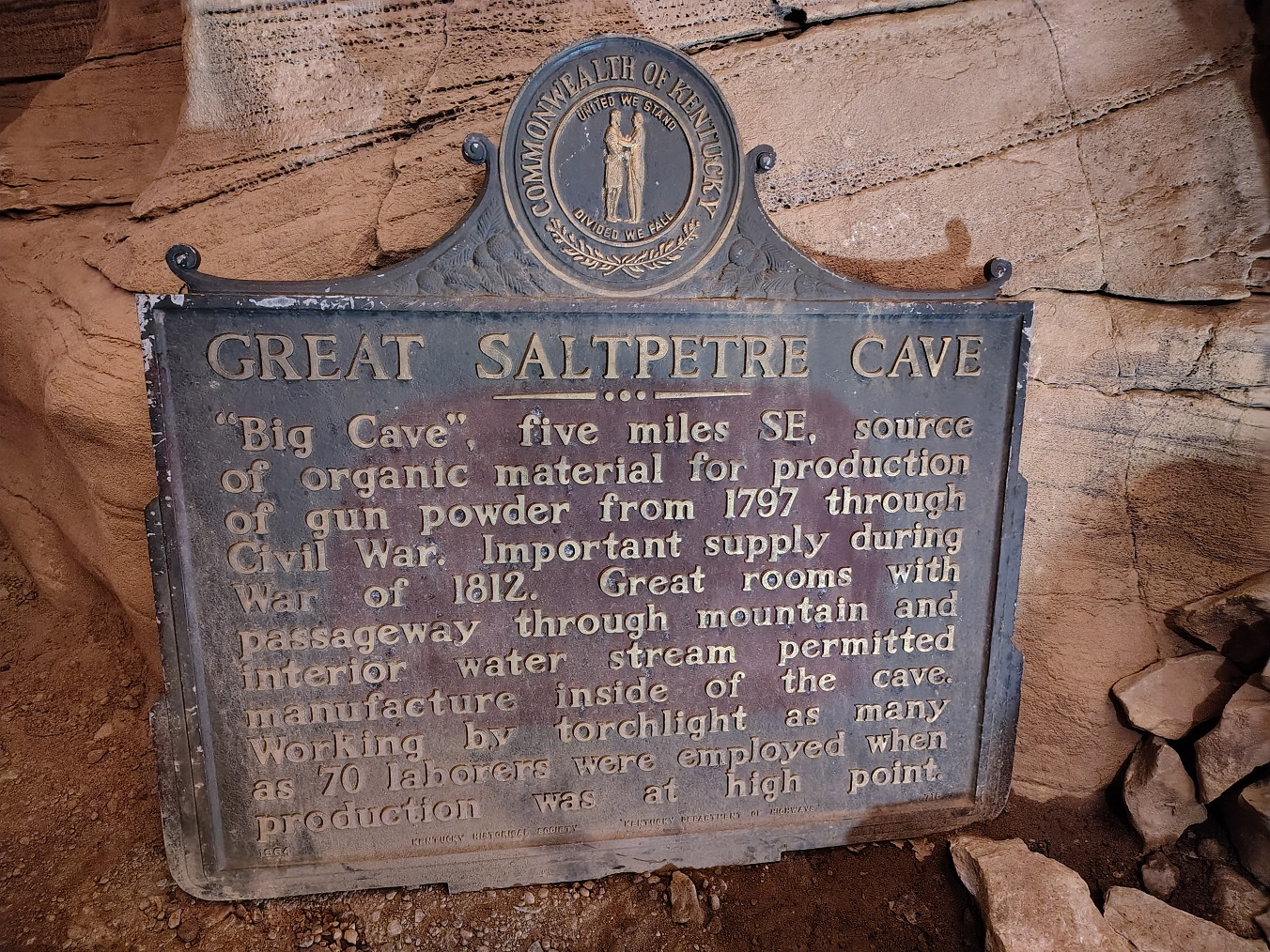
A sign inside

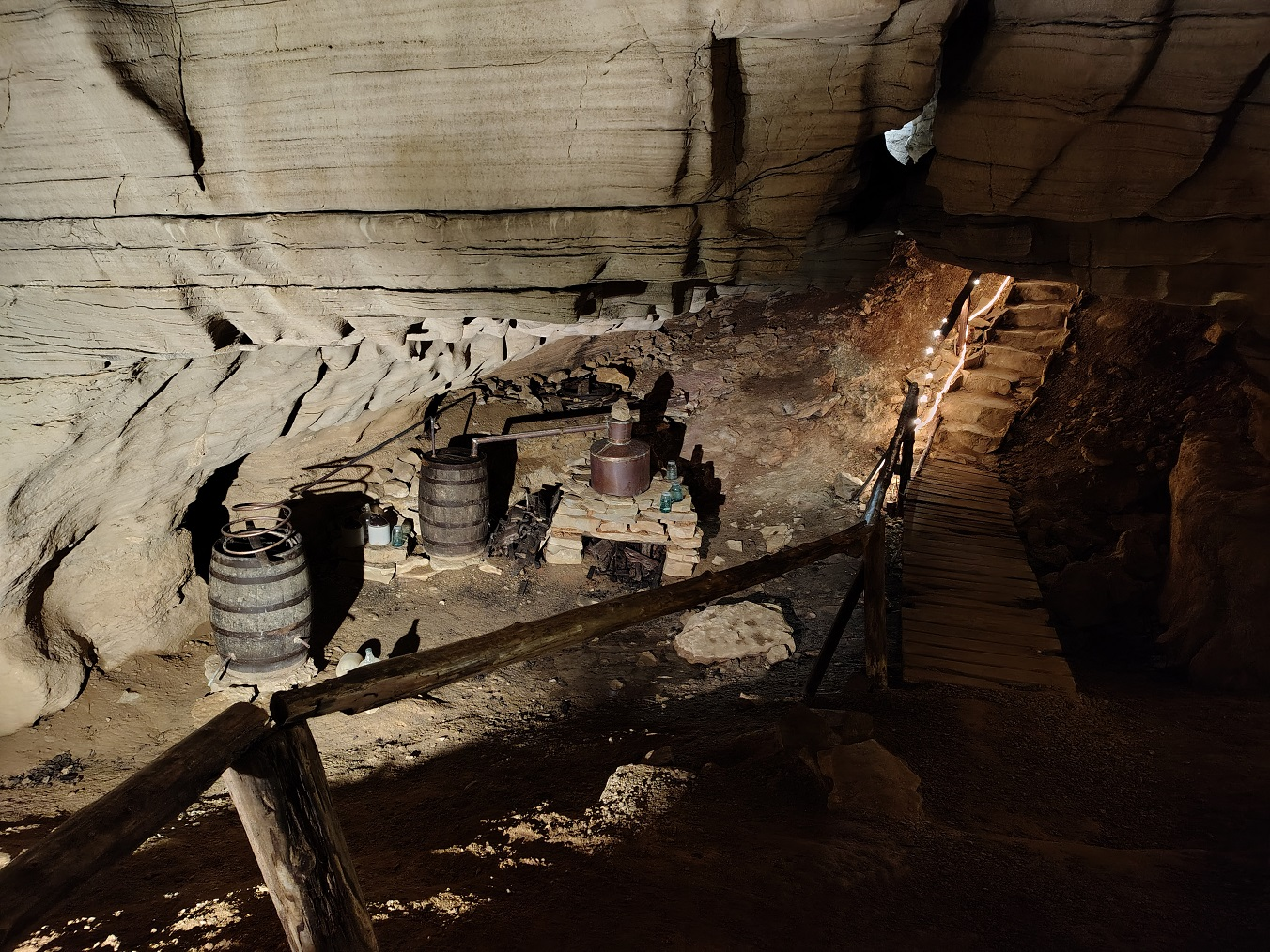
Display of stills and equipment

The Great Saltpetre Cave is a notable limestone cave located in Rockcastle County in southeastern Kentucky. During the War of 1812, it served as an important source of saltpeter, a vital component of gunpowder Also known as black powder.

The cave was listed on the National Register of Historic Places in 2013, and is within the boundary of the Daniel Boone National Forest. Other names include Kincaid's Cave and The Great Cave on Crooked Creek.

Robert Baker discovered the cave in the late eighteenth century. A stream ran through the cave, and was wide enough so that oxcarts could be used to bring the saltpeter above ground. However, torchlights had to be used to light the cave so that workers could mine the saltpeter from the ground.

At the cave, calcium nitrate, also called niter, is leached from dry soil. When Doctor Samuel Brown, a Transylvania University professor of anatomy, chemistry, and surgery, gave in Philadelphia, Pennsylvania in 1806 the first scientific description of Kentucky's saltpeter production, he drew mainly from the experiences of the Great Saltpetre Cave. As with most saltpeter caves, the land above the cave is a hardwood forest-covered plateau. Typically the saltpeter would be sent to Lexington, Kentucky to be made into gunpowder.

During the War of 1812, sixty to seventy men were employed to mine the cave of its saltpeter, deemed necessary as British blockades prevented saltpeter shipments from overseas. Many of the workers at the cave were slaves. To a lesser degree the cave was also mined during the Mexican–American War and the American Civil War. During the later war, the Union soldiers that worked at the cave also lived in the cave, due to its 58 °F (14 °C) year-around temperature giving respite from cold winters and hot summers.

For a time, ending in the 1970s, Great Saltpetre Cave was a commercial cave, and was open not only for tours, but also for ballroom dances, a museum, and weddings. However, the guests would often damage the cave formations by taking souvenirs. Some would also leave their names in the cave, the most notable of which was Daniel Boone.

Today the cave is owned by the Rockcastle Karst Conservancy, as part of the 300-acre (1.2 km^{2}) Great Saltpetre Preserve, off Kentucky State Route 1004. Overnight camping stays are possible upon request if the requester belongs to certain organizations. Artifacts from the cave's mining days are still visible at the site.

The 1997 Steven Seagal film Fire Down Below was partially filmed at the cave.
