= Turbulence (1997 film) =

- Theatrical release poster
- Directed by: Robert Butler
- Written by: Jonathan Brett
- Produced by: Martin Ransohoff; David Valdes
- Starring: Ray Liotta; Lauren Holly; Hector Elizondo
- Cinematography: Lloyd Ahern II
- Edited by: John Duffy
- Music by: Shirley Walker
- Production company: Rysher Entertainment
- Distributed by: MGM Distribution Co.
- Release date: January 10, 1997
- Running time: 100 minutes
- Country: United States
- Language: English
- Budget: $55 million
- Box office: $11.5 million

Turbulence is a 1997 American action thriller film directed by Robert Butler and starring Ray Liotta and Lauren Holly. It was produced by Rysher Entertainment and distributed by MGM Distribution Co. and released on January 10, 1997 to negative reviews and the film was a box office bomb, grossing $11.5 million against a $55 million budget.

== Plot ==
Ryan Weaver, an accused serial killer and rapist, is arrested in New York City despite his claims of innocence. Even though police lieutenant Aldo Hines broke protocol during the arrest by assaulting Weaver, the authorities have enough hard evidence to have him extradited to Los Angeles to face trial. Weaver and another prisoner, a bank robber named Stubbs, are escorted by four U.S. marshals onto a TransContinental Airlines 747. Even though it is Christmas Eve, the 747 is nearly empty, with only eleven people on board.

During the flight, Stubbs breaks free while using the bathroom and begins a shootout with the marshals. A stray bullet punches a hole in the fuselage, causing explosive decompression, before the hole is sealed with a briefcase. Amidst the chaos, the captain is fatally shot and the first officer is knocked out when his head slams into the yoke, disengaging the autopilot in the process. Weaver frees himself and attempts to save the last remaining marshal, but fails when Stubbs shoots him dead after being shot himself. Weaver enters the cockpit and finds the co-pilot unconscious but breathing.

Weaver appears to be horrified by the ordeal, increasing the passengers' trust in him. With the flight crew lost, Teri Halloran, a flight attendant, makes her way into the cockpit and learns she is the only one left capable of keeping the 747 from crashing. The co-pilot is heavily implied to have been murdered by Weaver off-screen. To make matters worse, the plane is heading into a storm which threatens severe turbulence.

Weaver's behavior becomes increasingly erratic and paranoid, suffering nervous breakdowns. He locks the passengers in the crew's cabin, then attacks and strangles Maggie, one of the other flight attendants, to death. Weaver then calls Hines at the FBI control center at LAX and threatens to crash the 747 into their facility, stating that he is willing to do anything to avoid being arrested. Weaver reveals to Teri that he committed the murders and attacks her, but she manages to trap him below deck.

After the plane survives severe turbulence, Teri must be instructed by radio on how to reprogram the autopilot to land at LAX. Her task is complicated by Weaver's obscene and constant interruptions. Weaver breaks into the avionics bay and smashes the server running the primary autopilot software, rendering the first landing attempt unsuccessful and forcing a last second go-around. The plane skims a rooftop Japanese restaurant and a multi-story parking garage, but regains the air, though the landing gear picks up a Ford Ranger pickup. The backup autopilot engages, allowing Teri to make efforts to turn the plane around. However, an Air Force officer at LAX sends an F-14 Tomcat to intercept the 747.

Teri begs the authorities not to have her shot down, insisting she can land the plane. Weaver breaks into the cockpit with an axe and tries to kill her, but the F-14 destroys the truck instead, shaking the 747 and giving Teri a chance to attack. Teri retrieves a .38 revolver and, in the midst of Weaver's assault, manages to load a bullet and shoots Weaver through the head, killing him. She returns to the pilot's seat and, with radio assistance, safely lands the 747 using the autopilot. Despite Weaver's claims that he killed them all, the other crew and passengers are found alive.

== Cast ==
- Ray Liotta as Ryan Weaver
- Lauren Holly as Teri Halloran
- Brendan Gleeson as Stubbs
- Hector Elizondo as Detective Aldo Hines
- Rachel Ticotin as Rachel Taper
- Jeffrey DeMunn as Brooks
- John Finn as Sinclair
- Ben Cross as Captain Sam Bowen
- Catherine Hicks as Maggie
- Heidi Kling as Betty
- J. Kenneth Campbell as Captain Matt Powell
- Michael Harney as Marshall Douglas
- Grand L. Bush as Marshall Arquette

== Production ==
The spec script was purchased by Rysher Entertainment for $1 million. The film was announced to be in development in May 1995. The film was part of a four picture distribution deal between Rysher and Metro-Goldwyn-Mayer (MGM).

== Music ==
The music score was composed and conducted by Shirley Walker. In 1997 a promotional CD was released containing almost the entire score in a non-chronological order

Later, in 2013, specialized music label La-La Land Records released the full score in its entirety and in chronological order

== Reception ==
=== Box office ===
Turbulence grossed $11 million domestically on a $55 million budget.

=== Critical reception ===
Rotten Tomatoes, a review aggregator, gave Turbulence an approval rating of 18% with four positive and 18 negative out of 22 reviews; the average rating was 4 out of 10. Audiences polled by CinemaScore gave the film an average grade of "B−" on an A+ to F scale.

Both Roger Ebert and James Berardinelli rated the film one star out of four, denouncing the implausible storyline as well as the casting of Lauren Holly as an action heroine. G. Allen Johnson of the San Francisco Examiner called the film "an absolute bore".

Lauren Holly's performance in the film earned her a Razzie Award nomination for Worst Actress, though she lost to Demi Moore for G.I. Jane. Turbulence was also nominated for Worst Reckless Disregard for Human Life and Public Property but lost to Con Air. At the Stinkers Bad Movie Awards, Holly was nominated for Worst Actress but lost to Alicia Silverstone for Excess Baggage.

== Sequels ==
Despite its box office failure, the film did well enough on home video to become a trilogy with two new direct-to-video sequels. They are Turbulence 2: Fear of Flying and Turbulence 3: Heavy Metal, each with a different cast.
