= The Postman (film) =

1997 film by Kevin Costner

- Theatrical release poster
- Directed by: Kevin Costner
- Screenplay by: Eric Roth; Brian Helgeland
- Based on: The Postman by David Brin
- Produced by: Jim Wilson; Steve Tisch; Kevin Costner
- Starring: Kevin Costner; Will Patton; Larenz Tate; Olivia Williams; James Russo; Tom Petty
- Cinematography: Stephen F. Windon
- Edited by: Peter Boyle
- Music by: James Newton Howard
- Production company: Tig Productions
- Distributed by: Warner Bros.
- Release date: December 25, 1997
- Running time: 177 minutes
- Country: United States
- Language: English
- Budget: $80 million
- Box office: $30 million

The Postman is a 1997 American epic post-apocalyptic adventure film produced and directed by Kevin Costner, who plays the lead role. The screenplay was written by Eric Roth and Brian Helgeland, based on David Brin's 1985 book of the same name. The film also features Will Patton, Larenz Tate, Olivia Williams, James Russo, and Tom Petty. Set in a post-apocalyptic neo-Western United States in the then near-future year of 2013, the film follows an unnamed nomad who, after finding a United States Postal Service uniform, unwittingly sparks a movement to restore the United States that challenges the rule of a tyrannical warlord.

Released on December 25, 1997 by Warner Bros., The Postman was panned by critics, who criticized the performances, screenplay, direction, long runtime, and Costner's decision to cast himself in the film. The film grossed $30 million worldwide against a budget of $80 million. It was nominated for three Saturn Awards and won all five of its Golden Raspberry Award nominations, including Worst Picture.

== Plot ==
In the late 20th century, unexplained apocalyptic disasters have devastated the world. Most knowledge and technology from the past has apparently been lost, and the former United States reverts to an unconnected pre-industrial society.

In 2013, a nomad traveling to St Rose, Oregon wanders the Western U.S., trading performances of long-forgotten Shakespearean plays for food and water. In one town, the nomad is impressed into the Holnists, a neo-feudalist militia obsessed with a misinterpreted self-help book that serves as the region's tyrannical authority, led by General Bethlehem. The nomad, dubbed "Shakespeare" by Bethlehem, faces harassment by Captain Idaho, who mentions Colonel Getty once challenged Bethlehem for leadership; Bethlehem won the fight and mutilated Getty. The nomad is sent to kill a lion, but he escapes by jumping into a river. Idaho arrives and forces the nomad and another conscript to fight to the death. After the other conscript turns on him, Idaho kills the conscript, but before he can shoot the nomad, the lion kills him. The nomad flees and takes refuge in an abandoned United States Postal Service Jeep DJ, burning letters and wearing the long-deceased postal carrier's coat to stay warm.

Donning the postal uniform and mail bag, the nomad arrives in the town of Pineview and is held at gunpoint by their leader, Sheriff Briscoe. To avoid execution, the nomad claims to be a "Postman" from the restored U.S. federal government, presenting a letter addressed to elderly villager Irene March as proof. The Postman inspires a teenager, Ford Lincoln Mercury, who he swears in as a postal carrier and helps reopen Pineview's post office. That evening, the Postman is approached by Abby and her husband Michael, who is sterile, to conceive a child for them, which the Postman later does. The following morning, the Postman leaves for the town of Benning, taking Pineview's mail and packages with him.

The postman delivers letters to Benning, bringing the residents hope. Meanwhile, during a raid on Pineview, Bethlehem learns of the Postman's claim of a restored government in Minneapolis. Fearing his loss of power if word spreads, Bethlehem has the post office razed, kills Michael and abducts Abby. Benning repels a raid by Bethlehem, and the Postman suggests negotiation. The townspeople ask the Postman to negotiate for them; however, General Bethlehem does not recognize the Postman, refuses to negotiate, and orders him killed. Abby helps rescue the Postman, before the Postman and Abby flee into the surrounding mountains, where they recover over the winter in an abandoned cabin. Abby tells the Postman she is pregnant with his baby. In the spring, they leave and encounter another postal carrier, who reveals that Mercury has kept the Postal Service alive by recruiting other carriers and opening more post offices, connecting settlements across the former U.S. and forming a quasi-society in the "Restored United States".

Bethlehem, threatened by the rise of the Restored U.S., persecutes and publicly executes postal carriers. Wracked by guilt for their deaths, the Postman reads a fake announcement from the President of the Restored U.S. ordering the Postal Service to disband, and writes a confession to Bethlehem admitting that the Restored U.S. was a lie. Bethlehem orders the execution of Mercury and another postal carrier. Bethlehem stops the execution, killing only the other postal carrier himself and choosing to keep Mercury as a bargaining chip, before redoubling his efforts to capture the Postman. The Postman, Abby, and a group of young postal carriers travel to Bridge City, tailed by Holnist scouts, who reveal Bethlehem is looking for the Postman.

The Postman organizes a Restored U.S. Army to face the Holnists in a pitched battle. Unwilling to allow further bloodshed, the Postman reveals to Bethlehem that he is "Shakespeare" and challenges him to a duel for power with their troops as witnesses; per Holnist traditions (as the Postman shows the Holnist branding on his shoulder which he received, entitling him to challenge), Bethlehem accepts. The Postman wins the hand-to-hand fight, but spares Bethlehem's life to maintain morale. Bethlehem tries to shoot the Postman as he turns away, but is shot dead by Getty, who disarms the Holnists. Later, the Postman returns to Abby, meeting his newborn daughter, named Hope.

Thirty years later in 2043, the Postman dies at the age of 70. His adult daughter Hope speaks at a ceremony unveiling a memorial honoring his efforts in St. Rose, part of the Restored U.S., with the implication that modern society and technology have returned following the country's reestablishment.

== Cast ==
- Kevin Costner as The Postman
- Will Patton as General Bethlehem
- Larenz Tate as Ford Lincoln Mercury
- Olivia Williams as Abby Cartwright
- James Russo as Captain Idaho
- Tom Petty as Bridge City Mayor
- Daniel von Bargen as Pineview Sheriff Briscoe
- Scott Bairstow as Luke
- Giovanni Ribisi as Bandit 20
- Roberta Maxwell as Irene March
- Joe Santos as Colonel Getty
- Ron McLarty as Old George
- Brian Anthony Wilson as Woody
- Peggy Lipton as Ellen March
- Rex Linn as Mercer
- Shawn Hatosy as Billy
- Ryan Hurst as Eddie March
- Charles Esten as Michael
- Ty O'Neal as Drew
- Jude Herrera as Carrier
- Tom Bower as Larry
- Mary Stuart Masterson as Hope, Postman's Daughter (uncredited)
- John Coinman as Troubadour (uncredited)

== Production ==
On his personal website, author David Brin reveals that while studios were bidding for The Postman, his wife decided during a screening of Field of Dreams that Kevin Costner should portray the title character. Brin agreed that the emotions evoked by Field of Dreams matched the message he intended to deliver with his novel. A decade later, after learning Costner would be cast as the lead, Brin said he was "thrilled". Costner discarded the old screenplay (in which the moral message of the novel had been reversed) and hired screenwriter Brian Helgeland; Brin says the two of them "rescued the 'soul' of the central character" and reverted the story's message to one of hope. Costner supposedly passed on the lead role in Air Force One to work on The Postman.

In an interview with Metro before filming began, Brin expressed his hope that The Postman would have the "pro-community feel" of Field of Dreams instead of the Mad Max feel of Costner's other post-apocalyptic film Waterworld. Brin said that, unlike typical post-apocalyptic movies that satisfy "little-boy wish fantasies about running amok in a world without rules", the intended moral of The Postman is that "if we lost our civilization, we'd all come to realize how much we missed it, and would realize what a miracle it is simply to get your mail every day."

The Postman was filmed in Metaline Falls and Fidalgo Island in Washington; central Oregon; and southern Arizona around Amado and Nogales. Metaline Falls is the location for the community of Pineview in the film.

Despite the film performing disastrously at two test screenings, Costner refused Warner Bros.' appeals that he edit it from its three-hour running time.

== Music ==
The Postman (Music from the Motion Picture)

Film score by James Newton Howard
- Released: December 23, 1997
- Length: 60:13
- Label: Warner Sunset/Warner Bros.

No.	Title	Writer(s)	Artist(s)	Length
1.	"Main Titles"	James Newton Howard		2:13
2.	"Shelter in the Storm"	James Newton Howard		6:23
3.	"The Belly of the Beast"	James Newton Howard		6:49
4.	"General Bethlehem"	James Newton Howard		6:55
5.	"Abby Comes Calling"	James Newton Howard		10:50
6.	"The Restored United States"	James Newton Howard		6:44
7.	"The Postman"	James Newton Howard		9:50
8.	"Almost Home"	Jono Manson	Jono Manson	3:59
9.	"It Will Happen Naturally"	Maria Machado and Jono Manson	Jono Manson	2:18
10.	"The Next Big Thing"	Jono Manson, Joe Flood and Jeffrey Barr	Jono Manson	2:19
11.	"This Perfect World"	John Coinman and Glenn Burke	John Coinman	3:38
12.	"Once This Was the Promise Land"	John Coinman	John Coinman	2:06
13.	"I Miss My Radio"	John Coinman and Blair Forward	John Coinman	2:42
14.	"Come and Get Your Love"	Lolly Vegas	John Coinman	3:07
15.	"You Didn't Have to Be So Nice"	John Sebastian and Steve Boone	Amy Grant and Kevin Costner	3:39
Total length:				60:13

== Reception ==
=== Box office ===
The film was a notorious failure at the box office. The first four days after opening brought in only $5.3 million on 2,207 screens in the United States and Canada. Produced on an estimated $80 million budget, it grossed $17 million in the United States and Canada and $30 million worldwide.

The film was subsequently released on VHS and DVD on June 9, 1998, and on Blu-ray on September 8, 2009.

=== Critical response ===
The Postman was panned by critics. On Rotten Tomatoes, the film has an approval rating of 14% based on 42 reviews, with an average rating of 4.2/10. The site's consensus states: "A massive miscalculation in self-mythologizing by director and star Kevin Costner, The Postman would make for a goofy good time if it weren't so fatally self-serious." Metacritic gives the film a score of 29 out of 100 based on 14 reviews, indicating "generally unfavorable" reviews. Audiences polled by CinemaScore gave the film an average grade of "B−" on an A+ to F scale.

In The New York Times, Stephen Holden criticized the movie for its "bogus sentimentality" and "mawkish jingoism". In the Chicago Sun-Times, Roger Ebert described The Postman as a failed yet well-meant effort at a parable, being "goofy", "pretentious", and "way too long", yet "good-hearted". He criticized Costner's putting himself in the lead role, arguing that such roles should be cast against type and that Costner had played too many similar roles in past films. On Siskel & Ebert, Ebert and Gene Siskel gave the film "two thumbs down", and Siskel sarcastically called it "Dances with Myself" (in reference to Costner's film Dances with Wolves) while referring to the bronze statue scene.

Costner defended the film:

I always thought it was a really good movie! I always thought I probably started it wrong. I should have said something like "once upon a time". Because it was just like a modern-day fairy tale—it wraps itself up with a storybook ending with the statue. You know, I thought it was a pretty funny movie set against the idea of a Superman—somebody stepping up. But in this case, it's a very humble guy who's nothing but a liar [laughs]—delivers mail and burns half of it just to stay alive. So, I like the movie.

In 2023, Rolling Stone cited The Postman as one of the fifty worst decisions in film history.

=== Accolades ===
Award	Date of ceremony	Category	Recipient(s)	Result	Ref.
Golden Reel Award	March 21, 1998	Outstanding Achievement in Sound Editing – Feature Underscore	The Postman	Nominated	
Saturn Awards	June 10, 1998	Best Science Fiction Film	The Postman	Nominated	
Saturn Awards	June 10, 1998	Best Supporting Actor	Will Patton	Nominated	
Saturn Awards	June 10, 1998	Best Actor	Kevin Costner	Nominated	
Razzie Award	March 22, 1998	Worst Actor	Kevin Costner	Won	
Razzie Award	March 22, 1998	Worst Director	Kevin Costner	Won	
Razzie Award	March 22, 1998	Worst Picture	Kevin Costner, Steve Tisch, and Jim Wilson	Won	
Razzie Award	March 22, 1998	Worst Screenplay	Eric Roth and Brian Helgeland, based on the book by David Brin	Won	
Razzie Award	March 22, 1998	Worst Original Song	The entire song selection	Won	
Razzie Award	March 25, 2000	Worst Picture of the Decade	The Postman	Nominated	
Stinkers Award	1998	Worst Picture	The Postman	Nominated	
Stinkers Award	1998	Worst Director	Kevin Costner	Nominated	

Awards
Preceded by Striptease	Golden Raspberry Award for Worst Picture; 18th Golden Raspberry Awards	Succeeded by An Alan Smithee Film: Burn Hollywood Burn
