= The Postman =

1985 novel by David Brin

- Cover of first edition (hardcover)
- Author: David Brin
- Language: English
- Genre: Post-apocalyptic dystopian
- Publisher: Bantam Books
- Publication date: 1985
- Publication place: United States
- Media type: Print (hardcover and paperback)
- Pages: 294
- Award: Locus Award for Best Science Fiction Novel (1986)
- ISBN: 0-553-05107-5
- OCLC: 12215763
- Dewey Decimal: 813/.54 19
- LC Class: PS3552.R4825 P6 1985

The Postman is a post-apocalyptic dystopian science fiction novel by David Brin. It is about a man wandering the desolate Oregon countryside who finds a United States Postal Service uniform, which he puts on and then claims he is a mail carrier and federal inspector for the "Restored United States of America". His mail service and claims about the return of a central government gives hope to the people, who are threatened by a murderous, neo-feudalist militia.

The first two parts were published separately as "The Postman" (1982) and "Cyclops" (1984). In 1997, a film adaptation of the novel was released starring Kevin Costner and Will Patton.

== Plot ==
Despite the post-apocalyptic scenario and several action sequences, the book is largely about civilization and its symbols. Each of the three sections deals with a different symbol.

The first is the Postman himself, Gordon Krantz, who takes the uniform solely for warmth after he loses almost everything to bandits. He wanders amongst small communities performing scenes from William Shakespeare plays in return for food and shelter. Originally a drama student at the University of Minnesota, he traveled west to Oregon in the aftermath of the worldwide chaos that resulted from several EMPs, the destruction of major cities, and the release of bioweapons. Taking shelter in a long-abandoned postal van, he finds a sack of mail and a postal uniform. He wears the uniform and takes the mail to a nearby community to barter for food and shelter. His initial claims to be a real postman start not because of a deliberate fraud (at least initially) but because people are desperate to believe in him and his claim that he represents the "Restored United States".

Later, in the second section, he encounters a community, Corvallis, Oregon, which is led by Cyclops, who is apparently a sentient artificial intelligence created at Oregon State University which survived the cataclysm. In reality, however, the machine ceased functioning due to damage from a Luddite mob, and a group of scientists maintain the pretense of its working to try to keep hope, order, and knowledge alive. The scientists also claim to use Cyclops' advice and predictions to solicit contributions of food from citizens, an approach that Gordon compares to the Delphi Oracle.

Eventually, in the third section, as the Postman joins forces with Cyclops's scientists in a war against an influx of "hypersurvivalist militia", the Postman begins to find that the hypersurvivalists are being pressed from Oregon's Rogue River area to the south as well. The hypersurvivalists are more commonly referred to as Holnists, after their founder, Nathan Holn, an author who championed a violent, misogynistic, and militaristic society. Holn was lynched sometime before the events in the novel, but in the time following what should have been a brief period of civil disorder, Holn's followers' attacks prevented the United States from recovering from the war and the plagues that followed.

As the story comes to a climax, the Postman allies with a tough tribal group made up of descendants of ranchers, loggers and Native Americans from Southwestern Oregon's Umpqua Valley region who are led by a Native American who is a former member of an airborne regiment of the U.S. military. The Umpqua people have developed a warrior culture similar to Native Americans of the Old West and are bitter enemies of the Holnists; they have defeated the Holnists at every turn, but until the Postman's arrival they were not inclined to help the "weak" townsfolk of the Willamette Valley against the Holnists. At the end of the novel, the Postman discovers the Holnists have another organized enemy to the South, identified only by the symbol they rally behind: the Bear Flag. The final scenes of the novel give the impression that the groups (symbols) may come together in an effort to revive civilization.

Another message of the plot deals with the backstory of the post-apocalyptic world, specifically, that it did not come about because of the EMPs, the bioweapons, or the numerous disasters, but the Holnists, who preyed on humanitarian workers and attacked communities during this difficult period.

== Reception ==
Dave Langford reviewed The Postman for White Dwarf #83, and stated that "The story is complicated by Krantz's intersection with another myth in the making, and then by a muddle of battle, murder and enhanced super-guerillas, all a bit of a needless distraction, but never mind. It's nicely written, sometimes moving, and ends as it should. Well worth reading."

Wendy Graham reviewed The Postman for Adventurer magazine and stated that "It is a tale which sets one thinking – who would be the leaders after the bomb drops or whatever? Would it be the bureaucrats and the military as they themselves think, or would it be someone as... ordinary... as a postman, simply because a postman can bring people into contact once again, and gains a certain respect from his job?"

Both of the initial parts were nominated for a Hugo Award for Best Novella. The completed novel won the John W. Campbell Memorial Award for Best Science Fiction Novel and the Locus Award for Best Science Fiction Novel, both for 1986. It was also nominated for the Hugo Award for Best Novel for 1986.

Brin has suggested that he wrote The Postman as a rebuke to the celebrations of mayhem in the many derivative post-apocalyptic fictions that appeared in the wake of the popular Mad Max movies.

== Film adaptation ==
The novel was adapted as a 1997 American adventure film produced and directed by Kevin Costner, who plays the lead role. It was written by Eric Roth and Brian Helgeland, and also features Will Patton, Larenz Tate, Olivia Williams, James Russo, and Tom Petty.

== Works with a similar theme ==
The novel Lucifer's Hammer by Larry Niven and Jerry Pournelle, and the game Fallout: New Vegas both feature the importance of postal service or couriers in a post-apocalypse scenario.
