= Excess Baggage (1997 film) =

- Theatrical release poster
- Directed by: Marco Brambilla
- Screenplay by: Max D. Adams; Dick Clement; Ian La Frenais
- Story by: Max D. Adams
- Produced by: Bill Borden; Carolyn Kessler
- Starring: Alicia Silverstone; Benicio del Toro; Christopher Walken; Jack Thompson; Nicholas Turturro; Harry Connick Jr.
- Cinematography: Jean-Yves Escoffier
- Edited by: Stephen Rivkin
- Music by: John Lurie
- Production companies: Columbia Pictures; First Kiss
- Distributed by: Sony Pictures Releasing
- Release date: August 29, 1997
- Running time: 98 minutes
- Country: United States
- Language: English
- Box office: $14.5 million

Excess Baggage is a 1997 American crime comedy film, written by Max D. Adams, Dick Clement, and Ian La Frenais, and directed by Marco Brambilla about a neglected young heiress who stages her own kidnapping to get her father's attention, only to be actually kidnapped by a car thief. The film stars Alicia Silverstone, Benicio del Toro, and Christopher Walken. Upon release, it was a critical and commercial failure.

== Plot ==
Emily Hope stages her own kidnapping to get the attention of her wealthy, corrupt father, Alexander. Using a gadget that disguises her voice, she instructs Alexander to drop $1 million onto a barge passing under the bridge where he is standing. Alexander does as he is told. Emily tells Alexander that his daughter can be found in the trunk of her BMW 850i, parked in a nearby garage.

Before calling the police to come "rescue" her, Emily tapes her ankles and mouth and hides in the trunk of her car. Police descend on the BMW, but before they can get to Emily, professional car thief Vincent Roche steals the vehicle, unaware that someone is in the trunk. As he exits the parking garage, the police pursue him, thinking he is Emily's kidnapper. Vincent manages to get away when the police crash into each other. The police also bungle the attempt to recover Alexander's money for him.

Alexander, who must be in Brussels to close a business deal in two days, arranges the help of Emily's "Uncle" Ray to find her and bring her home. Meanwhile, Vincent discovers the surprise "baggage" when he heads back to his warehouse hideout and opens the trunk. At the first sight of Emily, Vincent slams the trunk shut and resorts to contacting his partner in crime Greg for help on how to deal with his dilemma. Emily escapes from the trunk and finds her cell phone, learning her father has sent Ray after her.

When Vincent returns, Emily accidentally burns down his warehouse with a stray cigarette. The two are forced to go on the run together from Ray and his henchmen.

== Cast ==
- Alicia Silverstone as Emily Hope, a rich girl with a black belt in karate and a tendency for trouble. She had burned down her school library, perhaps to get the attention of her father when she was younger. Her relationship with her father is quite cold, but she has a solid friendship with her Uncle Ray and builds one with Vincent after he accidentally abducts her.
- Benicio del Toro as Vincent Roche, a successful and experienced car thief who supports himself with his work. He is referred to as "an innocent thief" who happens to steal the car with Emily in the trunk. After this his entire life is turned upside down as he gets implicated in several schemes and becomes dependent on his "hostage" to survive.
- Christopher Walken as Raymond "Uncle Ray" Perkins, Emily's uncle and cares for her well-being much more than her own father. He also suspects that this kidnapping situation is not a real kidnapping and might be one of Emily's "games" to get some much craved attention from her dad. His first encounters with Vincent are rather hostile, but the two eventually form a camaraderie.
- Jack Thompson as Alexander T. Hope, Emily's father and a very rich and successful businessman. He also pays little to no attention to his daughter, which often leads to her performing such outrageous stunts to get it as burning down her school library or staging her own kidnapping; these tend to backfire as the more effort she invests in trying to get him to pay attention to her, the less he sees fit to pay to her. It is hinted that his business deals may be corrupt.
- Harry Connick Jr. as Greg Kistler, Vincent's partner-in-crime, but it appears that Vincent does most of the work. They steal cars and sell them to people like Gus and Stick, which eventually lands them into trouble when their operation is burned down and Vincent is on the lam.
- Nicholas Turturro and Michael Bowen as Stick and Gus, two hoodlums who have had business transactions with Vincent and Greg but eventually turn on them.
- Leland Orser and Robert Wisden as Detectives Bernaby and Sims, two detectives who are investigating Emily's "kidnapping".
- Sally Kirkland as Louise Doucette, a bartender/waitress at a cafe near Vincent's home. Ray gets information about Vincent from her during his investigation of the kidnapping. She only appears in two scenes.

The film features cameo appearances by voice actor David Kaye and April Telek, both of whom are uncredited.

== Production ==
The script for Excess Baggage was the winner of the first annual Austin Film Festival Screenplay Competition where it was picked up by producer Barry Josephson when he was working at Sony Pictures.

This was the first film produced by Alicia Silverstone under her production company First Kiss. Benicio del Toro was handpicked for his role by Silverstone after she had seen his 1995 film The Usual Suspects.

Excess Baggage was filmed in Vancouver and Victoria, British Columbia.

== Reception ==
=== Box office ===
Excess Baggage debuted in theaters on Labor Day weekend of 1997, opening in the #6 spot. By the end of its run, it grossed $14.5 million domestically.

=== Critical response ===
Excess Baggage received mostly negative reviews from critics and holds a 32% rating on Rotten Tomatoes based on 31 reviews, with an average rating of 4.6/10. The site's critics consensus states: "Struggling to find a romantic spark in a seedy premise, Excess Baggage is weighed down by a lot of comedic dead weight." On Metacritic, the film holds a score of 34 out of 100, based on 16 critics, indicating "generally unfavorable" reviews. Audiences polled by CinemaScore gave the film an average grade of "B‒" on an A+ to F scale.

The Hartford Courant gave a positive review, commenting "What could have been a silly premise succeeds because of the chemistry between Silverstone and Del Toro, who won good notices for his work in 'The Usual Suspects'...Their exchanges are witty and sharply delivered." On the August 30, 1997 episode of Siskel & Ebert, Roger Ebert and Gene Siskel gave the film two thumbs up, with Siskel labeling it "much better" than Brambilla's previous 1993 film Demolition Man. In his other review for the Chicago Sun-Times, Roger Ebert stated that Silverstone was so "wonderful" and entertaining in Clueless that no followup could possibly satisfy audiences. Ebert mentioned Silverstone is "OK" in Excess Baggage, but "no better than OK" as he felt that she was miscast. James Berardinelli praised the cast but found the script "frustratingly ordinary and unambitious".

Del Toro was nominated for an ALMA Award for Outstanding Individual Performance in a Crossover Role in a Feature Film. Silverstone was nominated for a Razzie Award for Worst Actress where she lost to Demi Moore for G.I. Jane.

== Home media ==
Excess Baggage was released on VHS and DVD in February 1998 by Columbia TriStar Home Video. It was released on Blu-ray by Mill Creek Entertainment in June 2019, as part of their "I Love the 90s" line. Reviews of the Blu-ray release described the picture and sound quality as "heavily processed" and "a mess".
