= Double Team (film) =

1997 film by Tsui Hark

- Theatrical release poster
- Directed by: Tsui Hark
- Screenplay by: Don Jakoby; Paul Mones
- Story by: Don Jakoby
- Produced by: Moshe Diamant
- Starring: Jean-Claude Van Damme; Dennis Rodman; Mickey Rourke
- Cinematography: Peter Pau
- Edited by: Bill Pankow
- Music by: Gary Chang
- Production company: Mandalay Pictures; One Story Pictures
- Distributed by: Sony Pictures Releasing
- Release dates: January 31, 1997 (Romania); April 4, 1997 (U.S.)
- Running time: 93 minutes
- Country: United States
- Language: English
- Budget: $30 million
- Box office: $48.1 million

Double Team is a 1997 American buddy action film directed by Hong Kong filmmaker Tsui Hark, from a screenplay by Don Jakoby and Paul Mones. It stars Jean-Claude Van Damme and Dennis Rodman, respectively, as a counterterrorism agent and a flamboyant arms dealer, who team up to taken down an elusive terrorist (played by Mickey Rourke).

Hark's American and English-language directorial debut, Double Team was released in the United States by Sony Pictures Releasing on April 4, 1997. It received generally negative reviews, but was a moderate commercial success.

== Plot ==
After retrieving a truck load of plutonium stolen from a US military base in Croatia by freelance international terrorist Stavros, CIA counterterrorism agent Jack Quinn retires to Southern France with Kathryn, his pregnant wife. His former boss tells him that Stavros, his old nemesis, has become active again and convinces him to come out of retirement.

Quinn travels to Antwerp, where quirky arms dealer Yaz outfits him. Quinn and his team track Stavros to an amusement park, but Quinn hesitates to shoot Stavros when he sees Stavros is meeting with his six-year-old son. Stavros exploits Quinn's hesitation and a shootout ensues. Stavros' son is killed. Stavros flees into a hospital, pursued by Quinn. Stavros and Quinn fight in the maternity ward, and Quinn is knocked unconscious by an explosion.

Due to his hesitation, Quinn is declared killed in action and placed in 'The Colony', an invisible penal island for secret agents. The occupants of the Colony are expected to analyze terrorist threats and register themselves every day using a fingerprint scanner. While analyzing information from a terrorist bombing, Quinn picks up a message from Stavros telling him that Stavros has kidnapped Kathryn. Quinn slices off the skin of his fingertip and puts it into an automated device to fool the fingerprint scanner, then escapes the energy field surrounding the island by attaching himself to cargo due to be extracted from the air. Another agent on the Colony, Goldsmythe, is activated as Quinn's "guardian", responsible for tracking him down.

Quinn enlists Yaz's assistance by promising access to CIA bank accounts. The two go to Quinn's house, where they are ambushed by Stavros' men. After fighting the men off, Quinn receives a message from Stavros telling him that he must go to Rome for his baby's sake. When they arrive in Rome, Quinn admits to Yaz that the bank accounts are empty, and he has nothing to offer for Yaz's services, but a promise to repay him. However, Yaz volunteers his help after he learns that Quinn's wife is pregnant from a sonogram delivered to the given rendezvous. Quinn emails Stavros encouraging him to meet in a town square.

At the meeting point, Quinn catches sight of Kathryn in a car but is intercepted by Stavros and a shootout occurs as Kathryn is driven away. Quinn tracks Stavros' sniper to the hotel suite where Kathryn was being held and finds a clue to her whereabouts: a prescription bottle label. With the help of an order of monks Yaz has equipped with computers and Internet access, Quinn reaches the hospital. He finds Kathryn has given birth and Stavros has taken his son. Quinn locates Stavros and the baby in a Roman amphitheater. Stavros leaves Quinn in the middle of a minefield with his son and a tiger.

Yaz arrives on a motorbike and snatches the baby, leaving Quinn to escape from the tiger and go after Stavros. While Quinn and Stavros fight in the minefield, Yaz moves the markers, leading Stavros to step on a mine, unable to move without setting it off. Goldsmythe, who has tracked Quinn, finds the baby; Quinn, his son, Goldsmythe and Yaz run as Stavros is charged by the tiger and takes his foot off the mine. They take shelter from the explosion behind a vending machine. Goldsmythe asks Quinn for his hair and shirt as proof that he successfully tracked him; Yaz drops a smoke bomb, allowing Quinn to escape.

== Cast ==
- Jean-Claude Van Damme as Jack Paul Quinn, a government counter-terrorist agent, forced out of retirement by the kidnapping of his pregnant wife, Kathryn, by Stavros.
- Dennis Rodman as Yaz, an eccentric arms dealer based in Antwerp. He boasts that he stocks military hardware so new that even he does not know he has it. Yaz initially agrees to help Quinn defeat Stavros after being offered access to CIA bank accounts but commits himself freely after discovering Kathryn is pregnant.
- Paul Freeman as Alex Goldsmythe, a friend with whom Jack Quinn is reunited after arriving at the Colony and who Jack had previously thought dead. Alex is Jack's 'guardian'. Jack's welfare and performance is Alex's responsibility and Alex is involved with tracking Jack once he escapes the island.
- Mickey Rourke as Stavros, an international terrorist. Stavros works freelance for any government willing to offer him sufficient financial incentive. At the start of the film, he is implicated in the theft of plutonium from a United States military base with the suggestion being that he intended to sell it to Iraq. He undertakes a personal vendetta against Quinn, blaming Quinn for the death of his son.
- Natacha Lindinger as Kathryn Quinn, Jack's wife and a sculptor by trade. Kathryn and her then unborn son are kidnapped by Stavros.
- Valeria Cavalli as Dr. Maria Trifioli, a doctor who helped Kathryn gave birth under duress from Stavros and tries to protect her.

The cast also features Jay Benedict as CIA deputy director Brandon, Rob Kaman as Quinn's old rival and Colony resident Dieter Staal, Paolo Paoloni as the old monk, Ted Rusoff as Brother Ramolo, Umberto Raho as Brother Regulo, and Hung Yan-yan as Stavros' hotel henchman.

== Production ==
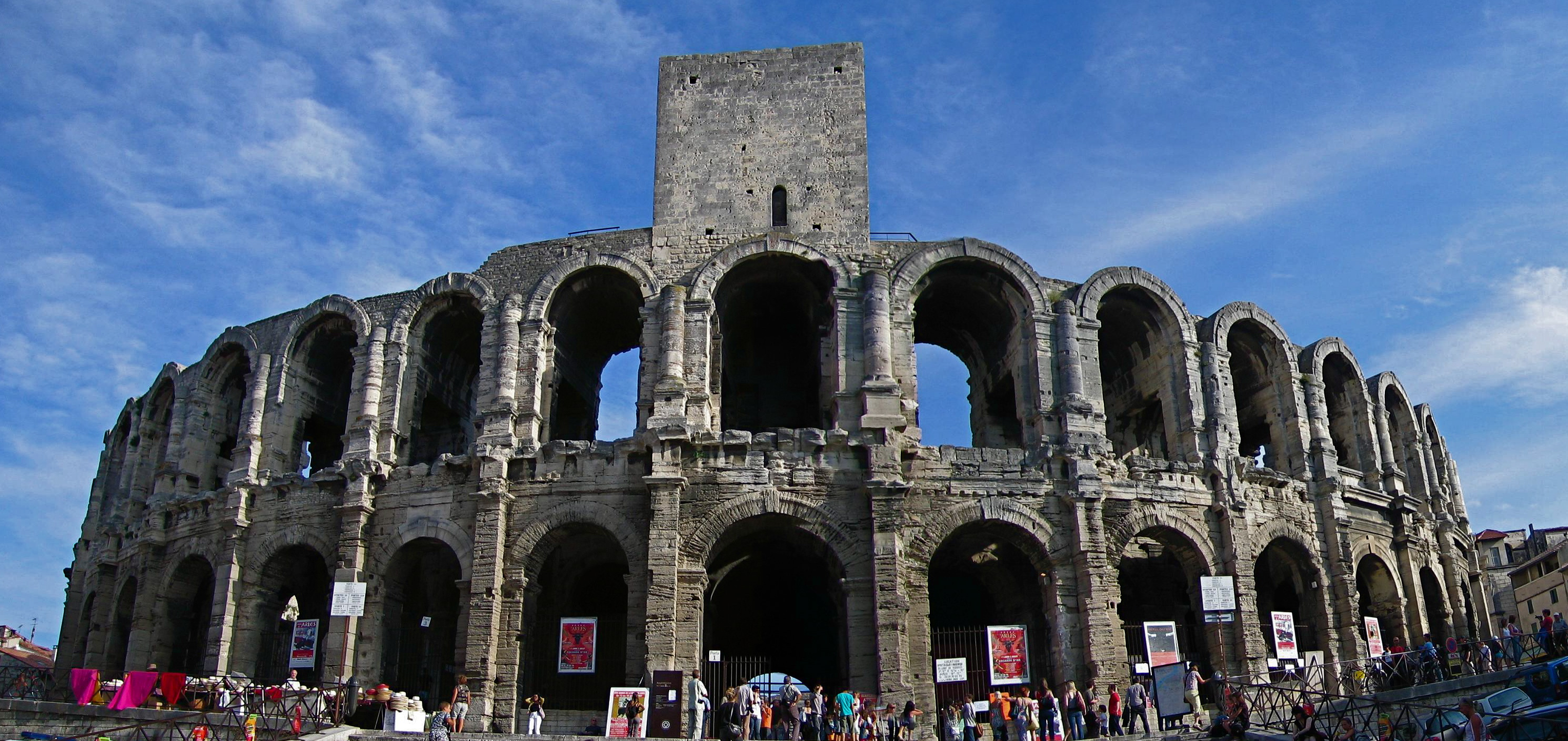
The Arles Amphitheater in 2010.

Double Team was filmed on location in Rome, Italy; Nice and Arles, France. The climatic sequence in the Colosseum was actually filmed at the Arles Amphitheater, due to restrictions on shooting in the former location. Tsui Hark's regular collaborators Sammo Hung and Hung Yan-yan contributed to the film's action choreography.

The working title of the film was The Colony.

== Release ==
The film premiered in Romania on January 31, 1997. It was released in the United States by Sony Pictures Releasing on April 4.

=== Home media ===
The film has been released on Blu-ray by Mill Creek Entertainment in the United States, and by 88 Films in the United Kingdom.

== Reception ==
=== Critical reception ===
On the review aggregator website Rotten Tomatoes, 10% of 20 critics' reviews are positive. Metacritic, which uses a weighted average, assigned the film a score of 44 out of 100, based on 22 critics, indicating "mixed or average" reviews. Rodman's contribution as Yaz attracted particular criticism with attention being brought to the character's esoteric fashion sense, one reviewer pointing out that "his hair covers all known hues of the spectrum." In addition, the film's plot and production was attacked by several reviewers for being unimaginative and impassive. The New York Times wrote that Double Team's "sets are impersonal. Actors sleepwalk. Scenes do not end, they just stop."

Criticism was not, however, universally negative. The Los Angeles Times referred to Double Team as "one of Van Damme's best" and continued to praise both Rodman's and Rourke's performances. In addition, the film was awarded four stars out of five by boxoffice.com in a retrospective review written in 2008.

Audiences polled by CinemaScore gave the film an average grade of "B−" on an A+ to F scale.

=== Awards and nominations ===
Award	Year	Category	Nominee	Result
Razzie Award	1998	Worst New Star	Dennis Rodman	Won
Razzie Award	1998	Worst Supporting Actor	Dennis Rodman	Won
Razzie Award	1998	Worst New Star of the Decade	Dennis Rodman	Nominated
Razzie Award	1998	Worst Screen Couple	Dennis Rodman	Won
Razzie Award	1998	Worst Screen Couple	Jean-Claude Van Damme	Won
Stinkers Bad Movie Awards	1997	Worst On-Screen Couple	Jean-Claude Van Damme, Dennis Rodman	Won
