= McHale's Navy (1997 film) =

1997 film by Bryan Spicer

- Theatrical release poster
- Directed by: Bryan Spicer
- Written by: Peter Crabbe; Andy Rose
- Produced by: Bill Sheinberg; Jon Sheinberg; Sid Sheinberg
- Starring: Tom Arnold; David Alan Grier; Dean Stockwell; Debra Messing; Tim Curry; Ernest Borgnine
- Cinematography: Buzz Feitshans IV
- Edited by: Russell Denove
- Music by: Dennis McCarthy
- Production company: The Bubble Factory
- Distributed by: Universal Pictures
- Release date: April 18, 1997
- Running time: 108 minutes
- Country: United States
- Language: English
- Budget: $42 million
- Box office: $4.5 million

McHale's Navy is a 1997 American military comedy film directed by Bryan Spicer, and starring Tom Arnold, David Alan Grier, Dean Stockwell, Debra Messing and Tim Curry. The screenplay by Peter Crabbe and Andy Rose is based on the 1962–1966 television series of the same title. Ernest Borgnine was the only member of the series' cast to appear in the film.

McHale's Navy was theatrically released on April 18, 1997, by Universal Pictures, to critical and commercial failure, grossing $4.5 million against a $42 million budget.

== Plot ==
On the island of San Moreno, a trio of important-looking men (a Chinese militant, a Russian General, and a European businessman) are meeting with the island's governor. After paying him a suitcase full of money for a special operation, the trio is joined, via helicopter, by Major Jake McPherson Vladakov, the second best terrorist in the world, who will oversee the operation. This entire event is witnessed by Roberto, a young boy who takes pictures of the governor, the Major, and his men.

The next morning, retired Lt. Commander Quinton McHale does some trading with the officers at the Naval Base of San Ysidro. Such goods and services include selling home-brewed beer, ice cream, and swimsuit calendars to the men in exchange for things like medicine and satellite photos to help the people of San Moreno. The photos are his way of spying on the opposing children's baseball team. Stationed at the base are his old crew: Virgil, a gunner; Happy, the team lookout; Willie, the team techie; Gruber, a card-player and cigar hoarder; and Christy, the group's musclehead.

However, Captain Wallace B. Binghamton and Lieutenant Penelope Carpenter command the base now. Capt. Binghamton believes his men have gone native and confiscates all the products McHale has sold them. He wants to resurrect his career after having mistakenly sunk a luxury cruise liner, for which he is famously known.

Vladakov takes control of the baseball field and beach on San Moreno to set up his base of operations. After Roberto inadvertently alerts Vladakov to McHale's presence, (mostly thanks to the jersey that McHale gave him and the team), Vladakov uses his new stealth boat to blow up McHale's home and nearly destroys his PT-73, a decommissioned PT Boat, which reveals that they have a bad history with each other. When the governor tells Vladakov that his operations are disrupting the lives of the villagers, Vladakov and his men invade the village during their fiesta, blowing it up, and displacing everyone that lived there.

At the Pentagon, admiral Cobra learns about Vladakov's presence on San Moreno and instructs Binghamton to stand down in favor of McHale, revealing that he was once a highly decorated, top covert operative. This shocks Binghamton, but he relays the message to McHale. McHale rejects the mission, saying he wants nothing to do with it, or with Binghamton. Upon learning that the village was destroyed, McHale accepts the assignment with the stipulations that he be given his old crew, men stationed at San Ysidro, and complete autonomy from Binghamton. Binghamton appears to agree but enlists Ensign Charles Parker to spy on McHale.

McHale sets up a camp site for the villagers and, after invading Vladakov's base to learn what is going on, heads to Cuba for supplies to fix the re-commissioned PT-73 and to combat Vladakov. McHale and his crew use a pirated variety show broadcast to prevent Vladakov from stealing missile launch codes and entertain the villagers. Binghamton, tired of sitting on the side lines, attempts an attack on Vladakov's base but upon arrival, it is vacated and shown to be a front. Vladakov has killed the men that hired him to blow up The Pentagon as his motives are revealed. He was monitoring communications between McHale and Cobra and knows that Cobra is en route to San Moreno to help take out Vladakov.

Vladakov attempts to kill Cobra using his stealth boat. Roberto is aboard and tries to short out the boat, to no avail. He is captured by Vladakov, but manages to jump ship. After Ensign Parker saves Roberto, McHale kills Vladakov using a torpedo he bought in Cuba, as revenge for Vladakov killing Roberto's father in Panama. Cobra lands safely and reveals that he is McHale's father, none other than now Admiral Quinton McHale Sr. and former WWII era commander of the PT-73.

McHale's crew is commended, Carpenter and Parker are promoted, the US Navy rebuild the baseball field, and McHale re-retires so that he may pursue a relationship with Carpenter. Binghamton is demoted to umpire for a kids' baseball game.

== Cast ==
- Tom Arnold as Lt. Commander Quinton McHale Jr.
- Dean Stockwell as Captain Wallace B. Binghamton
- Debra Messing as Lt. (later Lt. Commander) Penelope Carpenter
- Ernest Borgnine as Rear Admiral (upper half) Quinton McHale Sr.
- David Alan Grier as Ensign (later Lt. JG) Charles T. Parker
- Tim Curry as Major Vladakov
- Bruce Campbell as Petty Officer 1st Class Virgil (Ladies man, pointman/gunner)
- French Stewart as Seaman Happy (Lives in a treehouse, lookout)
- Brian Haley as Seaman Apprentice Christy (Muscle of the crew)
- Danton Stone as Petty Officer 2nd Class Gruber (Smokes cigars and plays poker)
- Henry Cho as Petty Officer 3rd Class Willie (technical expert)
- Tommy Chong as Armando / Ernesto

== Production ==
In September 1995, it was reported that a feature film adaptation of McHale's Navy was in development with The Bubble Factory for Universal Pictures. The United States Navy declined to participate in the film's production with executive producer Lance Hool stating their rejection was on the basis of the film not being a "Top Gun recruitment picture". As a result, the production took place in Mexico where the film instead received cooperation with the Mexican Navy but had to build salvaged PT boats from the ground up.

Initially Tom Arnold had been set to play Ralph Kramden in a film version The Honeymooners for Savoy Pictures, but after receiving a $4 million offer to star in McHale's Navy he abandoned The Honeymooners in order to sign on.

== Reception ==
=== Box office ===
The film earned $2,128,565, ranking 7th place at the box office in its opening weekend. Its final total came to $4,529,843, against a production budget of $42 million.

Sidney Sheinberg, whose production company The Bubble Factory produced the film for Universal, said: "McHale’s Navy was a disaster. I'm not pretending it wasn’t a disaster".

=== Critical response ===
On the review aggregator website Rotten Tomatoes, 3% of 30 critics' reviews are positive, with an average rating of 2.8/10. The website's consensus reads: "About as funny as a keelhauling, McHale's Navy will leave most viewers feeling they've been the victim of a particularly dishonorable discharge." Metacritic, which uses a weighted average, assigned the film a score of 18 out of 100, based on 10 critics, indicating "overwhelming dislike". Audiences surveyed by CinemaScore gave the film an average grade of "C+" on scale of A to F.

Mick LaSalle of the San Francisco Chronicle wrote in a very negative review: "By the end, this soporific comedy makes 105 minutes feel more like a two-year hitch." Leonard Klady of Variety wrote: "Time and adapters have not been kind to the fun-loving series."

=== Awards ===
McHale's Navy was nominated for a Razzie Award for Worst Remake or Sequel, losing to Speed 2: Cruise Control. It won the awards for Worst Actor (Arnold) and Worst Resurrection of a TV Show at the 1997 Stinkers Bad Movie Awards.
