= Sidney Sheinberg =

American lawyer and entertainment executive (1935–2019)

- Born: Sidney Jay Sheinberg; January 14, 1935; Corpus Christi, Texas, U.S.
- Died: March 7, 2019 (aged 84); Beverly Hills, California, U.S.
- Other name: Sid Sheinberg
- Education: Columbia University (B.A., J.D)
- Occupations: Hollywood studio head, Lawyer President of Universal Pictures (1982)
- Years active: 1958–2019
- Employer(s): MCA Inc. Universal Pictures; Revue Productions
- Known for: Discovering Steven Spielberg; Responsible for: Jaws; E.T. the Extra-Terrestrial; Jurassic Park; Schindler's List
- Board member of: See Boards and Honors
- Spouse: Lorraine Gary (m. 1956)
- Children: 2
- Awards: See "Boards and Honors"

Sidney Jay Sheinberg (January 14, 1935 – March 7, 2019) was an American businessman, lawyer and entertainment executive. He served as president and CEO of MCA Inc. and Universal Pictures for over 40 years.

== Early life and education ==
Sheinberg, the son of Jewish immigrants, a Ukrainian mother, Tillie (Grossman), and a Polish father, Harry Sheinberg, grew up in Corpus Christi, Texas where he was born on January 14, 1935. In 1955, Sheinberg graduated from Columbia University and subsequently attended Columbia Law School, as both a Harlan Fiske Stone and James Kent Scholar, where he obtained his JD. Sheinberg was a recipient of Columbia Law School's highest honors awarded to alumni: the Medal of Excellence and the John Jay Award.

== Career ==
In the summer of 1958, Sheinberg arrived in California, where he accepted a teaching position at UCLA School of Law. In 1959 while awaiting the results of his California Bar Examination, he joined the legal department of Revue Productions, the former television subsidiary of MCA Inc., and the predecessor of Universal Television, and began his career in the entertainment industry. In 1962, Sheinberg was involved in MCA's acquisition of Universal.

Sheinberg is credited with discovering director Steven Spielberg. In the late 1960s, Sheinberg had seen Spielberg's first short film, Amblin, and signed the director, then 20, to a 7-year contract to the MCA/Universal Television in 1968. As recounted by Spielberg on numerous occasions, Sheinberg told him, "a lot of people will stick with you in success; I'll stick with you in failure."

In 1971, Sheinberg became president of Universal Television.

In June 1973, Sheinberg was elected president and chief operating officer of MCA, Inc. and Universal Pictures, serving alongside Lew Wasserman. Having the benefit of being guided by Lew Wasserman, Sheinberg acknowledged that an essential part of being a mentor is having confidence in the people you're guiding and mentoring. Together they transformed Universal from a second-string studio, dependent on its television productions, into a major player: by July 1995, when Wasserman stepped down as chairman and Sheinberg formed an independent entertainment company, they "had turned MCA into a nearly $5 billion entertainment conglomerate."

Under Sheinberg's leadership, Universal released what were, at the time of each of their releases, the highest-grossing films of each of the last three decades of the twentieth century. All three films were Universal/Spielberg projects, beginning with 1975's Jaws, 1982's E.T. the Extra-Terrestrial and concluding with 1993's Jurassic Park.

During pre-production, Jaws was always on 'thin ice.' Sheinberg attached Spielberg to the project and despite many headwinds, pushed for the picture to be released. He hired his wife to appear in the film. When 1975's Jaws ran over budget, Sheinberg had Spielberg's back—what skeptics dismissed as an overpriced B-movie became a horror classic that defined the new summer-blockbuster genre. (The $471 million it collected worldwide would be more than $1.9 billion today.)

Other high-performing films credited to him are Schindler's List (1993) and Back to the Future (1985). Sheinberg wanted to change the name from "Back to the Future" to "Space Man From Pluto" despite the film having nothing to do with outer space, spacemen, or the dwarf planet Pluto.

In 1982, Thomas Keneally published his historical novel Schindler's Ark, which he wrote after a chance meeting with Leopold Pfefferberg in Los Angeles in 1980. Sheinberg sent director Spielberg a copy of the book along with a New York Times review. Sheinberg greenlit the film on condition that Spielberg made Jurassic Park first. Spielberg later said, "He knew that once I had directed Schindler I wouldn't be able to do Jurassic Park." The picture was assigned a small budget of $22 million, as Holocaust films are not usually profitable. Spielberg donated his salary and all residuals to his Shoah Foundation, saying that to profit personally from the film would be tantamount to blood money. The director had little hope for the profitability of the film and believed it would flop. The film was a box office success, bringing in over $320 million and is considered a historic motion picture that poignantly captured the Holocaust.

Sheinberg saw significant opportunity in the music industry and led MCA Music Entertainment's (later renamed Universal Music Group) acquisition of Motown in 1988 for $61 million and Geffen Records in 1990 for $550 million. He led MCA's expansion into music, and under Sheinberg's leadership, the music division grew significantly, becoming a major industry force alongside its film and television businesses. Through his development of the music division and strategic acquisitions, he spearheaded the rise of what is now Universal Music Group (UMG).

In 1982, Sheinberg was quoted saying, "You'd better start saving money to pay your attorney's fees, I view litigation as a profit center" during a meeting to get Nintendo to pay Universal royalties for Nintendo's Donkey Kong franchise. Later when Universal sued Nintendo, this quote was brought up in court. Nintendo was found non-infringing, and it was also revealed that Universal knew King Kong was in the public domain all along. (See also Universal City Studios, Inc. v. Nintendo Co., Ltd.)

In 1984, as part of MCA's potential acquisition of The Walt Disney Company, Sheinberg agreed to vacate his role as MCA President in order to allow Disney CEO Ron W. Miller to assume the role. Despite coming close to actually happening, however, Wasserman strongly disagreed and said that Sheinberg should stay as MCA President, causing the deal to collapse entirely.

His battle with Terry Gilliam over the final cut of the movie Brazil was the subject of a book and documentary entitled The Battle of Brazil.

In 1990, Sheinberg and Lew Wasserman negotiated a $6.59 billion sale of MCA and Universal to Japan's Matsushita Electric in cash and securities.

Sheinberg departed Universal in July 1995, following the takeover of the studio by the Seagram Company. He produced several feature films through his production company The Bubble Factory over the decade that followed.

== Boards and honors ==
Sheinberg served on the National Board of the National Conference of Christians and Jews. He was also a member of the Board of Trustees of Pitzer College (one of the Claremont group of colleges), the Board of The American Jewish Committee, the Board of Research To Prevent Blindness and the Board of Trustees of the Simon Wiesenthal Center. He was the vice chairman of Human Rights Watch and the co-founder of the Children's Action Network. He was honored by the National Gay and Lesbian Task Force for his life's work in civil rights and inclusive support of the LGBT community.

He received Columbia College's John Jay Award in 1981 for distinguished professional achievement, the American Jewish Committee's Human Relations Award in 1982, the National Conference of Christians and Jews Humanitarian Award in 1983, and Pioneer Of The Year Award in 1984 from the Motion Picture Pioneers, as well as the rank of Chevalier of the Ordre des Arts et des Lettres in 1984 bestowed by the French government.

In 1987, he received the DeWitt Carter Reddick Award at the University of Texas in Austin, and in 1989 he was named a Lifetime Honorary Member of the Directors Guild of America for his decades of service on the DGA-AMPTP Creative Rights Committee. He received the AIDS Project Los Angeles Commitment to Life Award in 1991, the Medal of Honor from the American Academy of Achievement in 1994 and the GLAAD Media Award in 1996.

Sheinberg and his wife jointly received the 1995 Simon Wiesenthal Center's Humanitarian Award. In 2008, he received the Mike Farrell Human Rights Award from Death Penalty Focus.

Sheinberg Place (a street on the Universal Studios lot in Los Angeles), was dedicated in his honor February 4, 2008, at a ceremony honoring the former studio chief. David Geffen, Jeffrey Katzenberg and Steven Spielberg were among those attending.

== Personal life ==
Sheinberg married actress Lorraine Gary in 1956. Together, they had two sons, William and Jonathan, with whom he co-founded The Bubble Factory in 1995.

== Death ==
Sidney Sheinberg died in Beverly Hills, California, on March 7, 2019, at the age of 84 from Parkinson's disease.
