= 1979 in aviation =

This is a list of aviation-related events from 1979.

== Events ==
- Eight Bell 212s delivered to the Civil Aviation Administration of China are the first helicopters supplied to the People's Republic of China by an American manufacturer.

=== January ===
- Continental Airlines inaugurates service between Houston, Texas, and Washington, D.C.
- January 1 – Trans World Airlines becomes a subsidiary of Trans World Corporation.
- January 12
  - Pilatus Aircraft acquires Britten-Norman.
  - Three hijackers commandeer a Tunis Air Boeing 727-2H3 making a domestic flight in Tunisia from Tunis to Djerba, demanding the release of prisoners. The airliner diverts to Tripoli, Libya, where the hijackers surrender.
  - Braniff International Airways becomes the only American airline to operate the Concorde as two Braniff pilots land an Air France and a British Airways Concorde simultaneously on parallel runways at Dallas-Fort Worth Regional Airport after flying from Washington Dulles International Airport in Virginia outside Washington, D.C., ceremonially inaugurating a new interchange service allowing the Concorde to operate over the United States. The service functions by having Air France and British Airways crews fly the aircraft from Europe to Washington Dulles, where the aircraft are temporarily leased and re-registered to Braniff and flown by Braniff crews as Braniff aircraft to Dallas-Fort Worth. The process is reversed on the return trip, with Braniff crews flying the planes as Braniff aircraft to Washington Dulles, where they are "sold" back and re-registered to Air France and British Airways before being flown back to Europe by French and British crews. Braniff begins revenue service with the Concorde between Dallas-Fort Worth and Washington Dulles on January 13, charging 10 percent more than it charges for first class on its Boeing 727s flying the route.
- January 15 – After its pilot turns off its de-icing system too soon on approach to Minsk-1 Airport in Minsk in the Soviet Union's Byelorussian Soviet Socialist Republic, an Aeroflot Antonov An-24B (registration CCCP-46807) loses longitudinal stability due to icing and crashes 5.3 kilometers (3.3 miles) from the airport, killing 13 of the 14 people on board.
- January 16 – Six hijackers aboard a Middle East Airlines Boeing 707 bound from Beirut, Lebanon, to Amman, Jordan, demand the release of prisoners. The hijackers surrender at Beirut International Airport.
- January 24 – An Air Algerie Nord 262A-44 (registration 7T-VSU) on approach to Boudghene Ben Ali Lotfi Airport in Béchar, Algeria, flies too low and crashes 15 kilometers (9.3 miles) from the airport, killing 14 of the 23 people on board.
- January 27 – A 49-year-old California woman hijacks United Airlines Flight 8 – a Boeing 747 with 131 people on board, including actor Sam Jaffe – as it flies from Los Angeles, California, to New York City. She threatens to blow up the plane if an actor – she demands that it be either Charlton Heston, Jack Lemmon, or Lindsay Wagner – does not read her message on U.S. national television from Los Angeles International Airport, where Heston stands by in case he is needed. About two hours after the airliner lands at John F. Kennedy International Airport in New York, she releases about 25 passengers. Police finally overpower and arrest her about 11 hours after the incident began.
- January 30 – Varig Boeing 707-320C PP-VLU, a cargo plane, disappears over the Pacific Ocean 30 minutes after departing Tokyo's Narita International Airport. Its wreck was never found. Lost along with the six people on board are 53 paintings by Manabu Mabe. The captain had been the pilot of Varig Flight 820, which had crashed in France in 1973.

=== February ===
- McDonnell Douglas completes the last A-4 Skyhawk. In the 25 years since the first prototype flew in 1954, the Douglas Aircraft Company and McDonnell Douglas have built 2,960 Skyhawks.
- February 8 – A TAM Airlines Embraer EMB-110C Bandeirante (registration PT-SBB) strikes trees during its initial climb after takeoff from Bauru Airport in Bauru, Brazil, and crashes into flames, killing all 18 people on board.
- February 12 – Members of the Zimbabwe People's Revolutionary Army (ZIPRA) shoot down Air Rhodesia Flight 827, the Vickers Viscount Umniati, with a Strela 2 (NATO reporting name "SA-7 Grail") surface-to-air missile in the Vuti African Purchase Area of Rhodesia east of Lake Kariba, killing all 59 people on board.
- February 18 – Flying from Coast Guard Air Station Cape Cod in Sandwich, Massachusetts, in bad weather to rescue a crewman in distress aboard the Japanese fishing vessel Kasei Maru #18, the United States Coast Guard Sikorsky HH-3F Pelican helicopter CG-1432 loses power and ditches in heavy seas in the North Atlantic Ocean 180 nautical miles (207 mi (333 km) southeast of Nantucket, Massachusetts. One Canadian Armed Forces and three U.S. Coast Guard personnel aboard die; Kasei Maru No. 18 rescues one U.S. Coast Guard crewman and recovers the bodies of the other four men.
- February 19 – American former child actor Norman Ollestad Sr. dies instantly when the chartered Cessna 172 he is riding in crashes in California's San Bernardino Mountains in adverse weather at an altitude of 7,300 feet (2,200 meters). The pilot dies soon afterwards. The two survivors, Ollestad's girlfriend and his 11-year-old son, future author Norman Ollestad Jr., attempt to descend the mountain. She dies in a fall, but the younger Ollestad survives.
- February 26 – Production of the A-4 Skyhawk ends after 26 years, with the delivery of the 2,690th and final aircraft to the United States Marine Corps.
- February 27 – Four hijackers commandeer Aeroflot Flight 212 – a Tupolev Tu-154 with 34 people on board – shortly after it takes off from Oslo, Norway, for a flight to Stockholm, Sweden. They threaten to blow up the airliner with glass bottles filled with kerosene. The plane lands at Stockholm, where the crew overpowers the hijackers.
- February 28 – Since January 1, Tanzania has shot down 19 Ugandan aircraft during the Uganda-Tanzania War. The losses drive the Ugandan Air Force out of the war.

=== March ===
- March 10 – The United States Air Force sends Boeing E-3 Sentry airborne warning and control system (AWACS) aircraft to monitor the civil war in Yemen.
- March 14
  - A CAAC Hawker Siddeley HS-121 Trident 2E (registration B-274) on a training flight crashes into a factory in Beijing, China, during its initial climb after takeoff from Beijing Xijiao Airport, killing all 12 people on the plane and at least 32 people on the ground, although some sources estimate that up to 200 people are killed.
  - After two missed approaches at Doha International Airport in Doha, Qatar, Alia Royal Jordanian Flight 600, the Boeing 727-2D3 City of Petra (registration JY-ADU), attempts to divert to Dhahran International Airport in Dhahran, Saudi Arabia. While climbing away from Doha International, the airliner stalls at an altitude of 750 feet (230 meters) and crashes, striking the ground at a speed of 170 knots (195 mph (314 km/h). It breaks into three pieces, killing 45 of the 64 people on board.
- March 16 – A man hijacks Continental Airlines Flight 62 – a Boeing 727 with 95 people on board flying from Phoenix to Tucson, Arizona – demanding a ransom of US$200,000 and transportation to Cuba. The airliner lands at Tucson, where he is arrested about two hours later.
- March 17 – After receiving a false warning of a fire in its No. 1 engine shortly after takeoff from Vnukovo Airport in Moscow, an overloaded Aeroflot Tupolev Tu-104B (registration CCCP-42444) flown by an inexperienced pilot attempts to return to the airport. On approach, the airliner strikes a power line transmission tower, bounces off a hill, passes over a highway, and crashes in a frozen ploughed field, its wings and cockpit separating from its fuselage. The crash kills 58 of the 119 people on board.
- March 25 – Qantas retires its last Boeing 707 and becomes the world's first airline with a fleet made up exclusively of Boeing 747s.
- March 26 – An Interflug Ilyushin Il-18D cargo plane (registration DM-STL) attempts to abort its takeoff from Quatro de Fevereiro Airport in Luanda, Angola, after its No. 2 engine fails. The plane strikes the instrument landing system localizer antenna, breaks up, and burns, killing all 10 people on board.
- March 29 – Quebecair Flight 255, a Fairchild F-27, suffers an engine explosion minutes after takeoff from Québec City Jean Lesage International Airport in Quebec City, Quebec, Canada. While attempting to return to the airport, the airliner crashes into a hillside, killing 17 of the 24 people on board.
- March 31 – 550 senior officers of the Iranian armed forces, many of them Iranian Air Force and Iranian Army generals, have been killed or driven out of military service since the Iranian Revolution deposed the Shah of Iran on 11 February.

=== April ===
- Retired Formula One world motor racing champion Niki Lauda founds Lauda Air. The airline will begin flight operations in 1985.
- April 4
  - A man takes a woman hostage at knifepoint at a security screening point at Sydney Airport in Sydney, Australia, and takes her with him as he forces his away aboard Pan American World Airways Flight 816, a Boeing 747SP-21 (registration N530PA) preparing for a flight to Auckland, New Zealand. He demands to be flown via Singapore to Rome – where he wishes to speak to the Pope and to an Italian Communist leader – and then on to Moscow. Police forcefully rescue the hostage, after which the hijacker produces two beer cans with wicks in them, one of which he holds in one hand; holding one of them in one hand and a match in the other hand, he threatens to blow up the plane. The police use a high-pressure fire hose to knock him off balance and when he ducks behind a seat with one of the beer cans, they shoot him. He later dies of his wounds. The beer cans are found to contain gunpowder.
  - Trans World Airlines Flight 841, a Boeing 727-31 with 89 people on board on a flight from John F. Kennedy International Airport in New York City to Minneapolis-St. Paul International Airport in Minneapolis, Minnesota, suddenly rolls sharply to the right over Saginaw, Michigan, and goes into a spiral dive from 39,000 feet (12,000 m) including two 360-degree rolls despite corrective measures taken by both the autopilot and the human pilot, losing 34,000 feet (10,000 m) of altitude in 63 seconds before the flight crew manages to pull out of the dive at 5,000 feet (1,500 m). Eight passengers suffer minor injuries caused by exposure to high G forces. The plane makes an emergency landing at Detroit, Michigan, without further incident.
- April 23 – SAETA Flight 11, a Vickers 785D Viscount (registration HC-AVP) disappears during a domestic flight in Ecuador from Quito to Cuenca with the loss of all 57 people on board. The plane's wreckage will be discovered in 1984 at a location 25 nautical miles (29 miles; 46 kilometers) off course on high ground in Ecuador's Pastaza Province.

=== May ===
- May 1 – Continental Airlines inaugurates service to the South Pacific, flying from Los Angeles, California, to Australia via Honolulu, American Samoa, Fiji, and New Zealand.
- May 7 – Beechcraft announces its intention to re-enter the commuter airliner market. It had last produced a commuter airliner in late 1977.
- May 25 – American Airlines Flight 191, a McDonnell Douglas DC-10 crashes at O'Hare International Airport, Chicago shortly after take-off after its number one engine detaches during its takeoff, killing all 271 on board and two more on the ground, making it the deadliest air disaster in American history.
- May 27 – A Mauritanian Air Force de Havilland Canada DHC-5D Buffalo crashes in the Atlantic Ocean off Dakar, Senegal, killing all 12 people on board. The prime minister of Mauritania, Lieutenant Colonel Ahmed Ould Bouceif, is among the dead.
- May 30 – Downeast Airlines Flight 46, a de Havilland Canada DHC-6 Twin Otter 200 (registration N68DE) strikes trees and crashes on approach to Knox County Regional Airport in Rockland, Maine, killing all 17 of the 18 people on board.

=== June ===
- Three Iraqi Air Force aircraft bomb several Iranian villages near the northern Iran-Iraq border which Iraq suspects house Kurdish rebels.
- Continental Airlines inaugurates service linking Denver, Colorado, with Washington, D.C., Las Vegas, Nevada, and San Francisco and San Jose, California. It also begins service between Houston, Texas, and Tampa, Florida.
- June 6 – In the wake of the May 25 crash of American Airlines Flight 191, the U.S. Federal Aviation Administration revokes the Douglas DC-10's type certificate, grounding all DC-10s pending modifications to their slat actuation and position systems and stall warning and power supply changes. Until July 13, all U.S. DC-10s will remain grounded and foreign DC-10s will be prohibited from operating in the United States.
- June 7 – An Indian Air Force Hindustan Aeronautics Ltd. HAL-748-LFD Srs. 2M crashes in the Karmwal Pass in the Himalayas near Leh, India, at an altitude of 16,000 feet (4,900 meters), killing all 28 people on board.
- June 8 – Apparently wanting to be flown to the United States to see his estranged wife and children, 36-year-old seaman Phillip Sillery enters the cockpit of a Trans Australia Airlines Douglas DC-9-31 armed with a sawn-off 12-gauge shotgun and hijacks the airliner during a domestic flight in Australia from Coolangatta to Brisbane. After the plane lands at Brisbane's Eagle Farm Airport, Sillery allows all the passengers to disembark. As he holds the shotgun to the captain′s head, a stewardess knocks him off balance, allowing the co-pilot to grab him. The crew then overpowers Sillery, who is arrested.
- June 11
  - A United States Forest Service Douglas C-47A-90-DL Skytrain carrying personnel, two dogs, and 3,100 pounds (1,400 kg) of equipment to the Moose Creek Ranger Station on Idaho's Selway River suffers the failure of its left engine, after which its right engine catches fire, explodes, and detaches from the aircraft. The C-47 glides to a crash-landing in which it strikes a tree and lands in a river in a narrow canyon at an altitude of 2,000 feet (610 meters). Nine of the 12 people on board die immediately, and one of three survivors succumbs to his injuries before reaching a hospital.
  - Eduardo Guerra Jimenez, who had flown from Cuba to the United States in 1969 in a stolen Cuban Revolutionary Air and Air Defense Force MiG-21 (NATO reporting name "Fishbed") fighter, hijacks Delta Air Lines Flight 1061 – a Lockheed L-1011 Tristar with 207 people on board flying from New York City to Fort Lauderdale, Florida – and forces it to fly to Havana, Cuba, where he is arrested. The airliner then flies to Miami, Florida. It is the first hijacking of a U.S. airliner to Cuba in 4½ years and the 170th hijacking of a U.S. airliner in history.
- June 12 – Flying the Gossamer Albatross from Folkestone Warren, England, to a French beach south of Cap Gris-Nez in 2 hours 49 minutes, Bryan Allen becomes the first person to cross the English Channel in a pedal-powered aircraft.
- June 17 – Air New England Flight 248, a de Havilland DHC-6 Twin Otter 300, crashes at Camp Greenough in the Yarmouth Port section of Yarmouth, Massachusetts, while on approach to a landing at Barnstable Municipal Airport in Barnstable County, Massachusetts. The pilot, Air New England co-founder George Parmenter, dies, but the other nine people on board all survive, including author Robert Sabbag.
- June 20
  - Nikola Kavaja, a Serbian nationalist and anti-communist, hijacks American Airlines Flight 293, a Boeing 727, shortly before it lands in Chicago, Illinois, intending to gain control of an aircraft that he can crash into Yugoslav Communist Party headquarters in Belgrade, Yugoslavia. He allows the passengers and most of the crew to debark, then orders the crew to fly the 727 to LaGuardia Airport in New York City. There he demands and receives a Boeing 707, which he orders to be flown to Shannon, Ireland, where he intends to take control of the 707 for the suicide flight to Belgrade, but the hijacking ends when he surrenders to authorities in Shannon.
  - U.S. Navy Lieutenant Donna L. Spruill pilots a Grumman C-1 Trader to an arrested landing aboard the aircraft carrier USS Independence (CV-62), becoming the first female U.S. Navy pilot to carrier-qualify in fixed-wing aircraft.
- June 23 – The Tupolev Tu-144 supersonic transport, withdrawn from passenger service in June 1978, re-enters service, with the longer-range Tu-144D model beginning Aeroflot cargo-only domestic flights in the Soviet Union between Moscow and Khabarovsk.
- June 27 – Israeli Air Force F-15 Eagles shoot down four Syrian Air Force Mikoyan-Gurevich MiG-21s. These are the first kills for the F-15.
- June 28 – French documentary filmmaker Philippe Cousteau, son of Jacques-Yves Cousteau and Simone Cousteau, dies at Lisbon, Portugal, while at the controls of a PBY-6A Catalina amphibian flying boat for a high-speed taxi run on the Tagus to test the hull for leaks after a water landing. One of the plane's propellers separates and cuts through the cockpit, killing him.
- June 30 – Wanting to return to Cuba to join the revolution of Fidel Castro after living in Puerto Rico and armed with a bottle, 46-year-old Cuban exile Igoberto Gonzalez Sanchez hijacks Eastern Airlines Flight 932, a Lockheed L-1011 Tristar with 306 people on board flying from San Juan, Puerto Rico, to Miami, Florida. Crew members and passengers subdue him, and he is arrested after the airliner arrives at Miami.

=== July ===
- July 1 – North Central Airlines and Southern Airways merge to form Republic Airlines, with headquarters at Minneapolis-St. Paul International Airport in Minneapolis, Minnesota.
- July 2 – The Swiss airline Crossair begins scheduled service, offering flights from Zürich, Switzerland to Nuremberg, West Germany, Innsbruck, Austria, and Klagenfurt, Austria.
- July 9 – A hijacker commandeers an Aerolineas Condor Fokker F27 Friendship during a domestic flight in Ecuador from Tulcán to Quito, demanding to be flown to Costa Rica. The hijacker is taken down at Quito.
- July 11 – A Garuda Indonesia Fokker F-28 Fellowship crashes into Mount Sibayak on Sumatra in Indonesia, killing all 61 people on board.
- July 13 – The U.S. Federal Aviation Administration restores the Douglas DC-10's type certificate, allowing U.S. DC-10s to fly and foreign DC-10s to operate in the United States for the first time since June 6.
- July 20 – A hijacker takes control of United Airlines Flight 320 – a Boeing 727 with 126 people on board flying from Denver, Colorado, to Omaha, Nebraska – and demands to be flown to Cuba. The hijacker is taken down at Omaha.
- July 23 – The British government announces plans to privatise British Airways and publicly sell British Aerospace shares.
- July 25 – A hijacker commandeers a Biman Bangladesh Airlines Fokker F27 Friendship during a domestic flight in Bangladesh from Jessore to Dacca and demands ransom money. The airliner diverts to Calcutta, India, where the hijacker surrenders.
- July 27 – Israeli Air Force Kfir C.1 fighters escorting reconnaissance aircraft over Lebanon encounter Syrian Air Force MiG-21 (NATO reporting name "Fishbed-J") fighters and shoot one down with a Shafrir-2 air-to-air missile. It is the only aerial victory by a Kfir C.1 in Israeli service.
- July 31
  - Dan-Air Flight 0034, a Hawker Siddeley HS 748, crashes into the sea while attempting to take off from Sumburgh Airport on the Shetland Mainland in Scotland, drowning 17 of the 47 people on board.
  - Western Airlines Flight 44, a Boeing 737-200, mistakenly lands at Buffalo, Wyoming, instead of its intended destination, which is Sheridan, Wyoming. No one is injured, and the only damage is to the tarmac at the airport, which was not designed to support the weight of the jetliner. The incident prompts a legal battle and subsequent landmark aviation ruling in Ferguson v. NTSB in June 1982.

=== August ===
- Six months after the Iranian Revolution, all 79 of the Islamic Republic of Iran Air Force's F-14 Tomcats have been sabotaged to prevent them from firing AIM-54 Phoenix air-to-air missiles, and most of its combat aircraft are not operational; most Iranian helicopters are not airworthy, and Iran has made plans to cannibalize half of its helicopters for spare parts in order to fly the remainder.
- August 2 – New York Yankees catcher Thurman Munson is practicing takeoffs and landings at the controls of a Cessna Citation I/SP with a friend and a flight instructor on board at Akron-Canton Regional Airport in Green, Ohio, when the Citation comes down short of the runway and crashes during a landing attempt, killing Munson and injuring the other two men.
- August 3 – An Aeroflot Let L-410M Turbolet experiences an engine failure on approach to Rzhevka Airport in Leningrad Oblast in the Soviet Union's Russian Soviet Federated Socialist Republic. Its crew attempts a go-around, but the airliner crashes 0.5 kilometers (0.31 miles) northeast of the airport, killing 10 of the 14 people on board.
- August 4 – An Indian Airlines Hindustan Aeronautics Ltd. HAL-748-224 Srs. 2 crashes in the Kiroli Hills while on approach to Santacruz Airport in Bombay, India, killing all 45 people on board.
- August 5 – Three armed men seeking to escape from the Spanish Foreign Legion hijack an Iberia Douglas DC-9-32 (registration EC-BIT) at Puerto del Rosario in the Canary Islands. After a stop at Lisbon, Portugal, the plane flies them to Geneva, Switzerland, where they surrender.
- August 11 – Two Aeroflot Tupolev Tu-134 jetliners collide in mid-air over Dniprodzerzhynsk in the Soviet Union's Ukrainian Soviet Socialist Republic, killing all 156 people aboard the two planes. Among the dead are 17 players and staff of the then-Soviet-top-division Pakhtakor Football Club team.
- August 14 – Steve Hinton sets a new piston-engined airspeed record in a specially-modified P-51 Mustang named the RB51 Red Baron. He reaches 499 mph (803 km/h) over Nevada.
- August 16 – A hijacker commandeers Eastern Airlines Flight 980 – a Boeing 727 with 91 people on board – during a flight from Guatemala City, Guatemala, to Miami, Florida, demanding to be flown to Cuba. The hijacker surrenders at Miami.
- August 22 – A hijacker takes control of United Air Lines Flight 739 – a Boeing 727 with 120 people on board – during a flight from Portland, Oregon, to Los Angeles, California. The plane diverts to San Francisco, California, then returns to Portland, where the hijacker surrenders.
- August 24
  - During a domestic flight in the Soviet Union from Norilsk to Krasnoyarsk, all four engines of an Aeroflot Antonov An-12TB (registration CCCP-12963) flame out. The crew attempts to reach Yeniseysk Airport in Yeniseysk, but has to make a forced landing on a wooded hillside 18 kilometers (11 miles) from Yeniseysk. The airliner bursts into flames, and 11 of the 16 people on board die.
  - A hijacker commandeers a Libyan Arab Airlines Boeing 727 during a domestic flight in Libya from Benghazi to Tripoli, demanding to be flown to a non-Arab country. The plane diverts to Larnaca, Cyprus, where the hijacker surrenders.
- August 29 – When a crew member inadvertently extends a flap while an Aeroflot Tupolev Tu-124V (registration CCCP-45038) cruises at 27,000 feet (8,200 meters) during a flight from Kyiv in the Soviet Union's Ukrainian Soviet Socialist Republic to Kazan in the Russian Soviet Federated Socialist Republic, the airliner goes into a spin. It disintegrates at an altitude of 3,000 meters (9,800 feet) and crashes near Kirsanov, killing all 63 people on board.
- August 30 – A U.S. Navy CH-53D Sea Stallion helicopter of Air Transport Squadron 24 (VR-24) lifts a 12-foot (3.7-meter) statue of the Madonna and Child too large to transport by land to the top of Mount Tiberius on the Italian island of Capri, replacing one destroyed by lightning.

=== September ===
- Aer Lingus becomes the first airline other than Alitalia to be used by Pope John Paul II, when he flies aboard the specially modified Boeing 747 St. Patrick (registration EI-ASI) from Rome to Dublin and later from Shannon, Ireland, to Boston, Massachusetts.
- September 3
  - Aeroflot Flight A-513, an Antonov An-24B (registration CCCP-46269), strikes a hill at a speed of 206 km/h (128 mph) while on approach to Amderma Airport in Amderma in the Soviet Union's Russian Soviet Federated Socialist Republic. It breaks up, and its main wreckage comes to rest on a beach 20 to 30 meters (66 to 98 ft) from the edge of the Kara Sea. The crash kills 40 of the 43 people on board.
  - Both engines of a Sterling Airways Aérospatiale SN.601 Corvette (registration OY-SBS) catch fire while it is on approach to Nice Côte d'Azur Airport in Nice, France. It crashes into the Mediterranean Sea 1 kilometer (0.62 miles) southwest of the airport, killing all 10 people on board.
- September 7 – Three members of the "Imam Sadr Movement" hijack an Alitalia Douglas DC-8-62H (registration I-DIWW) with 183 people on board during a flight from Beirut, Lebanon, to Rome, Italy. They demand information on the 31 August 1978 disappearance of Mousa Sadr in Libya. They release the passengers at Rome, then force the airliner to fly to Tehran, Iran, where they surrender after a statement they wrote is broadcast on radio and television.
- September 12 – A man armed with what appears to be a pistol hijacks a Lufthansa Boeing 727-230 during a domestic flight in West Germany from Frankfurt-am-Main to Cologne. He demands a meeting with Chancellor of Germany Helmut Schmidt in the presence of the news media. Seven hours of negotiations ensue after the plane lands at Cologne; the hijacker then reads a message to political leaders calling for a more humane world before releasing the passengers and four of the seven crew members. After several more hours of negotiations, he releases the rest of the crew and surrenders. His weapons turns out to be a toy pistol.
- September 14
  - Aero Trasporti Italiani (ATI) Flight 12, a McDonnell Douglas DC-9-32 (registration I-ATJC), crashes into Conca d'Oru at a height of 2,000 feet (610 meters) on Sardinia near Sarroch, Italy, while trying to fly around thunderstorms on approach to Cagliari Elmas Airport in Cagliari, killing all 31 people on board.
  - A Butler Aircraft Company Douglas DC-7 (registration N4SW) operating on a company business flight strikes trees on the crest of 6,401-foot (1,951-meter) Surveyor Mountain and crashes 39 kilometers (24 miles) northwest of Klamath Falls, Oregon, killing all 12 people on board.
- September 21
  - There is a big fire at Bombay Airport which kills a few people. Authorities battle the blaze for many hours.

=== October ===
- October 1 – The United States Air Force transfers all of the Aerospace Defense Command's interceptor squadrons and bases and air warning radar stations to the Tactical Air Command.
- October 7 – Swissair Flight 316, a Douglas DC-8-62 (registration HB-IDE), overruns the runway while landing at Ellinikon International Airport in Athens, Greece. The tail and left wing separate from the fuselage and the airliner comes to rest on a public road. A fire breaks out, and 14 of the 154 people on board die of burns or smoke inhalation.
- October 16 – Three hijackers commandeer a Libyan Arab Airlines Fokker F27 Friendship (registration 5A-DDU) during a domestic flight in Libya from Hun to Tripoli and force it to fly to Malta, where they surrender.
- October 27 – A Mexican government Beechcraft 200 Super King Air (registration XC-PGR) operated by the Office of the General Prosecutor strikes a power pole at a height of 14 feet (4.3 meters) north of San Ysidro, California, while on approach to Tijuana International Airport in Tijuana, Mexico, and crashes, killing all 10 people on board.
- October 30
  - Sir Barnes Wallis, inventor of the bouncing bomb, geodetic airframe, and earthquake bomb, dies at the age of 82.
  - A hijacker claiming to have a bomb commandeers Pacific Southwest Airlines Flight 784 – a Boeing 727 with 108 people on board flying from Los Angeles to San Diego, California – demanding to be flown to Mexico. The airliner diverts to Tijuana, Mexico, where the hijacker surrenders.
- October 31
  - Midway Airlines begins flight operations, using three Douglas DC-9s from Trans World Airlines to offer service from Chicago′s Midway Airport to Cleveland Burke Lakefront Airport in Cleveland, Ohio, to Kansas City, Missouri, and to Detroit, Michigan and to Wisconsin, Wisconsin.
  - Western Airlines Flight 2605, a McDonnell Douglas DC-10-10, mistakenly lands on a closed runway in fog at Mexico City International Airport in Mexico City, Mexico, strikes a parked truck, crashes, and bursts into flames. Seventy-two of the 89 people on board die.

=== November ===
- November 1 – After the Liberian oil tanker Burmah Agate and the Liberian cargo ship Mimosa collide in the Gulf of Mexico off Galveston, Texas, just outside Galveston Bay, the United States Coast Guard Sikorsky HH-52A Seaguard helicopter Rescue 1426 airlifts 22 men to safety from Mimosa, which is out of control and steaming in circles, to safety aboard a nearby offshore oil platform in three trips; on its first trip alone, the helicopter carries 12 Mimosa crewmen along with its own crew of three. Low on fuel, Rescue 1426 returns to its base at Coast Guard Air Station Houston, Texas. In 2016, Rescue 1426 will become the first U.S. Coast Guard aircraft placed on display at the National Air and Space Museum's Steven F. Udvar-Hazy Center in Virginia.
- November 4 – The Iranian hostage crisis begins as Iranian students take over the United States Embassy in Tehran. The United States quickly halts all spare-parts shipments and technical assistance to the Iranian Air Force and imposes an embargo on Iran, and the United Kingdom also cuts off most military shipments to Iran.
- November 11 – Hawaiian Airlines celebrates 50 years of accident-free air passenger service.
- November 15 – A bomb planted by the Unabomber in the cargo hold of a Boeing 727 operating as American Airlines Flight 444 from Chicago, Illinois, to Washington, D.C., malfunctions, failing to detonate but giving off large quantities of smoke. Twelve of the 78 people on board are treated for smoke inhalation. The attack brings the Federal Bureau of Investigation into the Unabomber investigation for the first time because attacking the airliner is the Unabomber's first federal crime.
- November 19 – An Ecuadorian Army IAI Arava 201 crashes on takeoff from Camilo Ponce Enriquez Airport in Loja, Ecuador, killing all 16 people on board. General Rafael Rodríques Palacios and his wife and daughter are among the dead.
- November 23 – Armed with a plastic knife and a bottle opener, a 25-year-old male passenger hijacks a Japan Air Lines Douglas DC-10-40 with 356 people on board during a domestic flight in Japan from Osaka to Tokyo′s Haneda Airport and demands to be flown to the Soviet Union. To refuel, the airliner diverts to Tokyo's Narita International Airport, where the hijacker is overpowered and arrested before refueling is completed.
- November 24 – A hijacker commandeers American Airlines Flight 395 – a Boeing 727 with 74 people on board flying from San Antonio to El Paso, Texas – and demands to be flown to Iran. Police storm the airliner and arrest the hijacker at El Paso.
- November 26 – A flight attendant reports a fire aboard Pakistan International Airlines Flight 740, a Boeing 707-340C, 18 minutes after takeoff from Jeddah International Airport in Jeddah, Saudi Arabia. The fire spreads rapidly, causing panic in the passenger cabin and incapacitating the flight crew and the aircraft crashes, killing all 156 people on board.
- November 28
  - A Douglas DC-10 operating as Air New Zealand Flight 901 crashes on Mount Erebus in Antarctica during a sightseeing flight, killing all 257 people aboard.
  - The U.S. Federal Aviation Administration suspends the Airline Transport Pilot certificate of Western Airlines pilot Lowell G. Ferguson and charges him with violating four sections of the Federal Aviation Regulations in the mistaken landing at the wrong airport of Western Airlines Flight 44 – of which he was the pilot in command – on July 31. Ferguson will appeal the suspension, eventually leading to the landmark Ferguson v. NTSB decision of June 1982.

=== December ===
- December 12 – A Commercializadora Aérea Mixta Boliviana (CAMBA) Martin 4-0-4 cargo aircraft (registration CP-1440) crashes after takeoff near Apolo Airport in Apolo, Bolivia, killing 10 of the 11 people on board.
- December 18 – A SATENA Douglas C-54D-10-DC Skymaster (registration FAC-1106) crashes into the mountain Cerro Toledo between Arauca and Cúcuta, Colombia, at an altitude of 11,145 feet (3,397 meters), killing all 21 people on board.
- December 22 – A Peruvian Air Force de Havilland Canada DHC-5D Buffalo crashes into the jungle near Puerto Esperanza, Peru, killing all 29 people on board.
- December 23
  - A Douglas Airways GAF Nomad N.22B (registration P2-DNL) crashes during a runway overshoot at Manari Airport in Manari, Papua New Guinea, killing all 16 people on board.
  - The Turkish Airlines Fokker F28-1000 Fellowship Trabzon crashes into a hill near Kuyumcuköy in the Çubuk district of Ankara Province while on approach to Esenboğa Airport in Ankara, killing 41 of the 45 people on board.
- December 25
  - The Soviet–Afghan War begins as Soviet Air Force Antonov An-12s (NATO reporting name "Cub") and An-22s (NATO reporting name "Cock") airlift the first Soviet troops into Afghanistan, bringing in 5,000 troops in the first 24 hours.
  - A Soviet Air Forces Ilyushin Il-76M (NATO reporting name "Candid") transporting paratroopers of the Soviet Airborne Troops to Bagram Airfield in Afghanistan, crashes into the top of a mountain 36 kilometers (22 miles) from Kabul at an altitude of 5,000 meters (16,000 feet) while descending toward Bagram at night, killing all 43 people on board. At the time, it is the deadliest aviation accident in the history of Afghanistan.

== First flights ==
- Antonov An-32 ("Cline")

=== February ===
- February 28 – PAC Cresco

=== March ===
- March 9 – Dassault Mirage 4000
- March 22 – CP-140 Aurora

=== April ===
- April 10 – Westland 30 G-BGHF
- April 19 – Learjet 55

=== May ===
- May 15 – Dassault Mirage 50
- May 18 – Piper PA-42 Cheyenne
- May 30 – Cessna Citation III

=== June ===
- June 3 – PZL Kania
- June 12 – Rutan Long-EZ prototype, N79RA
- June 13 – MBB/Kawasaki BK 117
- June 13 – Solar-Powered Aircraft Developments Solar One
- June 28 – Akaflieg Darmstadt D-39

=== July ===
- July 17 – Taylor Bird
- July 21 – Bell 214ST
- July 23 – PZL M-20 Mewa
- July 24 – Bell XV-15 – first transition from helicopter to airplane mode.

=== August ===
- August 2 – Schweizer SGS 1-36 Sprite
- August 21 – Van's Aircraft RV-4

=== September ===
- September 26 – Westland Commando
- September 27 – Eurocopter AS355

=== October ===
- October 17 – Cessna T303 Crusader
- October 18 – McDonnell Douglas DC-9 Super 80
- October 27 – Panavia Tornado ADV

=== November ===
- November 16 – PZL W-3 Sokół
- November 30 – Piper Malibu

=== December ===
- December 2 – Gulfstream III
- December 12 – SH-60 Seahawk 161169
- December 14 – Edgley Optica G-BGMW
- December 21 – NASA AD-1
- December 22 – Aérospatiale Epsilon

== Entered service ==
- Westland Lynx with the British Army′s Army Air Corps
- Mid-1979 – Beechcraft Model F90 Super King Air

=== January ===
- January 6 – F-16 Fighting Falcon with the 388th Tactical Fighter Wing USAF.

=== May ===
- Dassault/Dornier Alpha Jet with the French Air Force

== Deadliest crash ==
The deadliest crash of this year was American Airlines Flight 191, a McDonnell Douglas DC-10 which crashed just after takeoff from O'Hare International Airport in Chicago, Illinois, U.S. on 25 May, killing all 271 people on board, as well as two on the ground.
