= 1978 in aviation =

This is a list of aviation-related events from 1978.

== Events ==
- The Dominican Republic airline Aerovías Quisqueyana shuts down. It had operated since 1962.

=== January ===
- The Government of India establishes the Bureau of Civil Aviation Security as a department of the Directorate General of Civil Aviation.
- January 1
  - Air India Flight 855, a Boeing 747-237B, crashes into the Arabian Sea just off Bombay, India, immediately after takeoff from Sahar International Airport, killing all 213 people on board.
  - British Aircraft Corporation, Hawker Siddeley, and Scottish Aviation are absorbed into British Aerospace.
- January 18
  - Eastern Air Lines Flight 274, a Boeing 727-25, makes a two-point landing at Miami International Airport in Miami, Florida, after its nose wheel locks in the up position. There are no injuries to any of the 76 people on board and only minor damage is sustained by the airliner.
  - Two hijackers commandeer a SAETA Sud Aviation SE-210 Caravelle during a domestic flight in Ecuador from Quito to Guayaquil and force it to fly to Havana, Cuba.
- January 20 – A hijacker commandeers a Pakistan International Airlines Fokker F27 Friendship during a domestic flight in Pakistan from Sukkur to Karachi, demanding money for cancer treatments. The hijacker is taken down at Karachi.
- January 28
  - A SADELCA Douglas DC-3D on a domestic flight in Colombia crashes into the cloud-covered mountain Cerro Granada at an altitude of 6,800 feet (2,100 meters), killing all 12 people on board.
  - A hijacker seizes control of Piedmont Airlines Flight 964 – a NAMC YS-11 with 14 people on board flying from Kinston to Wilmington, North Carolina – demanding to be flown to Cuba. The plane lands at Kinston and then flies to New Bern, North Carolina. The hijacker is taken down.

=== February ===
- February 6 – A hijacker commandeers a CSA Czech Airlines Tupolev Tu-134 with 39 people on board during a flight from East Berlin, East Germany, to Prague, Czechoslovakia, and forces it to fly to Frankfurt-am-Main, West Germany.
- February 10
  - A TAMU Douglas C-47A-75-DL Skytrain (registration CX-BJH/T-511) crashes soon after takeoff from Artigas Airport in Artigas, Uruguay, killing all 44 people on board.
  - Columbia Pacific Airlines Flight 23, a Beechcraft Model 99 (registration N199EA), stalls and crashes immediately after takeoff from Richland Airport in Richland, Washington. The aircraft bursts into flames, and all 17 people on board die.
- February 11 – To avoid a snow plow on the runway at Cranbrook/Canadian Rockies International Airport near Cranbrook, British Columbia, Canada, Pacific Western Airlines Flight 314, a Boeing 737-200, aborts its landing and attempts a go-around, but its thrust reversers do not retract fully and it crashes, killing 42 of the 49 people on board.
- February 22 – An arson fire destroys the San Diego Aerospace Museum in San Diego, California. Several one-of-a-kind aircraft are destroyed, including the Beecraft Wee Bee and Beecraft Honey Bee, as well as a reproduction of the Spirit of St. Louis.

=== March ===
- March 1 – A Nigeria Airways Fokker F28 Fellowship 1000 (registration 5N-ANA) on approach to Kano International Airport in Kano, Nigeria, collides with a Nigerian Air Force MiG-21U (NATO reporting name "Fishbed") trainer performing touch-and-go landings. Both aircraft crash, killing all 16 people on the Fokker and both crew members of the MiG-21U.
- March 2 – A hijacker commandeers a Pakistan International Airlines Boeing 747-282B bound from Islamabad to Karachi, Pakistan. The hijacker is taken down at Islamabad.
- March 3 – After a Linea Aeropostal Venezolana Hawker Siddeley HS 748 (registration YV-45C) experiences artificial horizon problems after takeoff from Maiquetía Airport in Maiquetía, Venezuela, its crew attempts to return to the airport. On approach, it crashes into the Caribbean Sea 5.2 kilometers (3.2 miles) off Punta Mulatos, killing all 47 people on board.
- March 9 – A hijacker takes control of a China Airlines Boeing 737-281 (registration B-1870) bound from Kaohsiung, Taiwan, to Hong Kong. The hijacker is taken down at Hong Kong. There is one fatality during the incident.
- March 11 – Flight Lieutenant David Cyster arrives in Darwin, Australia, completing a 32-day, 9,000-mile (14,493-km) flight from England in the de Havilland DH.82a Tiger Moth G-ANRF to commemorate the 50th anniversary of Bert Hinkler's first solo England-to-Australia flight in 1928.
- March 13 – Clay Thomas hijacks United Air Lines Flight 696 – a Boeing 727 with 75 people on board – shortly after it takes off from San Francisco, California, for a flight to Seattle, Washington. He orders the airliner to stop at Oakland, California, to take on fuel for a flight to Cuba. At Oakland, he releases all of the passengers and cabin crew, then panics when he sees police vehicles and orders the plane to take off again immediately without taking aboard a full load of fuel. Once the plane is airborne, the pilot explains that the plane still lacks the fuel to reach Cuba, and Thomas agrees to let it land at Denver, Colorado, to take on more fuel. At Denver, the pilot, copilot, and flight engineer all jump to safety from the cockpit windows to the tarmac. With no hostages and no one to fly the plane left aboard, Thomas quietly surrenders to the police five minutes later.
- March 16 – A Balkan Bulgarian Airlines Tupolev Tu-134 crashes near Gabare, Bulgaria, killing all 73 people on board.
- March 25 – A Burma Airways Fokker F27 Friendship 200 (registration XY-ADK) loses height during its initial climb after takeoff from Mingaladon Airport in Rangoon, Burma, strikes trees, crashes in a rice paddy about 16 kilometers (9.9 miles) north of the airport, and burns, killing all 48 people on board.

=== April ===
- April 1
  - The Canadian Snowbirds aerobatic team officially becomes 431 Air Demonstration Squadron.
  - A hijacker at Richmond International Airport in Richmond, Virginia, commandeers Piedmont Airlines Flight 66 – a Boeing 737-200 bound for Norfolk, Virginia, with 66 people on board – and forces the plane to fly to New York City, where he is arrested.
- April 15 – Flying in deteriorating weather, American stunt pilot Frank Tallman dies when the Piper PA-23 Aztec he is piloting crashes into the side of Santiago Peak in the Santa Ana Mountains near Trabuco Canyon, California.
- April 18 – The Vickers Viscount becomes the first turboprop airliner to see 25 years in service.
- April 20 – Korean Airlines Flight 902, a Boeing 707-321B flying from Anchorage, Alaska, to Seoul, South Korea, with 109 people on board, veers drastically off course and violates Soviet airspace over the Kola Peninsula. A Soviet Air Defense Forces Sukhoi Su-15 (NATO reporting name "Flagon") fighter hits the airliner with an air-to-air missile, badly damaging the left wing and puncturing the fuselage, killing two passengers. The plane eventually makes a crash landing on a frozen lake near Loukhi, where Soviet helicopters rescue the 107 survivors.
- April 26 – Possibly due to engine trouble, a United States Navy P-3 Orion patrol aircraft (BuNo 152724) of Patrol Squadron 23 (VP-23) crashes in the Atlantic Ocean near Naval Air Facility Lajes in Lajes in the Azores, killing the crew of seven.
- April 30 – Southern Airways flies its last Martin 4-0-4 flight. It is the last piston-engined airliner flight by a major U.S. air carrier.

=== May ===
- National Airlines inaugurates nonstop service from Florida to both Frankfurt-am-Main, West Germany, and Amsterdam, the Netherlands.
- May 6 – A hijacker commandeers an Aeroflot airliner during a domestic flight in the Soviet Union from Ashgabat to Mineralnye Vody, demanding to be flown abroad. There is one fatality during the incident.
- May 8 – The National Airlines Boeing 727-235 Donna, operating as Flight 193, crashes into Escambia Bay while on descent to Pensacola, Florida, killing three of the 58 people on board and injuring 11 of the 55 survivors.
- May 10 – Three hijackers force a CSA Czech Airlines Ilyushin Il-18 making a domestic flight in Czechoslovakia from Prague to Brno to divert to Frankfurt-am-Main, West Germany.
- May 11 – Two 29-year-old male passengers hijack Avianca Flight 163 – a Boeing 727-59 (registration HK-727) with 119 people on board making a domestic flight in Colombia from Santa Marta to Bogotá – and force the airliner to divert to Cali, Colombia. After it refuels, they order it to fly to Aruba, where they release several passengers and the plane again refuels. The plane then flies to Curaçao, where the hijackers release more passengers before policemen dressed as mechanics overpower and arrest them.
- May 16 – Two hijackers commandeer Aeroméxico Flight 201 – a Douglas DC-9-32 with 99 people on board making a domestic flight in Mexico from Torreón to Mexico City – demanding the release of prisoners. They surrender after the airliner lands at Mexico City.
- May 16–27 – Eighteen U.S. Air Force C-141 Starlifters fly 32 missions to transport 850 short tons (771 metric tons) of cargo and 125 passengers to Zaire in support of French Foreign Legion troops and Belgian paratroopers deploying there to oppose the Shaba II invasion of the Zairian province of Shaba by a separatist movement.
- May 17
  - A Japan Maritime Self-Defense Force Shin Meiwa PS-1 flying boat crashes at Takaoka, Japan, killing 13 people.
  - A hijacker seizes control of a CSA Czech Airlines Yakovlev Yak-40 making a domestic flight in Czechoslovakia from Brno to Prague. The airliner lands safely at Prague. The hijacker is taken down.
- May 19
  - A Belgian force of 1,171 paratroopers arrives at Kamina, Zaire, in Belgian aircraft to intervene in the Shaba II crisis.
  - Paratroopers of the French Foreign Legion jump into Kolwezi, Zaire, from three French Transall C-160 and four Zairian C-130 Hercules aircraft to intervene against separatists during the Shaba II crisis, meeting little organized resistance.
- May 20
  - Belgian troops land unopposed the airfield at Kolwezi after Zairian ground forces have seized it. Additional French Foreign Legion paratroopers jump over Kolwezi later in the day.
  - McDonnell Douglas delivers its 5,000th F-4 Phantom II aircraft, 20 years after the first flight of the prototype.
- May 21 – American lyricist, screenwriter, director, and television producer Bruce Geller is one of the two people killed when the Cessna 337 Skymaster he is piloting crashes in foggy conditions in Buena Vista Canyon near Santa Barbara, California.
- May 23 – In the 1978 Yegoryevsk Tu-144 crash, the first Tupolev Tu-144D experiences an in-flight fire during a pre-delivery test flight from Khabarovsk Novy Airport in Khabarovsk in the Soviet Union's Russian Soviet Federated Socialist Republic and crash-lands in a field at Yegoryevsk six minutes later after all its engines fail. The plane's nose cone collapses under the fuselage during the landing and penetrates a compartment in which two flight engineers are seated, killing them. The other six people on board survive.
- May 24 – Barbara Ann Oswald hijacks a St. Louis, Missouri-based charter helicopter and orders its pilot, Allen Barklage, to fly it to United States Penitentiary, Marion, in Marion, Illinois, so that her husband, Garrett B. Trapnell – imprisoned there for a 1972 airliner hijacking – can escape. Barklage wrestles Oswald's gun from her as he lands the helicopter in the prison yard and shoots her to death. In December, her daughter Robin Oswald will hijack an airliner in an unsuccessful attempt to get Trapnell released.
- May 29 – A hijacker seizes control of a CSA Czech Airlines Yakovlev Yak-40 making a domestic flight in Czechoslovakia from Brno to Karlovy Vary, demanding to be flown to West Germany. The airliner diverts to Prague, Czechoslovakia, where the hijacker is taken down.
- May 31 – U.S. Air Force C-141 Starlifter aircraft begin to transport French and Belgian troops as they withdraw from their intervention in the Shaba II affair in Zaire. Simultaneously, the C-141s begin airlift support for troops from Gabon, Ivory Coast, Morocco, Senegal, and Togo as they deploy into Shaba on peacekeeping duties.

=== June ===
- June 1 – The Tupolev Tu-144 supersonic transport makes its 55th and final passenger flight, an Aeroflot flight on the Soviet Union's domestic Moscow-Alma-Ata route. Tu-144s have carried a total of 3,194 passengers, an average of 58 passengers per flight. Although it never carries passengers again, the Tu-144 will resume cargo service in June 1979.
- June 9 – Inaugural flight of the Airlink helicopter shuttle service between London Gatwick and London Heathrow Airports.
- June 26 – Air Canada Flight 189, a Douglas DC-9-32, crashes on takeoff at Toronto International Airport, Toronto, Ontario, Canada, killing two passengers and injuring most of the other 105 people on board.

=== July ===
- July 1
  - Yemen Airways renames itself Yemenia.
  - The Government of Sweden creates the Swedish Accident Investigation Board, responsible for investigating civil and military accidents, including aviation accidents. It later will be renamed the Swedish Accident Investigation Authority.
- July 1–19 – Frank Haile Jr. and William Wisner fly two Beechcraft Bonanzas around the world in formation.
- July 11 – The Government of the United Kingdom agrees to fund development of the British Aerospace BAe 146 airliner.
- July 12 – An Ecuadorian Air Force Lockheed C-130H Hercules crashes into Ecuador's Pichincha Volcano, killing all 11 people on board.
- July 14 – After receiving orders from United Airlines, Boeing begins full-scale development of the Boeing 767.
- July 24 – McDonnell Douglas completes the 5,000th F-4 Phantom II.

=== August ===
- August 6 – A hijacker commandeers a KLM Douglas DC-9-32 with 63 people on board during a flight from Amsterdam, the Netherlands, to Madrid, Spain, demanding to be flown to Algiers, Algeria. The airliner diverts to Barcelona, Spain, where the hijacker is taken down.
- August 12–17 – Ben Abruzzo, Maxie Anderson, and Larry Newman make the first transatlantic crossing by balloon, taking 5 days 17 hours to travel from Presque Isle, Maine, to Evreux, France in the Double Eagle II
- August 14 – Flying in worsening weather conditions, an Aeropesca Colombia Curtiss C-46F-1-CU Commando (registration HK-1350) drifts off course and crashes into Mount Paramo de Laura near Tota, Colombia, killing all 18 people in board. Certified to carry only six passengers, it has 15 passengers on board at the time of the crash.
- August 25 – As Trans World Airlines Flight 830 – Boeing 707 with 89 people on board – flies from New York City′s John F. Kennedy International Airport to Geneva, Switzerland, someone drops a note near a sleeping flight attendant demanding the release of several prisoners, including the German World War II Nazi leader Rudolf Hess. After the airliner lands at Geneva, Swiss authorities question all the passengers in an attempt to determine who dropped the note.
- August 26 – A Burma Airways de Havilland Canada DHC-6 Twin Otter 300 (registration XY-AEI) stalls at an altitude of 400 feet (120 meters) during its initial climb after takeoff from Papun Airport in Papun, Burma, and crashes, killing all 14 people on board.
- August 30 – Two East Germans hijack LOT Flight 165, a Tupolev Tu-134 with 63 passengers on board, during a flight from Gdańsk, Poland, to East Berlin, taking a flight attendant hostage. They force the plane to fly to Tempelhof Airport in West Berlin, where all aboard the plane are released unharmed and the two hijackers and six other East German passengers on the plane claim sanctuary.

=== September ===
- Royal Air Maroc acquires its first wide-body aircraft, a Boeing 747-200B.
- September 2 – An Airwest Airlines de Havilland Canada DHC-6 Twin Otter 300 floatplane (registration CF-AIV) crashes on approach to a landing in Coal Harbor in Vancouver, British Columbia, Canada, after the failure of a flap control rod at an altitude of 175 feet (53 meters), killing 11 of the 13 people on board.
- September 3
  - Members of the Zimbabwe People's Revolutionary Army (ZIPRA) shoot down Air Rhodesia Flight 825, the Vickers Viscount Hunyani, with a Strela 2 (NATO reporting name "SA-7 Grail") surface-to-air missile west of Karoi, Rhodesia. Of the 56 people on board, 38 die in the crash and ZIPRA guerrillas shoot 10 more to death on the ground, leaving only eight survivors.
  - An Air Guinee Ilyushin Il-18D (registration 3X-GAX) crashes in a marsh on approach Conakry Airport in Conakry, Guinea, killing 15 of the 17 people on board.
- September 9 – A Lineas Aéreas del Centro de Havilland Canada DHC-6 Twin Otter 100 (registration XA-BOP) crashes in mountainous terrain near a highway 65 kilometers (40 miles) west of Mexico City, Mexico, killing 18 of the 21 people on board.
- September 14
  - A Philippine Air Force Fokker F27 Friendship 200 on approach to Nichols Air Base in the Philippines encounters windshear in a thunderstorm and crashes into a fish poind in Parañaque, killing 15 of the 24 people on the plane and 17 people on the ground.
  - Overseas National Airways ceases operations.
- September 25 – Pacific Southwest Airlines Flight 182, a Boeing 727 airliner, collides with a Cessna 172 over San Diego, California. There were no survivors on either plane, and with the seven fatalities on the ground the total number of lives lost was 144, making it the worst air disaster in California history to date.
- September 30 – Aarno Lamminparras, an unemployed home building contractor, hijacks Finnair Flight 405, a Sud Aviation SE-210 Caravelle with 47 other people on board flying from Oulu to Helsinki, Finland. At Helsinki, he allows 34 passengers off the plane, which he then forces to fly back to Oulu, where he receives a ransom payment from Finnair, then back to Helsinki, where he receives more money from a Finnish newspaper and releases the remaining 11 passengers. The aircraft then flies to Schiphol Airport in Amsterdam, the Netherlands, refuels, and returns to Helsinki for more ransom money from the newspaper before flying on to Oulu, where he releases his final three hostages in exchange for a chauffeured limousine ride home and 24 hours alone with his wife. Police storm his house and arrest him.
- September 30 – Finnair Caravelle OH-LSB is hijacked by an unemployed man with 44 passengers and 5 crew. The aircraft lands safely.

=== October ===
- Continental Airlines begins service from airports in the New York City area to Houston, Texas, and Denver, Colorado; from Denver to Phoenix, Arizona; and from Los Angeles, California, to Taipei, Taiwan, via Honolulu, Hawaii, and Guam.
- October 3 – After one of its engines fails, a Finnish Air Force Douglas C-47A-1-DK Skytrain attempts to return to Kuopio Airport in Siilinjärvi, Finland. On approach, the aircraft crashes into Lake Juurusvesi, killing all 15 people on board. The accident leads to the Finnish Air Force improving its pilot training for emergency situations and accelerating the retirement of its fleet of C-47 aircraft.
- October 4 – A Brazilian Air Force Consolidated C-10A Catalina flying boat crashes while landing on the Solimões River at Santo Antônio do Içá, Brazil, killing all 12 people on board.
- October 6 – A United States Navy Douglas R6D-1 taking part in a UNITAS multinational naval exercise involving Chile, Peru, and the United States crashes into a hill 17 kilometers (11 miles) south of Santiago, Chile, killing all 18 people on board.
- October 7 – An Aeroflot Yakovlev Yak-40 (registration CCCP-87437) suffers the failure of an engine due to icing during its initial climb after takeoff from Koltsovo Airport in Sverdlovsk in the Soviet Union's Russian Soviet Federated Socialist Republic, loses altitude, and crashes into a hill, killing all 38 people on board.
- October 22
  - A Solomon Airlines Britten-Norman BN-2A Islander (registration H4-AAC) attempts to return to Bellona/Anua Airport on Bellona Island in the Solomon Islands after encountering bad weather, but its pilot becomes lost and runs out of fuel before finding the airport. He ditches the plane in the Pacific Ocean, but neither the plane or any of the 11 people on board are ever found.
  - A hijacker commandeers a TAP Portugal Boeing 727-82C (registration CS-TBO) during a domestic flight in Portugal from Lisbon to Faro, demanding to be flown to Switzerland. The airliner diverts to Madrid, Spain, then returns to Lisbon, where the hijacker surrenders.
- October 23 – The crew of Aeroflot Flight 6515, an Antonov An-24B (registration CCCP-46327), turns on the airliner's de-icing system too late, and icing causes both its engines to flame out. The airliner crashes in the Sivash 24 kilometers (15 miles) from Emelyanovka in the Soviet Union's Ukrainian Soviet Socialist Republic, killing all 26 people on board.
- October 24 – President Jimmy Carter signs the Airline Deregulation Act into law. The act is intended to allow commercial aviation to be guided by market forces by removing United States Government control over air fares, air routes, and the entry of new airlines into markets. It requires the complete elimination of government restrictions on U.S. domestic routes and new services by December 31, 1981, the end of all U.S. domestic air fare regulation by January 1, 1983, the dissolution of the Civil Aeronautics Board by the end of 1984, the cessation of some air mail subsidies by January 1, 1986, and the termination of Essential Air Service subsidies ten years after enactment.
- October 30 – The Government of India approves the purchase of the SEPECAT Jaguar for the Indian Air Force

=== November ===
- November 5 – A Nile Delta Air Services Douglas DC-3 carrying American petroleum experts of the Western Desert Petroleum Company crashes into the Mediterranean Sea off Alexandria, Egypt, killing all 17 people on board.
- November 10 – A hijacker attempts to commandeer an Aeroflot Antonov An-24B (registration CCCP-46789) during a domestic flight in the Soviet Union from Grozny to Baku, intending to force it to fly to Turkey. He injures the flight engineer, but is killed by a ricochet from his own gun when he opens fire on the airliner's armored cockpit door. The plane diverts to Makhachkala, where it lands safely.
- November 15 – Icelandic Airlines Flight 001, a McDonnell Douglas DC-8, crashes at Katunayake, Sri Lanka, just short of the runway while on approach to land at Colombo International Airport in Colombo, Sri Lanka, killing 183 of the 262 people on board and injuring 32 of the 79 survivors. It remains the deadliest accident in the history of Icelandic aviation.
- November 18
  - The Swiss airline Business Flyers Basel AG changes its name to Crossair. It will begin offering scheduled flights in July 1979.
  - An Air Guadeloupe de Havilland Canada DHC-6 Twin Otter 300 flying from Pointe-à-Pitre, Guadeloupe, to Marie-Galante crashes into the sea 3 kilometers (1.9 miles) off Marie-Galante Airport after entering a violent rain squall, killing 15 of the 20 people on board.
- November 19 – An Indian Air Force Antonov An-12 on approach to Leh Airport in Leh, India, crashes into a hut in the Himalayas 0.5 kilometers (0.31 miles) from the airport and bursts into flames, killing all 77 people on the plane and a woman in the hut.
- November 20 – The United States Air Force orders development of the McDonnell Douglas KC-10 Extender aerial tanker.
- November 21 – A Taxi Aéreo El Venado Douglas C-47A-65-DL Skytrain (registration HK-1393) crashes into Judio Mountain about 30 kilometers (19 miles) south of Rubio, Venezuela, at an altitude of 11,200 feet (3,400 meters), killing all 28 people on board.
- November 23 – As North Central Airlines Flight 468 – a Douglas DC-9 with 23 people on board – sits on a runway at Dane County Regional Airport in Madison, Wisconsin, preparing to take off for a flight to Milwaukee, Wisconsin, a man armed with a knife and claiming to have a bomb hijacks it, saying he wants to be flown to an unintelligible destination. During negotiations with the authorities, he releases the passengers and crew and locks himself in the cockpit. Police force the cockpit door open and disarm and arrest him; he turns out to have no bomb. The airliner then proceeds with its flight to Milwaukee and then on to Chicago, Illinois.

=== December ===
- The retirement of the aircraft carrier HMS Ark Royal leaves the Royal Navy without a ship capable of operating high-performance fixed-wing aircraft for the first time since 1918.
- National Airlines introduces service between New York City and Amsterdam.
- December 11 – Masked men rob the Lufthansa cargo handling area at John F. Kennedy International Airport in New York, New York, of $5 million in cash and $875,000 in jewels newly flown in from West Germany in the largest cash robbery ever committed in the United States at the time. The robbery will be dramatized in the 1990 movie Goodfellas. The cash is never recovered, but five men finally will be indicted for the crime on January 23, 2014.
- December 14 – Claiming to have acid, a janitor hijacks National Airlines – a Boeing 727 with 54 people on board flying from John F. Kennedy International Airport in New York City to Miami, Florida – and demands that it fly to Cuba. The airliner diverts to Charleston, South Carolina, where police storm the plane and arrest the hijacker.
- December 20 – Claiming to have explosives, two men hijack Indian Airlines Flight 410 – a Boeing 737-200 with 132 people on board making a domestic flight in India from Calcutta to Lucknow – and force it to fly to Varanasi, India. They demand the release of Indira Gandhi, but surrender after four hours of negotiations. They turn out to be armed only with toy guns and a cricket ball.
- December 21 – Seventeen-year-old Robin Oswald hijacks Trans World Airlines Flight 541, a McDonnell Douglas DC-9 with 87 people on board, threatening to blow up the airliner if her father is not released from prison. The aircraft makes an emergency landing at Williamson County Regional Airport in Marion, Illinois, where authorities talk her into surrendering without further incident. Her father, Garrett B. Trapnell, had been imprisoned for a 1972 airliner hijacking and her mother, Barbara Ann Oswald, Trapnell's wife, had been killed when she hijacked a helicopter in May 1978 in order to help him escape from prison.
- December 23 – On approach to a landing in Palermo, Sicily, Alitalia Flight 4128, a McDonnell Douglas DC-9-32, crashes into the Tyrrhenian Sea about 3 km (1.9 mi) north of Palermo, killing 108 of the 129 on board and injuring all 21 survivors.
- December 26 – A Haiti Air Inter Britten-Norman BN-2A-21 Islander (registration HH-CNB) crashes into the sea off the Turks and Caicos Islands, killing all 10 people on board.
- December 28 – United Airlines Flight 173, a McDonnell Douglas DC-8-61, crashes in Portland, Oregon, killing 10 and injuring 28 of the 189 aboard. The aircraft had run out of fuel while the crew was troubleshooting landing gear indicator problems.
- December 29 – Freddie To makes the first flight of a solar-powered aircraft, the Solar One

== First flights ==
=== January ===
- January 11 - American Jet Industries Hustler Model 400 N400AJ, prototype of the Gulfstream American Hustler

=== February ===
- February 14 - Cessna 303 Clipper

=== March ===
- March 10 - Dassault Mirage 2000

=== April ===
- April 10 - Sikorsky S-72 NASA545 (2nd aircraft)

=== June ===
- June 30 - Rutan Defiant

=== July ===
- July 6 - NASA QSRA NASA715
- July 9 — EAA Acro Sport II

=== August ===
- August 12 – Pilatus PC-7 HB-HAO - first production
- August 20 – Aerospatiale Fouga 90 F-WZJB
- August 20 – British Aerospace Sea Harrier XZ450
- August 25 — Canadair CL-227 Sentinel UAV
- August 29 – Mitsubishi MU-300 Diamond

=== September ===
- September 12 – Cessna 425 Corsair
- September 13 - Aérospatiale Super Puma F-WZJA

=== October ===
- October 24 – Striplin FLAC
- October 28 — Scheibe SF 34

=== November ===
- November 8 - Canadair CL-600 Challenger C-GCGR-X
- November 9 - AV-8B Harrier II
- November 18 - McDonnell Douglas YF-18A Hornet 160775, prototype of the F/A-18 Hornet

=== December ===
- December 5 – Cessna 335
- December 19 - Beriev A-50 (NATO reporting name "Mainstay")
- December 30 - General Avia Canguro

== Entered service ==
=== January ===
- January 26 – Westland Lynx with No. 702 Squadron FAA

=== April ===
- HU-25 Guardian with United States Coast Guard
- Mitsubishi F-1 with Japan Air Self-Defense Force

=== June ===
- June 28 - Dassault Super Étendard with the Aéronavale

=== August ===
- August 20 – BAe Sea Harrier

== Retirements ==
- Convair F-102 Delta Dagger by the United States Air National Guard

=== June ===
- Boeing KC-97 Stratofreighter by the Texas Air National Guard and Utah Air National Guard
- Douglas TF-10B Skyknight (known as Douglas F3D Skynight before September 1962) by the United States Marine Corps

== Deadliest crash ==
The deadliest crash of this year was Air India Flight 855, a Boeing 747 which crashed into the Arabian Sea just after taking off from Bombay, India on 1 January (New Year's Day), killing all 213 people on board.
