= Snowblind =

Snowblind or Snow Blind may refer to:

- Snow blindness or photokeratitis, a type of temporary eye damage caused by snow reflecting UV light

== Film and television ==
- Snowblind (1921 film), an American film of 1921
- Snow Blind (film), a 2006 American documentary
- Snowblind (film), a 2010 American post-apocalyptic Western
- "Snowblind" (Teen Titans), a 2005 TV episode
- Mortal Kombat Legends: Snow Blind

== Literature ==
- Snowblind (book), a 1976 book by Robert Sabbag about cocaine smuggling
- Snowblind, a 2014 novel by Christopher Golden
- Snow Blind, a 2006 novel by P. J. Tracy

== Songs ==
- "Snowblind" (Styx song), 1981
- "Snowblind", by +/- from Xs on Your Eyes, 2008
- "Snowblind", by the 77s from Drowning with Land in Sight, 1994
- "Snow Blind", by Ace Frehley from Ace Frehley, 1978
- "Snowblind", by Au5 featuring Tasha Baxter, 2014
- "Snowblind", by Black Sabbath from Vol. 4, 1972
- "Snowblind", by Judy Henske and Jerry Yester from Farewell Aldebaran, 1969
- "Snowblind", by Rob Thomas from Cradlesong, 2009
- "Snowblind", by Robbie Williams from Swings Both Ways, 2013
- "Snowblind", by Suede from Bloodsports, 2013
- "Snow Blind", by Susumu Hirasawa from Aurora, 1994
- "Snowblind", by Tanya Tagaq from Toothsayer, 2019
- "Snowblind", by Tori Amos from Night of Hunters, 2011

== Video games ==
- Snowblind Studios, an American video game developer
- Snowblind Map Pack, an add-on for the video game Gears of War 2

== Other ==
- Snow-blindness, a form of whitewashing in art

== See also ==
- Project: Snowblind, a 2005 video game
