= Jo D. Jonz =

American actor

- Born: Joseph Christopher Jones; New York City, New York
- Occupations: Actor; director; writer; producer
- Years active: 1978–present
- Website: www.jodjonz.com

Joseph Christopher Jones, known professionally as Jo D. Jonz, is an American actor, writer, director, and film producer.

== Career ==
=== Early career ===
Jonz was born in New York City. His first acting role was in the play Medea, at the Borough of Manhattan Community College, at age nine.

=== Education ===
After he graduated from Humanities High School, Jonz performed in Off-Broadway productions of Shakespeare's Twelfth Night. Jonz relocated to Los Angeles and attended the American Academy of Dramatic Arts, later the University of Massachusetts Amherst, where he graduated with a double major in Theater and Anthropology. While he was there, he joined the Five College Theatre Arts program and toured Smith College, Hampshire College, Amherst College and Mt. Holyoke College.

=== Professional career ===
Shortly after, Jonz was cast in Charles S. Dutton's directorial debut film, First Time Felon. He also appeared in many television series including ER, NYPD Blue, Cold Case, and Criminal Minds. During this time he went on to write, direct, and star in the play Negritude.

Jonz produced a play, Jungle Kings, and appeared in the films Next Day Air and Midnight Son.

== Filmography ==
Year	Title	Role	Notes
1997	First Time Felon	Pookie	
1998	ER	Belinski	Episode: "Of Past Regret and Future Fear"
1998	Kings		Short
1999	Pacific Blue	Red Dog	Episode: "The Right Thing"
2000	Deadlocked	Demond Doyle	TV movie
2002	Book of Love	Mark	
2002	The Division	John Hays	Episode: "Beyond the Grave"
2002	The Guardian	Tof	Episode: "Lawyers, Guns and Money"
2002	Mello's Kaleidoscope	Poet	Short
2003	Girlfriends	Sticks	Episode: "Single Mama, Drama"
2003	NYPD Blue	Clifton Shaw	Episode: "Off the Wall"
2003	L.A. Dragnet	Sherm	Episode: "17 in 6"
2004	Monk	Ball Playing Inmate	Episode: "Mr. Monk Goes to Jail"
2004	Cold Case	Freddie	Episode: "The Lost Soul of Herman Lester"
2005	Ralph & Stanley	Henry	Short
2009	Blue	Deacon	
2009	Next Day Air	Wade	
2009	Criminal Minds	Dan Osborne	Episode: "Hopeless"
2011	Midnight Son	Marcus	
2015	John of God the Movie	Brandon	
