= First Time Felon =

- Film poster
- Genre: Drama
- Written by: Daniel Therriault
- Directed by: Charles S. Dutton
- Starring: Omar Epps; Delroy Lindo; Rachel Ticotin; Justin Pierce; Treach; William Forsythe
- Music by: Joseph Vitarelli
- Country of origin: United States
- Original language: English

Production
- Executive producer: Paula Weinstein
- Producer: Len Amato
- Cinematography: Jeffrey Jur
- Editor: Anthony Sherin
- Running time: 110 minutes
- Production companies: Spring Creek Productions; HBO NYC

Original release
- Network: HBO
- Release: September 6, 1997

First Time Felon is a 1997 American drama television film directed by Charles S. Dutton, written by Daniel Therriault, and starring Omar Epps and Delroy Lindo. Based on actual events, the film is about Greg Yance (Epps), a young drug dealer and first-time offender facing a five-year prison sentence with no parole. He is offered an alternate sentence of 120 days in a grueling boot camp headed by Sgt. Calhoun (Lindo). Rachel Ticotin, Justin Pierce, Treach, and William Forsythe also star.

First Time Felon aired on HBO on September 6, 1997.

== Plot ==
A young inexperienced drug dealer and Vice Lords gang member, Greg Yance, is arrested for drug possession in his hometown, Chicago. Because of Yance having five grams of drugs under his belt at the time of arrest, he is facing a five-year prison sentence with no parole for drug trafficking. Because it is his first offense, he is offered an alternate sentence of 120 days in an intensive boot camp.

Throughout the boot camp, an experienced drill sergeant, Sergeant Calhoun, continues pressuring Yance to follow through with the camp. Sergeant Calhoun's brutal methods breed resentment in Yance and other inmates.

== Cast ==
- Omar Epps as Greg Yance
- Delroy Lindo as Sergeant Calhoun
- Lucinda Jenney as Sharon
- Rachel Ticotin as McBride
- William Forsythe as Sorley
- Jo D. Jonz as "Pookie"
- Treach as Tyrone
- Pepa as Laverne
- Justin Pierce as Eddie
- Gary Anthony Williams as Wallace
- Badja Djola as Disciple Leader
- Robin Michelle McClamb as Greg's Mother (credited as Robin Vaughn)
- Tom Nowicki as Hogan
- Kristen Jones as Crystal
- Ed Grady as Johnny, The Farmer
- Deborah Hobart as Annie Hill
- Johnell Gainey as Nine
- K. Addison Young as Wolf
- Roger Ranney as Guardsman Jones
- Charles S. Dutton as Inmate
- Clifton Powell as King

== Production ==
Filming took place in New York City, Green Cove Springs, Florida, and Jacksonville, Florida.

== See also ==
- List of hood films
