= North Central Airlines =

Airline of the United States (1944–1979)

IATA	ICAO	Call sign
NC	NC	NORTH CENTRAL
- Founded: 1944 (as Wisconsin Central Airlines)
- Commenced operations: 1952 (as North Central Airlines)
- Ceased operations: July 1, 1979 (merged with Southern Airways to become Republic Airlines)
- Hubs: Chicago–O'Hare; Detroit; Milwaukee; Minneapolis/St. Paul
- Headquarters: Clintonville, Wisconsin (1944–1947); Madison, Wisconsin (1947–1952); Minneapolis, Minnesota (1952–1979)
- Key people: Francis Higgins (President); Hal Carr (Vice President)

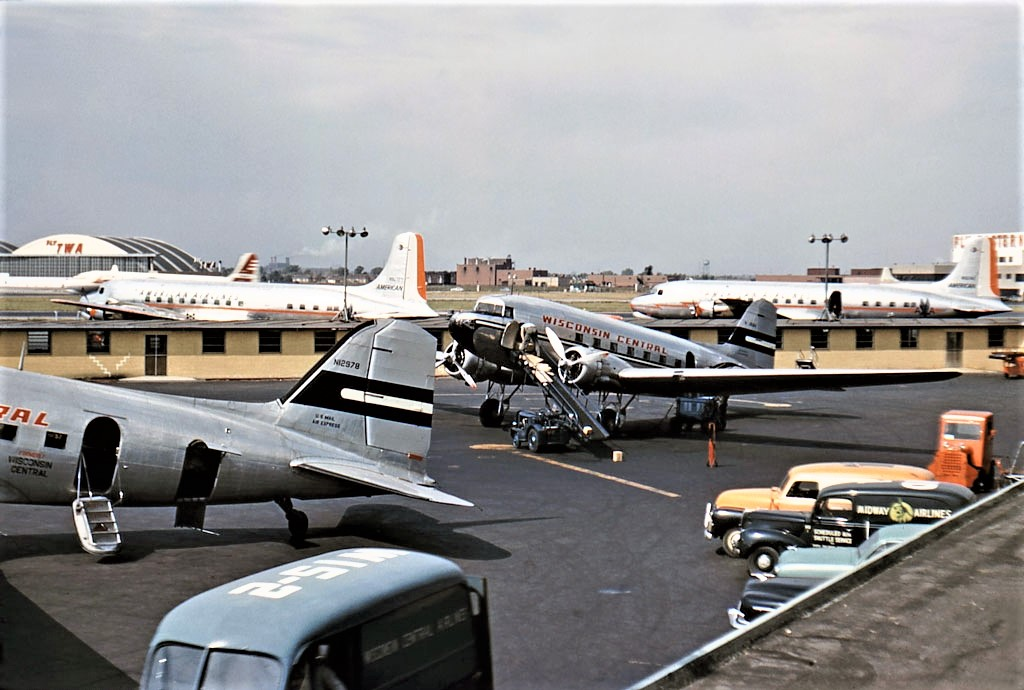
Wisconsin Central Airlines Douglas DC-3

North Central Airlines was a local service carrier, a scheduled airline in the Midwestern United States. Founded as Wisconsin Central Airlines in 1944 in Clintonville, Wisconsin, the company moved to Madison in 1947. This is also when the "Herman the duck" logo was born on Wisconsin Central's first Lockheed Electra 10A, NC14262, in 1948. North Central's headquarters were moved to Minneapolis–St. Paul in 1952.

Following a merger with Southern Airways in 1979, North Central became Republic Airlines, which in turn was merged into Northwest Airlines in 1986. Northwest Airlines was then merged into Delta Air Lines in 2010.

== History ==
=== Wisconsin Central Airlines ===
In 1939 the Four Wheel Drive Auto Company (FWD), a major manufacturer of four-wheel transmissions and heavy-duty trucks based in Clintonville, Wisconsin, opened a flight department and traded a company truck for a Waco biplane for their company's use. In 1944 company executives decided to start an airline named Wisconsin Central Airlines, and service started among six Wisconsin cities in 1946. This led the company to buy two Cessna UC-78 Bobcats, and, soon after, three Lockheed Electra 10As. Certificated flights started with Electras to 19 airports on 25 February 1948; more revenue allowed three more Electra 10As, then six Douglas DC-3s.

=== Post-Wisconsin Central history ===
In 1952 the airline moved their headquarters from Madison, Wisconsin to Minneapolis, Minnesota; that December their name became North Central Airlines. Soon the airline ran into financial trouble when President Francis Higgins left, making Hal Carr the president. Carr quickly got the company out of debt and made it more reliable. Over time the company expanded their fleet to 32 DC-3s.

=== A growing airline ===
Revenue passenger traffic, in millions of passenger-miles (scheduled flights only)

Year	Pax-Miles
1951	15
1955	67
1960	169
1965	268
1970	778
1975	1029

In October 1952 Wisconsin Central scheduled flights to 28 airports, all west of Lake Michigan, from Chicago to Fargo and Grand Forks. It added Detroit in 1953, Omaha, and the Dakotas in 1959, Denver in 1969, and nonstop flights from Milwaukee to New York LaGuardia in 1970. It added five Convair 340s from Continental Airlines to its fleet of DC-3s, the first ones entering service in 1959. In 1960 North Central hit the one million passenger mark; in May 1968, it flew to 64 airports, including two in Canada. Turbine flights with Convair 580 turboprops began in April 1967. The airline then initiated jet service 160 days later with new McDonnell Douglas DC-9 series 30 aircraft in September 1967.

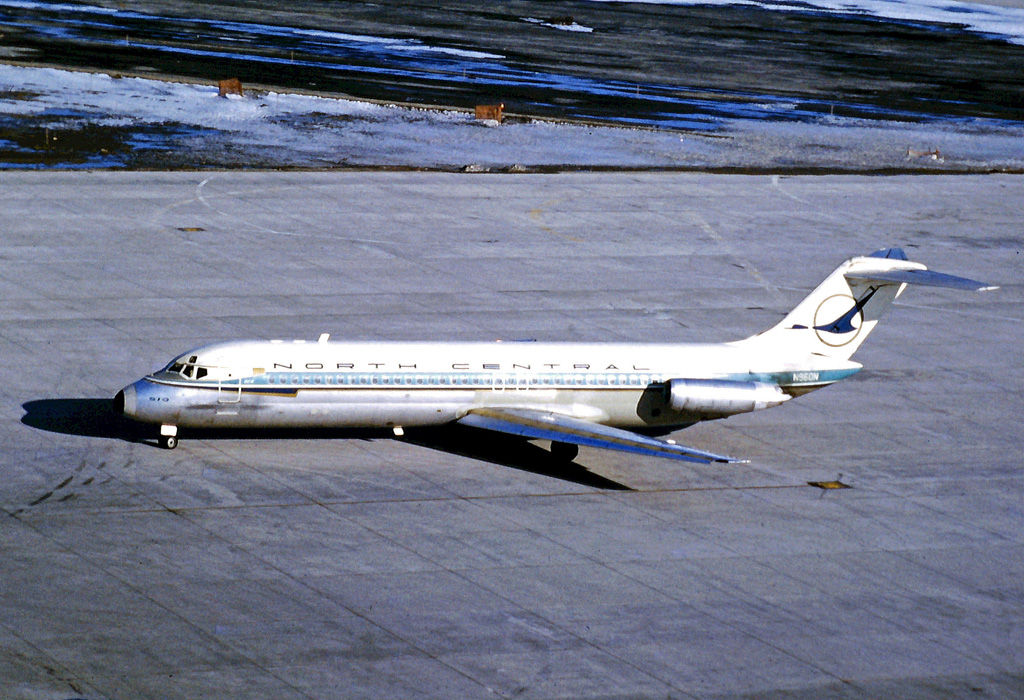
North Central DC-9-31 at Toronto's Malton Airport in 1971

Like other local service airlines, North Central was subsidized; in 1962 its "revenue" of $27.2 million included $8.5 million "Pub. serv. rev."

The airline worked with the U.S. government to aid troubled airlines in South America. The first of five Douglas DC-9-31s entered service in September 1967 and the piston-powered Convair 340s and Convair 440s were all converted to Convair 580s with turboprop engines; the airline also acquired more DC-9s and was operating 29 Convair 580s. The last DC-3 flight was early 1969; NC was the last local service carrier to use it.

In 1969 North Central Airlines moved its headquarters to the south side of Minneapolis-St. Paul International Airport; in 2009 the building was the Building C Maintenance and Administrative Facility of Northwest Airlines. It is now used by Delta Air Lines after its 2008 merger with Northwest.

The Civil Aeronautics Board (CAB) classified North Central as a "local service carrier," flying to cities in one region and feeding passengers to larger "trunk airlines" that flew nationwide. North Central eventually was allowed a few routes outside the Midwest: to Washington, D.C.-National, New York-LaGuardia, Boston, Denver, and Tucson. After deregulation of the airline industry, North Central expanded and began operating McDonnell Douglas DC-9-50s, its largest jet aircraft type.

=== Mergers ===
North Central purchased Atlanta-based Southern Airways and the two airlines formed Republic Airlines in July 1979, the first merger following airline deregulation. Republic soon targeted San Francisco-based Hughes Airwest for acquisition, and the deal was finalized in October 1980 for $38.5 million. Saddled with debt from two acquisitions and new aircraft, the airline struggled in the early 1980s, and even introduced a human mascot version of Herman the Duck.

Republic kept North Central's hubs at Detroit and Minneapolis, and Southern's hub at Memphis. Within a few years, they closed the former Hughes Airwest hub at Phoenix and also largely dismantled the Hughes Airwest route network in the western U.S.; they also reduced North Central's sizeable station at Chicago-O'Hare. Southern's sizeable station was also reduced at Hartsfield at Atlanta. Republic also quickly downsized North Central's operations to and among smaller airports in the upper Midwest, concentrating their fleet at the Detroit and Minneapolis hubs.

In 1986, Republic merged with Northwest Orient Airlines, which was also headquartered at Minneapolis and had a large operation at Detroit, which ended the legacy of Wisconsin Central and North Central. Following the merger, the new airline became Northwest Airlines (dropping the "Orient"), which merged into Delta Air Lines in 2008. Once the merger was finalized in early 2010, the Northwest Airlines brand fully retired with the Delta Air Lines name surviving as the successor to North Central Airlines.

=== Codes ===
When North Central Airlines started operations, the company's ICAO code was "NOR"; this was later changed to "NCA". When ICAO went from three to two characters, North Central became "NC", the same as its IATA code.

=== Destinations in June 1979 ===
According to its June 8, 1979 system timetable, North Central was operating 130-passenger seat McDonnell Douglas DC-9-50 and 100-passenger seat McDonnell Douglas DC-9-30 jets as well as 48-passenger seat Convair 580 turboprops with service to the following destinations in the U.S. and Canada shortly before the acquisition of and merger with Southern Airways was completed thus resulting in the formation of Republic Airlines in July 1979:

Domestic U.S. destinations

- Aberdeen, South Dakota (ABR)
- Alpena, Michigan (APN)
- Atlanta, Georgia (ATL)
- Baltimore, Maryland (BWI)
- Beloit / Janesville, Wisconsin (JVL)
- Bemidji, Minnesota (BJI)
- Benton Harbor / St. Joseph, Michigan (BEH)
- Bismarck / Mandan, North Dakota (BIS)
- Boston, Massachusetts (BOS)
- Brainerd, Minnesota (BRD)
- Brookings, South Dakota (BKX)
- Chicago, Illinois - O'Hare Airport (ORD) - hub
- Cincinnati, Ohio (CVG)
- Cleveland, Ohio (CLE)
- Columbus, Ohio (CMH)
- Dayton, Ohio (DAY)
- Denver, Colorado (DEN)
- Detroit, Michigan (DTW) - hub
- Devils Lake, North Dakota (DVL)
- Duluth, Minnesota / Superior, Wisconsin (DLH)
- Eau Claire, Wisconsin (EAU)
- Escanaba, Michigan (ESC)
- Fairmont, Minnesota (FRM)
- Fargo, North Dakota / Moorhead, Minnesota (FAR)
- Flint, Michigan (FNT)
- Fort Lauderdale, Florida (FLL)
- Grand Forks, North Dakota (GFK)
- Grand Rapids, Michigan (GRR)
- Green Bay, Wisconsin / Clintonville, Wisconsin (GRB)
- Hancock / Houghton, Michigan (CMX)
- Hibbing / Chisholm, Minnesota (HIB)
- Houston, Texas - Intercontinental Airport (IAH)
- Huron, South Dakota (HON)
- International Falls, Minnesota (INL)
- Iron Mountain, Michigan / Kingsford, Michigan (IMT)
- Ironwood, Michigan / Ashland, Wisconsin (IWD)
- Jackson, Michigan (JXN)
- Kalamazoo, Michigan / Battle Creek, Michigan (AZO)
- Kansas City, Missouri (MCI)
- La Crosse, Wisconsin (LSE)
- Lansing, Michigan (LAN)
- Madison, Wisconsin (MSN)
- Manistee, Michigan / Ludington, Michigan (MBL)
- Manitowoc, Wisconsin (MTW)
- Mankato, Minnesota (MKT)
- Marquette, Michigan (MQT)
- Menominee, Michigan / Marinette, Wisconsin (MNM)
- Miami, Florida (MIA)
- Milwaukee, Wisconsin (MKE) - hub
- Minneapolis / St. Paul, Minnesota (MSP) - hub & headquarters
- Minot, North Dakota (MOT)
- Mitchell, South Dakota (MHE)
- Muskegon, Michigan (MKG)
- New York City, New York - LaGuardia Airport (LGA)
- Norfolk, Nebraska (OFK)
- Omaha, Nebraska (OMA)
- Oshkosh, Wisconsin (OSH)
- Pellston, Michigan (PLN)
- Philadelphia, Pennsylvania (PHL)
- Pierre, South Dakota (PIR)
- Rapid City, South Dakota (RAP)
- Rhinelander / Land O'Lakes, Wisconsin (RHI)
- Rochester, Minnesota (RST)
- Saginaw / Bay City / Midland, Michigan (MBS)
- Sarasota / Bradenton, Florida (SRQ)
- Sault Ste. Marie, Michigan (CIU)
- Sioux City, IA (SUX)
- Sioux Falls, South Dakota (FSD)
- South Bend, Indiana (SBN)
- Syracuse, New York (SYR)
- Tampa / St. Petersburg, Florida (TPA)
- Thief River Falls, Minnesota (TVF)
- Traverse City, Michigan (TVC)
- Tucson, Arizona (TUS)
- Washington, DC - National Airport (DCA)
- Watertown, South Dakota (ATY)
- Wausau / Stevens Point, Wisconsin (CWA)
- West Palm Beach, Florida (PBI)
- Worthington, Minnesota (OTG)
- Yankton, South Dakota (YKN)

Canadian destinations

- Thunder Bay, Ontario (YQT)
- Toronto, Ontario (YYZ)
- Winnipeg, Manitoba (YWG)

According to the route map in the aforementioned June 8, 1979 system timetable, North Central's network stretched from as far west as Tucson to as far east as Boston and as far north as Winnipeg to as far south as Miami with such cities as Atlanta, Baltimore, Chicago, Cincinnati, Cleveland, Denver, Detroit, Fort Lauderdale, Houston, Kansas City, Milwaukee, Minneapolis/St. Paul, New York City, Omaha, Philadelphia, Syracuse, Tampa, Toronto and Washington D.C. also being served at this time.

== Fleet ==
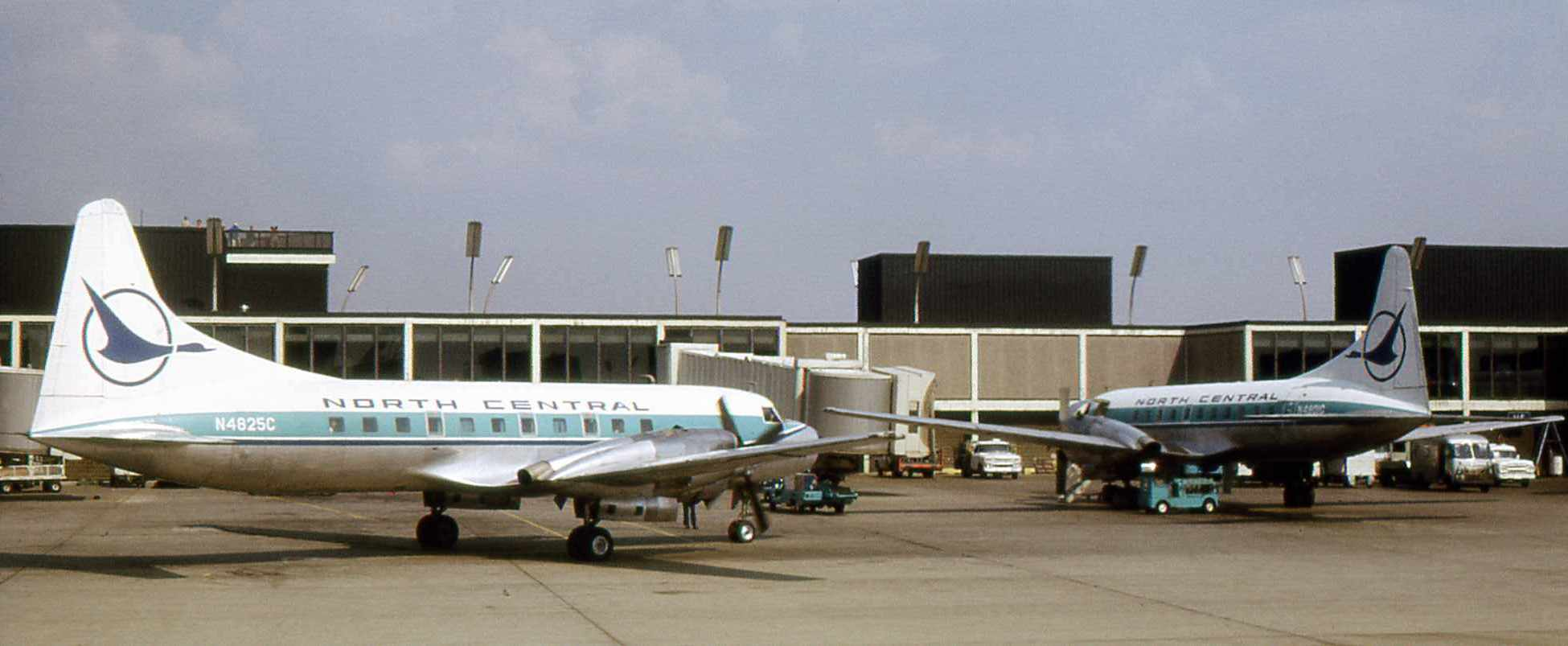
Two North Central CV-580 aircraft at Chicago's O'Hare Airport in 1973

North Central Airlines historical fleet
Aircraft	Total	Introduced	Retired	Remark
Cessna UC-78 Bobcat	2	1946	1946	NC51401, NC63662 operated by Wisconsin Central Airlines
Lockheed Model 10 Electra	6	1948	1951	operated by Wisconsin Central Airlines
Douglas DC-3	32	1951	1969
Convair CV-340 / Convair CV-440	34	1959	1969	32 aircraft were converted to Convair CV-580
Convair CV-580	35	1967	1979
McDonnell Douglas DC-9-31	22	1967	1979
McDonnell Douglas DC-9-51	19	1976	1979

== Accidents and incidents ==
- June 24, 1968: A North Central Airlines plane clipped a guy wire on the 2,032-foot (619 m) tower for KELO-TV (Sioux Falls, South Dakota). The tower in Rowena was in service less than a year and was completely destroyed. Luckily, the plane landed safely with no injuries.
- August 4, 1968: Flight 261, a Convair CV-580, collided with a Cessna 150F 11.5 miles (19 km) southwest of General Mitchell Airport in Milwaukee at 2,700 feet (820 m), as the northbound Convair from Chicago descended for an approach to the airport's runway 7R. The cabin section of the northwest-bound Cessna embedded itself in the Convair's forward baggage compartment. The Convair lost electrical power and the right engine was shut down due to a damaged propeller; the captain completed a successful emergency landing six minutes later. All three teenagers aboard the Cessna were killed and the first officer on the Convair was injured, but the other three crew and eight passengers were uninjured. Heavy insect debris which had accumulated on the Convair's cockpit windshield during the flight was cited as a contributing factor.
- December 27, 1968: Flight 458, a Convair CV-580, crashed into a hangar while attempting to land at O'Hare International Airport at Chicago, Illinois, killing 27 of the 45 people on board and killing one and injuring six people on the ground.
- April 23, 1970: Flight 945, a DC-9 destined for Sault Ste. Marie Airport, was hijacked shortly after departure from Pellston Regional Airport. The hijacker demanded to be taken to Detroit. The hijacker was soon taken down, and there were no fatalities.
- June 29, 1972: All five aboard (three crew, two passengers) Flight 290, a Convair CV-580, were killed when it collided with Air Wisconsin Flight 671, a de Havilland Canada DHC-6 Twin Otter, with eight aboard (two crew, six passengers). Both crashed into the north end of Lake Winnebago, 3 miles (5 km) east of Neenah, Wisconsin, with no survivors from either plane. The collision occurred at 2,500 feet (760 m) on a mostly clear but hazy late morning as 290, two hours late, approached Oshkosh from Green Bay. The Air Wisconsin air taxi flight originated in Chicago and was set to arrive at Appleton from Sheboygan; both were operating under visual flight rules.
- December 20, 1972: Flight 575, a DC-9-31, was cleared by an air traffic controller for takeoff at O'Hare in Chicago, while recently arrived Delta Air Lines Flight 954, a Convair CV-880, was instructed to taxi across the runway to a holding area. The DC-9 had just started to climb in the heavy fog when it clipped the tail of the CV-880. Ten of the 45 people on board the North Central DC-9 were killed in the resulting collision and crash and 15 were injured; there were two minor injuries on the Delta CV-880.
- July 25, 1978: Flight 801 departed the Kalamazoo airport in Michigan at 7:00 am EDT in fog. The Convair 580 struck a bird immediately after lifting off from runway 17 and lost power in its left engine. It flew an additional 79 seconds, banking left, then crash-landed into a cornfield east of the airport. Of the 40 passengers and three crew on board, two passengers and a crewman had serious injuries, but there were no fatalities. The NTSB report attributed the cause of the crash to the captain's failure to follow proper emergency procedures.

== See also ==
- List of defunct airlines of the United States

== Bibliography ==
- Serling, R.J., Ceiling unlimited-The story of North Central Airlines, Walsworth Publishing Co. Inc., Marceline (Missouri), 1973
- Gradidge, J.M., The Convairliners Story, Air-Britain (Historians) Ltd, 1997 ISBN 0-85130-243-2
