= Witness Protection (film) =

- VHS cover
- Genre: Crime drama
- Based on: "The Invisible Family" by Robert Sabbag
- Teleplay by: Daniel Therriault
- Story by: Daniel Therriault; Robert Sabbag
- Directed by: Richard Pearce
- Starring: Tom Sizemore; Mary Elizabeth Mastrantonio; Forest Whitaker; Shawn Hatosy; Skye McCole Bartusiak
- Music by: Cliff Eidelman
- Country of origin: United States
- Original language: English

Production
- Executive producer: Henry Schleiff
- Producer: Howard Meltzer
- Cinematography: Fred Murphy
- Editor: Lisa Fruchtman
- Running time: 105 minutes
- Production companies: HBO NYC Productions; TurtleBack Productions

Original release
- Network: HBO
- Release: December 11, 1999

Witness Protection is a 1999 American crime drama television film directed by Richard Pearce and starring Tom Sizemore, Mary Elizabeth Mastrantonio, Forest Whitaker, Shawn Hatosy, and Skye McCole Bartusiak. The teleplay by Daniel Therriault is based on a 1996 New York Times Magazine article entitled "The Invisible Family" by Robert Sabbag. It was broadcast by HBO on December 11, 1999.

== Plot synopsis ==
South Boston career criminal Bobby "Bats" Batton, facing execution by his partner in crime, Theo Cruise, a Charlestown mobster, whom the FBI wants behind bars for a double murder, is offered a deal by the feds: immunity from prosecution for several serious crimes in exchange for testimony against Cruise, after which he and his family will join the Federal Witness Protection Program.

Batton accepts the offer, and he, his wife Cindy, his Harvard-bound son Sean, and young daughter Suzie spend five days with U.S. Marshal Steve Beck, who coaches them in their new identities in preparation for their relocation to Seattle.

Trying to cope without money, friends, relatives, pets, possessions, or any semblance of a past existence proves to be more difficult than any of them anticipated. When the family slowly begins to disintegrate under the weight of recriminations and frustration, Bobby wonders if his freedom is worth the sacrifices his loved ones have been forced to make.

== Principal cast ==
- Tom Sizemore as Bobby "Bats" Batton
- Mary Elizabeth Mastrantonio as Cindy Batton
- Forest Whitaker as U.S. Marshal Steve Beck
- Shawn Hatosy as Sean Batton
- Skye McCole Bartusiak as Suzie Batton
- William Sadler as U.S. Attorney Sharp
- Jim Metzler as U.S. Marshal Jim Cutler
- Daniel Zacapa as U.S. Marshal David Ramirez
- Greg Pitts as U.S. Marshal Duffy
- Randy Thompson as U.S. Marshal #1
- Byron Minns as U.S. Marshal #2
- Harrison Young as Mr. O'Connor, Cindy's father
- Joanna Merlin as Mrs. O'Connor, Cindy's mother
- Leon Russom as Reedy
- Greg Lipari as Hit Man
- Richard Portnow as Nikos "The Greek" Stephanos (uncredited)

== Production ==
The film was inspired by Robert Sabbag's article "The Invisible Family", the cover story of the February 11, 1996 issue of The New York Times Magazine. According to Sabbag, "I realized that this was going to be a movie when 11 producers called me the day after it was published."

Filming took place in Los Angeles. The Witness Security Safe Site and Orientation Center, the real-life secret facility in the Washington, D.C., area used by the Witness Protection Program, was re-created on a sound stage at Raleigh Studios.

== Critical reception ==
Caren Weiner Campbell of Entertainment Weekly rated the DVD release a B and added, "With its moody Sopranos vibe, this modest made-for-cable drama begins gracefully but bogs down a bit during the family's orientation, during which Whitaker, as the feds' liaison, gives a performance so subdued he almost seems to be sleepwalking."

== Nominations ==
- Golden Globe Award for Best Miniseries or Television Film
- Golden Globe Award for Best Actor – Miniseries or Television Film (Tom Sizemore)
- Primetime Emmy Award for Outstanding Cinematography for a Miniseries, Movie, or Dramatic Special
