= North Central Airlines Flight 458 =

1968 aviation accident

Coordinates: 41°59′28″N 87°55′20″W

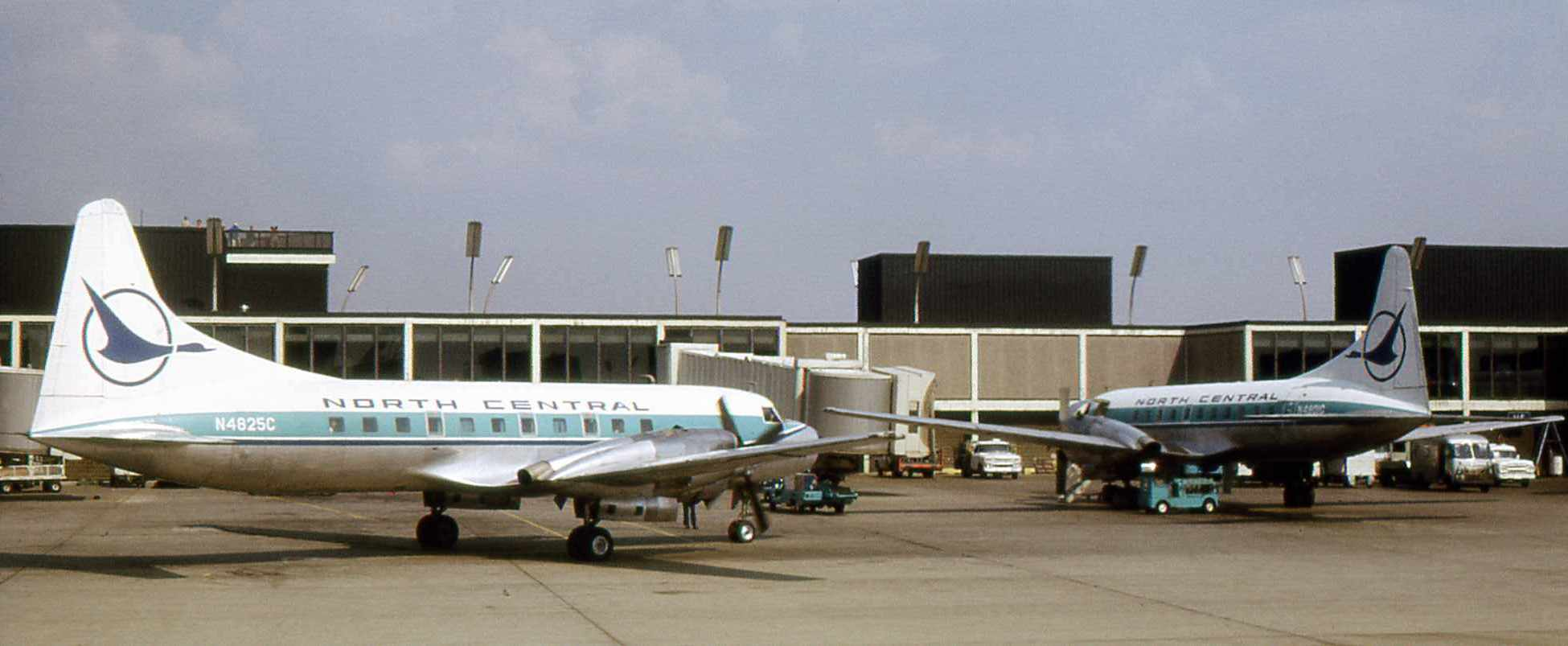
- Two North Central Airlines Convair CV-580s, similar to the accident aircraft, in August 1973 at O'Hare International Airport in Chicago, Illinois.

Accident
- Date: December 27, 1968
- Summary: Pilot error; spatial disorientation as a contributing factor
- Site: O'Hare International Airport, Chicago, Illinois, United States
- Total fatalities: 28
- Total injuries: 24

Aircraft
- Aircraft type: Convair CV-580
- Operator: North Central Airlines
- Registration: N2045
- Flight origin: Minneapolis, Minnesota
- Last stopover: General Mitchell International Airport, Milwaukee, Wisconsin
- Destination: O'Hare International Airport, Chicago, Illinois
- Occupants: 45
- Passengers: 41
- Crew: 4
- Fatalities: 27
- Injuries: 18
- Survivors: 18

Ground casualties
- Ground fatalities: 1
- Ground injuries: 6

On December 27, 1968, North Central Airlines Flight 458 crashed into a hangar while attempting a night landing in poor weather at O'Hare International Airport in Chicago, Illinois, in the United States. Of the 41 passengers and four crew members, only 17 passengers and one crew member survived. One person was killed and six were injured on the ground.

== Flight history ==
Flight 458 was a regularly scheduled flight that originated in Minneapolis, Minnesota, and stopped at Wausau, Green Bay, Manitowoc and Milwaukee, Wisconsin before terminating at O'Hare International Airport in Chicago, Illinois. On December 27, 1968, the flight left Minneapolis on schedule at 4:15 p.m. Central Standard Time, (Note: All times provided are based on those given in the NTSB's final report, which are in Central Standard Time.) and made its intermediate stops without incident. However, delays caused by weather and baggage handling meant that by the time the plane departed General Mitchell International Airport in Milwaukee at 7:48 p.m. CST for the final leg of its flight to Chicago, it was running 62 minutes behind schedule.

At 8:14 p.m. CST, the aircraft began its approach to O'Hare, which had a 200-foot (61 m) ceiling with light rain and fog, and runway visibility varying from 2,800 to 4,500 feet (850 to 1,370 m). The plane made a normal approach, and at 8:20 p.m. CST, it was cleared to land on Runway 14R. (Note: O'Hare's Runway 14R/32L was redesignated Runway 15/33 in September 2016, and then closed and converted into Taxiway SS in 2018.) The flight crew acknowledged the clearance message; it was the last communication with Flight 458.

The approach continued normally until about 4,500 feet (1,370 m) from the threshold of the runway, when from an altitude of about 210 feet (60 m), the CV-580 began a sustained climb for 11 seconds, after which the captain initiated a go-around procedure. However, the aircraft instead continued to climb; witnesses reported that the engines were running at a high throttle setting and that the aircraft rolled left and right two or three times during this time period. Flight 458 lost speed until it stalled 13 seconds after the initiation of the go-around. The aircraft entered a steep left bank, and its left wing struck the ground about 100 feet (30 m) from a hangar located 1,600 feet (490 meters) to the left of the runway. At 8:22:23 p.m. CST, the plane, now nearly inverted, struck the main door of the hangar with its left wing and crashed into the hangar bay.

== Aircraft ==
The aircraft involved was a Convair CV-580 (registration N2045), c/n 369, which Convair had completed as a CV-440 Metropolitan on October 8, 1956. It was converted to a standard CV-580 in July 1968. As a CV-580, it entered service with North Central Airlines on August 9, 1968. The crash destroyed the aircraft.

== Casualties ==
Three crew members – the captain, the first officer and a flight attendant – and 24 passengers died in the crash. One crew member (a flight attendant) and 17 passengers survived, all with injuries. Several airline employees, as well as members of a boys' drum and bugle corps group named the Des Plaines Vanguard, were on the ground in the vicinity of the hangar or in the hangar bay at the time of the crash; none of the airline employees were harmed, but seven of the boys were injured, and one of them died nine days later.

== Investigation ==
The National Transportation Safety Board conducted an investigation of the accident that lasted almost 23 months. Its report, released on November 12, 1970, blamed the crash on "Spatial disorientation of the captain precipitated by atmospheric refraction of either the approach lights or landing lights at a critical point in the approach wherein the crew was transitioning between flying by reference to flight instruments and by visual reference to the ground."

The NTSB noted that the captain of Flight 458, although experienced, had relatively few hours of experience as the pilot-in-command in CV-580s and that a captain more experienced with the CV-580 might have recognized the growing danger of a stall sooner and avoided the crash. It recommended that Federal Aviation Administration regulations be amended to require pilots to have more flying hours and landing experience in a given type of aircraft before being released from "high minima" landing requirements when serving as pilot-in-command in that type.
