= Daniel Therriault =

American playwright and actor (born 1953)

- Born: 1953 (age 72–73); Chicago, Illinois, U.S.
- Occupations: Playwright, screenwriter, actor
- Spouse: Alison Mackenzie
- Children: Devin Therriault; Quinn Therriault
- Writing career
- Period: 1977–present
- Genre: Fiction
- Notable works: Battery (1981); First Time Felon (1997); Witness Protection (1999)

Daniel Therriault (born 1953) is an American playwright, screenwriter and actor. He wrote the stage play Battery and the HBO films First Time Felon and Witness Protection.

== Early life ==
Therriault was born and raised in Chicago, Illinois. Since 1978, he has been based in New York City.

== Career ==
=== Theatre ===
As an actor in Chicago's off-Loop theatre movement in the 1970s, Therriault was nominated for a 1977 Jeff Award for Best Actor in a Principal Role for Who's Happy Now? at the Body Politic Theatre. He portrayed Mercutio in the Oak Park Festival Theatre's open-air production of Romeo and Juliet in 1977, and did seasons at the Alley Theatre in Houston, Texas, in 1976–77, and at the Milwaukee Repertory Theater in 1977–78. After relocating to New York City, he performed in The Mad Dog Blues at Shep in Rep Rock N' Roll Theatre in 1979.

Around 1980, Therriault started writing. His first effort was the three-character stage play Battery, a black comedy set in Chicago that would go on to win six Drama-Logue Awards. The play depicts domineering electrician Rip, who manipulates the lives of his girlfriend Brandy and manic-depressive apprentice Stan. Its off-Broadway run at St. Clements in Manhattan in 1981 was the professional stage debut of actress Holly Hunter, who would go on to win the Academy Award for Best Actress for The Piano. The play was also produced by The Actors' Gang at Second Stage in Los Angeles in 1986 and 1989, directed by Richard Olivier and produced by Tim Robbins and Meg Ryan. Other productions include the Cast Theatre in Los Angeles starring LeVar Burton in 1983, Minnesota in 1986, Staatstheater Braunschweig in Germany in 1988–89, the Edinburgh Festival in Scotland in 1989, and Red Bones Theatre in Chicago in 1991. It was developed for the screen by Tony Richardson and Richard Olivier, but was never produced as a film. A 1986 Los Angeles Times review called Therriault's dialogue "a ripe blend of primitive slang and advanced metaphor."

His second full-length play, The White Death, premiered at Kawaiahao Hall Theatre in Hawaii in 1986, and opened at the Cast Theatre in Los Angeles in 1987. Based in Hawaii, The White Death is a murder mystery in which a priest is sent to Hawaii to investigate a murder connected with his church. The Honolulu Advertiser deemed it "a controversial play dealing with sex, violence and God."

Therriault's one-act Floor Above the Roof was completed in 1981 and premiered in Chicago in 1987 as part of the Great Chicago Playwrights Exposition at the Body Politic Theatre. It was performed in 1989 as one of four one-act plays in the Working Theatre's Working One-Acts '89 at the Henry Street Settlement Arts for Living Center in New York City. Revolving around four laborers in a Manhattan warehouse, the play is concerned with "how men deal with their hunger for women."

Therriault is an alumnus of New Dramatists, and received a 1991 McKnight Foundation Artist Fellowship and residency at the Playwrights' Center in Minneapolis.

=== Radio ===
Therriault's 1992 radio play The Hitch, "a darkly comic road adventure," was chosen to initiate Marjorie Van Halteren's new Radio Stage series on WNYC. It is a re-telling of an autobiographical event where Therriault was hitchhiking with a female friend, and a driver tried to kill him and rape her. In 2002, it was translated and broadcast on the German public-broadcasting radio station Westdeutscher Rundfunk. His radio play Romance Concerto, about a concert violinist haunted by the memory of lost love, was performed on WNYC in April 1995.

=== Television ===
Therriault wrote the script for the 1997 HBO film First Time Felon, starring Omar Epps and Delroy Lindo, and directed by Charles S. Dutton. It tells the story of a young African-American's trials as a first-time convict. He wrote the screenplay for the 1999 HBO film Witness Protection, starring Tom Sizemore as a mobster who tries to save himself by confessing to the FBI, with Mary Elizabeth Mastrantonio as his wife and Forest Whitaker as a US Marshal, and directed by Richard Pearce. Witness Protection was nominated for a Golden Globe Award for Best Miniseries or Television Film, and Sizemore was nominated for a Golden Globe Award for Best Actor in a Miniseries or Television Film.

== Personal life ==
Therriault is married to Alison Mackenzie, a former stage director. They met in the late 1970s when she cast him as the writer Euripides in the play October 12, 410 B.C., which she was directing at SoHo Rep in New York City.

From 2013 to 2017, he was an adjunct professor in film and television at the New York University Tisch School of the Arts.

== Bibliography ==
- Battery (Broadway Play Publishing, 1983)
- Floor Above the Roof (Broadway Play Publishing, 1984)
- Solo!: The Best Monologues of the 80's (ed. Michael Earley and Philippa Keil, Applause Theatre Book Publishers, 1987, pp. 32–34) – includes monologue from Battery
- Anti-Naturalism: Six Full-Length Contemporary American Plays (Broadway Play Publishing, 1989) – includes The White Death
- 100 Monologues: An Audition Sourcebook from New Dramatists (ed. Laura Harrington, Penguin, 1989) – includes Battery, Floor Above the Roof and The White Death

== Works ==
Playwright

- Battery (1981)
- Floor Above the Roof (1984)
- The White Death (1987)
- Theresa (1991)

Radio writer

- The Hitch (1992)
- Romance Concerto (1995)

TV writer

- First Time Felon (1997)
- Witness Protection (1999)
