= Midnight Son =

- Theatrical release poster
- Directed by: Scott Leberecht
- Written by: Scott Leberecht
- Produced by: Matt Compton
- Starring: Zak Kilberg; Maya Parish; Larry Cedar
- Cinematography: Lyn Moncrief
- Edited by: Ian McCamey
- Music by: Kays Al-Atrakchi; Geoff Levin
- Production company: Free Lunch Productions
- Distributed by: FEARnet; Image Entertainment
- Release date: March 4, 2011 (Cinequest)
- Running time: 88 minutes
- Country: United States
- Language: English

Midnight Son is a 2011 vampire horror film written and directed by Scott Leberecht, produced by Matt Compton, and starring Zak Kilberg. A trailer was released in late October 2010.

== Plot ==
Jacob (Zak Kilberg) is a young man in Los Angeles, California who lives a life of isolation by day and works as a security guard by night. This is due to a rare skin disorder developed in his youth that prevents him from being exposed to sunlight. His world opens up when he meets and falls in love with a local bartender and secret druggie, Mary (Maya Parish), recently departing a relationship with a drug dealer. Beginning to crave blood, as everyday food no longer cures his hunger, Jacob suspects he may be a vampire, though his physician, Dr. Barnes (Kevin McCorkle), diagnoses him to be anemic. His condition worsens and he goes from consuming animal blood to depending on human blood for medical sustenance, a necessity which brings out his violent tendencies on people in the city.

Jacob, longing to be normal, hides his deteriorating condition from Mary, and their romantic relationship suffers because of it. Searching for blood at a hospital, Jacob comes in contact with an immoral hospital physician named Marcus (Jo D. Jonz), who alongside his younger, misguided brother, Russell (Arlen Escarpeta), helps Jacob by milking a patient for blood in exchange for money, a grim method Jacob is against. Shortly, Detective Ginslegh (Larry Cedar) narrows his focus on Jacob during a homicide investigation.

While on security one night, Jacob assaults a disobedient man, resulting in his job termination. Fascinated with Jacob’s paintings and attempting to help him monetize it, Mary interests her friend, Liz (Juanita Jennings), who works at an art gallery. However, his relationship with Mary, suspicious there is more complications to his health, falls apart. In desperation, Jacob approaches Marcus to help him get more blood, but Marcus turns him down for initially opposing his actions. After Marcus hits him, Jacob lashes back and causes Marcus an injury on broken glass, leaving him to bleed heavily.

Jacob reconciles with Mary, confessing to her he is suffering from severe anemia, which plays a role in his skin sensitivity. When they decide to ditch a party at the gallery, Russell tracks and follows them to a quiet location, shooting Mary to avenge his missing brother who he believes Jacob killed. Jacob is able to retrieve the gun and scare him away. He sucks the bullet out of Mary’s chest and soon realizes he passed on his contagious case of anemia to her. Jacob keeps her isolated in his home and not wanting to harm Mary, attempts to convince Detective Ginslegh that he infected and killed the girl in the homicide case whose body burned during sunrise, but there is mysteriously no evidence for an arrest.

Jacob finds out Marcus is alive, and he is left with a burn on his face from escaping daylight, after Jacob had sucked his blood, infected him and left him for dead. Morally corrupt, Marcus forces Jacob and Russell to dismember and dump the dead old man’s body they used to extract blood from. After Marcus decides to dump the body instead, they revolt against him, with Russell using a cinderblock to knock Marcus unconscious before running away. Jacob chains Marcus up and leaves him to burn at the break of dawn. He returns home the next night, and Detective Ginslegh follows him there, looking to arrest him for seemingly harming Mary, who starves for blood. In an act of need, Jacob kills Detective Ginslegh, providing blood for him and Mary to feast on. In the end, they kiss and begin their new found life together.

== Cast ==
- Zak Kilberg as Jacob
- Maya Parish as Mary
- Larry Cedar as Detective Ginslegh
- Jo D. Jonz as Marcus
- Kevin McCorkle as Dr. Barnes
- Juanita Jennings as Liz
- Billy Louviere as The Junkie
- Tracey Walter as Janitor

== Critical reception ==
Midnight Son received very positive reviews from critics. Rotten Tomatoes rated the film "Fresh" with 95% of critical reviews being positive.

Philip French of The Observer newspaper said it was "a frightening story, plausibly developed within a relatively brief running time, and the central love between the male protagonist increasingly addicted to blood and a girl addicted to cocaine is oddly moving."

The Daily Telegraph's Robbie Collin stated that "Horror films driven by ideas are thin on the ground, but behind the gory façade of Scott Leberecht's debut feature there ticks some cleverly assembled clockwork."

== See also ==
- Vampire film
