= Next Day Air =

2009 film directed by Benny Boom

- Theatrical release poster
- Directed by: Benny Boom
- Written by: Blair Cobbs
- Produced by: Scott Aronson; Inny Clemons; Michael Williams
- Starring: Donald Faison; Mike Epps; Wood Harris; Omari Hardwick; Darius McCrary; Lauren London; Mos Def
- Cinematography: David A. Armstrong
- Edited by: David Checel
- Music by: The Elements
- Production companies: A-Mark Entertainment; Melee Entertainment; Secret Society Films
- Distributed by: Summit Entertainment
- Release date: May 8, 2009
- Running time: 84 minutes
- Country: United States
- Language: English
- Budget: $3 million
- Box office: $10.2 million

Next Day Air is a 2009 American black comedy film that was released by Summit Entertainment on May 8, 2009. The film starring Donald Faison and Mike Epps was produced on an estimated budget of $3 million. Two criminals accidentally accept a package of cocaine which they must sell before the real owner finds it missing.

== Plot ==
Leo works for Next Day Air (NDA), a package delivery company, where his mother happens to be his boss, but is at risk of getting fired for any more mistakes. While delivering a package addressed to Jesus in apartment 303, Leo accidentally delivers it to apartment 302. Before Leo can leave Jesus asks if Leo has the package and gets worried when he is empty-handed. Guch and Brody, two inept criminals, open the package and find ten bricks of cocaine hidden in a clay pot. Brody remembers that his cousin, Shavoo, has cut cocaine before. Shavoo and his partner, Buddy, come to Guch's apartment and settle on $15,000 a brick.

Bodega, Jesus's boss and original sender of the package, calls to confirm the package was delivered. Jesus tells Bodega it was not delivered even though the tracking information says otherwise. Jesus is concerned that Bodega is going to kill him and assumes that Leo stole the package. While searching Jesus tells Chita that his previous boss was killed by Bodega and Rhino because of a similar situation, which led to Jesus working for him now. Jesus and Chita find Eric, another employee of NDA, who they hold at gunpoint and steal his watch (ironically, Eric stole the watch from a package he was supposed to deliver). Finally realizing that it is not Leo they continue their search.

Shavoo has trouble getting his money from storage because he was robbed by the front desk clerk, Wade. He interrogates the clerk and finds the storage garage where his money and supplies are. Shavoo and Buddy lock the clerk and his accomplice inside a garage, bound and gagged with duct tape.

Bodega surprises Jesus in Philadelphia, to his dismay, and they search for Leo together. Jesus tortures Leo but he can't remember anything. Back at the apartments, Leo is walking down the hallway and finally remembers he delivered it to 302. Bodega forces Leo to request the package back while Guch is inside counting the money. Brody informs Leo that he sent the package back to NDA headquarters. Bodega realizes something strange is going on and forces his way into the apartment. Everyone has their guns drawn, and Guch takes the first shot at Jesus, triggering an intense shootout. Guch, Brody, and Bodega are killed, while Rhino, Bodega's enforcer, stabs Buddy to death before being killed by Shavoo, who was injured by a shotgun blast from Rhino. Afterward, Shavoo limps away, nearly dead; Leo, completely uninjured, jumps up and leaves with the money and a shotgun, which he uses to scare Chita and some tenants. Chita comes to check on Jesus, who is still alive, but wounded. Luckily, he is saved by the watch he took from Eric earlier. Jesus and Chita walk away with the cocaine as sirens can be heard in the background. Later, Hassie, Guch and Brody's unwanted roommate who mostly spent time sleeping on the couch, is seen coming out of the bathroom, having missed the entire incident.

== Cast ==
- Donald Faison as Leo: Faison "campaigned" to get this role almost to the point of begging because he wanted to work with Epps, Harris, and Def.
- Mike Epps as Brody: Epps did not do any improvising because he wanted to show people he did not "have to improv to be in a movie and be funny and do a good job."
- Wood Harris as Guch
- Yasmin Deliz as Chita: Yasmin was a little worried about performing a Santería ritual but was willing to do it after reassurance from her mom that God was on her side.
- Omari Hardwick as Shavoo
- Darius McCrary as Buddy
- Cisco Reyes as Jesus: While auditioning with Yasmin he gave her a spanking to get her out the door and that helped her get the part.
- Emilio Rivera as Bodega
- Lobo Sebastian as Rhino
- Mos Def as Eric
- Lauren London as Ivy
- Debbie Allen as Ms. Jackson
- Cassidy as Cass
- Jo D. Jonz as Wade
- Malik Barnhardt as Hassie
- Christine Lye as Late Night girl

== Production ==
Benny Boom got attached to the project when a friend got him in touch with a producer. He fell in love with the script after reading it and believed he could put his own style on it. He was also attracted to the script because it takes place in his hometown of Philadelphia. Next Day Air was shot in 20 days, which Boom said he was able to do because he already had the film edited in his head. In the audio commentary of the DVD, the director mentions how he forbade the use of the "n" word for on-screen dialogue, and how that element is sometimes incorrectly attributed to Mos Def.

== Reception ==
=== Box office ===
The film opened at #6 on its opening weekend, behind Star Trek, X-Men Origins: Wolverine, Ghosts of Girlfriends Past, Obsessed, and 17 Again with approximately $4 million in revenue. Next Day Air steadily declined in the box office during its eight-week run. The film grossed $10,027,047 ranking it 111 in films released in 2009.

=== Critical response ===
On Rotten Tomatoes the film has an approval rating of 22% based on 65 reviews. The site's consensus was "Rife with half-baked jokes and excessive violence, Next Day Air is an uninspired stoner comedy." On Metacritic the film has a score of 46 out of 100 based on reviews from 20 critics, indicating "mixed or average reviews".

Sam Adams of the Los Angeles Times gave the film a negative review citing the fact that the director could not make up his mind, "whether he wants to make a straight-up crime movie or a tongue-in-cheek riff on the genre, and he lacks the wherewithal to do both at once." He went on to say that the film's plot had enough holes you could drive a delivery truck through." The Boston Globe writer Janice Page thought the film had too many "deep talks" and that "none of these characters provides more than a smattering of laughs."

Roger Ebert gave the film a more positive review stating that Benny Boom "knows what he's doing and skillfully intercuts the story strands." Ebert also wrote that the film has a lot of "dire dialogue" and it is "very sunny" Nathan Lee of The New York Times wrote that Next Day Air had "a script that snaps, characters that pop, a blaze of streetwise attitude." He continued saying the film is "violent and profane but never vulgar or inhuman."

=== Home media ===
Next Day Air was released on September 15, 2009 on DVD. As of November 2009, it had grossed $4,578,713.

== Soundtrack ==
Next Day Air

Soundtrack album by Various Artists
- Released: May 5, 2009
- Length: 53:09
- Label: Melee

Track #	Title	Performer	Length (M:SS)
1	"Philly Cityscape"	The Elements	01:06
2	"Count My Money"	Trick Daddy	03:44
3	"Heat Rocks"	Raekwon	03:58
4	"Get the Tapes"	The Elements	00:41
5	"Sixty Million Dollar Flow"	Glasses Malone	03:55
6	"Honestly"	Kurupt	03:21
7	"In the Life"	Lisa "Left Eye" Lopes	03:45
8	"Videogame"	The Elements	00:51
9	"Blunts & Roses"	Penuckle	04:27
10	"Cerebro Orgasmo Envidia & Sofia"	Martin Buscaglia	04:38
11	"Day Ago"	Spider Loc	03:00
12	"It's Real"	Darius McCrary	04:43
13	"Ave"	The Elements	00:42
14	"Gone Get It"	C-Dash	03:28
15	"Get It How You Live"	5 Grand	04:35
16	"So Fly"	Meek Mill	03:47
17	"Next Day Air"	Prophet	02:28
