= Snowblind (book) =

1976 book by Robert Sabbag

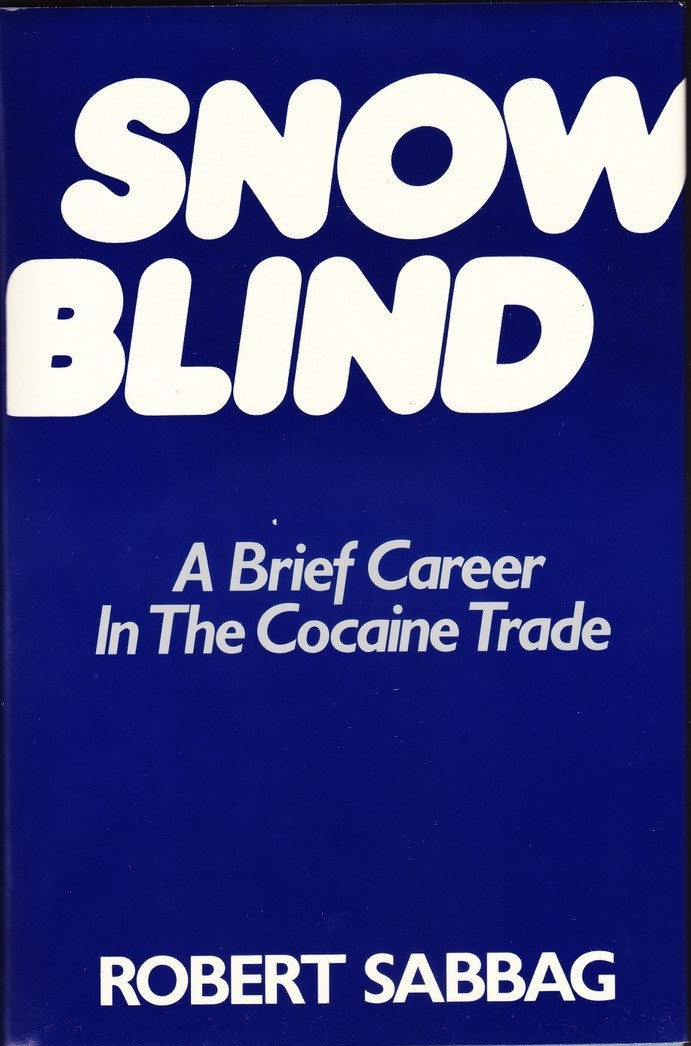
- First-edition hardcover jacket
- Author: Robert Sabbag
- Language: English
- Genre: Narrative nonfiction
- Publisher: Bobbs-Merrill
- Publication date: 1976
- Publication place: United States
- Media type: Print (Hardback & Paperback)
- ISBN: 0-8021-3589-7
- OCLC: 39307412
- Dewey Decimal: 364.1/77 21
- LC Class: HV5810 .S23 1998
- Followed by: Smokescreen

Snowblind: A Brief Career In The Cocaine Trade is a book by American author Robert Sabbag. First published in 1976, the book is a work of literary nonfiction that chronicles the smuggling career of Zachary Swan, who became adept at trafficking cocaine from Colombia into the US in the early 1970s, before organized crime took over the cocaine trade. The events take place primarily in New York City and Bogotá and feature a variety of colorful characters. Unlike other smugglers of that era, Swan concocted a variety of scams designed both to evade customs officials and to protect his accomplices from prosecution.

== Trivia ==
- Howard Marks wrote an introduction for the UK 1998 Canongate reprint.
- Damien Hirst designed a repackaged version limited to 1,000 copies with sleeve, reinforced back-cover mirror, imitation credit card (in the name of Zachary Swan), and a rolled up $100 bill hidden in a hollow cut out of the middle of the book. Sabbag, Marks, and Hirst all signed each book.
- Glenn Frey was tasked with writing a number of songs for a planned movie based on the book; however the best effort that came of it was his hit song 'That Smuggler's Blues!'.
