= Folkestone Warren =

Chalk cliffs in Kent, England

Coordinates: 51.099°N 1.237°E

- Site of Special Scientific Interest
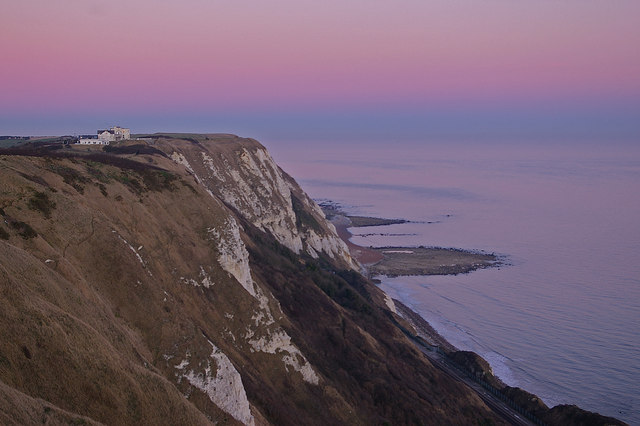
- Location of Folkestone Warren.
- Area of search: Kent
- Grid reference: TR 267 383
- Interest: Biological; Geological
- Area: 316.3 hectares (782 acres)
- Notification date: 1987
- Location map: Magic Map

Folkestone Warren is a 316.3-hectare (782-acre) biological and geological Site of Special Scientific Interest (SSSI) which runs along the coast between Folkestone and Dover in Kent. It is a Nature Conservation Review site and it contains three Geological Conservation Review sites and part of a fourth. An area of 83.6 hectares (207 acres) is a Local Nature Reserve,

These chalk cliffs have several nationally rare plants and they provide a location for cliff nesting and wintering birds. The SSSI also contains two internationally important reference sites for study of the Cretaceous period.
