= Merger of Delta Air Lines and Northwest Airlines =

Airline merger

- Most common symbol for the merger
- Initiator: Delta Air Lines
- Target: Northwest Airlines
- Type: Merger
- Initiated: April 14, 2008
- Completed: October 29, 2008
- Status: Completed

On April 14, 2008, Delta Air Lines and Northwest Airlines announced a merger agreement. The merger of the two carriers formed what was then the largest commercial airline in the world, with 786 aircraft. The Delta Air Lines brand was retained, while Northwest's brand officially ended in 2010.

== Leading up to the announcement ==
It had been reported as early as January 2008 that Delta and Northwest were in merger discussions. News reports covering the event and the official press release reported that the new airline would use the Delta name and have its headquarters in Atlanta. The proposed merger partners lost a combined $10.5 billion in first quarter 2008, an amount that exceeded their combined market capitalization.

When the airlines combined, the "new Delta" would be based in Atlanta, Delta's long-time home. Before the merger, Delta had hubs at Atlanta, New York–JFK, Cincinnati, Salt Lake City, and Los Angeles, while Northwest had hubs at Memphis, Detroit, Minneapolis/St. Paul, and Tokyo–Narita. Northwest also called Amsterdam and Paris–Charles de Gaulle as hubs, but these were joint venture hubs operated by partners KLM and Air France.

Richard Anderson was CEO of Northwest Airlines until 2004, the year before Northwest Airlines declared bankruptcy. Then, in 2007, he became CEO of Delta Air Lines when the merger took place.

== Announcement ==
On April 14, 2008, both Delta and Northwest Airlines announced that they would merge to create the world's largest airline under the Delta name. The Atlanta-based combined airline will have $17.7 billion enterprise value. The company also stated on April 14, 2008, that it agreed with its pilot union to extend the existing collective bargaining agreement through the end of 2012. The agreement, subject to a vote by the pilots, provided Delta pilots a 3.5% equity stake in the created new airline.

== After the announcement ==
On September 26, 2008, it was announced that both Delta and Northwest's shareholders had approved the merger. Approval by a federal antitrust review board was the last step needed to finalize the deal. The proposed merger "is likely to produce substantial and credible efficiencies that will benefit U.S. consumers and is not likely to substantially lessen competition," the Justice Department said in a statement issued by its Antitrust Division.

The deal passed through anti-trust overview from the Department of Justice; as most analysts expected, the deal was not blocked, due to the minimal overlap between the two airlines' routes and very little threat to competition in the industry. The merger was also expected to be the subject of several hearings in the United States Congress. Representative Jim Oberstar of Minnesota, who also serves as chair of the House Committee on Transportation and Infrastructure, made clear his opposition to the merger, and he fought it in Washington. There was also strong support for the merger at the Capitol from legislators from Georgia, including Representative Lynn Westmoreland, Representative David Scott, and Senator Johnny Isakson. On August 7, 2008, the merger got regulatory approval from the European Union.

After a six-month investigation, government economists concluded the merger would likely drive down costs for consumers without curbing competition. On October 29, 2008, the United States Department of Justice approved Delta's plan to acquire Northwest.

Delta and Northwest's operating certificates were merged on December 31, 2009. From a technical standpoint, Northwest then ceased to exist as an independent carrier. Ground operations and reservations systems were combined on January 31, 2010.

== Transition from Northwest to Delta ==
In airports where Northwest and Delta operated in separate terminals, one airline moved to the other's terminal.

In Tampa International Airport, Northwest moved into Delta's Airside E from its previous location in Airside A on April 28, 2009.

In Los Angeles International Airport, Northwest, which had a smaller operation, moved into Delta's Terminals 5 and 6 from its previous location in Terminal 2 on June 30, 2009. (Although between May 12–17, 2017, Delta moved to Terminals 2 and 3, allowing easier transfers to/from the Tom Bradley International Terminal, after subsequent mergers such as Southwest-AirTran and American-US Airways opened up sufficient space in those terminals for Delta.)

At Orlando International Airport, Northwest moved from Airside 3 (Gates 31 to 38) to Airside 4 (Gates 71 to 78) where Delta had a much larger presence and a dedicated terminal. Prior to complete integration in 2010, Northwest operated solely out of gates 72, 74 and 76.

On January 18, 2010, Philadelphia International Airport became the last airport to transition from Northwest to Delta.

Northwest WorldPerks was merged into Delta SkyMiles on October 1, 2009.

While Delta had said during merger talks that it would not close any hubs, over the coming years it would close several. Cincinnati was drawn down by 2013, Memphis closed in 2013, and it pulled out of Tokyo–Narita in 2020.

== The fleet ==
Prior to merging with Northwest Airlines, Delta Air Lines had an all-Boeing (including McDonnell Douglas aircraft) fleet. Northwest operated a mixed fleet of Boeing, McDonnell Douglas, and Airbus aircraft. Northwest was the largest owner and operator of the Airbus A330.

== See also ==
- American Airlines–US Airways merger
- United Airlines–Continental Airlines merger
