= Air New England Flight 248 =

1979 aviation accident

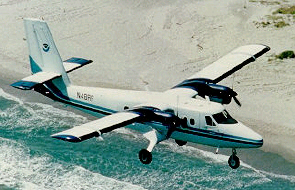
- A Twin Otter similar to the accident aircraft

Occurrence
- Date: June 17, 1979
- Summary: CFIT
- Site: Camp Greenough, Yarmouth Port, Yarmouth, Massachusetts, United States; 41°41′25.62″N 70°14′30.95″W

Aircraft
- Aircraft type: de Havilland Canada DHC-6 Twin Otter 300
- Operator: Air New England
- Registration: N383EX
- Flight origin: LaGuardia Airport, New York, New York, United States
- Destination: Barnstable Municipal Airport, Barnstable County, Massachusetts, United States
- Passengers: 8
- Crew: 2
- Fatalities: 1 (Pilot)
- Injuries: 4 or 5
- Survivors: 9

Air New England Flight 248 was a De Havilland DHC-6 Twin Otter that crashed on approach to Barnstable Municipal Airport in Barnstable County, Massachusetts, on June 17, 1979. All of those on the aircraft survived with the exception of the pilot, who was killed instantly.

== Flight designations, route, and crew ==
At 10:48 p.m. EDT on 17 June 1979, Flight 248, with eight passengers and a crew of two, crashed in a heavily wooded area in the Yarmouth Port section of Yarmouth, Massachusetts, about 1.5 miles (2.4 km) northeast of Barnstable Municipal Airport while on an instrument landing system (ILS) approach. The crash occurred on the end of a flight from LaGuardia Airport in New York, New York. The aircraft, piloted by Air New England co-founder George Parmenter, was several miles short of the runway.

== Crash ==
The aircraft crashed in the middle of Camp Greenough, a heavily wooded Boy Scouts of America camp. Parmenter was killed in the crash. The co-pilot and several passengers were injured.

An uninjured passenger managed to make her way through thick brush to the Mid Cape Highway (Route 6), and flagged down a passing car. The motorist drove her to the airport, where she alerted authorities to the crash. Rescuers, with the aid of a brush-clearing truck, were able to cut a swath through the brush to the crash site and aid the survivors.

== Book ==
In June 2009, author Robert Sabbag, one of the passengers on board Air New England Flight 248, released a book called Down Around Midnight (Viking Adult, ISBN 978-0-670-02102-4), a first-hand account of the crash from survivors and rescuers.

== See also ==
- Aviation safety
- Emergency landing
- List of accidents and incidents involving commercial aircraft
