= Norman Ollestad =

American writer

Norman Ollestad Jr.
- Born: May 30, 1967 (age 59); Los Angeles, California, US
- Occupation: Writer
- Children: 1
- Writing career
- Notable works: Crazy for the Storm: A Memoir of Survival, French Girl with Mother
- Website: normanollestad.com

Norman Ollestad Jr. (born May 30, 1967) is an American author. At the age of eleven, he was the only survivor of a plane crash that claimed the life of his father. He wrote about it in his 2009 bestseller Crazy for the Storm: A Memoir of Survival. His subsequent book, French Girl with Mother, a novel, came out in October 2016.

== Early life ==
Ollestad was born to Norman and Doris Ollestad, and was raised in Topanga Beach, California. He was thrust into the world of surfing and competitive downhill skiing at a very young age by his father and later said that he resented losing his childhood to his father's reckless and demanding adventures. He became a competitive hockey player and skier, winning the Southern California Slalom Skiing Championship at age 11. Norman was called "Boy Wonder" by his father.

Norman lived much of his early life at his mother's house, where his mom's boyfriend Nick also stayed; Nick was often drunk and yelled at Norman, punishing him, making him get in fights, and even hurting him. Norman tried to avoid Nick by spending time with his dog, Sunny, or down a canyon near his house where he had made a fort, or at the house of his unofficial godmother, Eleanor Kendall.

On February 19, 1979, a chartered Cessna carrying 11-year-old Ollestad, his father, his father's girlfriend (Sandra Cressman), and the pilot (Rob Arnold), crashed into Southern California's San Gabriel Mountains. Ollestad's father died in the crash, and the pilot shortly after. Suspended at over 8,000 feet and engulfed in a blizzard, Ollestad descended the mountain with Sandra, but she died after a fall down a chute. Norman was the sole survivor of the crash. He later told the Los Angeles Times that "My dad told me never to give up."

Ollestad later traveled to St. Anton in the Austrian Alps, and decided to become a writer. He returned to Los Angeles and enrolled in UCLA Film School, where he also studied creative writing. In 2006, Ollestad began the process of returning to the painful memories of the crash in preparation for writing Crazy For The Storm. Returning to the crash site, Ollestad found pieces of wreckage, and reconnected with the family who had given him shelter once he reached safety.

Later on in his life, Norman got married and had a son named Noah. He treated his son like his father had treated him, teaching his son skiing and surfing, but allowing him to choose his own pace instead of forcing it upon him.

== Crazy for the Storm ==
Crazy for the Storm: A Memoir of Survival is Norman Ollestad's 2009 bestselling book. Set in Malibu and Mexico in the late 1970s, the memoir describes the bohemian surf culture of Southern California and Ollestad's conflicted feelings towards his father. The story recounts the tests of skill that prepared Norman to become a surfer and ski champion, and which later helped to save his life.

The Los Angeles Times wrote "The book alternates between a detailed account of the plane crash and Ollestad's story of his parents' busted marriage. Of particular interest is his charismatic, adrenaline-junkie father, whom the young Norman describes as a somewhat methodical, somewhat reckless "enchanter," devotedly driving his son to early-morning hockey practices and faraway ski tournaments, but also dragging him along to Mexico, where they wound up stranded in the jungle without food or money after fleeing bribe-seeking federales wielding guns."

In June 2009, the memoir was released; the book reached the top-ten bestseller lists for both The New York Times and The Los Angeles Times. Crazy For The Storm was also selected as Starbucks June book selection, and iTunes picked it as one of the best summer reads. Most recently, it was chosen by Amazon as one of the 'Best Books of the Year...So Far'.

In early May 2009, Warner Bros. picked up the option to turn Crazy for the Storm into a motion picture.

The memoir Crazy for the Storm talks about the growing process of the author, Norman Ollestad, supervised by his strict dad, who asks him to surf, ski, and play hockey at his very young age. Norman resented this at first, and describes his father as "reckless," yet after the air crash, he realized how much his dad loved him.

The book largely focuses on the growth of Norman's inner world. He disagreed with his father at first. He could not understand why his dad woke him very early in the morning to play hockey when he had firmly insisted that he did not want to. He couldn't understand why his dad insisted on his surfing frequently. Gradually, he accepted his father's demands. He came to realize that his dad wanted him to become a strong, confident and brave man. The skill and courage he had developed with his surfing and skiing had greatly helped the author to survive through the aftermath of the air crash. He came to thank his dad for his longtime training and teaching, and for what his dad admonished: "Never give up."

== Norman Ollestad, Sr. ==
Ollestad calls Crazy for the Storm a tribute to his father. Norman Tennyson Ollestad II had been a child actor, appearing in the movie Cheaper by the Dozen. Later he joined the FBI, but soon grew disillusioned with J. Edgar Hoover and wrote a book called Inside the FBI, which did not endear him to his former employers. He later retreated to the hippie enclave of Topanga Beach, at the south end of Malibu, where he surfed and worked as a lawyer.

== Bibliography ==
- Crazy for the Storm: A Memoir of Survival (non-fiction, 2009);
- French Girl with Mother, a novel (October 2016)
- Sole Survivor (non-fiction, 2025)
