= Robert Sabbag =

American journalist

Robert Sabbag is an American author and journalist. His books include Snowblind: A Brief Career in the Cocaine Trade, and the memoir Down Around Midnight, about a fatal plane crash he survived in 1979.

== Personal ==
Sabbag, the son of a career naval officer, was born in Boston, Massachusetts. As a child he moved from school to school until the seventh grade, when he entered the Boston Latin School, from which he graduated in 1964. He attended Georgetown University as a pre-med student, a classmate of future president Bill Clinton, graduating in 1968. He attended his 25th and 30th college reunions at the White House, writing about the events in Rolling Stone and The New York Times, respectively.

== Career ==
Upon graduation from college, Sabbag went to work as a general assignment reporter for the Washington Daily News, a Scripps Howard tabloid in the nation's capital. In 1970 he was hired as a reporter by the Hearst-owned Boston Record-American, for which he worked only briefly. He arrived in New York City, unemployed, in the spring of 1971.

In February 1974 at the Algonquin Hotel in New York, Sabbag was introduced to smuggler Charles Forsman, who was on trial at the time, and agreed to write a book about his exploits. Snowblind: A Brief Career in the Cocaine Trade, in which Forsman was given the pseudonym Zachary Swan, was published in hardcover three years later by the Bobbs-Merrill Company. Hunter Thompson called it "a flat-out ballbuster," The New Yorker "a triumphant piece of reporting." The 1978 paperback, published by Avon Books, was a bestseller. Novelist Robert Stone called Snowblind "One of the best books about drugs ever written."

In 1999 Snowblind was issued in a limited edition designed by British artist Damien Hirst. Bound in mirrored glass, numbered and signed by both author and artist, each book contains a rolled hundred-dollar bill whose U.S. Treasury serial number corresponds to the series number of the book. A copy of the museum-quality piece was presented personally to Her Majesty Queen Elizabeth by the book's publisher, Jamie Byng of Canongate Books.

Since the publication of his first book, Sabbag's feature writing has appeared regularly in numerous national magazines, including Rolling Stone, Playboy, Men’s Journal New York, the New York Times Magazine and the Los Angeles Times Magazine.

For his second book, Too Tough to Die, Sabbag secured the cooperation of the United States Marshals Service. The book, a Reader’s Digest selection for "Today’s Best Nonfiction," led four years later to his New York Times Magazine cover story "The Invisible Family," the most comprehensive inside look at the federal Witness Security Program (popularly known as the "witness protection program") ever afforded a journalist by the Department of Justice. HBO purchased the motion picture rights to the article, and its film, Witness Protection, which Sabbag co-wrote, was nominated for two Golden Globe Awards, including Best Picture.

In 2002 Sabbag published Smokescreen: A True Adventure (originally titled Loaded: A Misadventure on the Marijuana Trail), about failed filmmaker Allen Long, who in the late 1970s smuggled more than 900,000 pounds of Colombian marijuana into the United States. British rights to the book were purchased by Canongate Books, which promoted the book with a "Smugglers' Tour," in which Sabbag and Long appeared before audiences at various venues in the U.K. with celebrity smuggler and bestselling author Howard Marks (also known as "Mr. Nice"). Smokescreen was a bestseller (Canongate's first) in its British edition, making the hardcover lists of both the Sunday Times and the Observer.

Sabbag in 2009 published Down Around Midnight, a memoir of the fatal plane crash he survived in the wake of Snowblind's publication thirty years earlier.

Sabbag is a member of the Authors Guild and Writers Guild of America. He is represented by the William Morris Endeavor agency.

== Bibliography ==
- Snowblind: A Brief Career in the Cocaine Trade (1998: reprint edition) Grove Press ISBN 0-8021-3589-7, ISBN 978-0-8021-3589-6
- Too Tough to Die: Down and Dangerous With the U. S. Marshals (1992) Simon & Schuster ISBN 0-671-66094-2, ISBN 978-0-671-66094-9
- Smokescreen: A True Adventure (2002: reprint edition. Originally titled Loaded: A Misadventure on the Marijuana Trail) Canongate U.S. ISBN 1-84195-379-2, ISBN 978-1-84195-379-3
- Down Around Midnight (2009) Viking ISBN 0-670-02102-4, ISBN 978-0-670-02102-4

== Awards and honors ==
His film Witness Protection was nominated for two Golden Globe Awards, including Best Picture.
