= King of the Jungle (2000 film) =

- Promotional film poster
- Directed by: Seth Zvi Rosenfeld
- Written by: Seth Zvi Rosenfeld
- Starring: John Leguizamo; Rosie Perez; Julie Carmen; Cliff Gorman; Michael Rapaport; Marisa Tomei; Justin Pierce; Annabella Sciorra; Judy Reyes; Richie Perez; Ian "Blaze" Kelley
- Music by: Harry Gregson-Williams
- Release date: October 12, 2000
- Running time: 87 minutes
- Country: United States
- Language: English

King of the Jungle is a 2000 American drama film starring John Leguizamo, Rosie Perez, Michael Rapaport, Marisa Tomei, Rosario Dawson, Julie Carmen, Justin Pierce and Cliff Gorman. It was written and directed by Seth Zvi Rosenfeld.

== Premise ==
Seymour's happy New York City existence comes to a tragic end after he witnesses the murder of his mother, a renowned civil rights activist. When he finds a gun in the home of his best friend, he embarks on a deranged quest for revenge.

== Cast ==
- John Leguizamo as Seymour
- Rosie Perez as Joanne
- Julie Carmen as Mona
- Cliff Gorman as Jack
- Michael Rapaport as Francis
- Marisa Tomei as Detective Susan Costello
- Justin Pierce as "Lil' Mafia"
- Rosario Dawson as Veronica
- Annabella Sciorra as "Mermaid"
- Judy Reyes as Lydia Morreto
- Richie Perez as "Pucho"
- Ian "Blaze" Kelley as "Dead-Eye"
- Rafeal Nunez as Basketball Kid #1
- Malcolm Barrett as Basketball Kid 2
- Raymond Vincente as Colon
- Yan Ming as "Fat" Ming

== Reception ==
The movie received a mixed reception from critics.

On the review aggregator website Rotten Tomatoes, 24% of 17 critics' reviews are positive, with an average rating of 4.2/10.
