= Marisa Polvino =

American film producer

Marisa Polvino is an American film producer based in New York City. She is the co-founder of Straight Up Films, and has been the co-owner of the company since 2014.

== Career ==
Polvino headed production at Revere Pictures for several years, and in 2005 was part of GTO Productions. She then co-founded the boutique film and commercial company Straight Up Films in 2008,

Marisa Polvino has produced the films Outside Providence, The Education of Charlie Banks, The Door in the Floor, Brooklyn Rules, A Shot at Glory, and Manos sucias (executive producer) and I’ll Sleep When I am Dead (co-producer). In 2014, the film Manos Sucias screened at the Cannes Film Festival.

In 2015 Polvino developed the sci-fi thriller Apex (executive producer), with Barry Josephson, the political serio-comedy Prince of Providence, with Steven Soderbergh and written by David Mamet. She is one of several producers who worked on Transcendence with Broderick Johnson and Andrew Kosove of Alcon Entertainment and directed by Wally Pfister

In March 2021 Marisa Polvino and Kate Cohen launched Straight Up Impact, a sister company of Straight Up Films focused on positive impact productions.

== Filmography ==
Release date	Title	Directors	Role	Refs
1999	Outside Providence	Michael Corrente		
1999	A Shot at Glory	Michael Corrente		
2004	The Door in the Floor	Tod Williams		
2007	The Education of Charlie Banks	Fred Durst		
2007	Brooklyn Rules	Michael Corrente		
2014	Manos sucias	Josef Wladyka	Executive producer	
	Apex		Executive producer	
	Prince of Providence			
2014	Transcendence	Wally Pfister		
