= Michael Raynor (actor) =

American actor

Michael Raynor is an American actor, director and writer. He is best known for his role as Joseph Morgan in ER, Apollo 15 Astronaut Al Worden in From the Earth to the Moon, Mick in the movie A Brother's Kiss and Frank in the movie Federal Hill.

== Early life ==
Raynor met and became best friends with Nick Chinlund, who was later his co-star in the movie A Brother's Kiss.

== Acting ==
Raynor wrote and performed the one man show Who is Floyd Stearn? Off-Broadway.

Raynor's film credits include leads in Shadow Boxing (1993), The Waiting Game (1999) (with Will Arnett), Tripfall (2000) (opposite Eric Roberts and John Ritter), The Reunion (1998), The First Man (1996) (opposite Leslie Ann Warren and Heather Graham), A Brother's Kiss (1997) (with Cathy Moriarty, Rosie Perez and John Leguizamo), Federal Hill (1994) (Deauville Film Festival Winner, Critics Award and Audience Award) as well as Allison Eastwood's, Rails & Ties (2007), The Pavilion (2004), Sonic Impact (2000) (with Ice-T), The Taxman (1998) (with Joe Pantoliano and Michael Chiklis), Mike Nichols’ Wolf (1994), The Advocate (2013) and For the Love of Money (2012).

His television work includes From the Earth to the Moon (as Apollo 15 astronaut Al Worden), Bella Mafia (opposite Jennifer Tilly), and In The Line of Duty: Hunt for Justice (opposite Nicholas Turturro, Adam Arkin and Melissa Leo), as well as guest starring roles on Criminal Minds, Castle, Southland, Law & Order: LA, Cold Case, CSI, ER, Law & Order, Shark, NYPD Blue, Brooklyn South, Brimstone, Everybody Hates Chris, and My Own Worst Enemy.

== Notable work ==
Who Is Floyd Stearn? was originally developed with Mark Travis. The New York Times called Who Is Floyd Stearn? “the best family confessional play they’ve seen” and The New York Post named Raynor to a "2005 Galaxy of New Stars" list after the Off-Broadway run produced by his childhood friend, Rick Waxman.

The JewishJournal.com wrote an article about Who is Floyd Stearn? which painted a picture of the emotional turmoil Raynor has faced while dealing with his father's absence.

Howard Stern was so moved by the production, he wrote Raynor and talked about his own relationship with his father.

== Filmography ==
Film

Year	Title	Role
1993	Shadow Boxing	Johnny
1994	Federal Hill	Frank
1994	Hand Gun	Raid Cop #4
1994	Full Cycle	Jake
1996	The First Man	Jill Rosen
1997	A Brother's Kiss	Mick
1998	The Reunion	Father Michael
1998	Taxman	Exon Executive
1999	The Waiting Game	Franco
2000	Tripfall	Franklin Ross
2000	Sonic Impact	Agent Allen
2007	Rails & Ties	Detective Christian Fox
2012	For the Love of Money	Martz
2013	The Advocate	Detective Perkins

Television

Year	Title	Episode	Role
1992	Law & Order	Intolerance (42/2:20)	Acuff
1995	In The Line of Duty: Hunt for Justice	[TV Movie]	Jimmy
1996	Space: Above and Beyond	Never No More (14/1:14)	Lt. Hall
1997	Bella Mafia	[TV Movie]	Jerry Bernstein
1998	Brooklyn South	Don't You Be My Valentine (16/1:16)	Johnny Rodriguez
1998	From the Earth to the Moon	Galileo Was Right (10)	Al Worden
1998	Brimstone	Encore (3/1:3)	Tim Nowack
2000	ER	Sand and Water (137/7:2)	Joseph Morgan
2003	NYPD Blue	Tranny Get Your Gun (10:15)	Randy Rupe
2006	Shark	Fashion Police (6/1:6)	Joe Bertelsen
2007	Company Man	[TV Movie]	Guard
2007	CSI: Crime Scene Investigation	Go To Hell (168/8:3)	Alvin Macalino
2008	Everybody Hates Chris	Everybody hates Being Cool (63/3:19)	FBI Agent
2008	My Own Worst Enemy	The Night Train to Moscow (5/1:5)	Serik Shefer
2010	Cold Case	Metamorphosis (148/7:14)	State Detective #2
2010	Law & Order: LA	Hondo Field (6/1:6)	Vince Braden
2011	Southland	Discretion (16/3:3)	John Devine
2011	Criminal Minds	The Stranger (135/6:21)	Detective Bryce Harding
2013	Castle	Time Will Tell (110/6:5)	Dr. Silverman
