= Justin Pierce =

Actor (1975–2000)

- Undated photo of Pierce
- Born: Justin Charles Pierce; March 21, 1975; London, England
- Died: July 10, 2000 (aged 25); Las Vegas, Nevada, U.S.
- Occupations: Actor; skateboarder
- Years active: 1995–2000
- Spouse: Gina Rizzo (m. 1999)

Justin Charles Pierce (March 21, 1975 – July 10, 2000) was an actor and skateboarder. Born in London and raised in New York City, Pierce had a troubled childhood and pursued skateboarding. His breakthrough came with the controversial coming of age drama film Kids (1995), which won him the Independent Spirit Award for Best Breakthrough Performance. He then starred in the independent film A Brother's Kiss (1997) and the stoner comedy film Next Friday (2000). His final film, Looking for Leonard (2002), was released posthumously.

As a skateboarder, Pierce was a member of the original Zoo York and Supreme teams. He married stylist Gina Rizzo in 1999. He died by suicide on July 10, 2000.

== Early life ==
Pierce was born in London, England, and raised in the Marble Hill and Kingsbridge sections of New York City. During his youth, Pierce stole cigarettes and food, and frequently skipped school in favour of skateboarding before dropping out. He never earned a diploma or GED.

== Career ==
While skateboarding in Washington Square Park, Pierce was discovered by film director Larry Clark, who cast him as Casper, a profane drug-addicted skateboarder, in his coming of age drama film Kids. On multiple accounts, Pierce "would get really fucked up, drunk, and get arrested" and "get into fistfights" with co-star Leo Fitzpatrick during filming. Kids premiered at the 1995 Cannes Film Festival, and experienced commercial success with a theatrical release that same year. The film garnered a significant amount of controversy, but was a surprise blockbuster and Pierce's breakthrough role. Mike Domski of MovieWeb called his talent "indisputable" and The Guardian believed he was the "best placed for a successful follow-on career." He won the Independent Spirit Award for Best Breakthrough Performance in 1996.

In 1995, Pierce became a member of the original Supreme Crew with fellow Zoo York team riders and close friends Harold Hunter and Peter Bici. Footage of Pierce and the Supreme Crew skateboarding appeared on the Supreme New York website in 1996. He also joined the original Zoo York skateboard team, and is featured in the Zoo York "Mixtape" video (1998), as well as various magazines and adverts for the company.

Pierce appeared in the 1997 film A Brother's Kiss as the younger version of Nick Chinlund's character Lex. The independent production was directed by Seth Zvi Rosenfeld, who said Pierce "was always prepared and a natural actor… He had an old soul, but underneath his tough street exterior was a really sweet kid." Also in 1997, he starred in the television film First Time Felon with Omar Epps. He next filmed the comedy Pigeonholed alongside Rosanna Arquette and Marianne Hagan, which was released in 1999. He starred alongside Ice Cube and Mike Epps in the 2000 film Next Friday, as Roach. Though the film was negatively received by critics, it was a commercial success.

Pierce's last on-screen credits were appearing in 2 episodes of Malcolm in the Middle and the Canadian crime drama Looking for Leonard, which released posthumously in 2002 and is dedicated to Pierce. Following his death, Supreme featured unused photographs of Pierce by Ari Marcopoulos in its clothing lines and publications.

== Personal life and death ==
He relocated to Los Angeles after being cast in Kids. In 1999, he married stylist Gina Rizzo in Las Vegas.

On July 10, 2000, Pierce was found hanging in his room at the Bellagio Hotel in Paradise, Nevada, by hotel security. His death was ruled a suicide, and suicide notes were reportedly found but not released to the public. A Catholic memorial service for Pierce was held at St. Patrick's Old Cathedral in Manhattan that same month. He is buried in the Gate of Heaven Cemetery in Hawthorne, New York. His mother died in 2006.

== Filmography ==
=== Film ===
List of films and roles
Year	Title	Role	Notes
1995	Kids	Casper	
1997	A Brother's Kiss	Young Lex	
1998	Wild Horses	Rookie	Also known as Lunch Time Special
1998	Myth America	Toby	
1998	Freak Weather	Pizza Guy	
1999	Too Pure	Leo	
1999	Out in Fifty	Freddy	
1999	Pigeonholed	Devon	
1999	The Big Tease	Skateboard Kid	
2000	Next Friday	Roach	
2000	King of the Jungle	Lil' Mafia	Posthumous release
2000	BlackMale	Luther Wright	Also known as Blackmail
2002	Looking for Leonard	Chevy	Posthumous release
2021	Kid 90	Himself	Documentary; archive footage
2021	We Were Once Kids	Himself	Documentary; archive footage
2021	All The Streets Are Silent: The Convergence of Hip Hop and Skateboarding	Himself	Documentary; archive footage

=== Television ===
List of television appearances and roles
Year	Title	Role	Notes
1997	First Time Felon	Eddie	Television film
2000	This Is How the World Ends	Zombie	Pilot
2000	Malcolm in the Middle	Justin	2 episodes

== Awards and nominations ==
List of awards and nominations received by Justin Pierce
Award	Year (Note: Indicates the year of ceremony. Each year is linked to the article about the awards held that year, wherever possible.)	Category	Nominated work	Result	Ref.
Independent Spirit Awards	1996	Best Debut Performance	Kids	Won	
