= Emil A. Ciccotelli =

Emilio "Emil" Anthony Ciccotelli (1929–1998) was a Deputy Chief and Chief of Detectives for the New York City Police Department. He also served for a time as Head of Security at Yankee Stadium, and as a professor of criminal justice at Iona College. He is most widely known for his role in the reduction of influence and power of the five major organized crime families in New York City in the 1980s and early 1990s, as well as his close work with future mayor of New York Rudy Giuliani in catalyzing a congressional investigation of organized crime syndicates. He died in August 1998 at the age of 69. He is buried in Gate of Heaven Cemetery in Westchester County, New York.
