= Gloria Votsis =

American film and television actress (born 1979)

- Born: February 9, 1979 (age 47); Pittsford, New York, U.S.
- Occupation: Actress
- Years active: 2003–present
- Spouse: Scott Davis (m. 2015)
- Children: 2

Gloria Votsis (born February 9, 1979) is an American film and television actress. She is known for her roles in several television series such as Hawaii Five-0, The Gates, CSI: Miami, Person of Interest, and Suburgatory. She also had a recurring role as Alex Hunter on the USA drama series White Collar.

== Early life ==
Gloria Votsis was born on February 9, 1979, in New York. Votsis grew up in upstate New York in a self-professed "big Greek family". At the age of 17, she studied abroad for her senior year of high school in France. She attended New York University and worked in finance for several years. After quitting her job in finance, she relocated to Los Angeles to pursue a career in acting.

== Career ==
Votsis began her career starring in commercials, most notably several toothpaste commercials for Crest. She began her acting career in the early 2000s by appearing in small roles in several American television series and films. In 2010, she portrayed Vanessa Buckley in the supernatural television series The Gates. She also played the role of Alex Hunter in the USA Network series White Collar, appearing in nine episodes. She appeared in episodes of Sex and the City; Six Degrees; Dirt; Cupid; CSI: Miami; The Millers; Grimm and The Night Shift. She also had roles in films The Education of Charlie Banks (2007), Train (2008) and Killer Movie (2008).

== Personal life ==
Votsis speaks French and Greek fluently. She married Scott Davis on September 5, 2015.

== Filmography ==
=== Film ===
Year	Title	Role	Notes
2007	The Education of Charlie Banks	Nia	
2008	Train	Claire	
2008	Killer Movie	Keir	
2014	Mr. Maple Leaf	Operator (Voice)	Short film

=== Television ===
Year	Title	Role	Notes
2003	Sex and the City	Prada Clerk	"Lights, Camera, Relationship"
2005	NCIS	Dana	"Kill Ari: Part 2"
2005	Inconceivable	Sophia Contini	"Face Your Demon Semen", "The Last Straw"
2005	Love, Inc.	Megan	"Amen"
2006	Jake in Progress	Megan	"The Hot One"
2007	Six Degrees	Karen Clarke	"Sedgewick's"
2008	Dirt	Jen	"And the Winner Is"
2009	Cupid	Holly	"Pilot"
2009	The Philanthropist	Luellen	"Pilot"
2009	CSI: NY	Risa Calaveras	"Epilogue"
2010	The Gates	Vanessa Buckley	5 episodes
2010	Blue Bloods	Sabrina	"After Hours"
2010–2012	White Collar	Alex Hunter	9 episodes
2011	CSI: Miami	Sgt. Jennifer Swanson	"Last Stand"
2011	Suburgatory	Zoe	"The Nutcracker", "Thanksgiving"
2012	Hawaii Five-0	Holly Malone	"Mai Ka Wa Kahiko"
2012	Person of Interest	Maxine Angelis	"Bury the Lede"
2013	The Millers	Sonya	"Cancellation Fee"
2013	Revenge	Morgan Holt	"Dissolution"
2014	Grimm	Younger Kelly Burkhardt	"Synchronicity"
2015	Beauty & the Beast	Julianna Keaton	3 episodes
2015	The Night Shift	Lydia Ragosa	2 episodes
2015	Criminal Minds	Agent Debbie Webster	"Awake"
2021	9-1-1	Beth Reidman	"Parenthood"
2026	The Madison	Chelsea	1 episode
