= Train (2008 film) =

- Directed by: Gideon Raff
- Written by: Gideon Raff
- Produced by: Boaz Davidson; Danny Lerner; Les Weldon
- Starring: Thora Birch; Derek Magyar; Gideon Emery; Kavan Reece; Gloria Votsis
- Cinematography: Martina Radwan
- Edited by: Alain Jakubowicz
- Music by: Michael Wandmacher
- Distributed by: Millennium Films; Nu Image Films
- Release date: October 16, 2008 (Screamfest Horror Film Festival)
- Running time: 94 minutes
- Country: United States
- Languages: English, Bulgarian, Russian

Train is a 2008 slasher film directed and written by Gideon Raff and starring Thora Birch and Gideon Emery.

== Plot ==
In Eastern Europe, a group of US college athletes are participating in a wrestling championship; they include Todd (Derek Magyer) and his girlfriend Alex (Thora Birch), Sheldon (Kavan Reece), Claire (Gloria Votsis), and young assistant coach Willy (Gideon Emery). After a hard match, they sneak away from their hotel to an underground club. However, the next morning, they return too late for their train to Odessa.

Coach Harris (Todd Jensen) has stayed behind to wait for them. At the station, a woman named Dr. Velislava (Koina Ruseva) approaches and explains that train tickets are normally purchased after one has boarded. The coach and team members join her in boarding the train. Two workers from the train take their passports, and later burn them.

In the dinner car, Harris is joined by the doctor, who flirts with him. They go to his room to have sex, but she injects him with a tranquilizer. He awakes in a torture chamber, screaming as he is stitched in the abdomen. Meanwhile, the students and Willy drink and play a game truth or dare. Todd gets dared to run down to the end of the train and back in his underwear. He reaches the end of the train and is found by one of the workers who charges at him and captures him. Todd is strung up, has his ribcage broken open, spine severed, and eyes removed. Dr. Velislava is then seen fetching a mother who has a son with what appears to be severe glaucoma in his left eye.

The next morning, upon finding Todd still missing, the group start looking for him. While searching, Sheldon is attacked by the two demented workers, who drag him to the torture car. Dr. Veliskava allows a middle-aged man to view Sheldon's genitalia before she cuts them off without any anesthesia, causing him to blackout. Claire reaches the end cart and finds the burned remains of the passports. She is caught looking for more information and is hooked by the mouth and dragged to the chamber. Willy and Alex find the torture chamber where Todd is vivisected and Sheldon is alive in a cage. They free him and when they see Todd is still breathing, Sheldon kills him out of mercy. Just then, the torturer arrives dragging in Claire. Willy and Alex escape, chased by the torturer, but Sheldon and Claire are left behind. Alex and Willy are caught by the doctor. It is then revealed that all the other passengers are transplant patients, and tourists are being harvested for organs.

Back in the torture car, Claire, Alex, and Willy watch in horror as Sheldon is vivisected and his heart pulled out. While the captors go to another car to perform the transplant, Alex manages to escape and hides in a sleeper compartment. The next morning, at a military checkpoint, the conductor drags Claire off the train to give to the platoon as a bribe so that they can pass. That night the train reaches a hospital. Alex disguises herself and sneaks off into the building where she finds Willy, horribly injured but still alive. She frees him and they escape into the woods. In the morning, Alex leaves Willy behind briefly, but then from a distance she sees him brutally murdered by the torturers from the hospital.

She returns to the train as it is about to pull away to its next destination. Alex kills the torturers, douses the train with gasoline and sets it ablaze, and decouples the last car, which slows to a stop. As she stops to look over the bridge, she is attacked by one of the surviving torturers. After a struggle, she manages to subdue him. When he wakes up, he finds himself strapped to the train tracks. Moments later, a train runs over him before she escapes down the tracks. Sometime later, Alex enters a wrestling match with grim confidence.

== Cast ==
- Thora Birch as Alexandra "Alex" Roper
- Derek Magyar as Todd Patterson
- Gideon Emery as Willy
- Kavan Reece as Sheldon
- Gloria Votsis as Claire
- Valentin Ganev as Conductor Vasyl Alekseenko
- Ivan Barnev as Gregor
- Todd Jensen as Coach Harris
- Nikolay Mutafchiev as Vasily
- Zahary Baharov as Croupier

== Production ==
The film was shot on location in Bulgaria and was originally set to be a remake of the 1980 horror film Terror Train, which starred Jamie Lee Curtis. However, it later evolved into an original project, sharing only the setting of a train.

== Release ==
In the United States it was released first with its NC-17 cut (the highest age classification in the USA) in October at the Screamfest Festival according to the website Bloody Disgusting. It was acquired by Lionsgate to trim the movie to an R rating (second highest age classification) for its commercial distribution.
