= Tripfall =

2000 film directed by Serge Rodnunsky

- Directed by: Serge Rodnunsky
- Written by: Serge Rodnunsky
- Produced by: Serge Rodnunsky; Gerald I. Wolff
- Starring: Eric Roberts; John Ritter; Rachel Hunter
- Cinematography: Greg Patterson
- Edited by: Toby Yates
- Music by: Evan Evans
- Distributed by: Artist View Entertainment
- Release date: June 27, 2000
- Running time: 91 minutes
- Country: United States
- Language: English

Tripfall is a 2000 American thriller film directed and written by Serge Rodnunsky and starring Eric Roberts (as Eddie), John Ritter (as Tom Williams), Rachel Hunter (as Gina Williams), Michael Raynor (as Franklin Ross) and Katy Boyer (as Lonnie Campos). The music was composed by Evan Evans.

== Plot ==
The family of Tom Williams takes a vacation in California and is later kidnapped by Eddie, his girlfriend Lonnie and Franklin Ross. They want 1.2 million dollars.

== Cast ==
- Eric Roberts as Eddie
- John Ritter as Tom Williams
- Rachel Hunter as Gina Williams, Tom's wife
- Michael Raynor as Franklin Ross
- Katy Boyer as Lonnie Campos
- Christina Ann Moore as Angela Williams, Tom & Gina's daughter
- Tyler Cole Malinger as Michael Williams, Tom & Gina's son
- Wayne Duvall as Bank Manager
- Ken Palmer as Andrew
