= Sonic Impact =

- Theatrical release poster
- Directed by: Rodney McDonald
- Written by: Sean McGinly
- Produced by: Alison Semenza, Jim Wynorski
- Starring: James Russo; Ice-T; Mel Harris; Michael Harris
- Cinematography: Thomas L. Callaway (credited as Tom Callaway)
- Edited by: Randy Carter
- Music by: David Wurst; Eric Wurst
- Production company: Phoenician Entertainment
- Distributed by: New City Releasing
- Release date: March 14, 2000; (Iceland)
- Running time: 94 min.
- Language: English

Sonic Impact is a 2000 action/thriller directed by Rodney McDonald and starring James Russo, Mel Harris, Michael Harris and Ice-T, with Michael Raynor.

== Plot ==
Jeremy Barrett, a deranged criminal, is caught by FBI agent Nick Halton and transported on a Columbia Airlines Boeing 747 to New York along with some other criminals. Through a stroke of luck, he is able to subdue the escorting Federal agents, led by Agent Taja; free the other criminals; and take over the 747. After killing one of the passengers and the pilot, Barrett demands a ransom and a helicopter at San Diego, where the 747 is being diverted.

When a small explosion is caused by a gun shot striking an oxygen tank, a massive hole is opened in the cockpit, and with the aircraft badly damaged, Barrett threatens to crash the 747 into a populated area unless his demands are met. Halton then decides to get on the 747 while in flight to do something. He is lowered into the cockpit, but things do not go as planned. Unless the agent can do something, the military will be forced to shoot the aircraft down to minimize the toll.

== Cast ==
- James Russo as FBI Agent Nick Halton
- Ice-T as Agent Taja
- Michael Harris as Jeremy Barrett
- Sam Anderson as Alex Holmes
- J. Kenneth Campbell as Pilot Tom Rush
- Mel Harris as Co-Pilot Jennifer Blake
- Michael Harney as Captain Mark Travis
- Dean Norris as FBI Agent McGee
- Brittany Daniel as Rachel
- Billy "Sly" Williams as Sam Hobbs
- Michael Raynor as FBI Agent Allen
- Heath Lourwood as John Strauss
- Justin Lauer as Ben Strauss
- Alice Barrett as Shelly Peterson (credited as Alice Barrett Mitchell)
- Steve Larson as Lester
- Robert Kerbeck as Vince Patrick
- Jack Maxwell as Byron
- Mike White as Rex
- Jordan Wolfe as Flight Attendant
- Aloma Wright as Travel Agent
- Marc Vahanian as Addict

== Production ==
The working title of the project was "Sonic Blast". Stock aerial scenes of the Boeing 747 were taken from Airport 1975 (1975). Airport 1975 had used a Boeing 747-123 freighter (cargo variant) s/n 20390 (registration N9675), leased from American Airlines, but painted in the fictional Columbia Airlines livery that was used in both films.

== Reception ==
At the 2000 WorldFest Houston, Sonic Impact won the Silver Award for Best Independent Theatrical Feature Films - Action/Adventure category.
