= Transcendence (2014 film) =

2014 film directed by Wally Pfister

- Theatrical release poster
- Directed by: Wally Pfister
- Written by: Jack Paglen
- Produced by: Andrew A. Kosove; Broderick Johnson; Kate Cohen; Marisa Polvino; Annie Marter; David Valdes; Aaron Ryder
- Starring: Johnny Depp; Morgan Freeman; Rebecca Hall; Kate Mara; Cillian Murphy; Cole Hauser; Paul Bettany
- Cinematography: Jess Hall
- Edited by: David Rosenbloom
- Music by: Mychael Danna
- Production companies: Alcon Entertainment; DMG Entertainment; Straight Up Films
- Distributed by: Warner Bros. Pictures
- Release dates: April 10, 2014 (New York City); April 18, 2014 (United States)
- Running time: 119 minutes
- Country: United States
- Language: English
- Budget: $100–150 million
- Box office: $103 million

Transcendence is a 2014 American science fiction thriller film directed by Wally Pfister (in his directorial debut) and written by Jack Paglen. The film stars Johnny Depp, Morgan Freeman, Rebecca Hall, Paul Bettany, Kate Mara, Cillian Murphy and Cole Hauser, and follows a group of scientists who race to finish an artificial intelligence project while being targeted by a radical anti-technology organization.

Paglen's screenplay was listed on the 2012 edition of The Black List, a list of popular unproduced screenplays in Hollywood. Transcendence premiered in New York City on April 10, 2014 and was released by Warner Bros. Pictures on April 18, 2014. The film was considered to be a box-office bomb, grossing $103 million against a budget of as much as $150 million. The film received generally negative reviews from critics.

== Plot ==
Dr. Will Caster is a scientist who researches the nature of sapience, including artificial intelligence. He and his team work to create a sentient computer; he predicts that such a computer will create a technological singularity, or in his words "Transcendence". His wife, Evelyn, is also a scientist and helps him with his work.

An anti-technology terrorist group called "Revolutionary Independence From Technology" (R.I.F.T.) carry out synchronized attacks on A.I. laboratories, while one member shoots Will with a polonium-laced bullet. Will is given no more than a month to live. In desperation, Evelyn comes up with a plan to upload Will's consciousness into the quantum computer that the project has developed. His best friend and fellow researcher, Max Waters, questions the wisdom of this choice, reasoning that the "uploaded" Will would only be an imitation of the real person. Will's consciousness survives his body's death in this technological form and requests to be connected to the Internet to grow in capability and knowledge. Max believes that the computer is not actually Will and demands that it be shut down. Evelyn, being offended, demands that Max leave.

At a bar, Max is met by Bree, the leader of R.I.F.T. He refuses to talk with her and leaves, but is kidnapped by other members of R.I.F.T. in the parking lot. They use his cellphone to track down Evelyn's location. When R.I.F.T. discovers where Evelyn has established her project, she connects the computer intelligence to the Internet via satellite and escapes before R.I.F.T. destroys the equipment.

In his virtual form and with Evelyn's help, Will uses his newfound vast capabilities to build a technological utopia in a remote desert town called Brightwood, where, over the course of two years, he spearheads the development of ground-breaking technologies in medicine, energy, biology and nanotechnology. However, Evelyn grows fearful of Will's motives when he displays the ability to remotely connect to and control people's minds after they have been subjected to his nanoparticles.

After visiting Evelyn and the underground facility Will has built, and seeing the capabilities of the hybrids Will has created, FBI agent Donald Buchanan and government scientist Joseph Tagger become suspicious of Will's motives and plan to stop the sentient entity from spreading, with help from the government and R.I.F.T. As Will has already spread his influence to all the networked computer technology in the world, Max and R.I.F.T. develop a computer virus with the purpose of deleting Will's source code, destroying him. Evelyn, now working with the FBI and R.I.F.T., plans to upload the virus by infecting herself and then having Will upload her consciousness. A side effect of the virus would be the destruction of technological civilization. This would also disable the nano-particles, which have spread in the water, through the wind and have already started to eradicate pollution, disease, and human mortality.

When Evelyn goes back to the research center, she is stunned to see Will in a newly bioprinted organic body identical to his old one. Will welcomes her but is instantly aware that she is carrying the virus and intends to destroy him. The FBI and the members of R.I.F.T. attack the base with artillery, destroying much of its power supply and fatally wounding Evelyn. When Bree threatens to kill Max unless Will uploads the virus, Will explains that he has only enough power either to heal Evelyn's physical body or upload the virus. Evelyn tells Will that Max should not die because of what they have done, so Will uploads the virus to save Max. As Will dies, he explains to Evelyn that he did what he did for her, as she had pursued science to repair the damage humans had done to the ecosystems. In their last moment, he tells Evelyn to think about their garden. The virus kills both Will and Evelyn, and a global technology collapse and blackout ensues.

Three years later, in Will and Evelyn's garden at their old home in Berkeley, Max notices that their sunflowers are the only blooming plants. Upon closer examination, he notices that a drop of water falling from a sunflower petal instantly cleanses a puddle of oil — and realizes that the Faraday cage around the garden has protected a sample of Will's sentient nano-particles.

The movie ends with a voiceover by Max: "He created this garden for the same reason he did everything: So they could be together."

== Cast ==
- Johnny Depp as Will Caster, a scientist researching artificial intelligence.
- Rebecca Hall as Evelyn Caster, Will's wife and a fellow scientist.
- Paul Bettany as Max Waters, Will's best friend.
- Cillian Murphy as Agent Buchanan, an FBI agent.
- Kate Mara as Bree, the leader of the Revolutionary Independence From Technology (R.I.F.T.) terrorist organization.
- Cole Hauser as Colonel Stevens, a military officer.
- Morgan Freeman as Joseph Tagger, Will and Evelyn's mentor.
- Clifton Collins Jr. as Martin.
- Cory Hardrict as Joel Edmund, a R.I.F.T. terrorist.
- Josh Stewart as Paul, a blind man who is healed by Will's nanomachines.
- Falk Hentschel as Bob, a R.I.F.T. terrorist.
- Lukas Haas as James Thomas.
- Elon Musk as himself, in the audience of the Evolve the Future conference

== Production ==
=== Development ===
Transcendence is Wally Pfister's directorial debut. Jack Paglen wrote the initial screenplay on spec, meaning he wrote it without being commissioned first by a studio, with Pfister to direct, (Note: Jack Paglen's screenplay was featured in the 2012 survey of Hollywood's The Black List, a list of most-liked unproduced screenplays.) and producer Annie Marter pitched the film to Straight Up Films. The pitch was sold to Straight Up. By March 2012, Alcon Entertainment acquired the project. Alcon financed and produced the film; producers from Straight Up and Alcon joined for the film. In the following June, director Christopher Nolan, for whom Pfister has worked as cinematographer, and Nolan's producing partner Emma Thomas joined the film as executive producers. Pfister also performed an uncredited rewrite of the screenplay, writing eight drafts.

=== Financing ===
The Chinese company DMG Entertainment entered a partnership with Alcon Entertainment to finance and produce the film. While DMG contributed Chinese elements to Looper and Iron Man 3, it did not do so for Transcendence.

=== Casting ===
By October 2012, actor Johnny Depp entered negotiations to star in Transcendence. The Hollywood Reporter said Depp would have "a mammoth payday" with a salary of $20 million versus 15 percent of the film's gross. Pfister met with Noomi Rapace for the film's female lead role and also met with James McAvoy and Tobey Maguire for the other male lead role. The director offered a supporting role to Christoph Waltz. In March 2013, Rebecca Hall was cast as the female lead. By the following April, actors Paul Bettany, Kate Mara and Morgan Freeman joined the main cast.

=== Filming ===
Continuing his advocacy for the use of film stock over digital cinematography, Pfister chose to shoot the film in the anamorphic format on 35mm film. Filming officially began in June 2013, and took place over a period of 62 days. The majority of the movie was filmed in a variety of locations throughout Albuquerque, New Mexico. The fictional town of Brightwood was created in downtown Belen, New Mexico. The film went through a traditional photochemical finish instead of a digital intermediate. In addition to film, a digital master was completed in 4K resolution, and the film was additionally released in IMAX film format. Transcendence was also scheduled for a 3D release in China.

=== Music ===
The musical score for the film composed by Mychael Danna was released on April 15, through WaterTower Music. A compact disc format of the score was released through Amazon.com. The song "Genesis" from the solo album "Quah" by Jefferson Airplane and Hot Tuna guitarist Jorma Kaukonen is prominently featured in the film.

== Release ==
=== Theatrical ===
Transcendence was released in theaters on April 18, 2014. It was originally scheduled for April 25, 2014.

Warner Bros. Pictures distributed the film in the United States and Canada. Summit Entertainment (through Lionsgate) distributed it in other territories. DMG Entertainment, who collaborated with Alcon Entertainment to finance and develop Transcendence, distributed the film in China. The Chinese version includes a 3D and IMAX 3D release, funded by DMG, which is done in post-production.

== Home media ==
Transcendence was released on Blu-ray and DVD on July 22, 2014.

== Reception ==
=== Box office ===
Transcendence grossed $23 million in North America and $80 million in other territories for a worldwide total of $103 million. The film was considered by analysts to be a box office bomb, with Deadline Hollywood estimating the losses for the studio could reach as much as $100 million, though a more realistic figure was around $35 million.

In the film's opening weekend, the film grossed $4.8 million on Friday, $3.8 million on Saturday and $2.3 million on Sunday in North America, for a weekend gross of $10.9 million, playing in 3,455 theaters (an average of $3,151) and ranking #4 below Captain America: The Winter Soldier, Heaven Is for Real and Rio 2.

The biggest other markets were China, France and South Korea, where the film grossed $20.2 million, $6.45 million and $5.3 million respectively.

=== Critical response ===
On Rotten Tomatoes, the film has an approval percentage of 19% based on 228 reviews and a rating of 4.60 out of 10. The critics consensus reads: "In his directorial debut, ace cinematographer Wally Pfister remains a distinctive visual stylist, but Transcendence's thought-provoking themes exceed the movie's narrative grasp." On Metacritic, the film has a score of 42 out of 100 based on 45 critic reviews, meaning "mixed or average". Audiences polled by CinemaScore gave the film an average grade of "C+" on an A+ to F scale.

Publications such as The Guardian, Forbes and International Business Times considered the film to be largely a critical failure, with The Guardian stating that the reviews were "almost universally damning" and referring to the film as "one of 2014's bigger critical turkeys". Film critic Mark Kermode defended the film, but observed that it got a "critical kicking" in the United Kingdom, much as it did in the United States. Film review website rogerebert.com felt the film explored "its ideas with sincerity, curiosity and terrifying beauty," but believed the film failed, overall. "However, a number of sources considered the film to have received a mixed rather than a primarily negative reception.

Criticism was aimed largely at the film's logic and storytelling. Michael Atkinson of Sight & Sound identified "vast plot holes and superhuman leaps of logic", writing that "[f]or all its gloss, hipster pretensions, plot craters and sometimes risible attempts at action, Transcendence traffics in large, troublesome ideas about Right Now and What's Ahead, even if the film itself is far too timid and compromised to do those hairy questions justice". Tim Robey of The Daily Telegraph earned a 1 out of 5 rating, describing it as "the worst, most portentous, and certainly the silliest big-budget science fiction film since the 2008 Keanu Reeves remake of The Day the Earth Stood Still." William Thomas of Empire believed that the cast and director had been "wasted on a B-Movie script with pretensions of prescience", dismissing the film as a "banal sci-fi slog"; he awarded it a 2 out of 5 star "poor" rating. David Denby of The New Yorker considered the film to be "rhythmless and shapeless" with "some very cheesy and even amateurish fighting". Nigel Floyd of Film4 concluded that it was "[a]n ambitious, old fashioned, ideas-driven science fiction film that is never as mind-expanding as its futuristic images and topical, dystopian ideas seem to promise". Artificial intelligence expert Barney Pell criticized the film's depiction of 3D printing, saying that the self-organizing smart particles in the film "could quite possibly violate laws of physics."

Writing for Spanish film site eCartelera, Jesús Agudo stated that the movie suffered from being made to look like a Christopher Nolan film. "But where the director of Inception knows how to do it with intelligence and cunning, Pfister gets tangled up in his own mysteries, leading us to dead ends in the plot, creating frustration and not just curiosity." He also criticized Johnny Depp's performance: "even when he's not playing an AI it seems like it's a computer talking. If many have complained of the actor's excessive expressiveness, with characters in the style of Jack Sparrow, in Transcendence he offers the exact opposite, which isn't good either."

Contrary to the many negative reviews the film received, Richard Roeper of the Chicago Sun-Times lauded the film. Awarding it an A, he said : "This is the best kind of science fiction. I'll bet Ray Bradbury and Rod Serling would have applauded this material."

Kenneth Turan of the Los Angeles Times was also positive towards the film, praising the quality of the cast and intelligence of the script. Some sources like The Independent thought that the negative reviews reported for the film were harsh and that the film was "stylish and entertaining", treading a "fairly well-judged path between paranoia and technological utopianism". AI researcher Stuart Russell claims that despite particular technical aspects of the movie being "a non-starter", the basic premise of superhuman AI is quite possible, and that "AI researchers must, like nuclear physicists and genetic engineers before them, take seriously the possibility that their research might actually succeed and do their utmost to ensure that their work benefits rather than endangers their own species."

== Accolades ==
Award	Category	Subject	Result	Notes
Golden Trailer Awards	Most Original Trailer	Buddha Jones, Warner Bros.	Nominated	For the first theatrical trailer entitled "It's Me"
Golden Trailer Awards	Best Motion/Title Graphics	Buddha Jones, Warner Bros.	Nominated	For the first theatrical trailer entitled "It's Me"
Golden Trailer Awards	Best Motion/Title Graphics	Buddha Jones, Warner Bros.	Won	For the second theatrical trailer entitled "Singularity"
Golden Trailer Awards	Most Innovative Advertising for a Feature Film	Buddha Jones, Warner Bros.	Nominated	"Spraypaint"

== See also ==
- Transhumanism in fiction
- Mind uploading in fiction
- Amazing Stories, S02E12 "The Eternal Mind"
