= Gate of Heaven Cemetery (Hawthorne, New York) =

Cemetery in Westchester County

Coordinates: 41.095697°N 73.794546°W

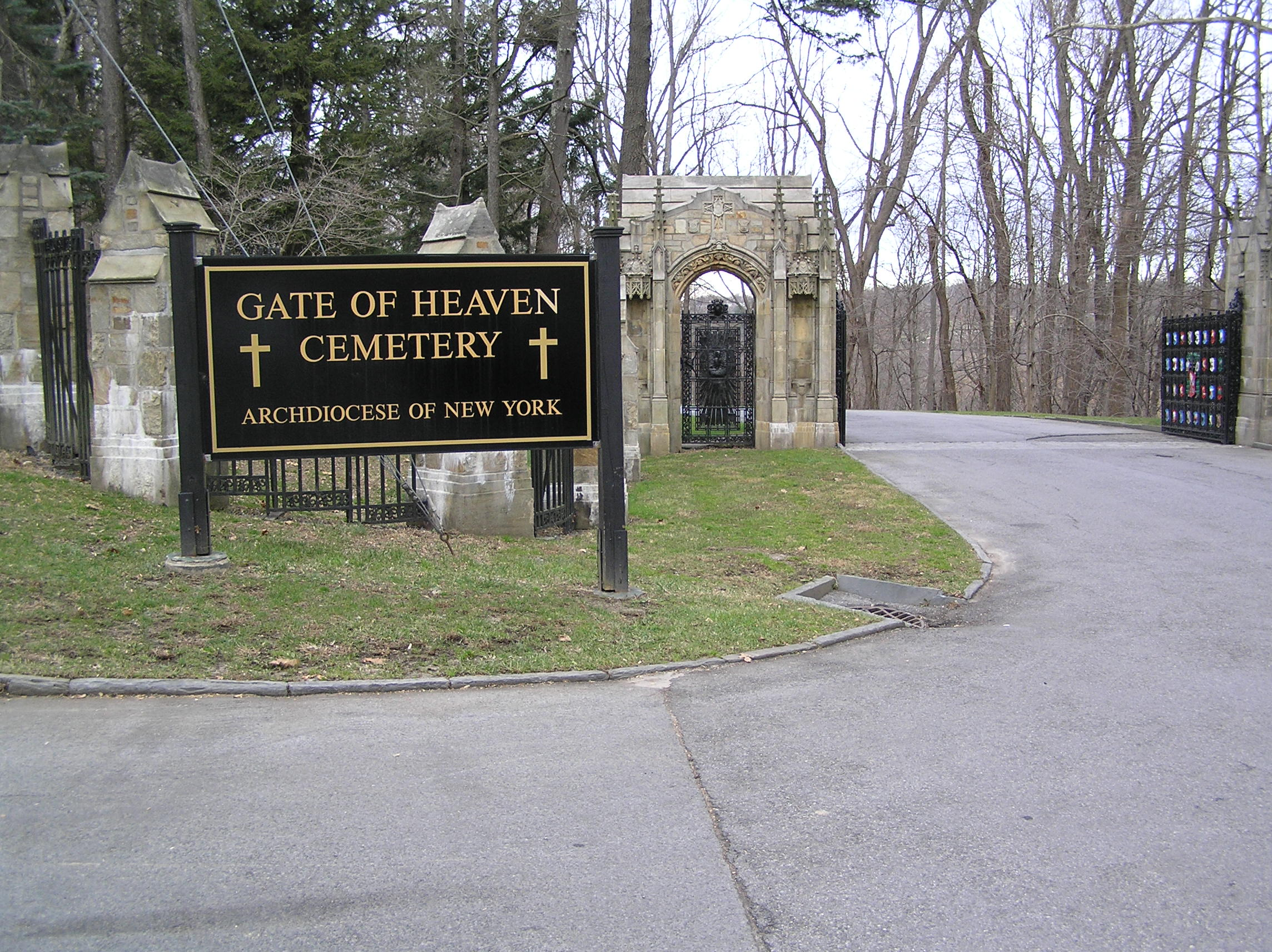
- The upper entrance to Gate of Heaven Cemetery
- Interactive map of Gate of Heaven Cemetery

Details
- Established: 1917
- Location: Hawthorne, New York
- Type: Roman Catholic
- Owned by: Roman Catholic Archdiocese of New York

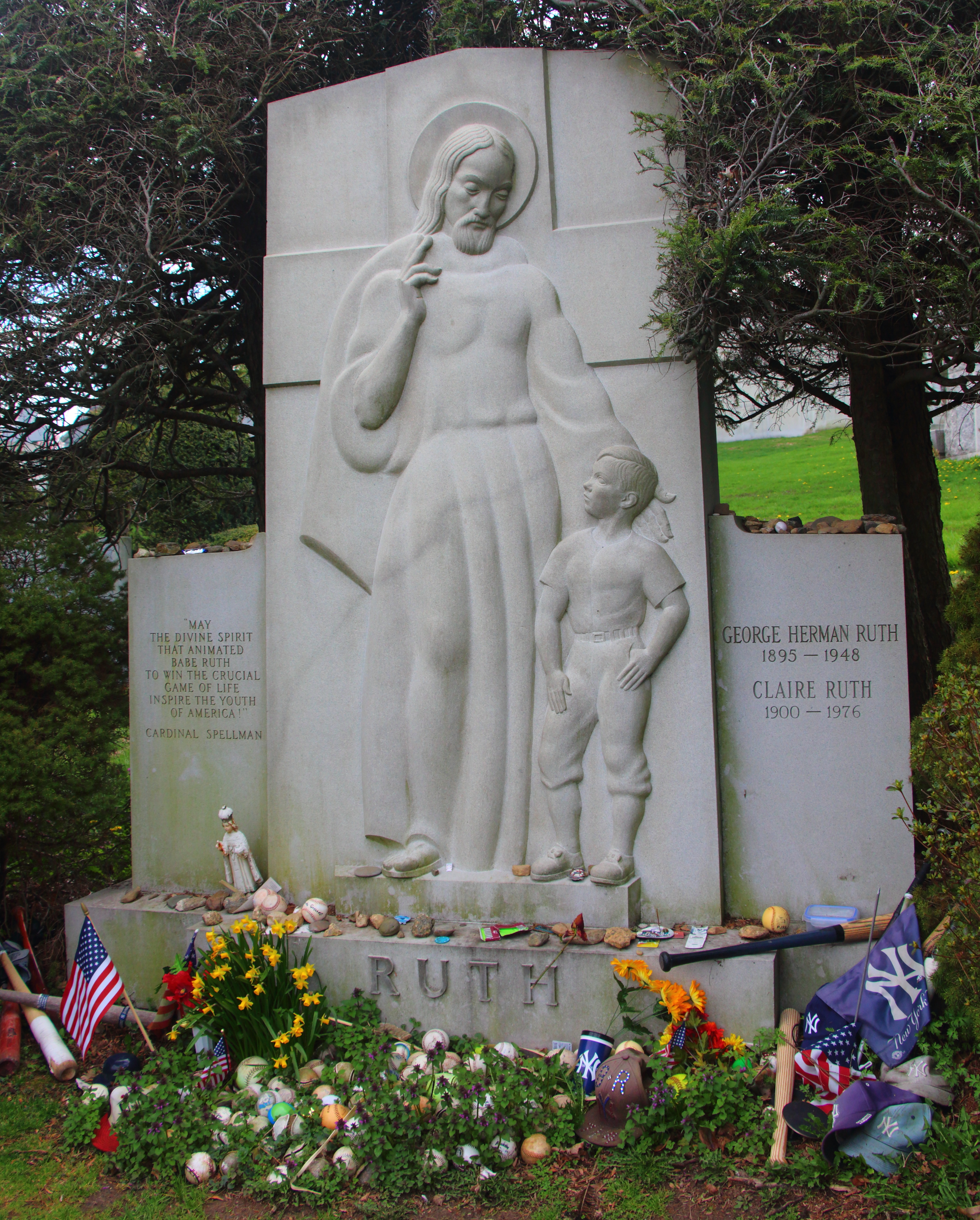
Babe Ruth gravesite: Section 25, Plot 1115, Graves 3 & 4.

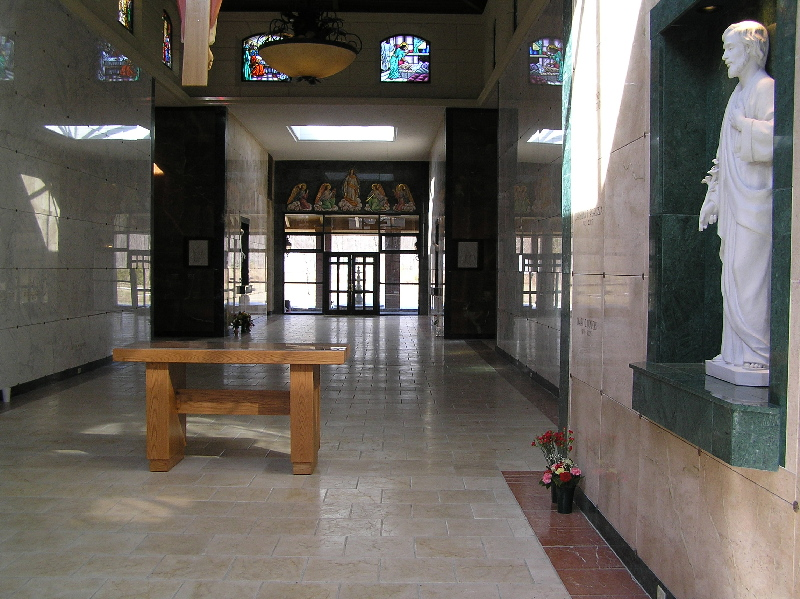
The new indoor building of Our Lady Queen of Peace Mausoleum

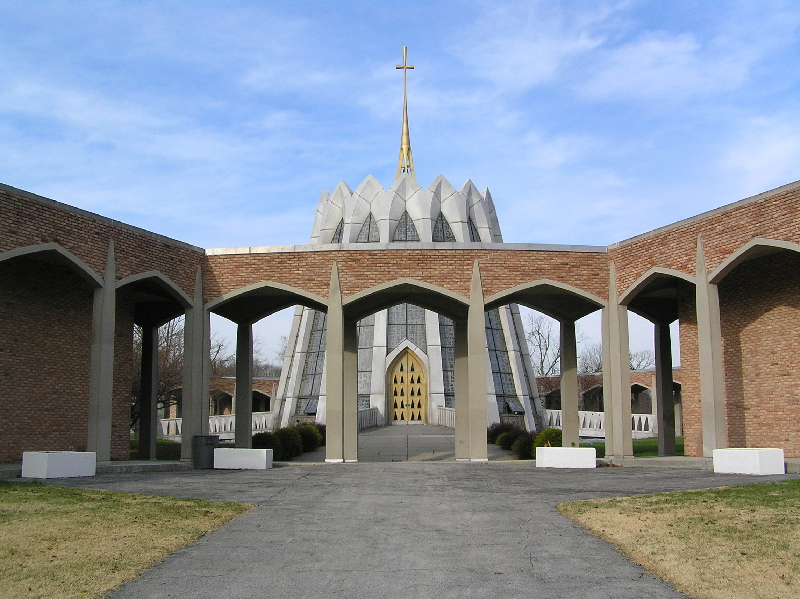
Garden Mausoleum with Saint Francis of Assisi Chapel in the background

Gate of Heaven Cemetery, approximately 25 miles (40 km) north of New York City, was established in 1917 at 10 West Stevens Avenue in Hawthorne, Westchester County, New York, as a Catholic burial site. Several famous individuals are buried here including actors, athletes and politicians. Among its residents is baseball player Babe Ruth, whose grave has an epitaph by Cardinal Francis Spellman and is almost always adorned by many baseballs, bats and caps. Adjacent to the Garden Mausoleum is the Metro-North Railroad's Harlem Division Mount Pleasant station. One train each way stops here on weekdays, and three trains each way stop here on weekends.

== Notable interments ==
- Robert Abplanalp (1922–2003), inventor of the aerosol spray valve
- Fred Allen (1894–1956), actor and comedian
- Odette Barsa (1901–1975), Syrian-born American fashion designer
- Mario Biaggi (1917–2015), decorated policeman and US Congressman
- Spruille Braden (1894–1978), diplomat
- Ralph Branca (1926–2016), professional baseball pitcher who gave up the Shot Heard 'Round the World to Bobby Thomson in 1951
- Heywood Broun (1888–1939), journalist
- Alfred Bryan (1871–1958), songwriter
- Ronald Paul Bucca (1954–2001), New York City Fire Department Marshal killed in the September 11 attacks
- Charles A. Buckley (1890–1967), United States Representative from New York
- Frances W. "Billie" Cagney, née Vernon (1899–1994), dancer and wife of James Cagney
- James Cagney (1899–1986), actor
- Charles J. Carroll (1882–1942), lawyer and politician
- Emil A. Ciccotelli (1929–1998), Chief of Detectives New York City Police Department
- Mary Higgins Clark (1927–2020), novelist
- Bob Considine (1906–1975), author
- Mark J. Coyle (1965–2007), political consultant
- Angelo "Gyp" DeCarlo (1902–1973), mobster
- Philip D'Antoni (1929–2018), film producer
- Dudley Digges (1880–1947), stage and film actor
- Bella Dodd (1904–1969), activist, teacher and attorney
- Dorothy Donnelly (1876–1928), actress, playwright, librettist, producer and director
- Jessica Dragonette (1900–1980), singer
- James Farley (1888–1976), Postmaster General and advisor to President Franklin D. Roosevelt
- Joseph T. Flynn (1894–1935), World War I pilot, New York State Assemblyman, lawyer
- Samuel J. Foley (1891–1951), attorney, judge and Bronx County District Attorney
- Bill Froats (1930–1998), baseball player
- Henry Jacques Gaisman, philanthropist and inventor of the safety razor
- Ralph W. Gallagher (1881–1952), chairman of Standard Oil of New Jersey
- Alexander Gettler (1883–1968), toxicologist and "the father of forensic toxicology in America"
- Federico García Rodríguez (1859–1945), father of Federico García Lorca
- Hector Guimard (1867–1942), French architect and most prominent representative of the Art Nouveau movement in France
- Ernest E. L. Hammer (December 17, 1884 – March 10, 1970), Administrator of the Bronx, Supreme Court Justice of the State of New York, presided over Bruno Hauptman trial for extradition in the Lindbergh baby kidnapping
- Frank Hardart (1884–1972), son of founder of Horn & Hardart automat
- Julie Haydon (1910–1994), actress
- Martin J. Healy (1883–1942), member of the New York State Assembly and New York City Board of Aldermen
- Anna Held (1872–1918), actress and singer
- Portland Hoffa (1905–1990), actress
- Phillips Holmes (1907–1942), actor, Royal Canadian Air Force airman of World War II (recorded by Commonwealth War Graves Commission with younger age of 31.)
- Bess Houdini (1876–1943), wife of magician Harry Houdini
- Peter Hujar (1934–1987), photographer and artist
- G. Murray Hulbert (1881–1950), United States Representative from New York
- Ethel D. Jacobs (1910–2001), thoroughbred racehorse owner
- Peggy Hopkins Joyce (1893–1957), actress and socialite
- Arthur Judson (1881–1975), co-founder of CBS
- Owen M. Kiernan (1867–1940), member of the New York State Assembly
- Dorothy Kilgallen (1913–1965), journalist and television personality
- Richard Kollmar (1910–1971), Broadway producer
- T. Vincent Learson (1912–1996), IBM chairman and Ambassador at Large for Law of the Sea Matters
- Ernesto Lecuona (1896–1963), composer and songwriter
- Augustus C. Long (1904–2001), chairman of Texaco
- James J. Lyons (1890–1966), Bronx Borough President from 1934 to 1962
- Ann Mara (1929–2015), wife of Wellington Mara
- Tim Mara (1887–1959), founder of the NFL New York Giants
- Wellington Mara (1916–2005), owner of the NFL New York Giants
- Billy Martin (1928–1989), Major League Baseball player/manager
- Malachi Martin (1921–1999), Irish Catholic priest and writer
- Anne O'Hare McCormick (1880–1954), Pulitzer Prize-winning journalist
- Pat McDonald (1871–1954), Olympic champion weight-thrower
- Charles B. McLaughlin (1884–1947), attorney, judge and Bronx County District Attorney
- John McSherry (1944–1996), Major League Baseball umpire
- Sal Mineo (1939–1976), actor
- Condé Nast (1873–1942), publisher
- George Jean Nathan (1882–1958), drama critic
- Elliott Nugent (1896–1980), actor, director and screenwriter
- John P. O'Brien (1873–1951), politician and mayor of New York City
- Richard W. O'Neill (1898–1986), soldier and Medal of Honor recipient in World War I
- Fulton Oursler (1893–1952), writer
- Lester W. Patterson (1893–1947), Bronx assemblyman and county judge.
- Westbrook Pegler (1894–1969), Pulitzer Prize-winning journalist
- Justin Pierce (1975–2000), actor and skateboarder
- Mike Quill (1905–1966), founder of Transport Workers Union of America
- Dan Reeves (1912–1971), former owner of the NFL Los Angeles Rams
- Michael Restel (1924–2014), World War II Navy Veteran
- Babe Ruth (1895–1948), Hall of Fame baseball player
- Claire Merritt Ruth (1900–1976), wife of baseball great Babe Ruth
- Dutch Schultz (1902–1935), mobster
- Charles M. Schwab (1862–1939), steel magnate (remains later moved to St. Michael Cemetery in Loretto, Pennsylvania)
- Arnold Skaaland (1925–2007), professional wrestler
- Spyros Skouras (1893–1971), former president of 20th Century-Fox
- Lisa Steinberg (1981–1987), child murder victim
- Daniel V. Sullivan (1886–1966), attorney, judge and Bronx County District Attorney
- Henry Waters Taft (1859–1945), lawyer and author, brother of President William Howard Taft
- Mike Tiernan (1867–1918), professional baseball player New York Giants
- James H. Torrens (1874–1952), politician
- Vito Valentinetti (1928–2021), Major League Baseball pitcher
- Jimmy Walker (1881–1946), mayor of New York City
- Bill Wendell (1924–1999), television announcer
- William B. Widnall (1906–1983), former US Congressman
- Malcolm Wilson (1914–2000), Governor of New York for whom the previous Tappan Zee Bridge over the Hudson River was named
- Sal Yvars (1924–2008), Major League Baseball catcher

== Image gallery ==
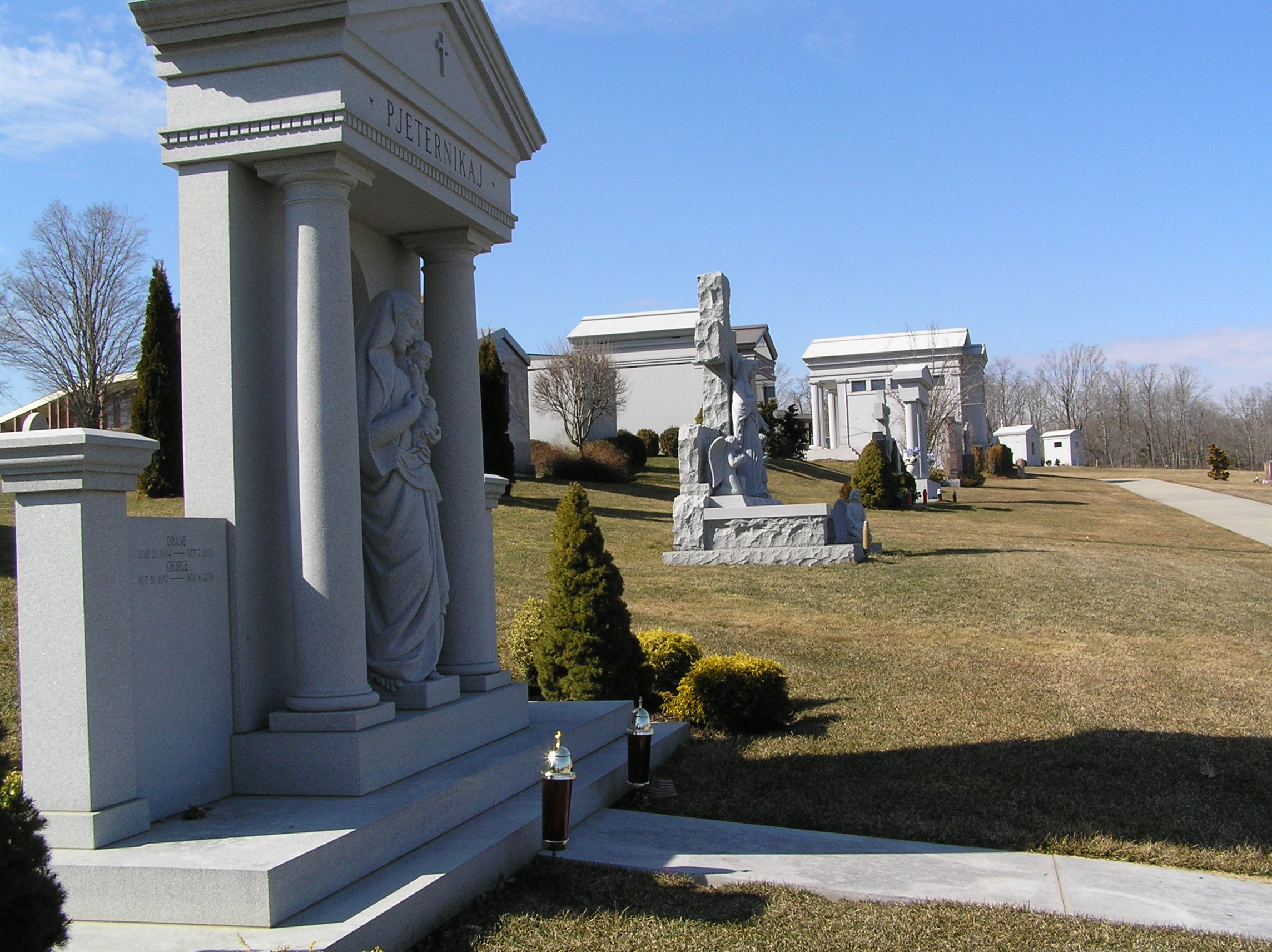
New monuments

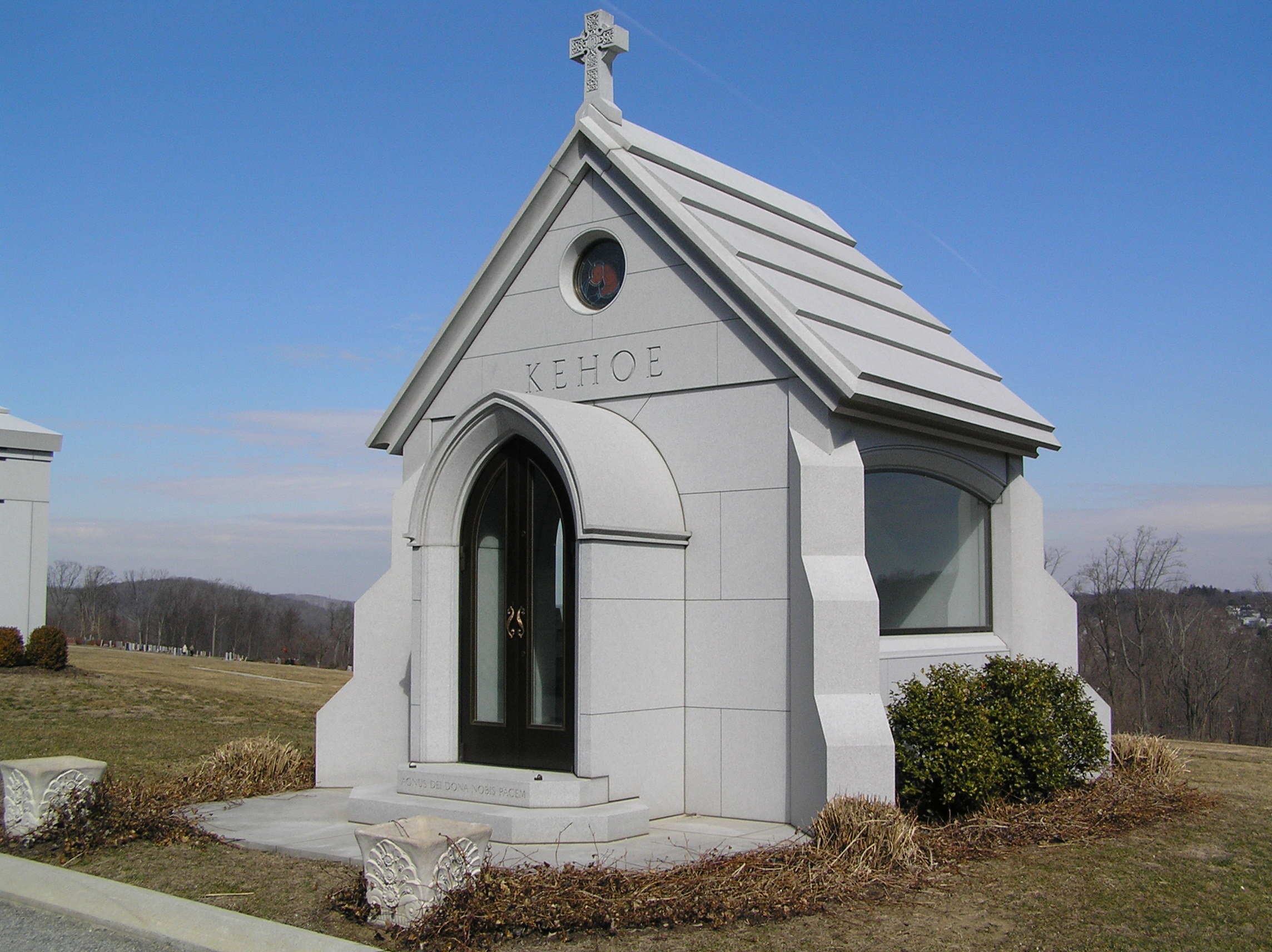
Kehoe mausoleum

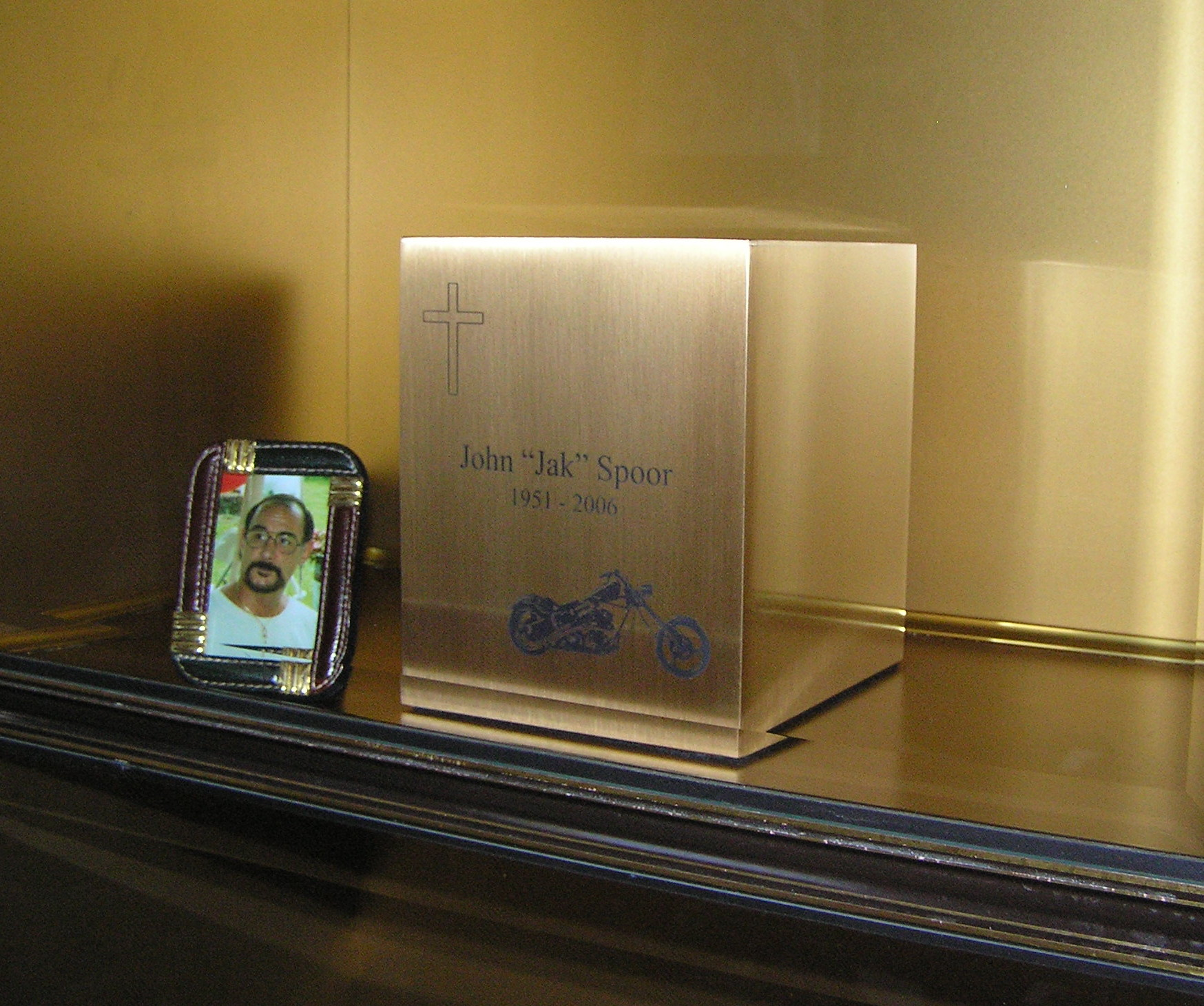
Cremation urn

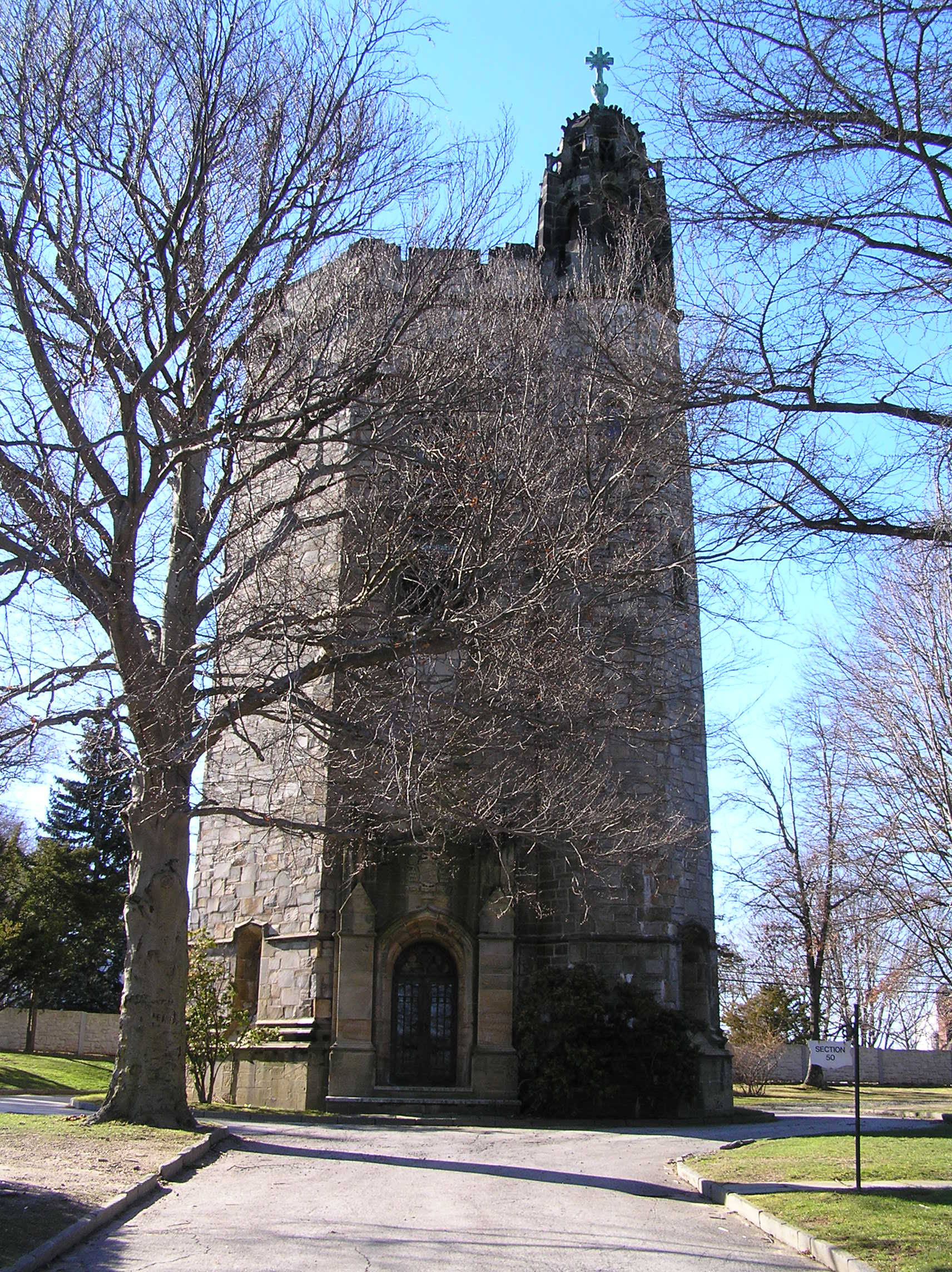
The tower near Bradhurst Avenue

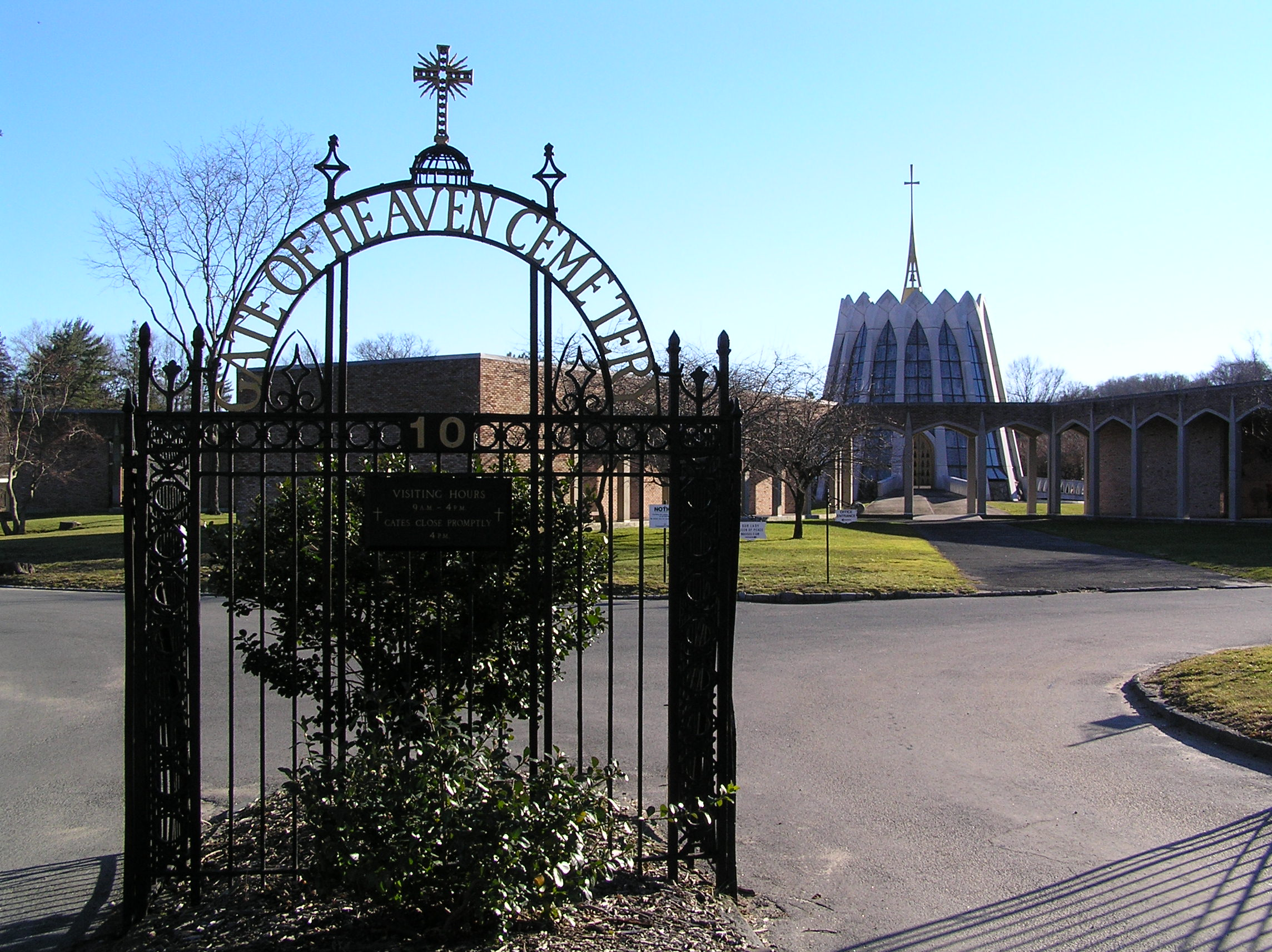
Main entrance

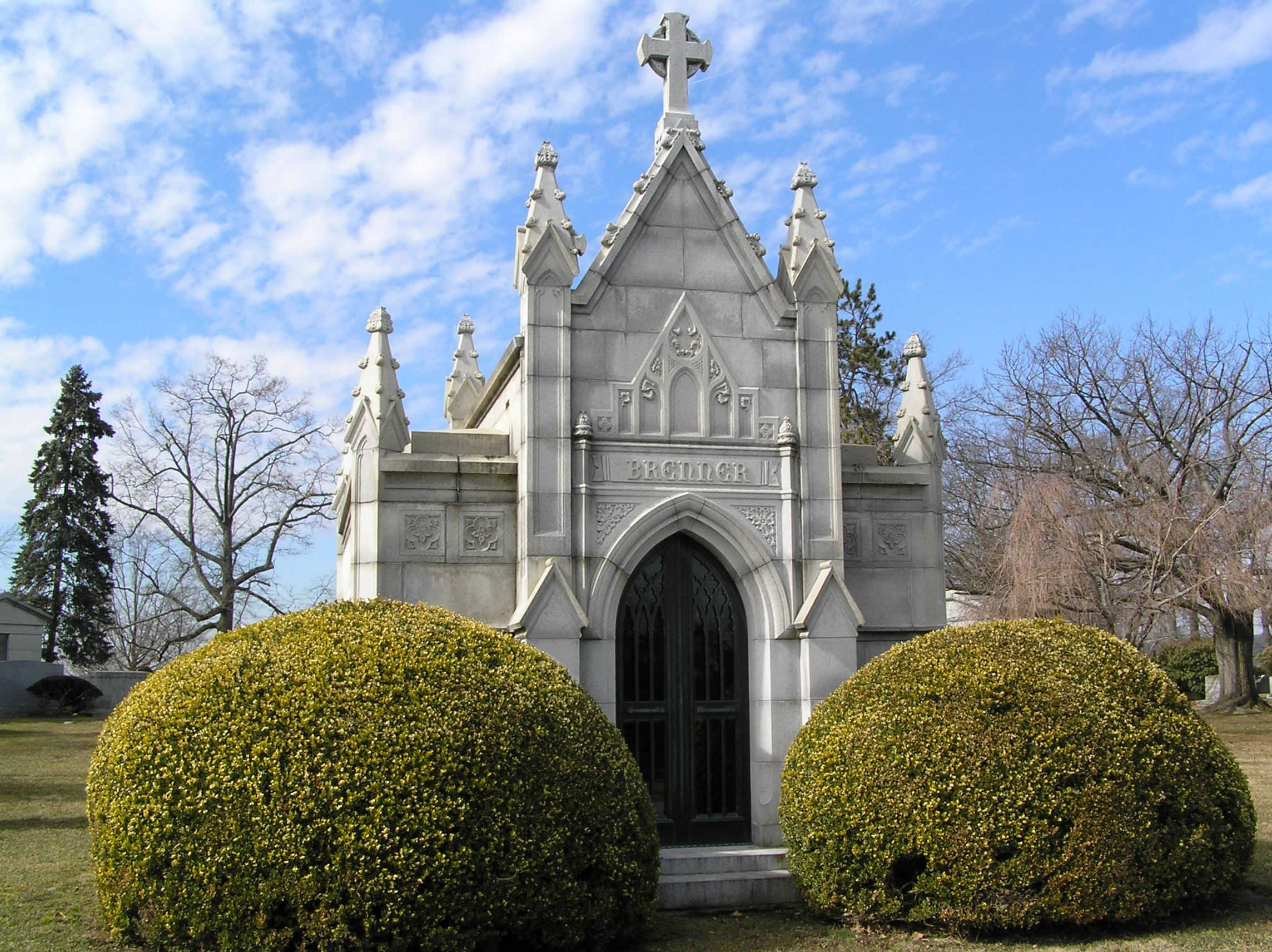
Brenner mausoleum

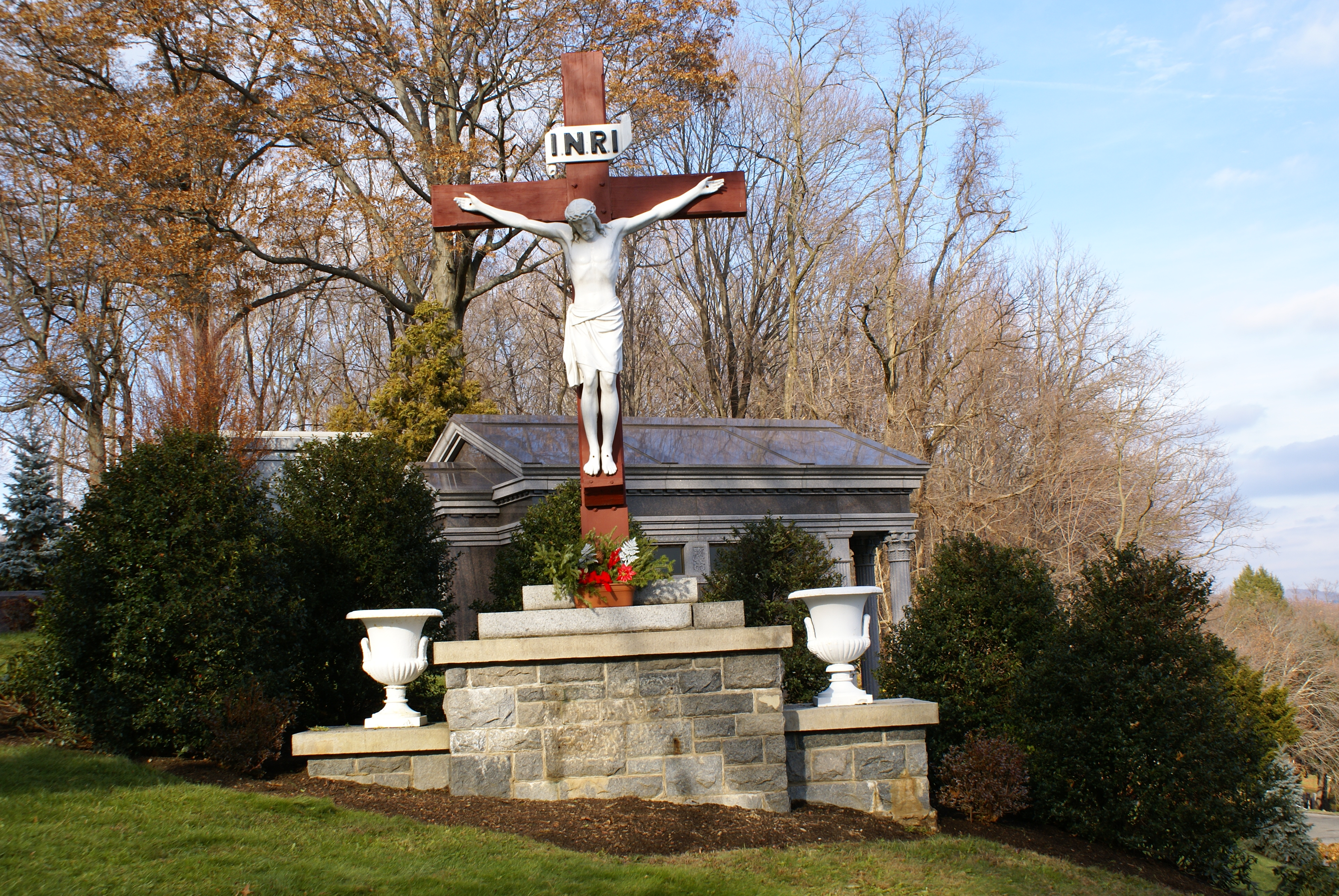
The shrine near the grave of Babe Ruth

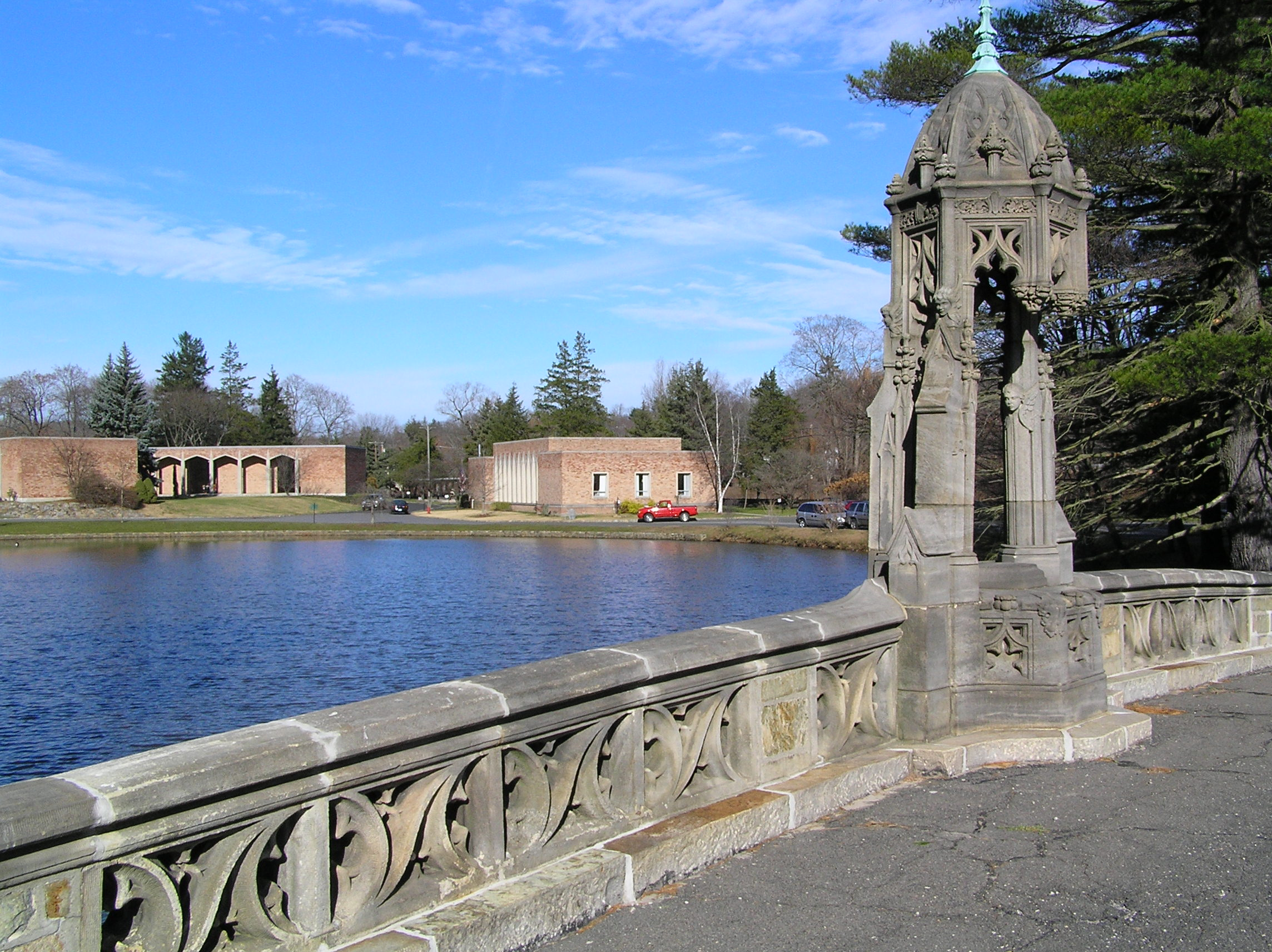
The Gothic Bridge

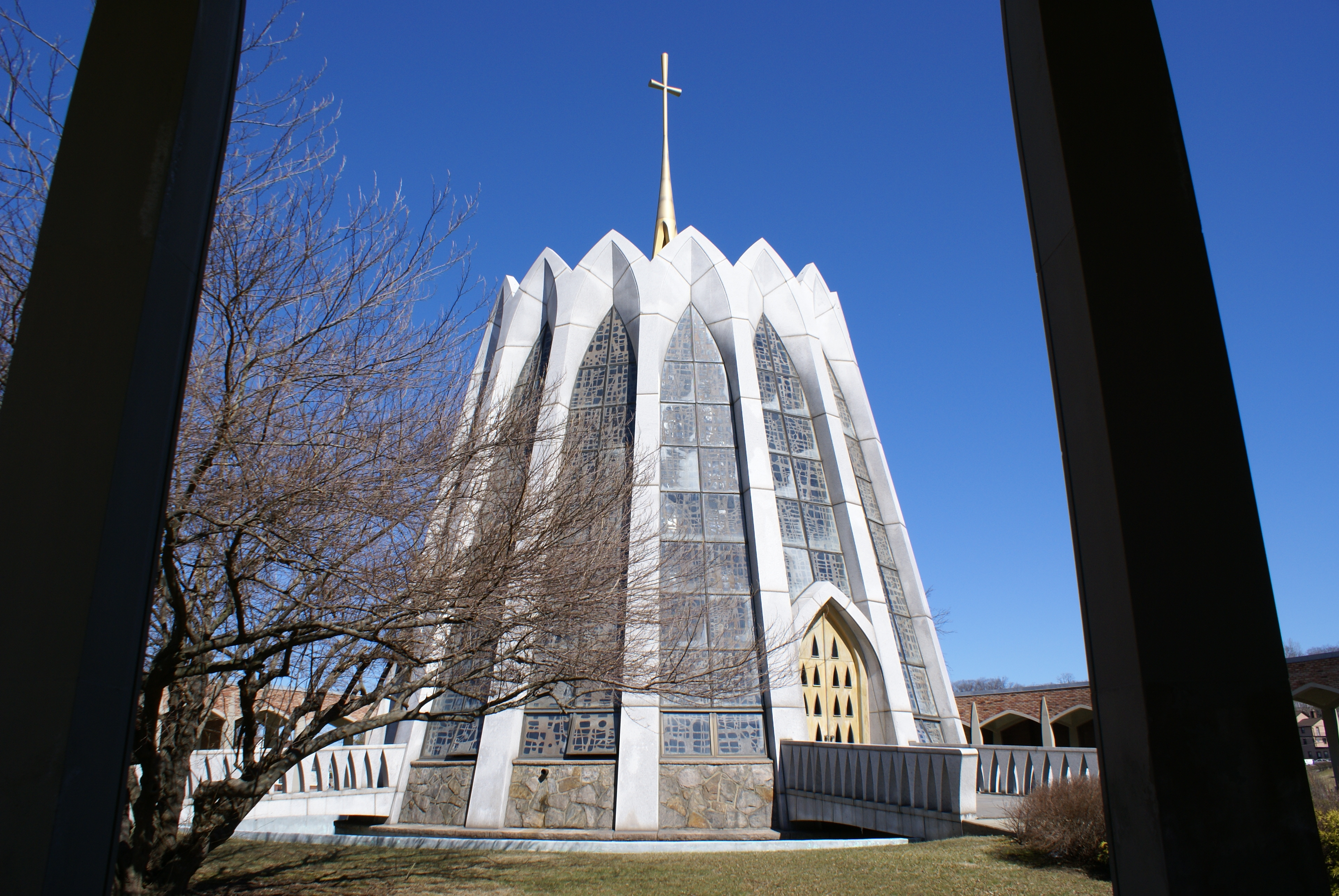
Saint Francis of Assisi Chapel

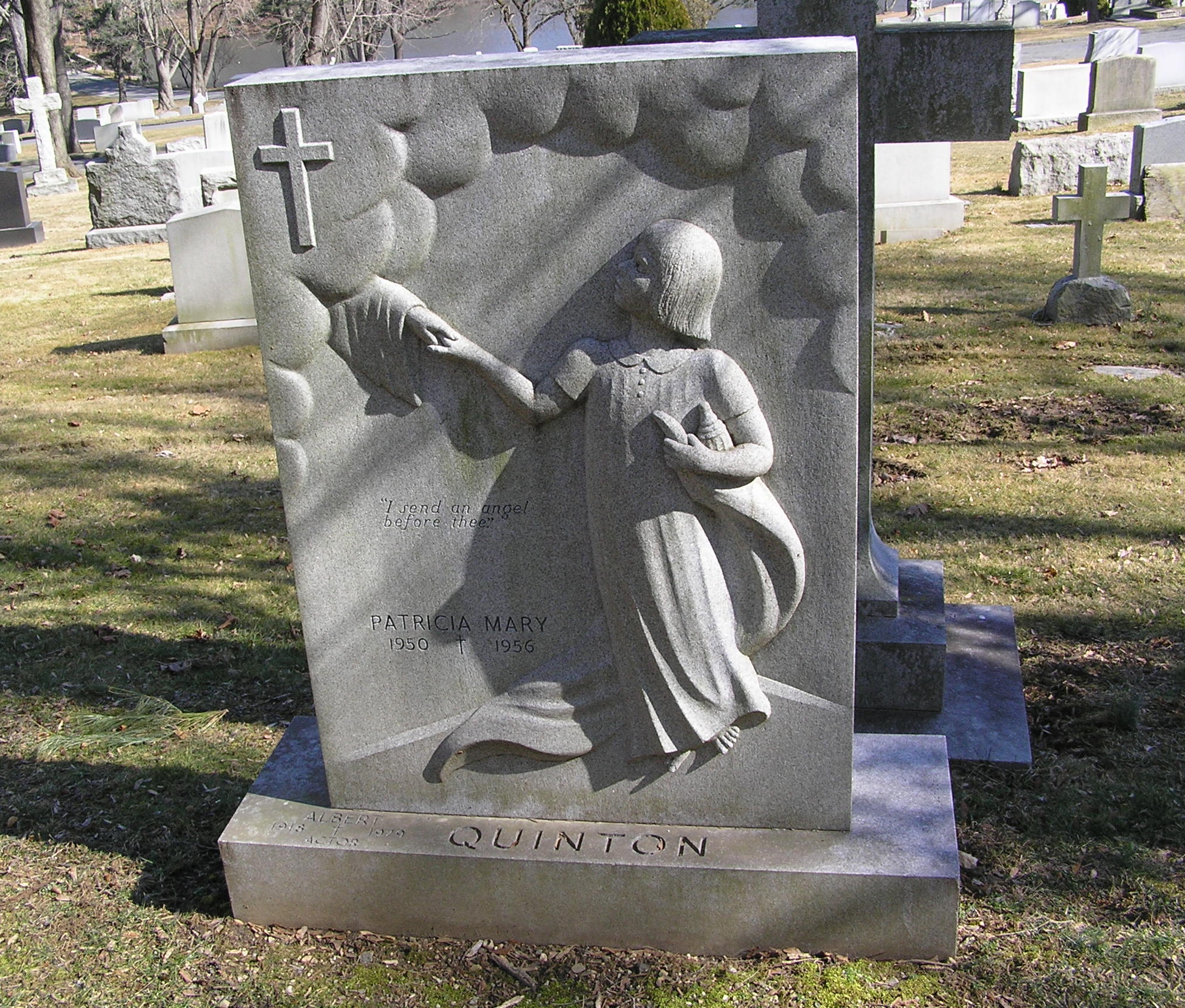
Child tombstone

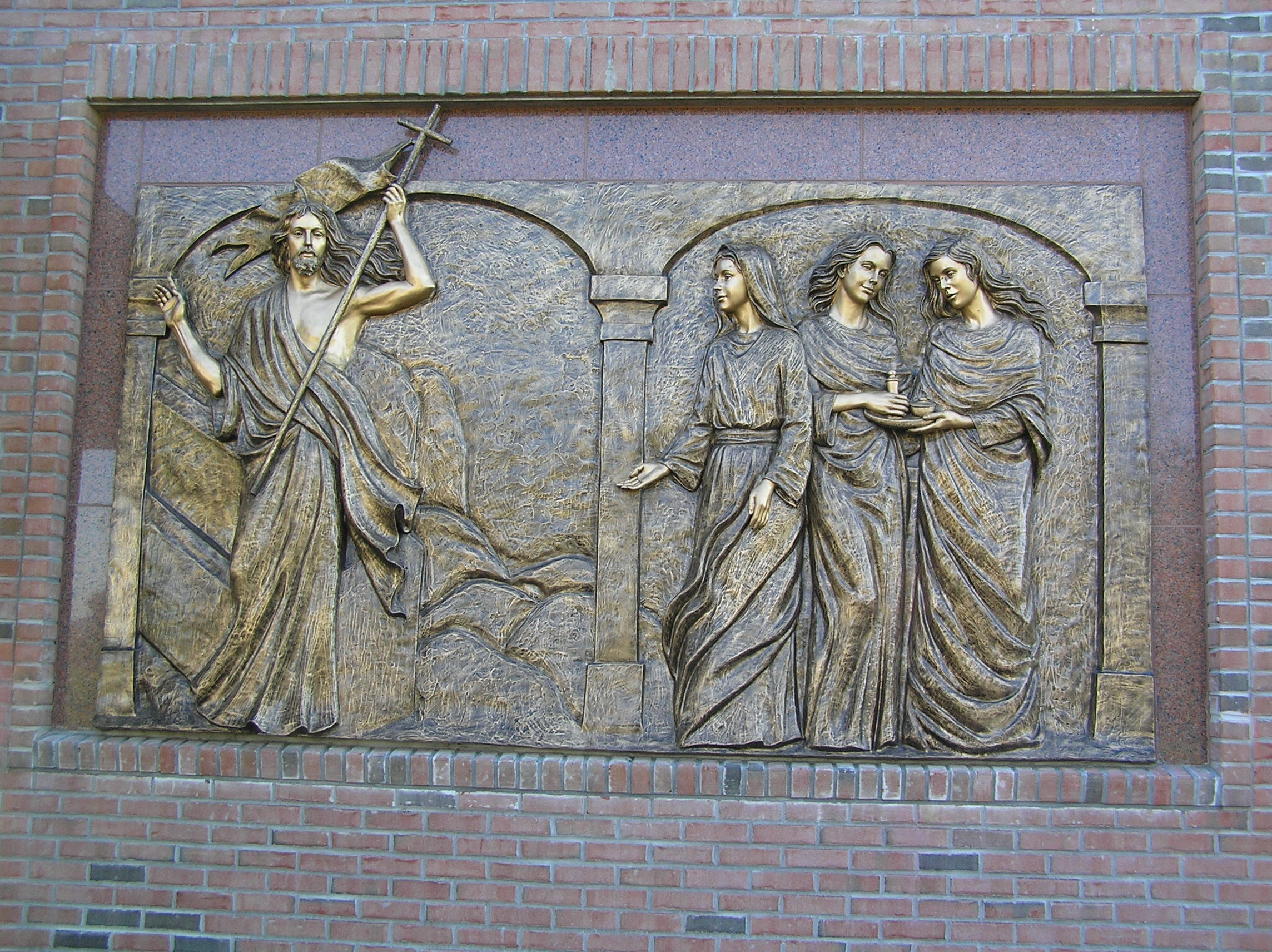
Frieze at entrance to Queen of Peace Mausoleum

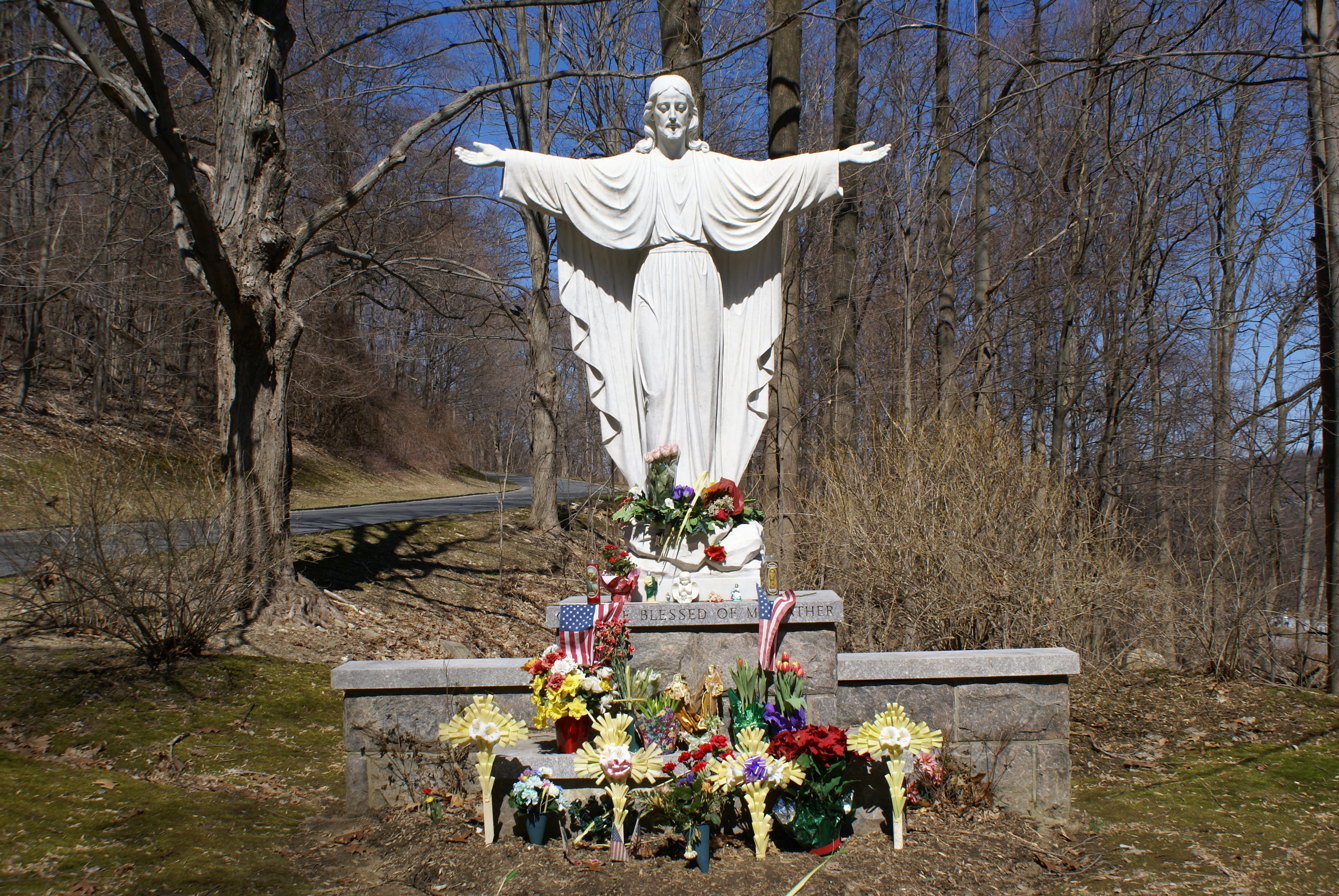
Statue at Upper Entrance

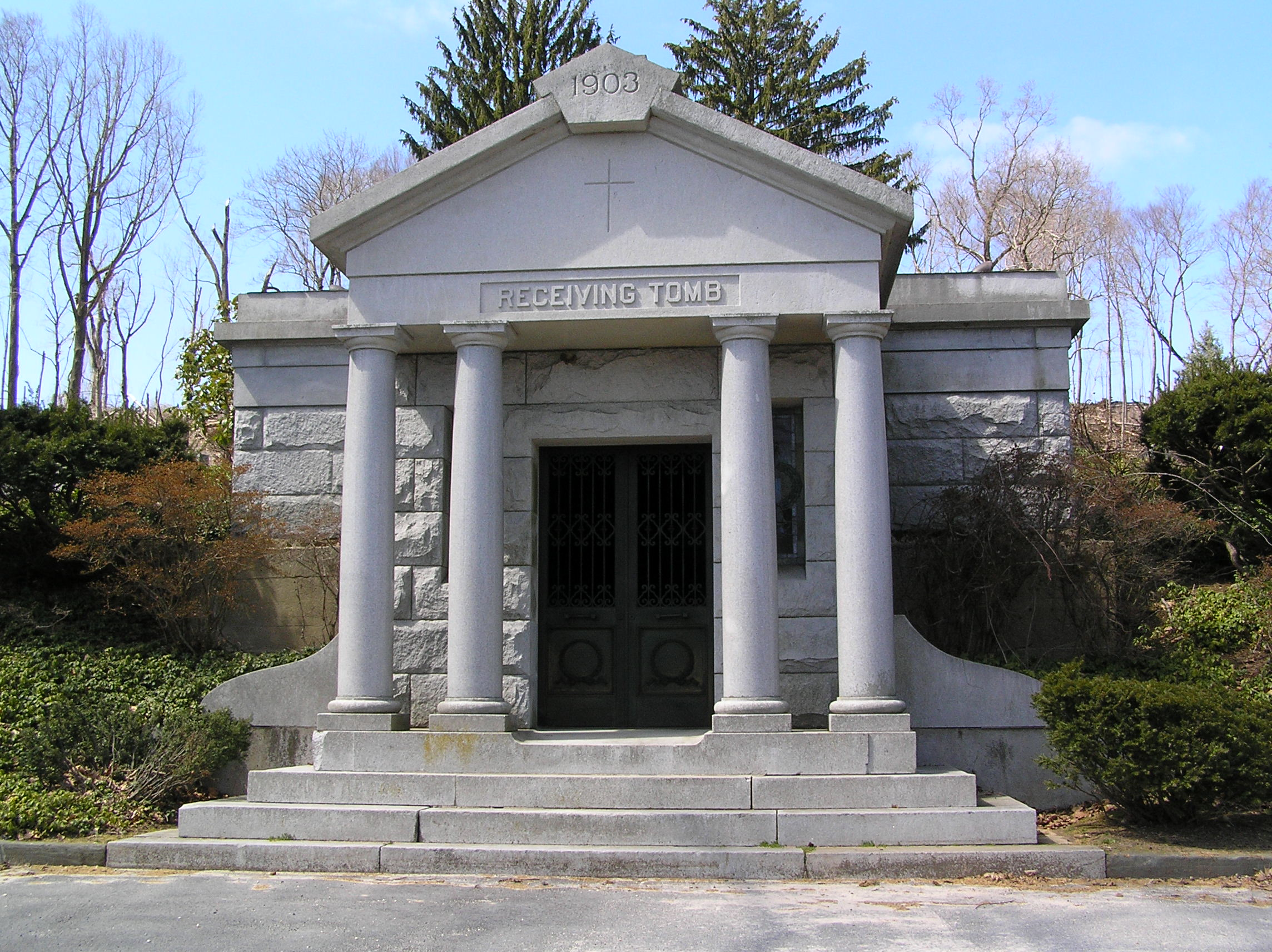
The Receiving Tomb
