= Federal Hill (film) =

- Directed by: Michael Corrente
- Written by: Michael Corrente
- Produced by: Richard Crudo
- Starring: Nicholas Turturro; Anthony DeSando; Libby Langdon; Michael Raynor; Jason Andrews; Robert Turano; Frank Vincent
- Music by: David Bravo; Bob Held
- Release date: February 12, 1994
- Country: United States
- Language: English

Federal Hill is a 1994 American drama film written and directed by Michael Corrente. It was shot in black and white for $80,000.

== Plot ==
A young hoodlum becomes enamored of a college coed in this tale of five longtime friends in Providence, R.I.
