= Odette Barsa =

Syrian-born American fashion designer (1901–1975)

- Born: Odette Matouk; 29 December 1901; Damascus, Syria
- Died: 8 January 1975 (aged 73); New York City, New York, U.S.
- Burial place: Gate of Heaven Cemetery, Hawthorne, New York, U.S.
- Occupations: Lingerie designer, entrepreneur
- Spouse: Simon Barsa (m. 1922)
- Children: 3

Odette Barsa (née Matouk; 29 December 1901 – 8 January 1975) was a Syrian-born American lingerie designer, and the founder of the eponymous label.

== Life and career ==
Odette Barsa was born as Odette Matouk on 29 December 1901, in Damascus, Syria. She immigrated to the United States in 1921. She married Simon Barsa (1888–1977) in 1972 in Rye, New York, a Syrian-born businessman. They had three children, Gabriel, Albert, and Nadia, all born in New York state.

After the 1929 stock market crash, her husband's business struggled, so she started making products. In the 1930 census, he was described as "Manufacturer, Rugs". Barsa started her lingerie business in 1931. In 1942, the company registered her name in the United States Patent Office, and in 1944 they patented her new logo. Over time her business grew to occupy a whole floor of 16 East 34th Street, New York City.

Barsa died on 8 January 1975, in New York City. Her business continued for some time after her death, run by her sons.

Her designs are represented today in the holdings of the Texas Fashion Collection, the Victoria and Albert Museum, and the Goldstein Museum of Design.
