= Brooklyn Rules =

- Promotional poster
- Directed by: Michael Corrente
- Written by: Terence Winter
- Produced by: Michael Corrente; Marisa Polvino; Richard Lewis
- Starring: Freddie Prinze Jr.; Scott Caan; Mena Suvari; Jerry Ferrara; Alec Baldwin; Monica Keena; Robert Turano
- Cinematography: Richard P. Crudo
- Edited by: Katie Sanford
- Music by: Benny Rietveld; Benson Taylor
- Production companies: City Lights Productions; Eagle Beach Productions; Straight Up Films; Southpaw Entertainment; Cataland Films
- Distributed by: The Weinstein Company
- Release dates: April 30, 2007 (Boston); May 18, 2007 (United States)
- Running time: 95 minutes
- Country: United States
- Language: English
- Budget: $8 million
- Box office: $458,232

Brooklyn Rules is a 2007 American crime drama film directed by Michael Corrente, written by Terence Winter and starring Alec Baldwin, Scott Caan, Freddie Prinze Jr., Jerry Ferrara and Mena Suvari. The plot follows a group of lifelong friends who get involved with the Brooklyn mafia in the 1980s.

== Plot ==
In 1985 Michael (Freddie Prinze Jr.), the narrator, is a lovable charmer with the soul of a con man who successfully scams his way into the pre-law program at Columbia University. In contrast to Michael's desire to leave the Brooklyn streets behind, his close friend Carmine (Scott Caan) is a handsome lady-killer who is enamored of the Mafia lifestyle and wants only to stay there. Rounding out the trio is Bobby (Jerry Ferrara), an endearing cheapskate who longs for a simple life of working at the Post Office and settling down with his fiancée. While at Columbia, Michael falls for a beautiful young student named Ellen (Mena Suvari), a society girl whom he initially wins over with his preppy schoolboy cover. As their relationship blossoms, leaving the streets behind seems increasingly possible, but when Carmine catches the eye of Caesar (Alec Baldwin), a feared Gambino family capo who controls their neighborhood, Michael and Bobby are drawn into that world despite their reluctance to get involved.

== Cast ==
- Alec Baldwin as Caesar
- Freddie Prinze Jr. as Michael
  - Paulo Araujo as young Michael
- Scott Caan as Carmine
  - Ty Thomas Reed as young Carmine
- Jerry Ferrara as Bobby
  - Daniel Tay as young Bobby
- Mena Suvari as Ellen
- Chris Caldovino as Philly
- Monica Keena as Amy
- Annie Golden as Dottie
- Ty Reed as Young Carmine
- Benny Salerno as the Doorman

== Reception ==
Brooklyn Rules received mixed reviews from critics. On Rotten Tomatoes the film has an approval rating of 45%, based on 40 reviews, with an average rating of 5.3/10. The site's critical consensus reads, "Brooklyn Rules' premise is old hat now, but strong performances from Alec Baldwin and the supporting cast are reasons enough to watch." On Metacritic the film has a score of 53 out of 100, based on 13 critics, indicating "mixed or average" reviews.
