= Richard W. O'Neill =

U.S. Army Medal of Honor recipient

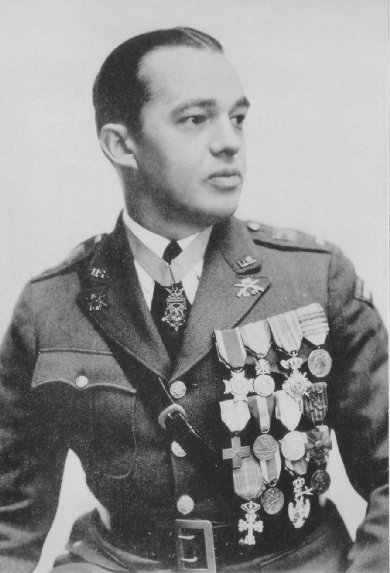
- From 1935's Forward--March!: The Photographic Record of America in the World War and the Post War Social Upheaval
- Born: August 28, 1897; New York City, New York
- Died: April 9, 1982 (aged 84); Valhalla, New York
- Burial place: Gate of Heaven Cemetery, Hawthorne, New York
- Military career
- Allegiance: United States of America
- Branch: United States Army
- Service years: 1916-1923
- Rank: Sergeant (at time of Medal of Honor action); Second Lieutenant (at time of discharge)
- Service number: 89741
- Units: Company D, 165th Infantry Regiment, 42nd Division
- Conflicts: Pancho Villa Expedition; World War I
- Awards: Medal of Honor
- Other work: Liquor store owner Veterans' advocate

Richard William O'Neill (August 28, 1897 – April 9, 1982) was a soldier in the United States Army who served during World War I. He received the Medal of Honor for his actions, and went on to receive numerous other decorations to recognize his wartime heroism.

Born and educated in New York City, O'Neill joined the New York National Guard's 69th Infantry Regiment in 1916, and served with the unit in Texas during the Pancho Villa Expedition. He continued to serve with his regiment during World War I, when it was re-designated as the 165th Infantry. He received the Medal of Honor to recognize his heroism during combat along the Ourcq River in July 1918; O'Neill was wounded more than 10 times, and all the soldiers he was leading were killed. Despite his wounds, O'Neill made his way back to friendly lines to pass on information about enemy positions, which enabled U.S. troops to successfully press the attack. When he was awarded the medal in 1921, he was still recuperating at Fordham Hospital, so the presentation was made by Ferdinand Foch at Fordham University. He later received additional valor awards from several foreign countries.

After recuperating, O'Neill worked in construction and as a salesman before purchasing a liquor store, which he operated until his retirement. During World War II he worked for the Office of Strategic Services; the agency's head, William J. Donovan, had been O'Neill's World War I commander, and Donovan employed O'Neill in an effort to identify and apprehend potential German spies or collaborators in the northeastern United States. O'Neill was also active in several veterans organizations, including the Veterans of Foreign Wars and the American Legion.

O'Neill died in Valhalla, New York and was buried at Gate of Heaven Cemetery in Hawthorne, New York.

== Early life ==
O'Neill was born in New York City on August 28, 1897, the son of John O'Neill, an Irish immigrant from Liverpool, England, and Ella O'Neill. He was educated in New York City, and began to box professionally; he won 12 fights during his brief career. At age 18 he joined the New York National Guard's 69th Infantry Regiment. He served in Texas during the Pancho Villa Expedition, and shortly after returning home, the regiment was mobilized for World War I and re-designated as the 165th Infantry Regiment.

== World War I ==
By now a sergeant, O'Neill served with his regiment in France. During a combat action along the Ourcq River on July 30, 1918, O'Neill led a detachment of soldiers in a reconnaissance to determine the location of German artillery positions. O'Neill was wounded repeatedly, and the other soldiers of his detachment were killed, but O'Neill succeeded in returning to friendly lines and providing details on the location of the German artillery. As a result, U.S. troops were able to destroy the positions and successfully press the attack. O'Neill was hospitalized, but later violated doctor's orders and returned to his unit, serving until he was wounded again. At the end of the war in November 1918, O'Neill was still hospitalized in the United States.

== Post-World War I ==
Following the end of the war, O'Neill continued to convalesce. Doctors recommended amputation of his legs, which O'Neill refused, and he was eventually able to walk unaided. According to family members, for the rest of his life O'Neill would occasionally remove from his legs pieces of shrapnel that worked their way to the surface of his skin.

In 1921, O'Neill was awarded the Medal of Honor to recognize his heroism in the Ourcq River action. Because he was still recuperating at Fordham Hospital, the Army permitted Ferdinand Foch to make the presentation in a ceremony at Fordham University. In addition to the Medal of Honor, O'Neill later received medals from several foreign countries in recognition of his heroic actions. Also in 1921, O'Neill was commissioned as a second lieutenant in the New York National Guard; he held this rank until resigning from the military in 1923.

== Career ==
After his recovery, O'Neill attended extension courses in construction at the City College of New York, and worked as a concrete pourer during the construction of the George Washington Bridge. He later worked in sales, and then purchased a liquor store near the Waldorf Astoria Hotel, which he operated until retiring in the early 1960s.

O'Neill also became active in New York's Republican Party, including speeches on behalf of candidates, and speeches at fundraising dinners and other events.

== World War II ==
During World War II, O'Neill was employed by the Office of Strategic Services. The head of the OSS, William J. Donovan, had been O'Neill's World War I commander, and he hired O'Neill as part of an initiative to investigate potential German collaborators in New England and New York.

== Veterans advocate ==
O'Neill was active in several veterans' organizations, including the Catholic War Veterans, Disabled American Veterans, Veterans of Foreign Wars, and American Legion. In 1932, he resigned as state chairman of the Disabled American Veterans because of disagreement with other veterans over the activities of the Bonus Army. O'Neill opposed early payment of the bonus due to World War I veterans who advocated early payment in order to help them cope with the effects of the Great Depression; the DAV favored it by a vote of 3 to 1. O'Neill argued that the payments would be too small to make a meaningful difference to the veterans who received it, and that the government should do more to aid them with job creation and medical care.

O'Neill served as executive director of the Congressional Medal of Honor Society. In addition, he made frequent public appearances, including serving as grand marshal of Memorial Day parades and marching at 1960s demonstrations in support of U.S. involvement in the Vietnam War.

== Death and burial ==
O'Neill died at a nursing home in Valhalla, New York on April 9, 1982. He was buried at Gate of Heaven Cemetery in Hawthorne, New York.

== Family ==
In 1921, O'Neill married Estelle Johnson (1897-1985); they were the parents of a son, William Donovan O'Neill (1927-2009).

O'Neill's sister Rose was married to Edward J. Geaney, who was also a World War I veteran of the 69th Infantry. Geaney was awarded the Distinguished Service Cross for heroism for the same action for which O'Neill received the Medal of Honor. While serving as a company first sergeant, and though wounded himself, Geaney succeeded in rescuing a wounded officer who was unable to move and so vulnerable to continued enemy fire. Geaney received his medal during the same ceremony at which O'Neill was honored.

== Legacy ==
In 1975, Governor Hugh Carey designated an office building at the National Guard's Camp Smith training facility as O'Neill Hall, in honor of Richard O'Neill.

== Medal of Honor Citation ==
Rank and organization: Sergeant, U.S. Army, Company D, 165th Infantry, 42d Division. Place and date: On the Ourcq River, France; July 30, 1918. Entered service at: New York, New York. Birth: August 28, 1898; New York, New, York. General Orders: War Department, General Orders No. 30 (July 15, 1921).

Citation:

In advance of an assaulting line, he attacked a detachment of about 25 of the enemy. In the ensuing hand-to-hand encounter he sustained pistol wounds, but heroically continued in the advance, during which he received additional wounds: but, with great physical effort, he remained in active command of his detachment. Being again wounded, he was forced by weakness and loss of blood to be evacuated, but insisted upon being taken first to the battalion commander in order to transmit to him valuable information relative to enemy positions and the disposition of our men.

== Military Awards ==
O'Neill's military decorations and awards include:

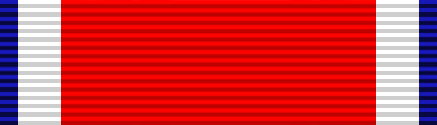

1st row	Medal of Honor	Purple Heart w/ one bronze oak leaf cluster	Mexican Border Service Medal
2nd row	World War I Victory Medal w/one silver service star to denote credit for the Champagne-Marne, Aisne-Marne, St. Mihiel, Meuse-Argonne and Defensive Sector campaign clasps.	Médaille militaire (French Republic)	Croix de guerre 1914–1918 w/bronze palm and unknown number of stars (French Republic)
3rd row	Croce al Merito di Guerra (Italy)	Medal for Military Bravery (Kingdom of Montenegro)	Ordem Militar de Avis degree of Knight (Portuguese Republic)
4th row	Ordinul Steaua României with swords with the ribbon of the Military Virtue Medal (to denote bravery in action) degree of Knight (Romania)	Order of the White Eagle with swords degree of Knight (Kingdom of Serbia)	Conspicuous Service Cross (State of New York)

== See also ==
- List of Medal of Honor recipients
- List of Medal of Honor recipients for World War I

== Sources ==
=== Books ===
- Willbanks, Jim (2011). America's Heroes: Medal of Honor Recipients from the Civil War to Afghanistan. Santa Barbara, CA: ABC-CLIO. ISBN 978-1-59884-393-4.

=== Internet ===
- McNamara, Pat (May 27, 2011). "Sergeant Richard W. O'Neill and the First World War". McNamara's Blog. Patheos.com.
- New York National Guard. "New York Military Service Cards, 1816-1979: World War I and inter-war Era Officers; Nurzey - Smock". Ancestry.com. Provo, UT: Ancestry.com, LLC.

=== Newspapers ===
- "N. Y. Man Who Attacked 25 Germans Gets Honor Medal". New-York Tribune. New York [N.Y.] 6 July 1921. p. 5 – via Chronicling America: Historic American Newspapers. Library of Congress.
- "Police Protect Speaker". Brooklyn Daily Eagle. Brooklyn, NY. October 26, 1928 – via Newspapers.com.
- "Richard W. O'Neill Republican Speaker". Middletown Times Herald. Middletown, NY. February 6, 1941 – via Newspapers.com.
- "Medal of Honor Heroes Avoid Talk About War". Hartford Courant. Hartford, CT. International News Service. November 11, 1956. p. 6A – via Newspapers.com.
- "Medal of Honor Winners on Parade". Arizona Daily Star. Tucson, AZ. Associated Press. October 31, 1965. p. 1 – via Newspapers.com.
- "Memorial Day Parade in Bronxville Tuesday". bronxville Review Press-Reporter. Bronxville, NY. May 25, 1967. p. 1 – via HRVH Historical Newspapers.
- "Congressional Medal Winner, O'Neill, Dies". Bronxville Review Press-Reporter. Bronxville, NY. April 15, 1982 – via HRVH Historical Newspapers.
- Stites, Sam (July 13, 2017). "Telling Their Stories: Legend of Sgt. O'Neill". Lake Oswego Review. Lake Oswego, OR. Archived from the original on July 21, 2017.
