= The Education of Charlie Banks =

- Promotional film poster
- Directed by: Fred Durst
- Written by: Peter Elkoff
- Produced by: Marisa Polvino; Peter Elkoff
- Starring: Jesse Eisenberg; Jason Ritter; Eva Amurri; Gloria Votsis; Chris Marquette
- Cinematography: Alex Nepomniaschy
- Edited by: Eric L. Beason
- Music by: John Swihart
- Distributed by: Anchor Bay Entertainment
- Release dates: April 27, 2007 (Tribeca); March 27, 2009
- Running time: 100 minutes
- Country: United States
- Language: English
- Budget: $5 million
- Box office: $15,078

The Education of Charlie Banks is a 2007 American drama film directed by Fred Durst and starring Jesse Eisenberg, Jason Ritter, Eva Amurri, Gloria Votsis, and Chris Marquette. Produced by Marisa Polvino, the film had its world premiere at the 2007 Tribeca Film Festival, where it won the Made in NY Narrative Award. It is Durst's film directing debut. Peter Care was initially attached to direct. The Education of Charlie Banks received mixed reviews from critics who praised Ritter's performance but criticized Peter Elkoff's screenplay and Durst's direction.

== Plot ==
As a kid, Charlie Banks both admired and feared the charismatic and violent local Mick Leary; in high school, Charlie witnesses Mick beat two jocks nearly to death at a party. Despite Mick being the buddy of his best friend, Danny, Charlie reports Mick to the police.

Three years later, Charlie and Danny are college freshmen. Mick, to their surprise, shows up for a visit. Though claiming to be visiting for the weekend, Mick moves into the two friends' dorm and begins borrowing their clothing, attending their classes, reading their books, and flirting with Mary, a woman on whom Charlie has a crush. Charlie begins to wonder if Mick has changed or if he is plotting fiendish revenge against him.

== Cast ==
- Jesse Eisenberg as Charlie Banks
- Jason Ritter as Mick Leary
- Eva Amurri as Mary
- Gloria Votsis as Nia
- Chris Marquette as Danny Bowman
- Sebastian Stan as Leo Reilly
- Dennis Boutsikaris as Mr. Banks
- Charles Parnell as Assistant District Attorney Worsheck
- Josh Richman as Professor Gersten
- Steven Hinkle as Young Charlie Banks
- Miles Chandler as Young Mick Leary
- Cain Kerner as Young Danny
- Sam Daly as Owen

== Release ==
The film premiered at the 2007 Tribeca Film Festival, where it won Best New York Narrative. It received a limited release in North America on March 27, 2009, before being released on DVD three months later on June 30, 2009.

== Reception ==
The Education of Charlie Banks garnered mixed reviews from critics. On the review aggregator website Rotten Tomatoes, 48% of 31 critics' reviews are positive, with an average rating of 5.2/10. The website's consensus reads: "Unevenness and earnestness mire this otherwise sweet, surprising coming of age drama." Metacritic, which uses a weighted average, assigned the film a score of 50 out of 100, based on 9 critics, indicating "mixed or average" reviews.

Robert Abele of the Los Angeles Times wrote that: "Durst's direction is overly earnest, heavy in long takes, atmosphere wise but scene foolish." Joe Neumaier of the New York Daily News praised Eisenberg for giving a "nicely understated performance" as an "endearing everyman" but felt that Ritter lacked the "necessary air of danger" the script calls for in his role. Norman Wilner of NOW felt that Durst delivered "an overwhelmingly safe movie", criticizing Elkoff's script for having "simple dramatic constructions" and "measured steps" in its plot, and Eisenberg for giving a "blandly conceived version" of the characters he usually portrays, concluding that: "He does the required stammering and shrugging, but it's a tossed-off turn in a movie that’s similarly on autopilot."

Jeannette Catsoulis of The New York Times praised the film for Durst's detail-oriented direction in capturing the early '80s, and the "sincere performances (most notably from Mr. Ritter and Eva Amurri as Charlie's upper-crust crush) and clever writing" for keeping it from being "maudlin" and for serving as "a prickly examination of the sturdiness of class boundaries and the illusion of inclusion." Greg Quill of the Toronto Star pointed out that Elkoff's script carried elements of F. Scott Fitzgerald and his novel The Great Gatsby and had predictable revelations, but gave praise to the "sensitively and intelligently" written characters and Durst for being a storyteller with "great care and assurance" and an attention to detail regarding the film's time period without being showy about it, calling it "an earnest, if romanticized, examination of the American class system in the late 1970s and early 1980s, and the eternally confounding politics of acceptance and exclusion."

Despite skeptically regarding Durst's attempt to evoke viewer sympathy for the rebel Mick, Entertainment Weekly's Owen Gleiberman applauded Ritter's "theatrical chops," comparing him to a "young Ethan Hawke on a bender of violence," and called him "an actor to watch." Michael Rechtshaffen of The Hollywood Reporter criticized Elkoff's writing for being "overtly literate" and Durst's direction for "underscoring the obvious," but commended the latter for his ability to "establish the specifics of place and time" with the film's setting, and craft an "impressively acted ensemble" with his young performers, highlighting Ritter's portrayal of Mick as having "a believably brooding intensity with a bad boy swagger," drawing parallels to the widely acclaimed performances of a young Matt Dillon.
