= A Brother's Kiss =

- Spanish-language theatrical release poster
- Directed by: Seth Zvi Rosenfeld
- Screenplay by: Seth Zvi Rosenfeld
- Based on: A Brother's Kiss by Seth Zvi Rosenfeld
- Produced by: Bob Potter; E. Bennett Walsh
- Starring: Nick Chinlund; Michael Raynor
- Cinematography: Fortunato Procopio
- Edited by: Donna Stern
- Music by: Frank London
- Distributed by: First Look Studios
- Release date: April 25, 1997
- Running time: 92 minutes
- Country: United States
- Language: English

A Brother's Kiss is a 1997 American independent drama film written and directed by Seth Zvi Rosenfeld and starring Nick Chinlund and Michael Raynor. It is based on the 1988 play by Rosenfeld and also his directorial debut. Rosenfeld grew up in the same neighborhood as actor Michael Raynor; Raynor and actor Nick Chinlund were friends as children.

== Plot ==
Mick (Michael Raynor) and Lex (Nick Chinlund) are a pair of brothers who grew up in Harlem under circumstances that were difficult at best. Their mother Doreen (Cathy Moriarty) was a diabetic with a drinking problem and difficulty in saying no to men. While she wasn't a sex worker, she grew dependent on the little gifts her lovers would bring by, and as kids, Mick and Lex learned to accept this as the way things were. One night, Mick and Lex were taking a walk in the park when they were accosted by a cop who molested the younger Mick. Lex, older and strong as a grown man, attacked the cop, which led to a stay in a reform school. Years later, Mick is himself a policeman; while he's tried to bury the childhood incident in his past, he still shows emotional scars and is sexually dysfunctional. Lex has taken the more dramatic slide, getting in and out of trouble since reform school and maintaining a going-nowhere job driving a bus. He has a combative relationship with Debbie (Rosie Perez), girlfriend and the mother of his child, while also selling drugs for local dealer Lefty Louie (John Leguizamo). His own habit has developed so far that his sales don't compensate for the amount he uses himself. Mick tries to look out for his big brother, but it might be too late to save him.

== Cast ==
- Nick Chinlund as Lex
- Michael Raynor as Mick
- Justin Pierce as Young Lex
- Joshua Danowsky as Young Mick
- John Leguizamo as Lefty
- Cathy Moriarty as Doreen
- Rosie Perez as Debbie
- Michael Rapaport as Stingy
- Marisa Tomei as Missy
- Talent Harris as Vic

== Reception ==
On the review aggregator website Rotten Tomatoes, 100% of 5 critics' reviews are positive. Roger Ebert gave the film three stars. John Petrakis of the Chicago Tribune also gave it three stars. Owen Gleiberman of Entertainment Weekly graded it a B−.
