= The Waiting Game (film) =

- Poster
- Directed by: Ken Liotti
- Written by: Ken Liotti; Kirk LaVine
- Produced by: Ken Liotti
- Starring: Will Arnett
- Cinematography: Richard Eliano
- Music by: Jim Farmer
- Production company: Absolute Films Inc.
- Distributed by: Amsell Entertainment; Seventh Art Releasing
- Release date: March 1999
- Running time: 85 minutes
- Country: United States
- Language: English
- Budget: $8,547
- Box office: $19,381

The Waiting Game is a 1999 American comedy film directed, produced and written by Ken Liotti. It stars Will Arnett.

== Premise ==
A group of aspiring young actors wait tables at the New York restaurant.

== Cast ==
- Will Arnett as Lenny
