= Seth Zvi Rosenfeld =

American dramatist

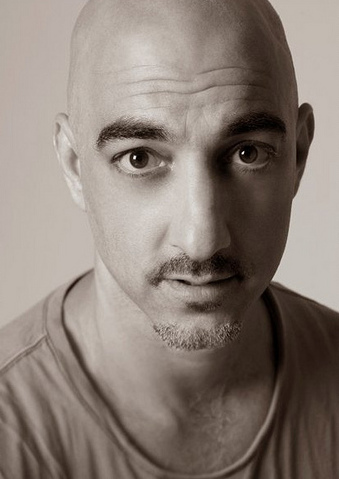
- Born: November 16, 1961 (age 64); New York City, U.S.
- Occupations: Playwright, screenwriter, filmmaker
- Years active: 1985–present
- Spouses: Rosie Perez (m. 1998; div. 2001) Kerri-Ann McCalla-Rosenfeld (m. 2010; died 2018)

Seth Zvi Rosenfeld (born November 16, 1961) is an American playwright, screenwriter and filmmaker.

== Personal life ==
Rosenfeld was born in New York City and was raised in the Bronx and Manhattan. His early interests included graffiti, poetry, and basketball, all of which figure prominently in his work. He was in a relationship for a decade with actress and activist Rosie Perez from 1991 through their marriage in 1998 and divorce in 2001. He was then married to Kerri-Ann McCalla, a Jamaican-born screenwriter and film producer from 2010 until her death from natural causes in 2018.

== Career ==
=== Theatre ===
Rosenfeld began his career as a playwright with the Ensemble Studio Theatre and the now defunct Double Image and Angel Theatre companies. His first project was the play entitled The Writing on the Wall, produced by the Westbeth Theatre Center and for which New Line Cinema purchased the rights. Other plays include The Blackeyed Brothers, which won the Samuel French short play award and was produced by Double Image Theatre; A Brother's Kiss and After the Marching Stopped, produced by Angel Theatre at Intar and retitled Brothers Mothers and Others; Servy-n-Bernice 4ever, directed by Terry Kinney and produced commercially Off-Broadway at the Provincetown Playhouse; A Passover Story, commissioned by the late Joseph Papp for The Public Theater; The Flatted Fifth, Everything is Turning Into Beautiful, and Downtown Race Riot, produced by The New Group. Other works include the tiny plays La Familia, My Starship, and PS: I'm glad you sent your hair for Naked Angels.

=== Film ===
Rosenfeld wrote the feature film, Sunset Park, for Jersey Films/TriStar. His directorial debut, A Brother's Kiss, was based on an Off-Broadway play he wrote about love and loyalty between siblings in East Harlem. Reviews praised the performances and attributed Rosenfeld's upbringing as creating "a realistic sense of street life with hardly a false note." Rosenfeld wrote and directed the films, A Brother's Kiss and King of the Jungle starring John Leguizamo, Marisa Tomei and Rosie Perez, and his award-winning short,Under the Bridge, which ran for several years on BRAVO.

=== Television ===
Rosenfeld directed ten episodes of a web series called We Deliver, partnered with Geebee Dajani, which followed the travails of a marijuana delivery service.
