= Michael Corrente =

American film director and producer

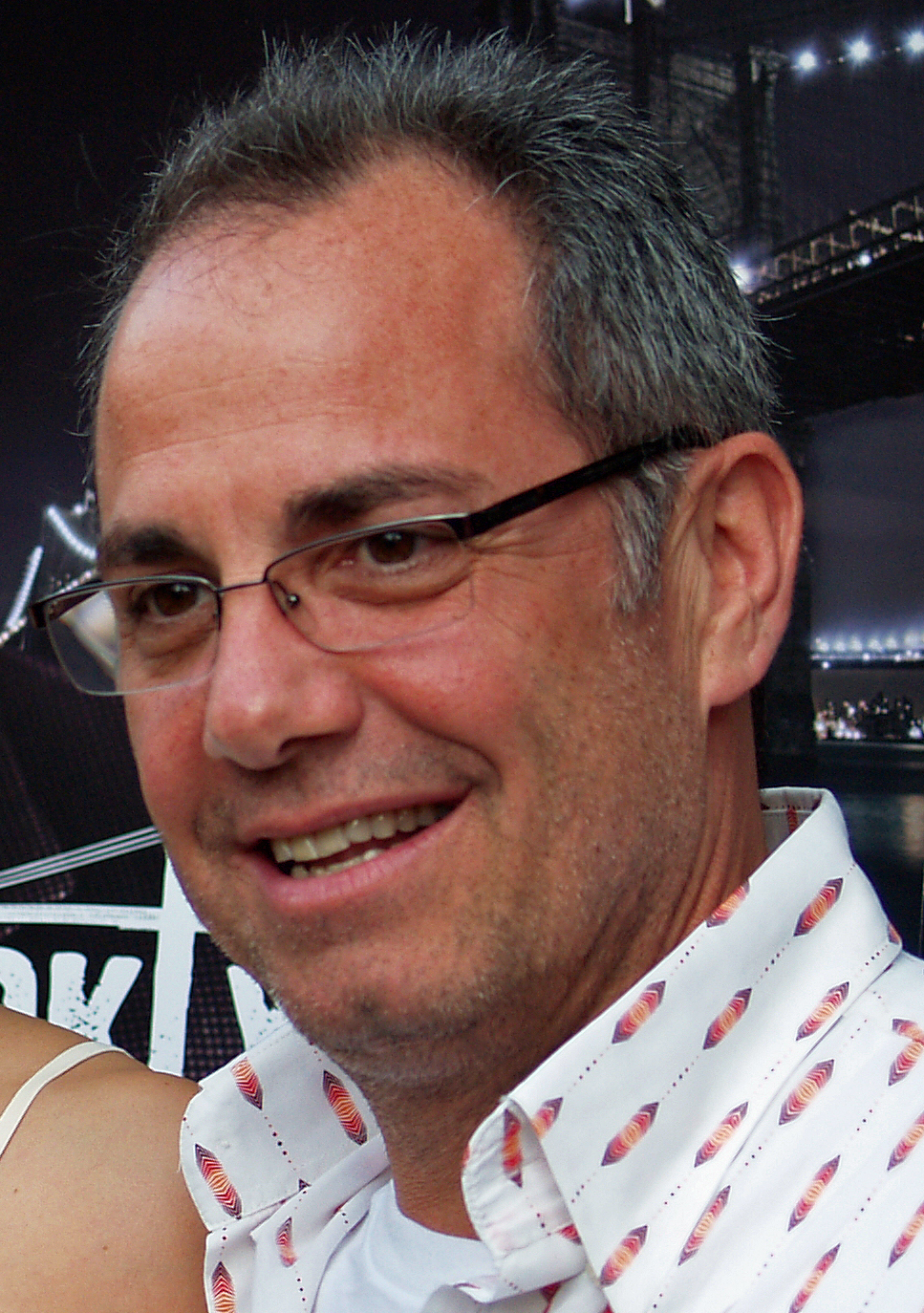
- Corrente in New York City, 2007
- Born: April 6, 1959 (age 67); Pawtucket, Rhode Island

Michael Corrente (born April 6, 1959) is an American film director and producer.

== Career ==
Corrente's films include A Shot at Glory, American Buffalo, Outside Providence, Brooklyn Rules and Federal Hill.

Federal Hill won the Audience Award in 1994 at France's Deauville Film Festival before being picked up for release by Trimark Pictures.

== Personal life ==
Corrente Is the Uncle of Killswitch Engage vocalist Jesse Leach.

== Filmography ==
=== Film ===
Year	Title	Director	Producer	Writer
1989	Title Shot	No	No	Yes
1994	Federal Hill	Yes	Yes	Yes
1995	Tilt-A-Whirl	No	Yes	No
1996	American Buffalo	Yes	No	No
1999	Say You'll Be Mine	No	Yes	No
1999	Outside Providence	Yes	Yes	Yes
2000	A Shot at Glory	Yes	Yes	No
2003	I'll Sleep When I'm Dead	No	Yes	No
2003	When Zachary Beaver Came to Town	No	Yes	No
2004	The Door in the Floor	No	Yes	No
2004	Corn	No	Yes	No
2007	Brooklyn Rules	Yes	Yes	No
2012	Loosies	Yes	No	No
2013	Some Velvet Morning	No	Yes	No
TBA	The Tributaries	No	Yes	No

Acting roles

Year	Title	Role
1989	Title Shot	Bombazzo
1994	Federal Hill	Fredo
1996	Kingpin	Scranton Wino
2001	Shallow Hal	Homeless Man #2
2002	Assassination Tango	Cop at Newsstand

Production assistant

- Spree (1993)
- The First to Go (1997)

Executive producer

- Last Kind Words (2012)

=== Television ===
Year	Title	Episode
2007	Brotherhood	"Shelter from the Storm"

== Awards and nominations ==
Year	Award	Work	Category	Result	Reference
1994	Avignon Film Festival	Federal Hill	Prix Tournage	Won	
1994	Deauville Film Festival	Federal Hill	Coup de Coeur LTC	Won	
1994	Deauville Film Festival	Federal Hill (tied with Little Odessa)	Critics Award	Won	
