= Richie Pérez =

Hispanic American teacher and activist (1944–2004)

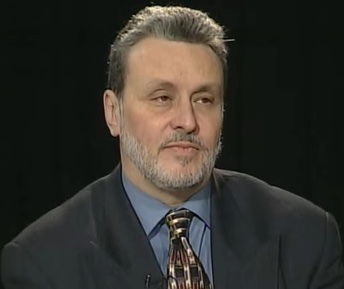
Pérez on CUNY TV's Urban Agenda, 1998

Richard Pérez, widely known as Richie Pérez (1944 – March 27, 2004) was an Hispanic American teacher and activist.

== Life ==
In 1969, Pérez joined the Young Lords, a Puerto Rican rights group which employed radical nonviolent direct action such as providing medical services in underserved communities, establishing day care centers, and advocating for healthcare improvements. Perez organized demonstrations calling for prosecutions in police brutality cases, including the case of Anthony Baez, a Bronx man who died after being put in a choke hold by a city police officer in 1994. Perez helped found People's Justice 2000, a coalition of groups that demonstrated for the prosecution of officers after the precinct assault on Abner Louima and the shooting death of Amadou Diallo.

Pérez was an outspoken critic of racial profiling by the New York City Police Department and was a lead plaintiff in a 1999 lawsuit against the city aimed at abolishing stop-and-frisk searches by the department's Street Crime Unit.

From the 1980s until his death, he was director of community development at the Community Service Society, a nonprofit group serving the poor. He campaigned against racially motivated violence and pushed for voter registration.

His papers are held in the Archives of the Puerto Rican Diaspora at Hunter College, CUNY.

Pérez died of prostate cancer at Memorial Sloan-Kettering Cancer Center on March 27, 2004.
