= List of Silent Hill media =

Silent Hill is a survival horror video game franchise created by Team Silent and published by Konami and Konami Digital Entertainment. As well as the main video game series, numerous types of accompanying merchandise have been released.

== Video games ==
=== Main series ===
Game	Details
Silent Hill Original release date(s): NA: February 24, 1999; JP: March 4, 1999; EU: July 16, 1999	Release years by system: 1999 – PlayStation
Silent Hill 2 Original release date(s): NA: September 24, 2001; JP: September 27, 2001; EU: November 23, 2001	Release years by system: 2001 – PlayStation 2 and Xbox; 2002 – Microsoft Windows
Silent Hill 3 Original release date(s): PAL: May 23, 2003; JP: July 3, 2003; NA: August 6, 2003	Release years by system: 2003 – PlayStation 2, Microsoft Windows
Silent Hill 4: The Room Original release date(s): JP: June 17, 2004; NA: September 7, 2004; EU: September 17, 2004	Release years by system: 2004 – PlayStation 2, Xbox, Microsoft Windows
Silent Hill: Origins Original release date(s): NA: November 6, 2007; EU: November 16, 2007; AU: November 30, 2007; JP: December 6, 2007	Release years by system: 2007 – PlayStation Portable; 2008 – PlayStation 2
Silent Hill: Homecoming Original release date(s): NA: September 30, 2008; NA: November 6, 2008 (PC); EU: February 27, 2009; AU: March 19, 2009	Release years by system: 2008 – PlayStation 3, Xbox 360, Microsoft Windows
Silent Hill: Shattered Memories Original release date(s): NA: December 8, 2009 (Wii); NA: January 19, 2010 (PS2); EU: February 26, 2010; JP: March 25, 2010; AU: May 6, 2010	Release years by system: 2009 – Wii; 2010 – PlayStation 2 and PSP
Silent Hill: Downpour Original release date(s): NA: March 13, 2012; EU: March 30, 2012; AU: April 5, 2012; JP: November 8, 2012 (PS3)	Release years by system: 2012 – PlayStation 3, Xbox 360

=== Remakes ===
Game	Details
Silent Hill 2 (remake) Original release date(s): WW: October 8, 2024; WW: November 21, 2025 (XSXS)	Release years by system: 2024 – PlayStation 5, Windows; 2025 – Xbox Series X/S
Silent Hill 2 (remake) Original release date(s): WW: October 8, 2024; WW: November 21, 2025 (XSXS)	Notes: Remake of Silent Hill 2 from 2001
Silent Hill (remake) Original release date(s): TBA	Release years by system: TBA
Silent Hill (remake) Original release date(s): TBA	Notes: Remake of Silent Hill from 1999

=== Adaptations ===
Game	Details
Play Novel: Silent Hill Original release date(s): JP: March 21, 2001	Release years by system: 2001 – Game Boy Advance
Play Novel: Silent Hill Original release date(s): JP: March 21, 2001	Notes: A visual novel version of first game, it also includes full motion video.
Silent Hill Original release date(s): JP: July 5, 2006; JP: January 17, 2007; TW: 2007; CN: 2008	Release years by system: 2006 – FOMA; 2007 – Java ME
Silent Hill Original release date(s): JP: July 5, 2006; JP: January 17, 2007; TW: 2007; CN: 2008	Notes: Mobile phone game; Also known as Silent Hill DX; Not to be confused with Silent Hill: Orphan, which is called Silent Hill: Mobile in Europe

=== Compilations ===
Game	Details
The Silent Hill Collection Original release date(s): EU: April 21, 2006; JP: July 7, 2006	Release years by system: 2006 – PlayStation 2
The Silent Hill Collection Original release date(s): EU: April 21, 2006; JP: July 7, 2006	Notes: European release contains Silent Hill 2, Silent Hill 3, and Silent Hill 4: The Room. Japanese release also includes the first Silent Hill.; Known in Japan as Silent Hill Complete Set
Silent Hill HD Collection Original release date(s): NA: March 20, 2012; JP: March 29, 2012; EU: March 30, 2012; AU: April 5, 2012	Release years by system: 2012 – PlayStation 3 and Xbox 360
Silent Hill HD Collection Original release date(s): NA: March 20, 2012; JP: March 29, 2012; EU: March 30, 2012; AU: April 5, 2012	Notes: HD compilation of Silent Hill 2 and Silent Hill 3; Only released for PlayStation 3 in Japan

=== Spin-offs ===
Game	Details
Silent Hill: The Arcade Original release date(s): JP: July 25, 2007; EU: 2008; SEA: 2008	Release years by system: 2007 – Arcade
Silent Hill: The Arcade Original release date(s): JP: July 25, 2007; EU: 2008; SEA: 2008	Notes: Arcade cabinet rail shooter similar in gameplay to the House of the Dead series
Silent Hill: Orphan Original release date(s): EU: November 2007; JP: December 2007; NA: October 2008	Release years by system: 2007 – Java ME
Silent Hill: Orphan Original release date(s): EU: November 2007; JP: December 2007; NA: October 2008	Notes: Known as Silent Hill: Mobile in Europe
Silent Hill: The Escape Original release date(s): JP: December 19, 2007; JP: December 17, 2008; NA: December 23, 2008; WW: January 22, 2009; KR: 2010	Release years by system: 2007 – FOMA; 2008 – iOS; 2010 – Android
Silent Hill: The Escape Original release date(s): JP: December 19, 2007; JP: December 17, 2008; NA: December 23, 2008; WW: January 22, 2009; KR: 2010	Notes: Mobile phone game
Silent Hill: Orphan 2 Original release date(s): September 2008	Release years by system: 2008 – Java ME
Silent Hill: Orphan 2 Original release date(s): September 2008	Notes: Known as Silent Hill: Mobile 2 in Europe
Silent Hill: Orphan 3 Original release date(s): March 5, 2010	Release years by system: 2010 – Java ME
Silent Hill: Orphan 3 Original release date(s): March 5, 2010	Notes: Sequel to Silent Hill: Orphan and Silent Hill: Orphan 2
Silent Hill: Book of Memories Original release date(s): NA: October 16, 2012; EU: November 2, 2012; JP: February 14, 2013	Release years by system: 2012 – PlayStation Vita
P.T. Original release date(s): WW: August 12, 2014	Release years by system: 2014 – PlayStation 4
P.T. Original release date(s): WW: August 12, 2014	Notes: An interactive teaser for Silent Hills; Removed from PlayStation Store on 29 April 2015; Ability to redownload was removed in May 2015
Silent Hill: The Short Message Original release date(s): WW: January 31, 2024	Release years by system: 2024 – PlayStation 5
Silent Hill: The Short Message Original release date(s): WW: January 31, 2024	Notes: Free short-form title co-developed by Konami and HexaDrive.
Silent Hill ƒ Original release date(s): WW: September 25, 2025	Release years by system: 2025 – PlayStation 5, Windows, Xbox Series X/S
Silent Hill: Townfall Original release date(s): WW: September 24, 2026	Release years by system: 2026 – PlayStation 5, Windows
Silent Hill: Townfall Original release date(s): WW: September 24, 2026	Notes: The first Silent Hill game co-published by Konami and Annapurna and the first game of the Silent Hill Anthology.

=== Crossovers ===
Game	Details
New International Track & Field Original release date(s): EU: June 20, 2008; AU: July 4, 2008; NA: July 22, 2008; JP: July 24, 2008	Release years by system: 2008 – Nintendo DS
New International Track & Field Original release date(s): EU: June 20, 2008; AU: July 4, 2008; NA: July 22, 2008; JP: July 24, 2008	Notes: New International Track & Field is a sports video game developed by Sumo Digital and published by Konami. It features Pyramid Head from the Silent Hill series.
The★BishiBashi Original release date(s): JP: July 29, 2009	Release years by system: 2009 – Arcade
The★BishiBashi Original release date(s): JP: July 29, 2009	Notes: The★BishiBashi is an arcade video game developed and published by Konami. It features Robbie the Rabbit from the Silent Hill series.
Krazy Kart Racing Original release date(s): NA: August 31, 2009; NA: August 17, 2011	Release years by system: 2009 – iOS; 2011 – Android
Krazy Kart Racing Original release date(s): NA: August 31, 2009; NA: August 17, 2011	Notes: Krazy Kart Racing is a Konami mascot kart racer video game developed by Polarbit and published by Konami. It features Pyramid Head and Robbie the Rabbit from the Silent Hill series.
Super Bomberman R Original release date(s): WW: March 3, 2017; WW: June 12, 2018	Release years by system: 2017 – Nintendo Switch; 2018 – PlayStation 4, Windows, Xbox One
Super Bomberman R Original release date(s): WW: March 3, 2017; WW: June 12, 2018	Notes: The characters Pyramid Head Bomber and Bubble Head Bomber are downloadable content for the game.
Dead by Daylight: Silent Hill Original release date(s): WW: June 16, 2020	Release years by system: 2020 – Microsoft Windows, PlayStation 4, Xbox One, Nintendo Switch, Android, iOS
Dead by Daylight: Silent Hill Original release date(s): WW: June 16, 2020	Notes: Downloadable content for Dead by Daylight, a multiplayer survival horror video game.
Super Bomberman R Online Original release date(s): WW: September 1, 2020; WW: May 27, 2021	Release years by system: 2020 – Google Stadia; 2021 – Nintendo Switch, PlayStation 4, Windows, Xbox One, Xbox Series X/S
Super Bomberman R Online Original release date(s): WW: September 1, 2020; WW: May 27, 2021	Notes: The characters Pyramid Head Bomber, Robbie the Rabbit Bomber, and Bubble Head Bomber are downloadable content for the game.
Monsters & Mortals - Silent Hill Original release date(s): WW: March 23, 2021	Release years by system: 2021 – Microsoft Windows
Monsters & Mortals - Silent Hill Original release date(s): WW: March 23, 2021	Notes: Downloadable content for Dark Deception: Monsters & Mortals, a multiplayer survival horror video game spin-off from the Dark Deception franchise.
Super Bomberman R 2 Original release date(s): WW: September 13, 2023	Release years by system: 2023 – Nintendo Switch, PlayStation 4, PlayStation 5, Windows, Xbox One, Xbox Series X/S
Super Bomberman R 2 Original release date(s): WW: September 13, 2023	Notes: The characters Pyramid Head Bomber, Robbie the Rabbit Bomber, and Bubble Head Bomber are downloadable content for the game.
Jikkyou Pawafuru Puroyakyu Original release date(s): JP: January 22, 2024	Release years by system: 2024 – iOS, Android
Jikkyou Pawafuru Puroyakyu Original release date(s): JP: January 22, 2024	Notes: Jikkyou Pawafuru Puroyakyu is a baseball game developed by Diamond Head and published by Konami. Pyramid Head was added as a playable Power Pro along with other Konami characters on January 22, 2024.
State of Survival x Silent Hill Original release date(s): WW: October 29, 2025	Release years by system: 2025 – iOS, Android, Microsoft Windows
State of Survival x Silent Hill Original release date(s): WW: October 29, 2025	Notes: State of Survival x Silent Hill is a 2025 live event in State of Survival, a strategy role-playing video game developed by FunPlus. It is a crossover with the Silent Hill series in which Heather Mason is caught in an alternate world and forced to fend off malicious creatures, including zombies, Bubble Head Nurses, and Red Pyramid Thing.

=== Pachislots ===
Game	Details
Silent Hill (pachislot) Original release date(s): JP: October 5, 2015	Release years by system: 2015 – Pachislot
Silent Hill (pachislot) Original release date(s): JP: October 5, 2015	Notes: A Silent Hill 2 themed slot machine game
Silent Hill: Return Original release date(s): US: 2019	Release years by system: 2019 – Pachislot
Silent Hill: Return Original release date(s): US: 2019	Notes: A Silent Hill 3 themed slot machine game
Silent Hill: Escape Original release date(s): US: 2019	Release years by system: 2019 – Pachislot
Silent Hill: Escape Original release date(s): US: 2019	Notes: A Silent Hill: Downpour themed slot machine game

== Films ==
Game	Details
Silent Hill (film) April 21, 2006 – film	Notes: Directed by Christophe Gans and released through TriStar Pictures in the United States, and Pathé in Europe.; It opened at number one in the U.S. with $20.1 million dollars, on its way to a total of $47 million domestically.
Silent Hill: Revelation October 26, 2012 – film	Notes: Sequel to the 2006 film.
Return to Silent Hill January 23, 2026 – film	Notes: Directed by Christophe Gans; Based on Silent Hill 2

== Television ==
Game	Details
Silent Hill: Ascension Original release date(s): WW: October 31, 2023	Release years by system: 2023 – Web browser, Android, iOS

== Other media ==
Game	Details
Book of Lost Memories 2003 – guidebook	Notes: Details various aspects of the first three games such as symbolism and ideas behind games or development process
Drawing Block: Silent Hill 3 Program 2003 – artbook	Notes: Added to limited editions of Silent Hill 3 together with Lost Memories DVD and two posters
Lost Memories: The Art and Music of Silent Hill July 3, 2003 – DVD	Notes: Divided into seven sections, it contains full soundtracks, trailer collections, artworks, renders and creature galleries from the first three games and additional music videos.
Silent Hill (comics) February 2004 – December 2014 – comic books	Notes: Written by Scott Ciencin (Dying Inside, Among The Damned, Paint It Black, The Grinning Man, Dead/Alive, Hunger) and Tom Waltz (Sinner's Reward, Past Life, Anne's Story) with artwork by Ben Templesmith (Dying Inside #1 and 2), Aadi Salman (Dying Inside #3, 4, 5), Shaun Thomas (Among The Damned, Paint It Black), Nick Stakal (The Grinning Man, Dead/Alive), Steve Perkins (Hunger pp.1-25), Alex Shibao (Hunger pp.26-50), Steph Stamb (Sinner's Reward), Menton J. Matthews III (Past Life) and Tristan Jones (Anne's Story) and published by IDW Publishing. An earlier standalone graphic novel from British publisher Com.X was completed in 1999 but never released.
The Silent Hill Experience April 6, 2006 – PSP	Notes: Designed as a promotional item for the 2006 film, it contained six comics and twenty songs from the first four games.
Silent Hill (novel) June 25, 2006 – light novel	Notes: Novelization of the 2006 film written by Paula Edgewood also only released in Japanese
Silent Hill: The Novel August 11, 2006 – light novel	Notes: Novelization of the first game written by Sadamu Yamashita and illustrated by Masahiro Ito
Silent Hill: Cage of Cradle September 2006 – cellphone manga	Notes: Written by Hiroyuki Owaku and illustrated by Masahiro Ito
Silent Hill 2: The Novel November 22, 2006 – light novel	Notes: Novelization of the second game written by Sadamu Yamashita and illustrated by Masahiro Ito
Silent Hill: Double under Dusk July 6, 2007 – cellphone manga	Notes: Written by Hiroyuki Owaku and illustrated by Masahiro Ito
Silent Hill 3: The Novel July 27, 2007 – light novel	Notes: Novelization of the third game written by Sadamu Yamashita and illustrated by Masahiro Ito
White Hunter January 25, 2008 – mini comic book	Notes: Short 6-page comic written and illustrated by Masahiro Ito, packaged with the Japanese Silent Hill: Origins soundtrack
Silent Hill: Revelation (novel) June 27, 2013 – light novel	Notes: Novelization of the 2012 film; released only in Japanese
Silent Hill: Betrayal 2016 – light novel	Notes: Silent Hill: Betrayal is a 2016 novel written by Shaun M Jooste. Konami distributors and agents allowed Jooste to publish the novel.
Silent Hill f (novel) October 30, 2025 – light novel	Notes: Novelization of the video game of the same name, written by Shiro Kuro and published by Kadokawa Group.
Return to Silent Hill (novel) January 27, 2026 – light novel	Notes: Novelization of the 2026 film written by John Passarella
Silent Hill f (manga) April 22, 2026–present – manga	Notes: Manga adaptation of the video game of the same name, illustrated by Ame Gokin and published by Young Ace UP.
Silent Hill: Townfall – The Dock House September 16, 2026 – comic book	Notes: Written by Jon McKellan with artwork by David Roach and published by 2000 AD.

=== Soundtracks ===
Title	Release date	Length	Label	Ref.
Silent Hill (Original Soundtracks)	March 5, 1999	1:11:48	King Records	
Silent Hill 2 (Original Soundtracks)	October 3, 2001	1:14:15	Konami Music Entertainment	
Silent Hill 3 (Original Soundtrack)	May 23, 2003	1:16:18	Konami Music Entertainment	
Silent Hill 4: The Room (Original Soundtracks)	June 17, 2004	1:12:50	Konami Media Entertainment	
Silent Hill: Zero (Original Soundtracks)	January 25, 2008	1:05:54	Konami Digital Entertainment	
Silent Hill: Homecoming (Soundtrack)	November 24, 2008	1:10:01	Konami Digital Entertainment	
Silent Hill: Shattered Memories (Soundtrack)	December 8, 2009	54:41	Konami Digital Entertainment	
Silent Hill: Sounds Box	March 16, 2011	9:07:13	Konami Digital Entertainment	
Silent Hill: Downpour (Original Soundtrack)	March 13, 2012	58:32	Milan Records	
Silent Hill: Book of Memories (Original Soundtrack)	April 17, 2012	1:02:43	Milan Records	
Silent Hill: Revelation (Original Motion Picture Soundtrack)	October 30, 2012	1:05:24	Lakeshore Records	
Silent Hill (Original Motion Picture Soundtrack)	March 23, 2019	1:06:28	Digital River	
Dead by Daylight: Silent Hill Edition (Special Soundtrack)	November 19, 2020	40:10	3goo	
Silent Hill: Ascension (Original Soundtrack)	January 22, 2024	1:23:40	Konami Digital Entertainment	
Silent Hill: The Short Message (Original Soundtrack)	May 11, 2024	3:16:43	Konami Digital Entertainment	
Silent Hill 2 (Original Soundtrack –2024–)	November 20, 2024	3:22:23	Konami Digital Entertainment	
Silent Hill f (Digital Soundtrack)	September 25, 2025	58:06	Konami Digital Entertainment	
Return to Silent Hill (Original Motion Picture Soundtrack)	January 23, 2026	1:30:00	Laced Records	
Silent Hill: Townfall - Selected Soundtrack	September 24, 2026	1:10:50	Konami Digital Entertainment	
