= Pyramid Head =

Fictional video game character

- Silent Hill character
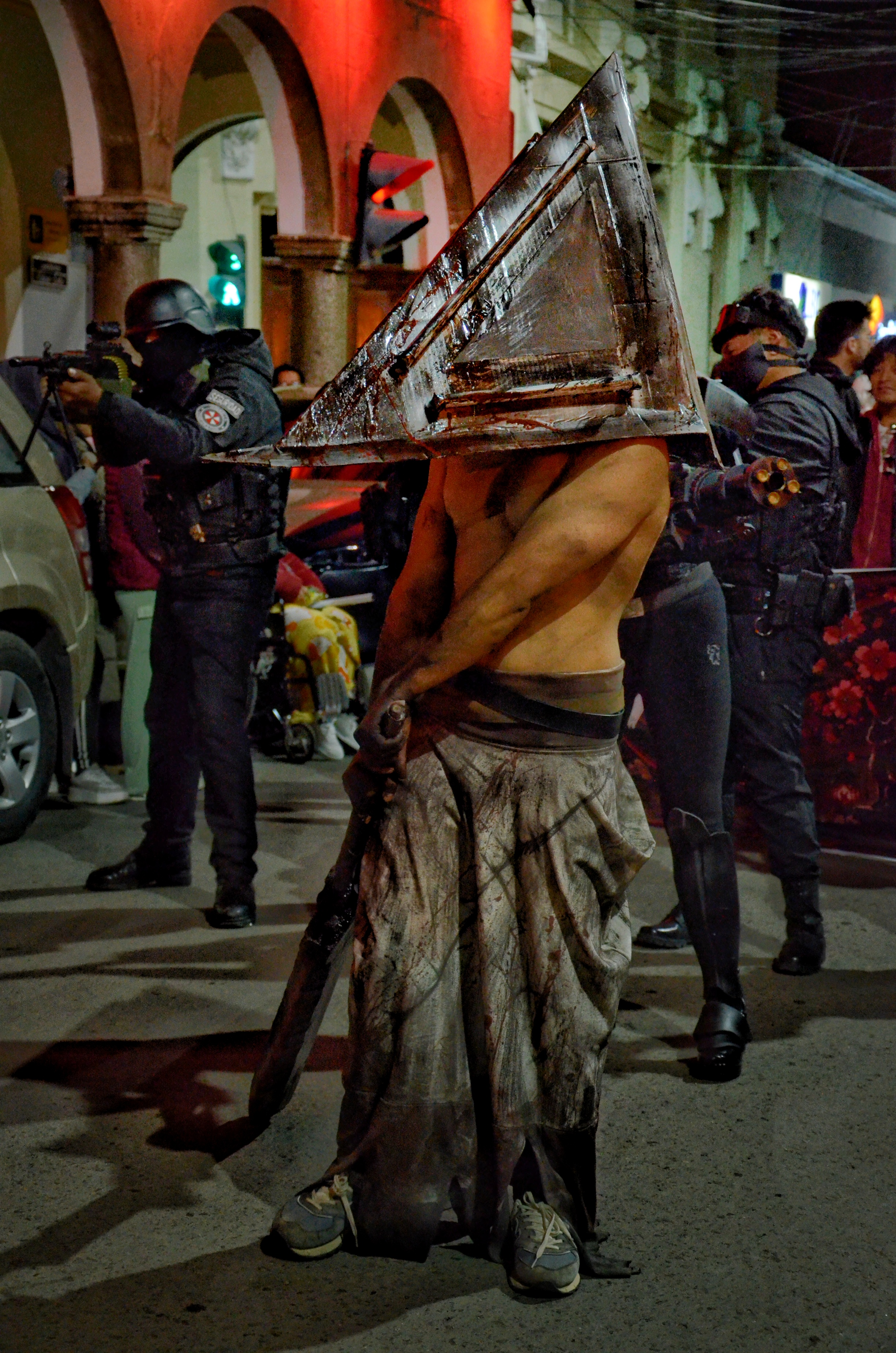
- Pyramid Head as he appears in Silent Hill 2
- First appearance: Silent Hill 2 (2001)
- Designed by: Masahiro Ito
- Portrayed by: Roberto Campanella (2006 film, Revelation); Robert Strange (Return to Silent Hill)

Pyramid Head, also known as "Red Pyramid Thing" (レッドピラミッドシング, Reddo Piramiddo Shingu), "Red Triangle Head" (赤い三角頭, Akai Sankakutō), or "Triangle Head" (三角頭, Sankakuatama), is a character from the Silent Hill series, a survival horror video game series created by Japanese company Konami.

Introduced in the 2001 installment Silent Hill 2, he is a type of monster that serves as the secondary antagonist, stalking James Sunderland, the primary player character, who comes to the town of Silent Hill after receiving a letter from his deceased wife, Mary. The Silent Hill series, particularly the second installment, frequently utilizes psychology and symbolism; Pyramid Head represents James's wish to be punished for Mary's death. Masahiro Ito, the designer of Silent Hill 2's monsters, created the character because he wanted "a monster with a hidden face". Known for his large triangular helmet that conceals his head, Pyramid Head lacks a voice or a visible face, and his appearance stems from the town's past as a place of execution.

He has since appeared in the 2006 film Silent Hill as "Red Pyramid", in the 2007 first-person shooter Silent Hill: The Arcade as a boss, and in the sixth installment of the series, Silent Hill: Homecoming, as the "Boogeyman". He has also made an appearance outside of the Silent Hill series as a playable character in the games New International Track & Field, Super Bomberman R, Power Pros, and Dead by Daylight. Positively received in Silent Hill 2 for his role as an element of James' psyche, he has been cited by reviewers as an iconic villain of the series and part of Silent Hill 2's appeal.

== Concept and design ==
A monster with a concealed face was the concept behind Pyramid Head's design; Ito rejected his initial sketch (left), which resembled a masked human, and gave the creature a pyramid-shaped helmet (right).

Ito wanted to create "a monster with a hidden face", but became unhappy with his designs, which resembled humans wearing masks. He then drew a monster with a pyramid-shaped helmet. According to Ito, the triangle's sharp right and acute angles suggest the possibility of pain. Of the creatures that appear in Silent Hill 2, only Pyramid Head features an "overtly masculine" appearance. He resembles a pale, muscular man covered with a white, blood-soaked robe reminiscent of a butcher's smock. He does not speak, but grunts and moans painfully. His most outstanding feature is his large red, triangular helmet. (Note: While Ito designed the monster to have a pyramid-shaped helmet, one of the potential endings to Silent Hill: Homecoming re-imagines it lined with spikes on the inside that is put on the player character to turn him into a Pyramid Head (or Bogeyman, as the monster is referred to in Homecoming).) His weapons consist of the deadly and heavy Great Knife, which the player can find and use for the rest of the game, and later a spear. As a German World War II tank enthusiast, Ito was inspired by the lower hull of the King Tiger heavy tank when designing the edges of the character's helmet; other military vehicles from that region and era informed design elements as well.

According to Konami's Lost Memories, his appearance was a variation of the outfits of the executioners from the fictional history of the town. They wore red hoods and ceremonial robes to make themselves similar to Valtiel, a monster who appears in Silent Hill 3. Like Valtiel, Pyramid Head dresses in gloves and stitched cloth and pursues the game's main protagonist. According to Silent Hill 2's character designer Takayoshi Sato, he appears as a "distorted memory of the executioners" and of the town's past as a place of execution.

Christophe Gans, the director of the film adaptation of Silent Hill, suggested that Pyramid Head "was one of the executioners in the original history of the town" and "there is not one particular or exclusive manifestation of him as an entity." However, Ito rejected this suggestion, stating "they really misunderstood Pyramid Head. I designed that only for James." In October 2022, it was revealed that Pyramid Head's executioner background was inspired by characters in the 1995 film Braveheart.

== Appearances ==
=== In video games ===
In Silent Hill 2, after receiving a letter from his deceased wife, Mary, and arriving in the foggy town of Silent Hill to search for her, the game's protagonist and primary player character, James Sunderland, encounters Pyramid Head several times over the course of the game. Pyramid Head, under the new moniker "Bogeyman", makes a significant appearance in 2008 installment Silent Hill: Homecoming, but his role is limited to non-interactive scenes, appearing only twice to the game's main protagonist Alex Shepherd (once in the Grand Hotel in Silent Hill and, much later, in a church, where he executes Alex's father by splitting him in half). His last appearance is in a possible ending to the game: Alex wakes up in a wheelchair as two Pyramid Heads appear, each with part of a helmet, which they use to turn Alex into one of them. After this ending is played, the player obtains the Bogeyman's costume for Alex to wear. Mindful of Pyramid Head's role in Silent Hill 2, the developers chose to include him as "the embodiment of a myth [that] parents started to keep the children out of trouble" and "the accretion of the activities going on in the town of Shepherd's Glen."

Pyramid Head appears as a boss in the 2007 first-person shooter Silent Hill: The Arcade, as well as Silent Hill: The Escape, but with a composite design with the Butcher, and as a super-deformed selectable character in the 2008 Nintendo DS title New International Track & Field, an installment of the Track & Field series, another spin-off Krazy Kart Racing alongside Robbie the Rabbit, and in 2017's Super Bomberman R as Pyramid Bomber, alongside Simon Belmont from the Castlevania series, and Gradius's Vic Viper. The 2007 game Silent Hill: Origins also included a similar monster named "The Butcher", whom the protagonist occasionally encounters killing other monsters (unlike other versions of Pyramid Head, the Butcher can and must be fought and killed in combat) and a painting of Pyramid Head is seen in the burning house of Alessa. In the 2012 installment Silent Hill: Downpour, Pyramid Head makes a cameo appearance in the "Surprise!" ending, along with various other characters from the franchise. Pyramid Head's most recent appearance was in 2012's Silent Hill: Book of Memories, where he is a monster that can spawn randomly to fight the player. Pyramid Head also appeared as a costume for the Playstation Home.

Pyramid Head was included as a purchasable killer for the survival horror game Dead by Daylight with the release of the CHAPTER 16:Silent Hill DLC on June 16, 2020. His title is "The Executioner", a nod to his past as the executioner of Silent Hill. Pyramid Head was a boss character in the Silent Hill DLC of Dark Deception: Monsters & Mortals, In where he's referred to by his original name of Red Pyramid Thing. Pyramid Head also makes a cameo appearance in the PlayStation 5 game Astro's Playroom.

=== In other media ===
"The big change in Red Pyramid for me was not his head as much as his body. In the game, he has a very deformed body, almost a hunchback. Instead we decided to make him [in the film] a tall, powerful character a little like the Warrior God in Stargate that Patrick Tatopoulos created. Why? Because for me there is a little of Anubis [sic], the Egyptian god of death in the Red Pyramid."

— Christophe Gans

Pyramid Head makes an appearance in the 2006 film adaptation of Silent Hill as "Red Pyramid", and is portrayed by Roberto Campanella. In the film, the psyches of the female characters shaped the character's physical appearance. Gans claimed that replicating the character's head exactly and having the actor move while wearing it proved to be impractical; he noted that, despite the name, Pyramid Head actually wore "a basin" instead of a triangle-shaped helmet. Red Pyramid's sword and helmet were constructed out of lightweight material painted to appear heavy. For the role, Campanella wore a "five-part prosthetic"; it took two-and-a-half to three hours to get him into costume and make-up. His boots had a hidden 15-inch (38 cm) sole which made him just under 7 feet (2.1 m) tall. Patrick Tatopoulos, who worked on the make-up effects and monsters, enjoyed the project of designing the character. According to him, Red Pyramid serves as a symbol of the town's darkness and harbinger of its changed character. Gans considered the monsters of the film "a mockery of human beings", and commented: "The real monsters are the people, the cultists who tortured Alessa. When I approached the film, I knew that it was impossible to represent the monsters as simply beasts that jump on you."

In the 2012 film Silent Hill: Revelation, Pyramid Head, once more portrayed by Roberto Campanella, is both a monster and a guardian. More than once, it saves Sharon from the forces of Silent Hill. This is explained by its loyalty to Alessa: since Heather is the good half of Alessa's soul, it sees them as the same being and is thus bound to protect both from harm. Pyramid Head is also seen controlling the carousel where Heather and Alessa face off against each other, then it kills the cult leader Claudia Wolf after the amulet shows her inner, monstrous nature.

Pyramid Head makes brief appeareances in the 2026 film Return to Silent Hill.

He also makes a cameo appearance in the 2008 Silent Hill comic book Sinner's Reward, published by IDW Publishing. The writer, Tom Waltz, later said he regretted the cameo, which only functioned as fan service. To him, Pyramid Head is a psychological construct created for James; however, he stated that: "At the same time, I don't think that ruined the comic. Some people really liked it. To some people, Pyramid Head should be in all the stories because they do like him." Additionally, the character was portrayed from October 2 to 31, 2009, in the haunted attraction Sinister Pointe, based on Silent Hill, in Orange County, California, United States. Merchandise featuring Pyramid Head includes action figurines.

== Analysis ==
The Silent Hill series uses symbolism and psychology; the town of Silent Hill draws upon the psyche of its visitors, ultimately creating an "otherworld," a twisting of reality that manifests delusions and elements of their subconscious minds, varying from character to character. Specifically, in the case of Silent Hill 2's primary player character James Sunderland, the version of the town he explores is influenced by him. Many of the monsters that roam the town symbolize his guilt, wish for punishment, for his wife's three-year-long illness, and cease to exist after James comes to terms with the fact that he killed his wife Mary, partially to end her suffering and partially out of resentment and frustration. James knew she had a terminal illness, which has been speculated to be cancer, and he often read medical textbooks, searching for something to help her. During her last days alive, she became physically repulsive as a result of the illness and treated James abusively, ordering him to leave one moment and begging him to comfort her the next. The knowledge of her terminal illness caused her to become angry and to hurt her loved ones, particularly James, and it pained him to visit her in the hospital. Pyramid Head functions as an executioner of Maria, a delusion of James's who strongly resembles Mary. Through Maria's repeated deaths, Pyramid Head reminds James of Mary's death and causes him to experience guilt and suffering. His appearance as an executioner stems from a picture that James saw while visiting the town three years ago with Mary.

Pyramid Head's Great Knife is actually one half of a pair of scissors. The developer's intent was for James to obtain the other half of the scissors later in the game, symbolizing Pyramid Head's role as a reflection of his psyche. However Ito did not have enough time to put a second Great Knife in the game. James ultimately obtains the same knife wielded by Pyramid Head.

Reviewers have suggested various interpretations. According to Christina González of The Escapist, Pyramid Head acts as "judgement personified, a dark butcher", and "James' masochistic delusion" which punishes him for Mary's death. Ken Gagne of Computerworld suggested that the monster "represents James' anger and guilt." A critic for IGN, Jesse Schedeen, considered Pyramid Head's role throughout the Silent Hill series to be "a manifestation of a person's guilt", commenting: "Pyramid Head is just there to help you serve your penance in the most painful and grotesque way possible."

== Reception ==
Critical reaction to Pyramid Head has been favorable for his distinctive appearance and role as an element of James' psyche. Critics cite him as an iconic villain of the Silent Hill series, a favorite among fans, and part of the appeal of Silent Hill 2. GameSpot compared Pyramid Head's appearance to Leatherface, the main antagonist of The Texas Chainsaw Massacre series of slasher films, and found him the most terrifying monster in Silent Hill 2. Computerworld named Pyramid Head one of the most terrifying villains in video game history. GamesRadar interpreted the scene in which he kills the two other monsters as rape and called it unsettling, since the subject of rape is not often tackled in video games. Another GamesRadar journalist disliked the final battle with Pyramid Head, deeming it anticlimactic in comparison with his role throughout the rest of the game. Red Bull stated Pyramid Head is "the stuff of nightmares in video games, quite literally. Pyramid Head has terrorized game audiences and fans of the Silent Hill franchise for years." Empire described him as one of the greatest video game characters, commenting that "Stalking the claustrophobic corridors of the vacant town, he remains one of the few masculine entities in the series and one of the most shocking monstrosities in gaming history." Den of Geek noted the character's popularity and said that "before we knew exactly what Pyramid Head was, the mere sight of the monster triggered something inside of us that overcome our cynicism and defenses. He intrigued us, he repulsed us, but he made us feel something that so many other monsters can't make us feel. It's easy to get caught up in the cynicism of how marketing and products often turn characters into caricatures. Yet, that process has to start with the creation of something truly incredible. In his original form, Pyramid Head was most certainly that."

Magazines have also called him one of the scariest and best video game villains. GamesRadar has praised Pyramid Head's role as an antagonist and described him as one of the best villains in video game history. In a 2009 retrospective on the survival horror genre, IGN noted that Silent Hill 2 incorporated "a 'stalker' element similar to Clock Tower and Resident Evil 3 and wrote: "To this day, Pyramid Head is remembered as one of gaming's most frightening villains." IGN also described Pyramid Head as one of their favorite video game monsters of all time, stating that "Pyramid Head is no stranger to IGN Stars lately, having shown up in several recent character countdowns. There's just something about Halloween that makes us go all gushy for this horrific monster."

His appearances outside Silent Hill 2 have received mixed critical reaction. Critics generally agreed that Pyramid Head's appearance in Homecoming struck them as fan service, though Chris Hudak of GameRevolution called it "damned effectively-employed." Masahiro Ito commented that Pyramid Head was designed specifically for James' story in Silent Hill 2, and that, if he were to make another Silent Hill game, he would either not use Pyramid Head again or kill him off entirely in the opening scene. Film critics commented on his role in the film adaption, with several finding the character disturbing. DVD Reviews praised Campanella's portrayal of Pyramid Head and another monster, writing: "These are without a doubt some of the most striking bogeymen that I have seen on screen in a long time." His appearance in New International Track & Field received mixed critical reaction. GameDaily disliked it, finding it awkward that a character like Pyramid Head was competing in sporting events with characters like Frogger and Sparkster, while The Escapist called it enjoyable and "hilarious".

== See also ==
- Nemesis, a similar character in the Resident Evil survival horror video game series
