= Silent Hill: Book of Memories =

2012 dungeon crawler video game

- Developer: WayForward Technologies
- Publisher: Konami
- Director: Adam Tierney
- Producers: James Maxwell; Tomm Hulett
- Designers: Kazuya Takahashi; Adam Tierney; James Montagna; James Maxwell; Tomm Hulett
- Programmer: Robert Koshak
- Artist: Damon DuBois
- Writer: Tomm Hulett
- Composer: Daniel Licht
- Series: Silent Hill
- Engine: Infernal Engine
- Platform: PlayStation Vita
- Release: NA: October 16, 2012; EU: November 2, 2012; AU: November 8, 2012; JP: February 14, 2013
- Genre: Dungeon crawler
- Modes: Single-player, multiplayer

Silent Hill: Book of Memories is a 2012 dungeon crawler game developed by WayForward Technologies and published by Konami. Released for the PlayStation Vita, it is a spin-off of the Silent Hill video game series. It features a player-created protagonist who receives the titular book on their birthday, which contains their entire life story, and makes changes to it with unforeseen and often unfavorable consequences. Book of Memories features gameplay elements from role-playing games: as the player character traverses the dungeons and defeats monsters there, they gain experience points and thus improve their respective abilities. The character progresses from each themed level by collecting pieces of a puzzle and then solving the puzzle. Five endings are available based on the character's alignment; the sixth is a joke ending in the tradition of previous Silent Hill games.

Book of Memories entered development in summer 2010. Konami intended for the game's content to be oriented towards short multiplayer sessions on a handheld console, which was a departure from the single-player gameplay of previous Silent Hill titles. The narrative concept of Book of Memories was inspired by the fictional Book of Lost Memories in Silent Hill game lore, with the Book of Memories conceptualized as the literal story of a person's life. Daniel Licht returned to score its soundtrack; Rob King and voice actor Troy Baker contributed a track, which featured vocals by Mary Elizabeth McGlynn and Baker's background vocals. Upon release, Book of Memories received mixed reviews. Critics remarked on its departure from the perceived trappings of the Silent Hill franchise, and were divided on its place within the series: some wrote that it succeeded as an enjoyable dungeon crawler, while others criticized it as neither a faithful Silent Hill title nor a good dungeon crawler.

== Gameplay ==
Book of Memories contains an option for online multiplayer gameplay for up to four players.

The objective of Silent Hill: Book of Memories is to guide the player character from an overhead perspective through a series of monster-filled dungeons. The player can choose from five character classes (bookworm, goth, jock, preppy, and rocker) for their player character, which can be customized to a degree. The player character receives experience points for defeating the various monsters; after enough experience points are obtained, the character levels up, allowing the player to improve the character's statistics ("strength, dexterity, agility, intelligence, mind, and vitality"). Each type of character prefers certain statistics; for example, a jock will have greater strength and dexterity than the other types. Items to improve the character's statistics can be equipped.

The goal of each area (called zones) is to collect the required amount of puzzle pieces to solve that area's puzzle and then proceed to the next zone. Each zone contains a save point and a shop run by a non-player character, where the character may purchase items with memory residue, the in-game currency. At the beginning of each zone, another non-player character, Valtiel, offers the player character an optional side quest. Puzzle pieces can be found in rooms with challenge orbs; breaking the orb results in the appearance of monsters, all of whom must be defeated to obtain the puzzle piece. Various traps can be present in the rooms. Certain rooms called Forsaken Rooms contain a ghost; the player's actions towards it result in a positive, negative, or neutral outcome, which, in turn, affects the ending of the game.

For combat, the player character can find a variety of melee and ranged weapons, ammunition, and items to restore lost "health". Melee weapons take damage and eventually break from being used, although items to repair the damage can be found. In the beginning, the character is limited to a carrying capacity of two weapons. Additionally, the game features an alignment system: Blood, Steel, and Light. Collecting the karma left behind by a defeated enemy shifts the character's alignment towards either the Light or Blood end of the karma meter, depending on the monster. Each alignment features different abilities, and affects the ending of the game. The creatures present in Book of Memories have appeared in previous Silent Hill games, such as Silent Hill 2's Pyramid Head and the ghosts from Silent Hill 4: The Room. It is the first installment in the series to feature multiplayer gameplay, apart from Silent Hill: The Arcade.

== Plot ==
On their birthday, the player-created protagonist receives the mysterious Book of Memories, which outlines their entire life. The protagonist attempts to change their life for the better, with unforeseen and often unfavorable consequences: in their dreams, they visit a monster-filled location that corresponds to the particular character affected by the protagonist's alterations to the book. After a while, the protagonist comes to realize that the respective guardian monster of each location has been representative of the person whose life is affected by changes made to the book; by defeating that guardian, the protagonist was overcoming that person's desires and thus altered their life. The protagonist resolves to find their own guardian before anyone else can and contemplates undoing the changes made to the book.

After finding and killing the protagonist's guardian monster, five endings are made available, based on the in-game notes collected. In the "Pure Blood" ending, the protagonist uses the book to live a life of excess, until they find their spouse writing in the book one day. The protagonist then writes them out of their life and descends into a spiral of distrust and misery until the book goes blank. In the "Blood" ending, the protagonist tries to destroy the book to no avail. The neutral ending finds the protagonist in a psychiatric institution, trying to use the book's power to balance the world. In the "Light" ending, the protagonist's resolve to not write in the book anymore is tested by the barrage of tragedies being broadcast on the television, while the "Pure Light" ending finds the gravely ill protagonist giving up their life to save a child's. The sixth ending is a joke ending in the tradition of the Silent Hill series. It features the characters of Book of Memories traveling to Silent Hill on spring break, encountering characters from previous installments in the series.

== Development ==
The Book of Lost Memories is a big part of Silent Hill lore, so I decided that there must be a Book of Memories itself — which became our tentative title, but stuck and eventually became official. Many of our initial plot ideas sprang from this concept. Eventually, we settled on the one that seemed most compelling: what if it was a literal book of memories; a person's life story. Writing in [the book] may actually change history and therein the present. How would that affect a life? A reality?

— Video game producer Tomm Hulett

Development of Silent Hill: Book of Memories began in summer 2010; major guidelines were "'Vita-centric Silent Hill', 'Not traditional', and 'Different every time you play'". Video game publisher Konami's vision for the game was that its content would be oriented towards relatively short, multiplayer sessions on a handheld console. This marked a departure from the gameplay of previous Sillent Hill titles, which featured single-player gameplay; previously, the possibility of including multiplayer gameplay had been mulled over for Silent Hill: Downpour during its beginning stages of development, but ultimately rejected out of worry that it would feel out of place and added on. The game developer WayForward began work on the game in September 2010, with Tomm Hulett as producer and Adam Tierney as director. A proof of concept for the PC was produced two months later: it used the third-person view found in the previous Silent Hill installments and featured a character wearing a hoodie. A prototype was begun in mid-December 2010, which used the game engine Infernal Engine. Originally, the game was intended to be more puzzle-based, where the camera would switch between an isometric view for the puzzles and an over-the-shoulder view for combat. WayForward decided the approach was not feasible because assets would have to be created from two different perspectives.

From January to February 2011, the major gameplay systems were decided on, while the character classes and environmental concept designs were finalized. Procedural level generation was included in the game, and the playable PC build showed off the new combat system with timed combos. In March and April, the concepts for the joke ending and story system were created and received approval from Konami; auditions for motion capture actors began on March 22, with the motion capture process starting on April 4. From May to July, the script for the game cinematics was worked on, and by August 8, the game systems had been finalized. During this time, Konami also announced Book of Memories at E3 2011 in June. Localization took place from September to December, during which the story scripts and the art for the joke ending were also finished. Book of Memories reached the alpha stage of development on October 24, with quality assurance testing happening from November 2011 into spring 2012. On January 15, Book of Memories entered the beta stage of development, and by spring, the North America edition had been finished. Book of Memories was published on October 16, 2012, in North America, November 2 in Europe, November 8 in Australia, and February 14, 2013, in Japan.

=== Music ===
Daniel Licht, who previously had composed the soundtrack for Silent Hill: Downpour, returned to work on Book of Memories. Talks to create the game's soundtrack began in March, and in September 2011 he sent in an early draft of the game's title music, "Now We Are Free". "Water World" was the first of the stage music pieces to be created, which Hulett described as "amazing", while the final song, "Rust World", followed in December. Rob King and voice actor Troy Baker also composed a song for the soundtrack, "Love Psalm", which took inspiration from the similarly named song on Silent Hill 2's soundtrack; it included vocals by Mary Elizabeth McGlynn and background vocals by Baker, and was performed by Eyeshine, featuring Akira Yamaoka. The soundtrack to Book of Memories was released on April 17, 2012.

Voice recording took place at PCB Productions in Los Angeles, California, in August and September 2011. The dialogue for each protagonist was recorded multiple times, including variations for each potential change in the game's narrative. The game's dialogue was recorded in eight languages.

== Reception ==
Reception

Aggregate score
Aggregator	Score
Metacritic	58/100

Review scores
Publication	Score
Destructoid	6.5/10
GameRevolution	4/5
GameSpot	6/10
GamesRadar+	2/5
IGN	6.0/10
Polygon	4/10
Hardcore Gamer	4/5

For July 2013, Silent Hill: Book of Memories was the fourth-best-selling PlayStation Vita game, behind Mortal Kombat, Lego Batman 2: DC Super Heroes, and Hotline Miami.

Book of Memories received "mixed or average" reviews, according to review aggregator Metacritic. Reviewers generally felt that the title was a significant departure from previous installments in the series and wrote that this drastic change might prove unappealing for some fans: some did locate a continuity of sorts in the game's themes and the reworked elements of survival horror and staples of the series, such as degradable weapons and item management. The graphics received praise as high-quality for a handheld title, although one reviewer wrote that the screen was too zoomed out to fully highlight this. Critics generally were divided on the plot: some derided it as nonsensical, less complex than in previous installments, and disconnected from the gameplay, while others appreciated the concept of the protagonist psychologically working through their troubles. The gameplay was better received, with its ability to be played in short intervals and its RPG elements highlighted as a strength. Reviewers generally disliked the relative dearth of checkpoints, the perceived underdevelopment of game mechanics beyond the basics, and the increased difficulty in later sections.

Consensus among critics as to whether Book of Memories succeeded as a dungeon-crawler in its own right was not reached. Some wrote that the game was fun entertainment, worked well as a game independent of the Silent Hill series, was promising despite flaws or was enjoyable despite a perceived lack of faithfulness to the trappings of the series, while others wrote that it failed to live up to the horror roots of the series, or suffered from an "identity crisis" as neither a faithful Silent Hill title nor an innovative dungeon-crawler.
