= Silent Hill: Downpour =

2012 video game

- European cover art
- Developer: Vatra Games
- Publisher: Konami
- Director: Andy Pang
- Producers: Alexander Sila; Devin Shatsky
- Designers: Brian Gomez; Marek Berka
- Programmer: Petr Benýšek
- Artists: Radek Marek; Luděk Farda
- Writers: Tom Waltz; Tomm Hulett; Devin Shatsky; Brian Gomez
- Composer: Daniel Licht
- Series: Silent Hill
- Engine: Unreal Engine 3
- Platforms: PlayStation 3; Xbox 360
- Release: NA: 13 March 2012; EU: 30 March 2012; AU: 5 April 2012; JP: 8 November 2012 (PS3)
- Genre: Survival horror
- Mode: Single-player

Silent Hill: Downpour is a 2012 survival horror game developed by Vatra Games and published by Konami. The seventh installment in the Silent Hill series, the game centers on Murphy Pendleton, a prisoner who enters the town of Silent Hill, periodically entering the otherworld, leading him to unlock repressed memories. The game uses a third-person view and can be played in 3D. It was released in March 2012.

Silent Hill: Downpour received mixed reviews from critics, who praised its atmosphere, story and return to the series' survival horror and exploration roots after the action-heavy linearity of Silent Hill: Homecoming, but criticised its monster design, combat and technical performance. A patch fixed many of the technical issues.

== Gameplay ==
A screenshot of Murphy in the town of Silent Hill

Silent Hill: Downpour is a survival horror game played from the over-the-shoulder perspective. The game uses a third-person view and can be played in 3D. The player controls Murphy Pendleton, an escaped convict, as he navigates the titular supernatural town. Downpour allows for more environmental exploration than previous installments in the series. Murphy explores the town on foot and can use the abandoned subway tunnels as a short-cut to various parts. At times, Murphy will need to directly interact with the environment to progress, pulling down fire escapes with hooks or destroying boarded-up doors, for example. Parts of his backstory can be learned from in-game notes and flashbacks; secret messages can be uncovered through the use of a UV flashlight, while clues and maps are stored in his journal to access freely. The player can shape Murphy's character through several moral choices presented, by allowing him to either act on or refuse opportunities to save non-player characters.

While exploring, Murphy may periodically encounter monsters, either alone or in groups. The monsters can harm him, causing his health to decline; as it does so, his clothes take on a bloodied and torn appearance to reflect this damage. Items to replenish his health can be found. Murphy can obtain a range of melee weapons, including chairs, bottles, shovels, and axes to defend himself, although he can only carry one at a time, which will gradually deteriorate with use and eventually break. Firearms and ammunition are limited, and Murphy has difficulty aiming guns. Murphy can fight with his fists, although this prevents him from blocking attacks. Additionally, phantom police cruisers roam the streets of Silent Hill; if one spots Murphy, a group of monsters will appear and attack him. The game features a weather system which alternates fog with varying degrees of rainfall; during heavy rainfall, monsters appear more frequently and behave more violently.

At scripted intervals, Murphy finds himself in the Otherworld, a supernatural, rusty location where he may have to solve a puzzle to progress, navigate traps, or successfully evade the red, indestructible light chasing him. The light causes him harm in close proximity, and being caught by it will lead to a game over. Murphy can attempt to slow it down by knocking items into its path. Other monsters can damage him as he attempts to escape, while the environment will often change during these sequences: doors may suddenly close when Murphy runs towards them, for example.

The game offers fourteen optional side quests, one of which is unlocked in a second playthrough. These are intended to replace the fetch quests in earlier Silent Hill games, which were necessary to progress and often involved a thematically related side story. In Downpour, some of the side quests consist of investigating a local murder scene, freeing caged birds, or returning stolen items to the unseen inhabitants of a local apartment complex. The side quests often end in a tangible reward for Murphy, and after a certain point in the narrative, they are no longer accessible.

== Plot ==
Silent Hill: Downpour focuses on Murphy Pendleton (David Boyd Konrad), who has been incarcerated for several years for stealing a police cruiser and crossing state borders. The game opens with his murder of the sequestered child molester and murderer, Patrick Napier (John Grace), in prison. After a riot, Murphy is placed under the supervision of officer Anne Cunningham (Kristin Price), who has significant animosity toward him, and is in the process of being transported to another penitentiary when the transport vehicle crashes near Silent Hill. Surviving the impact, Murphy finds himself unexpectedly free and decides to flee; Anne, having also survived, catches up to Murphy and tries to arrest him but falls down a cliff. Unknown to him, the town draws upon the psyche of its visitors, forming alternative versions of itself with symbols from their unconscious minds, mental states, and thoughts.

In his journey through the largely abandoned town, he encounters the cryptic postman Howard Blackwood (William Tate) (Note: Howard Blackwood first appeared as a side character in the spin-off comic Silent Hill: Past Life.) and travels to the Devil's Pit, a tourist attraction, where he encounters the suicidal park ranger J.P. Sater (Andy Hendrickson). Indirectly responsible for the deaths of eight children, Sater is eventually consumed by guilt and commits suicide. As the game progresses, it is revealed that Murphy made a deal with the corrupt corrections officer George Sewell (Joel Bernard), to gain access to Napier, who had abused and drowned Murphy's son, Charlie. Murphy locates DJ Bobby Ricks (Antoine L. Smith), who has been dedicating songs to him to attract his attention. Although he has been trapped by the town, Ricks proposes a plan to escape by boat; his keys, however, have been lost. Before they can leave, Anne confronts them, and all three are attacked by monsters. Murphy regains consciousness to find himself alone again. Led to a monastery on the premise of collecting a deceased relative, Murphy encounters the Bogeyman, a sledgehammer-wielding monster who murders a child in front of him. Murphy finds it again, seemingly lifeless, and learns that it is the relative he is intended to collect. Murphy confesses Napier's murder did not bring him any solace. Spotting the keys to Ricks's boat around its neck, Murphy seizes them and is drawn into a confrontation with the monster.

After defeating it, Murphy tries to leave the town by boat, to be stopped by Anne. She shoots him when he refuses to return to the town. He wakes in a prison in the Otherworld and eventually kills the Wheelman, a massive, mute creature in a wheelchair by disabling its life support. Afterwards, Murphy relives the favor he had to repay Sewell, which required him to kill Frank Coleridge (Leer Leary), another corrections officer who was planning to testify against Sewell's corruption and who believed in Murphy. Anne reveals that Coleridge was her father, and after the attack, he lived in a vegetative state until his death years later. Motivated by revenge, Anne had arranged for Murphy's transfer to her prison. In the final sequence of the game, the perspective shifts to reveal that Anne sees Murphy as the Bogeyman: he transforms into the Bogeyman and follows her as she attempts to kill him.

There are six endings available, based on choices made throughout the game, most significantly the final fight between Anne and Bogeyman Murphy. If Murphy does not kill Anne, the "Forgiveness" and "Truth and Justice" endings show that Sewell framed Murphy for his attack on Coleridge: in both endings, Anne forgives Murphy, and the pair are transported outside of Silent Hill where Anne reports Murphy's death, allowing him to escape; "Truth and Justice" additionally shows Anne seeking revenge against Sewell by confronting him in his office. If Murphy kills Anne, the "Full Circle" and "Execution" endings reveal that Murphy did kill Coleridge: "Full Circle" has Murphy commit suicide out of guilt, only to awake in an Otherworld prison to relive the events again, observed by the Wheelman, while "Execution" has Murphy executed for the murder of Charlie by Sewell. If Anne kills Murphy, the "Reversal" ending has her awaken as a prison inmate in events mirroring scenes of Murphy in prison, with Murphy taking Sewell's role. A joke ending can be obtained that shows Murphy tunneling out of his cell, to be greeted on the other side by a party in his honor, with various characters from the game and series present: this is the first joke ending in the series to not feature unidentified flying objects.

== Development ==
Silent Hill: Downpour was developed by Vatra Games, using the Unreal Engine 3. Given the working title Silent Hill 8 at the Electronic Entertainment Expo 2010, the game was speculated to potentially be a first-person shooter, which would have marked a dramatic shift from the usual gameplay format of the series, though the first-person perspective had been used in some segments of Silent Hill 4: The Room and in the rail shooter Silent Hill: The Arcade. While this speculation was untrue, an option for multiplayer gaming had been discussed in Downpour's early stages of development.

The narrative of Downpour was intended to be a self-contained story in the same vein as Silent Hill 2: while in development, the only requirement was that the story should focus on visitors to the titular town, rather than being part of any overarching narrative involving Alessa and the town's cult. Early on, the decision had been made to feature a criminal as the protagonist in a Silent Hill game for its potential to surprise players who had become accustomed to the usual tropes and plot developments of the series, namely that a seemingly ordinary character is revealed to have an unsettling secret in their backstory or becomes entangled in the town's dark past. Murphy was intended to evoke a measure of discomfort for the player, whether that be through his criminal background, or the questions raised by his presence in Silent Hill. The concept of a criminal protagonist met with some objections when first suggested to the developers at Vatra Games, some of whom did not want the game to center around a "bad guy". Murphy's criminality also divided participants in early focus testing, with it having a negative impact on players who found "certain elements" of it to be off-putting, while others were unconcerned or enjoyed it.

After deciding on the concept of a criminal protagonist, the thematic elements of his Otherworld were considered, with water eventually chosen. Rain was decided on as a "scary" manifestation of water, because of the darkness that comes during a storm and that as a result, "[y]our eyes might play tricks on you". The history and atmosphere of Brno, Czech Republic, the location of Vatra Games, influenced Downpour. According to design director Brian Gomez, the surrounding markers of the "macabre" history of the Czech Republic, such as its seventeenth-century mummies in the Capuchin Crypt or material reminders of the Soviet regime in the mid-twentieth century, lent the game a "certain heaviness". A nearby gorge, Propast Macocha ("Stepmother Abyss"), provided the inspiration for the "Devil's Pit" level of the game.

=== Music ===
With Downpour, long-time composer for the Silent Hill series Akira Yamaoka was replaced by Daniel Licht. Licht studied the music from previous games to allow him to score the game's soundtrack with musical themes in line with the traditional sound of the series but which also had his personal touch. He worked with regular series vocalist Mary Elizabeth McGlynn on several tracks and considered her voice crucial to the music. Despite the influence of water on the narrative of the game, he avoided musical instruments that incorporated water, such as the waterphone, in favor of vocals, strings, guitar, mandolin, and "industrial sounds and ambiences". The mandolin in particular was chosen as a musical nod to the theme of the first Silent Hill game.

Downpour's main theme, "Silent Hill", was performed by the American nu metal band Korn. Konami selected the band from the options available to them, and the theme song did not comprise a significant part of Downpour's gameplay; in response to the announcement of Korn's work on the game, a group of fans created an online petition for the removal of the main theme from Downpour. The soundtrack was published on 13 March 2012 by Milan Records.

== Release ==
Silent Hill: Downpour was initially slated to be released in October 2011, but the release date was later pushed back to March 2012. In 2012, Konami published Downpour for the Xbox 360 and PlayStation 3 on 13 March in North America, on 30 March in Europe, and on 5 April in Australia. The PlayStation 3 version was released on 8 November 2012 in Japan. An official patch for the frame rate and saving issues for both consoles was released later that year. In 2016, Downpour was made backwards compatible with the Xbox One gaming console.

As part of a promotion for the game, video game publisher Konami held a Facebook contest from 10–16 February 2011, which invited its Silent Hill fans to design an original graveyard sculpture that would appear in the finished game.

A spin-off comic, Anne's Story, was written by Tom Waltz and illustrated by Tristan Jones. Based on downloadable content for Downpour that was never released, it centers on Anne and her parallel journey through Silent Hill as she attempts to capture Murphy. IDW Publishing released the four issues in print from September to December 2014, and reprinted them as part of the second volume of the Silent Hill Omnibus in October 2015.

== Critical reception ==
Reception

Aggregate score
Aggregator	Score
Metacritic	(X360) 68/100 (PS3) 64/100

Review scores
Publication	Score
1Up.com	C−
Destructoid	8/10
Electronic Gaming Monthly	7.5/10
Eurogamer	6/10
Famitsu	8/10, 8/10, 7/10, 8/10
Game Informer	7/10
GameRevolution	2/5
GameSpot	7.5/10
GamesRadar+	7/10
GameTrailers	5.2/10
IGN	4.5/10
Joystiq	3.5/5
PlayStation Official Magazine – UK	6/10
Official Xbox Magazine (UK)	7/10
Official Xbox Magazine (US)	7.5/10
X-Play	2.5/5

Silent Hill: Downpour received "mixed or average" reviews, according to review aggregator platform Metacritic. In general, most critics praised the game's story and atmosphere but criticized the combat and technical performance.

Game Informer gave it a 7/10, stating: "I don't regret my time with Silent Hill: Downpour, but mediocrity hung over most of my playthrough". Destructoid gave it an 8/10, stating: "When it's not forcing a sub-par combat system on players, and when it allows itself to be as imaginative as it can be, Silent Hill: Downpour is a stylish, slickly produced, beautifully foreboding game". Games Radar gave it a 7/10, writing: "In spite of its flaws, Silent Hill: Downpour does manage to be smart and imaginative in bursts ... The actual gameplay leaves a lot to be desired, but as recent Silent Hills go, this is one of the better ones". GameSpot gave the game a 7.5/10, saying "Downpour makes some questionable tweaks to the established formula, but those decisions distinguish it from the rest of the series". Official Xbox Magazine summed up its review with "the game's many puzzles and open-world areas did leave us aimlessly wondering and wandering. But varied gameplay, solid combat, and an effective mix of psychological scares and freaky encounters make Downpour a worthwhile trip", giving the game a 7.5/10.

One of the most negative reviews came from IGN, which gave it 4.5/10. The review said that "the most frustrating thing about Silent Hill: Downpour isn't the lousy combat, dull exploration, or even the technical gaffes. It's the fact that every now and then while playing through the game's story, you'll see signs of brilliance; sunlight hinted from behind the overcast sky".

Several reviews singled out the soundtrack for praise, although one criticized the overall sound design, saying dead silence too often made combat commonplace instead of terrifying. The Joystiq review stated Licht did an "admirable job" with the score, yet lamented that "the loss of longtime series composer Akira Yamaoka may be Downpour's biggest detriment."
