= Climax Studios =

British video game developer

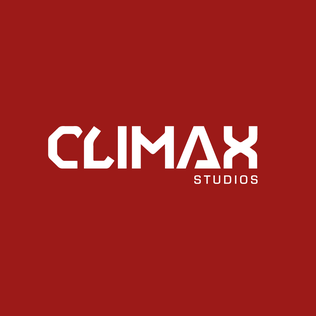
- Formerly: Images Software (1988–1995); The Climax Group (1995–2005)
- Type: Subsidiary
- Industry: Video games
- Founded: 3 February 1988; 38 years ago
- Founder: Karl Jeffery
- Headquarters: Cosham, Portsmouth, England
- Key people: Ben Potton (head of Climax Studios)
- Parent: Keywords Studios (2021–present)
- Website: www.climaxstudios.com

Climax Studios is a British video game developer based in Portsmouth that is best known for its work on the 2004 action role-playing game Sudeki and the 2007 and 2009 survival horror video games Silent Hill: Origins and Silent Hill: Shattered Memories from the Silent Hill franchise.

== History ==
Climax was founded by Karl Jeffery on 3 February 1988. It was originally known as Images Software Ltd., and its initial focus was on developing and porting games for the generation of home computers, consoles and handhelds.

In October 1998, Climax announced the establishment of Climax PC Studio, a sub-studio focused on personal computer game development and located in an office next to Climax's headquarters. Another such studio, Climax Game Boy World, was launched during E3 1999 and focused on the development for the Game Boy family of handheld game devices. Pixel Planet, a Brighton-based studio founded in September 1999 by Tony Beckwith and Greg Michael, entered into a partnership with Climax in November 1999 that saw Pixel Planet become part of the Climax group, being renamed Climax Brighton. This was followed up by Nottingham-based Anthill Studios, which was acquired in June 2000 and renamed "Climax Nottingham". The studio, under the continued leadership of founder Paul Carruthers, was put in charge of the game Warhammer Online, based on Games Workshop's Warhammer franchise. By this point, the main studios in the Climax group's Fareham headquarters had been consolidated under "Climax Fareham". The Climax Brighton studio moved to Hove in August 2000. When the studio Charybdis saw large redundancies in staff in April 2001, Climax announced its intent to hire 20 of its former staff at the Nottingham studio. Climax also acquired Syrox Developments of Kingston-upon-Thames in June 2001. In July 2001, Geoff Heath was named Climax's chairman.

The flagship Climax Fareham studio moved to Portsmouth, into offices in the Gunwharf Quays centre, in July 2002, being renamed "Climax Solent". The administrative portion of the Climax group remained in Fareham. A fifth studio based in Venice, California was opened in October 2003. In November 2004, Climax consolidated its London and Solent studios under the name "Climax Action" and rebranded the Brighton and Nottingham studios as "Climax Racing" and "Climax Online", respectively.

On May 9, 2006 at E3 2006, Konami announced that Climax LA was working on the next entry in the popular Silent Hill franchise of horror games, instead of Team Silent, because they were working on their own project. It was titled Silent Hill: Origins and exclusively announced for the PlayStation Portable. At the time, the game was expected to be released in late 2006. The studio incurred a significant reduction in head count by 14 people in October 2006, a move that reportedly resulted in that the development of Silent Hill: Origins to be moved to Climax Action in the UK, alongside issues with the game's engine and "a confused high-level vision for the game". The release date was pushed back from late 2006 to late 2007. Climax LA has closed down its development operations in Santa Monica for unspecified reasons and it was turned into the US division for business development on February 23, 2007. In November 2007 the game was released to positive reviews. In 2008 a PlayStation 2 version of the game followed.

Climax's Kingston studio was closed in February 2008, leaving the Portsmouth headquarters as the only remaining studio.

In 2009 it was announced that Climax was working on another Silent Hill game for Nintendo's Wii console titled Shattered Memories. The game was announced as a remake of the original Silent Hill game, although the term "re-imagining" was used to emphasise that it was going to provide a completely new experience. Later versions for the PlayStation 2 and PlayStation Portable were also announced.

In recent years Climax has developed and published a number of VR titles, including Lola and The Giant (which was featured at Google's I/O'17 event), Bandit Six, Gun Sight, DCL: The Game and Dirt Rally 2.0 which was co-developed with Codemasters.

In 2007, following a rumour that had been going around the industry about a possible sale of the company, Jeffery confirmed that he had owned 100% of the studio's shares, denying any of the rumours about an acquisition. The studio would then later be acquired by Keywords Studios in April 2021 for £47 million. In 2024, the company opened a new office based on Edinburgh.

== Former development subsidiaries ==
- Climax PC Studio - Established Oct 1998.
- Climax Game Boy World - Established July 1999.
- Climax Racing (Climax Brighton) - Formerly Pixel Planet; partnership entered into September 1999. Sold to Buena Vista Games in September 2006 and later renamed to Black Rock Studio.
- Climax Online (Climax Nottingham) - Formerly Anthill Studios; acquired June 2000.
- Climax Kingston - Formerly Syrox Developments; acquired June 2001. Closed in February 2008.
- Climax LA - Established May 2003. Development operations were closed down on February 23, 2007 and it was turned into the US division for business development.
- Climax Action (Climax Solent and Climax London) - Consolidated November 2004.
