= Silent Hill =

Video game franchise

- Logo since 2022
- Genre: Survival horror
- Developers: Team Silent (1999–2006); Konami Digital Entertainment (2006–2007, 2024); Kojima Productions (2014); Third-party developers: Will Corporation (2001); Creature Labs (2002); Polygon Magic (2007); Gamefederation Studio (2007–2008); Climax Studios (2007–2009); Double Helix Games (2008); Playsoft Games (2010); Vatra Games (2012); Hijinx Studios (2012); WayForward Technologies (2012); Genvid Technologies (2023); Bad Robot Games (2023); Behaviour Interactive (2023); HexaDrive (2024); Bloober Team (2024–present); NeoBards Entertainment (2025); Screen Burn Interactive (2026)
- Publishers: Konami Digital Entertainment (1999–present); Genvid Entertainment (2023); Annapurna Interactive (2026)
- Creator: Keiichiro Toyama
- Composers: Akira Yamaoka (1999–2009, 2024–2025); Noisycroak (2001); Will Music (2001); Masayuki Maruyama (2007); Jun Ito (2007); Daniel Licht (2012); Ludvig Forssell (2014); NEKOFACE (2023); Kensuke Inage (2025); dai (2025); xaki (2025); Pilotpriest (2026)
- Platform: Various: PlayStation; Game Boy Advance; PlayStation 2; Xbox; Microsoft Windows; FOMA; Java ME; Arcade; PlayStation Portable; PlayStation 3; Xbox 360; iOS; Wii; Android; PlayStation Vita; PlayStation 4; Web browser; PlayStation 5; Xbox Series X/S
- First release: Silent Hill; February 24, 1999; 27 years ago
- Latest release: Silent Hill: Townfall; September 24, 2026; 59 days ago

Silent Hill (Note: Stylized in all caps) (Japanese: サイレントヒル, Hepburn: Sairento Hiru) is a Japanese horror franchise centered on a series of survival horror video games created by Team Silent and published by Konami. The franchise is primarily set in Silent Hill, a fictional American town plagued by supernatural events, the occult, and dreams manifested into physical form, often taking the shape of horrific environments and creatures stalking the protagonists. The series is heavily influenced by the literary genre of psychological horror, with its player characters being mostly "everymen". The franchise has expanded to include various printed works, three film adaptations, and various spin-off games.

The first four games (Silent Hill, Silent Hill 2, Silent Hill 3, and Silent Hill 4: The Room) were developed from 1999 to 2004 by Team Silent, a Japanese development team within Konami, and received critical acclaim. The next four games (Silent Hill: Origins, Silent Hill: Homecoming, Silent Hill: Shattered Memories and Silent Hill: Downpour) were developed from 2007 to 2012 by Western companies, but garnered much less positive reviews. P.T. was released in 2014 and received critical acclaim, which revealed a new game, Silent Hills being developed by Kojima Productions, a Japanese development team within Konami at that time. The game was cancelled in 2015 and the franchise went dormant for nearly 10 years. Since then, Konami has revived the series in 2022 with new entries such as Silent Hill: The Short Message, the remake of Silent Hill 2, Silent Hill f, Silent Hill: Townfall, and the upcoming remake of the first game.

As of September 2026, the games have collectively sold over 19.2 million copies worldwide.

== Overview ==
Release timeline Main series in bold
1999	**Silent Hill**
2000
2001	Play Novel
2001	**Silent Hill 2**
2002
2003	**Silent Hill 3**
2004	**Silent Hill 4: The Room**
2005
2006	The Silent Hill Collection
2006	Silent Hill (**mobile**)
2007	The Arcade
2007	Orphan
2007	**Silent Hill: Origins**
2007	The Escape
2008	Orphan 2
2008	**Silent Hill: Homecoming**
2009	Shattered Memories
2010	Orphan 3
2011
2012	**Silent Hill: Downpour**
2012	HD Collection
2012	Book of Memories
2013
2014	P.T.
2015–2022
2023	Ascension
2024	The Short Message
2024	Silent Hill 2 (**remake**)
2025	Silent Hill f
2026	Silent Hill: Townfall
TBA	Silent Hill (**remake**)

=== Main series ===
==== Silent Hill (1999) ====
The first installment in the series follows Harry Mason as he searches for his missing adopted daughter in the mysterious Maine town of Silent Hill. Stumbling upon a cult conducting a ritual to revive a deity it worships, Harry discovers his daughter's true origin. Multiple game endings are possible depending on the in-game actions taken by the player. The game was released in 1999 for the PlayStation. In 2009, it became available for download from the European PlayStation Network store for the PlayStation 3 and the PlayStation Portable, and later that year from the North American PlayStation Network store.

==== Silent Hill 2 (2001) ====
The second installment in the series follows James Sunderland as he searches for his deceased wife Mary in Silent Hill after receiving a letter supposedly from her, informing him that she is waiting for him there. After searching and exploring the mysterious town, he ultimately realizes the true nature of her death. The game was released in September 2001 for the PlayStation 2. An extended version of the game was released for the Xbox in December of the same year as Silent Hill 2: Restless Dreams in North America and Silent Hill 2: Inner Fears in Europe, and for the PlayStation 2 in 2003 as Silent Hill 2: Director's Cut, with a port of Director's Cut to Microsoft Windows released in February 2003.

==== Silent Hill 3 (2003) ====
The third installment in the series follows a teenage girl named Heather as she becomes caught in a conflict within Silent Hill's cult and discovers her true origin. It was released in May 2003 for the PlayStation 2, with a port to Microsoft Windows released in October of the same year. It is a direct sequel to the first game.

==== Silent Hill 4: The Room (2004) ====
The fourth installment in the series follows Henry Townshend, who finds himself locked in his apartment as strange phenomena begin to unfold around him and the other residents of the building. It was released in 2004 for the PlayStation 2, Xbox, and Microsoft Windows, and marked the end of Team Silent's work on the series.

==== Silent Hill: Origins (2007) ====
The fifth installment in the series is a prequel to the first game and follows trucker Travis Grady, who becomes trapped in Silent Hill after rescuing a girl from a burning house. During his quest to discover the fate of the girl, he encounters characters from the first game and is forced to face his own past. It was developed by British company Climax Studios and released in 2007 for the PlayStation Portable, with a port for the PlayStation 2 released in 2008. This was also the first Silent Hill title developed outside Japan. It is known as Silent Hill Zero in Japan.

==== Silent Hill: Homecoming (2008) ====
The sixth installment in the series follows Alex Shepherd, a soldier who has returned from a war overseas. Upon his arrival, Alex discovers that his father has gone missing, his mother has become catatonic, and nobody can provide the whereabouts of his younger brother. The game chronicles Alex's search to find his missing brother. It was developed by American company Double Helix Games and released in 2008 for the PlayStation 3 and Xbox 360, and in 2009 for Microsoft Windows.

==== Silent Hill: Downpour (2012) ====
Series logo used in 2012

The seventh installment in the series follows Murphy Pendleton, a prisoner who becomes stranded in Silent Hill after his prison transport vehicle crashes. Announced in April 2010, it was developed by Czech company Vatra Games and released for the PlayStation 3 and Xbox 360 on March 13, 2012. It is the only game in the series that can be played in stereoscopic 3D.

=== Remakes ===
==== Silent Hill: Shattered Memories (2009) ====
Shattered Memories is a re-imagining of the first game, developed by Climax Studios for the Wii and released in December 2009, with ports for the PlayStation 2 and PlayStation Portable released in January 2010. The game retains the premise of the original—Harry Mason's quest to find his missing daughter in Silent Hill—but is set in what appears to be a different fictional universe, following a different plot, with characters from the first game appearing altered alongside new ones.

==== Silent Hill 2 (2024) ====
A remake of Silent Hill 2 was announced in October 2022 for the PlayStation 5 and PC, developed by the Polish company Bloober Team. Akira Yamaoka, the original composer for the series, returned to compose the score for this game and future entries. The remake was released in October 2024.

==== Silent Hill (TBA) ====
A remake of the first Silent Hill was announced in June 2025. It will be developed by Bloober Team following the success of their Silent Hill 2 remake.

In October 2026, IGN reported that Konami unveils a new leak from MP1ST suggests work has been underway since 2022 and the game is targeting a 2027 launch. The cast its actors under the codename “Project Noise,” and features Gabrielle Fritz and Jade Matthew rumored to be major roles.

=== Adaptations ===
==== Play Novel: Silent Hill (2001) ====
Play Novel: Silent Hill is a visual novel adaptation of the original Silent Hill, released exclusively for the Game Boy Advance in Japan on March 21, 2001. It has been fan-translated into English.

==== Silent Hill (mobile game) (2006) ====
Silent Hill is a mobile game adaptation of the original Silent Hill. It was released in Japan for the FOMA phone on July 5, 2006, and for Java ME on January 17, 2007.

=== Compilations ===
==== The Silent Hill Collection (2006) ====
The Silent Hill Collection is a re-release of the first four mainline video games in the series for the PlayStation 2. The European release contains Silent Hill 2, Silent Hill 3, and Silent Hill 4: The Room, while the Japanese release also includes the first Silent Hill.

==== Silent Hill HD Collection (2012) ====
Silent Hill HD Collection is a high-definition re-release of Silent Hill 2 and Silent Hill 3 for the PlayStation 3 and Xbox 360, featuring high-resolution visuals, new sounds, new voices, and Trophies/Achievements for both games. Silent Hill 2 includes the option to use both the old and new voices; however, Silent Hill 3 features only a new voice track, as the old voices were unavailable for legal reasons. Silent Hill 2 also features both the main scenario and the Born from a Wish sub-scenario, as seen in later re-releases such as the Director's Cut.

This collection marked the first time Silent Hill 3 was playable on an Xbox console. The collection received mixed to negative reviews due to severe issues with both games, such as significant framerate problems, lockups, and more. While the PlayStation 3 version was patched, the Xbox 360 patch was canceled, and Konami offered refunds to all Xbox 360 owners of the game.

=== Spin-offs ===
==== Silent Hill: The Arcade (2007) ====
Silent Hill: The Arcade is an arcade game that follows two characters, Eric and Tina, who have entered the town of Silent Hill and must battle monsters while uncovering the mystery behind Eric's nightmares about a girl and a steamship. The game has a multiplayer element, where each player can choose to be either Eric or Tina. A second player can join the game at any time.

==== Silent Hill: Orphan (2007) ====
Silent Hill: Orphan is a mobile game set in an abandoned orphanage, featuring first-person, point-and-click gameplay.

==== Silent Hill: The Escape (2007) ====
Silent Hill: The Escape is a mobile game released in Japan for the FOMA phone on December 19, 2007, and internationally for iOS in 2009. The goal of the game is to guide the player through ten stages by finding a key and opening the locked door. It is played from a first-person perspective. The game received mixed reviews due to its lack of storyline and poor execution.

==== Silent Hill: Orphan 2 (2008) ====
Silent Hill: Orphan 2 is a mobile game and a sequel to Silent Hill: Orphan.

==== Silent Hill: Orphan 3 (2010) ====
Silent Hill: Orphan 3 is a mobile game and a sequel to Silent Hill: Orphan 2.

==== Silent Hill: Book of Memories (2012) ====
Silent Hill: Book of Memories was released for the PlayStation Vita. Book of Memories utilizes an overhead isometric view, follows a different storyline, and features returning creatures from the series' fictional universe, as well as cooperative gameplay. The game is the first installment in the series to feature multiplayer gameplay, apart from The Arcade. According to series producer Tomm Hulett, Book of Memories' gameplay is largely different from that of previous installments, focusing on cooperative multiplayer action rather than traditional psychological horror.

==== P.T. and Silent Hills (2014) (cancelled) ====
During Sony Computer Entertainment's presentation at Gamescom 2014, an interactive teaser titled P.T. (initialism for "playable teaser") was released on the PlayStation Store for PlayStation 4. The teaser revealed a new Silent Hill game entitled Silent Hills, being developed by Kojima Productions using the Fox Engine, in collaboration with Hideo Kojima and film director Guillermo del Toro, featuring actor Norman Reedus. On September 1, Sony revealed during its pre-TGS press conference that P.T. had been downloaded over a million times and viewed over 30 million times across platforms. During the 2015 San Francisco Film Festival on April 26, del Toro revealed that he would no longer be involved in the project with Kojima, presumably due to Kojima leaving Konami. Konami later released a statement confirming Reedus's departure but clarified that the series would continue to be developed, with no mention of the current status of Silent Hills. Days later, Konami confirmed that Silent Hills was canceled but was open to future collaborations with Reedus and del Toro. P.T. was pulled from the PlayStation Store and is no longer available for download. Numerous remakes of P.T. have emerged due to the game's extremely limited availability; it remains unavailable on the PlayStation Store and has since been blocked from running on the PlayStation 5.

The cancellation of the game was met with significant backlash from fans, who later started a petition on Change.org asking for Konami to continue the project. The petition has received 194,479 signatures.

==== Silent Hill: The Short Message (2024) ====
Following messages from her deceased friend Maya, Anita finds herself at a crumbling and abandoned apartment block in the economically depressed German town of Kettenstadt, infamous for rumors of suicides. Drawn inside, Anita soon finds her sense of reality shattered as she encounters bizarre, otherworldly spaces haunted by a twisted monster.

==== Silent Hill f (2025) ====
A spin-off entitled Silent Hill f was announced in October 2022. The story was written by Ryukishi07. It was developed by Hong Kong-based company NeoBards Entertainment for Microsoft Windows, PlayStation 5, and Xbox Series X/S, with creative contributions from character designer kera and producer Motoi Okamoto. The game is set in the fictional rural Japanese town of Ebisugaoka during the 1960s and follows high school student Shimizu Hinako.

==== Silent Hill: Townfall (2026) ====
A new game, Silent Hill: Townfall, was announced in October 2022 with a reveal trailer. It was developed by British developer Screen Burn Interactive and co-published by Japanese company Konami Digital Entertainment and US company Annapurna Interactive. A new trailer was released on February 12, 2026. The game set in 1996 in the fictional Scottish coastal town of St. Amelia, it follows Simon Ordell after he wakes up in a place he seemingly has no connection to.

==== Future ====
Following the release of Silent Hill f, video game producer Motoi Okamoto in an interview with Famitsu stated he wants to see Konami release a new Silent Hill game every year, focusing on global reach such as Latin America, Italy, Russia, Thailand, and South Korea.

In October 2026, Okamoto is already looking ahead to the second and third waves of Silent Hill games during the Famitsu interview. He discussed how he had to convince Konami’s higher-ups to approve three titles in the franchise.

== Recurring elements ==
=== Plot traits and symbolism ===
The individual installments in Silent Hill contain various forms of symbolism. The symbols are images, sounds, objects, creatures, or situations that represent concepts and facts, as well as the feelings, emotions, and mental states of the characters.

The plots of most installments in the Silent Hill series share a common setting: the fictional American town of Silent Hill. The town in the first three games was inspired by the concept of small-town America, as depicted by various media from different countries. While some of the development planning is more reminiscent of a Japanese village, two real American towns also influenced development: Cushing, Maine, and Snoqualmie, Washington. Cushing is the hometown of Stephen King, whose novel Carrie and short stories "The Mist" and "1408" are among known influences on Silent Hill. Snoqualmie served as the main exterior filming location of the David Lynch series Twin Peaks, and the first four Silent Hill games are rife with Twin Peaks references and influences.

In the film adaptations, Silent Hill's location was changed to West Virginia and it was mainly inspired by Centralia, Pennsylvania, which was abandoned due to a five-decade inability to extinguish a local coal mine fire. In Shattered Memories, Silent Hill is depicted as a snowy town in the midst of a blizzard, while the events of The Room primarily occur in the fictional neighboring city of South Ashfield, with the player venturing to smaller locales around Silent Hill.

The series' characters experience an occasional dark alteration of reality called the "Otherworld". In this reality, physical laws often do not apply, with varying forms but most frequently ones whose physical appearance is based on that of Silent Hill. Characters often experience delusions and encounter tangible symbols of elements from their unconscious minds, mental states, and innermost thoughts when present in the Otherworld, manifested into the real world. The origin of these manifestations is a malevolent power that haunts Silent Hill and materializes human thoughts, but was formerly benign until it was corrupted by certain events that occurred in the area.

A recurring plot point in many Silent Hill stories is a fictional religious cult known as The Order, with members of the organization acting as antagonists in several of the series' installments (such as Dahlia in the first game and Origins, Claudia in the third game, Walter in The Room, and Judge Holloway in Homecoming). The Order operates the "Wish House" (also called "Hope House"), an orphanage for poor and homeless children, run by a charity organization called the Silent Hill Smile Support Society (4S).

The religion followed by the Order is focused on the worship of a chief deity, named Samael in Origins, but simply referred to as God in the previous games. The group's dogma is derived from a myth: the deity set out to create paradise but ran out of power during the process and will someday be resurrected, thus becoming able to finally create paradise and save mankind. The town's cult repeatedly engages in illegal acts such as ritual human sacrifices intended for the deity's resurrection, the illegal drug trade, and the kidnapping and confinement of children in a facility to brainwash them while presenting the facility as an orphanage. The series also features various religious items with magical properties, which appear widely throughout the games.

Two thematic elements consistently drive the narratives of Silent Hill games: the theme of a main protagonist depicted as an "everyman" (with the exceptions of Homecoming and Downpour, where the protagonists are depicted as being an experienced soldier and a convict respectively), and the protagonist's quest, either a search for a missing loved one or a scenario where the protagonist wanders into the town apparently by accident but is actually being "summoned" by a spiritual force in the town.

Multiple endings are a staple of the series, with all installments featuring some, the realization of which often depends on in-game actions performed by the player. In all but three of the series' games, one of these endings is a joke ending in which the main protagonist encounters UFOs: Downpour and Book of Memories instead feature joke endings which incorporate characters from previous installments of the franchise, while The Room does not include a joke ending at all.

=== Gameplay ===
Visibility in the series is mostly low due to fog or darkness.

The installments in the Silent Hill series primarily use a third-person view, with occasional fixed camera angles. Visibility is often low due to the alternating fog and darkness. All of the series' player characters, except Henry Townshend of Silent Hill 4: The Room and Hinako Shimizu of Silent Hill f, are equipped with a flashlight and a portable device that warns the player of nearby monsters by emitting static: a transistor radio in Origins and the first three installments, a walkie-talkie in Homecoming and Downpour, a camera phone in Shattered Memories, and a handheld television in Townfall.

With the exception of Shattered Memories, which is designed entirely without combat, the player characters in every Silent Hill game typically have access to a variety of melee weapons and/or firearms, with Origins and Downpour also featuring rudimentary hand-to-hand combat: games developed after Shattered Memories tend to increase the emphasis on evading creatures as opposed to confronting them. Another key feature of the series' gameplay is puzzle-solving, which often results in the acquisition of an item essential to advancing in the games.

== Development ==
=== Concept and influences ===
The development of the Silent Hill series began in September 1996 with the creation of its first installment, Silent Hill. The game was created by Team Silent, a group of staff members within the Konami Computer Entertainment Tokyo studio. The new owners of its parent company, Konami, aimed to produce a game that would be successful in the United States. For this reason, a Hollywood-like atmosphere was proposed. Despite the profit-oriented approach of the parent company, the developers of Silent Hill had significant artistic freedom because the game was still produced in the era of lower-budget 2D titles. Eventually, the development staff decided to ignore the limits of Konami's initial plan and to make Silent Hill a game that would appeal to the emotions of players instead.

The scenario for the first installment was created by director Keiichiro Toyama. The story of the second installment, Silent Hill 2, was conceived by CGI creator Takayoshi Sato, who based it on the novel Crime and Punishment, with individual members of the team collaborating on the game's actual scenario. The main writing was done by Hiroyuki Owaku and Sato.

The first game, Silent Hill, utilizes real-time 3D environments. To mitigate the limitations of the hardware, developers extensively used fog and darkness to obscure the graphics.

Sato estimated the budget of the first installment at $3–5 million and Silent Hill 2's at $7–10 million. He said that the development team intended to make Silent Hill a masterpiece rather than a traditional sales-oriented game, opting for an engaging story that would persist over time—similar to successful literature.

The games are known to have drawn influence from media such as Jacob's Ladder, Phantoms, Twin Peaks, Hellraiser, Stephen King's The Mist, The Lost World, and the art of Francis Bacon, largely through cultivating a technique of inducing fear through more psychological levels of perception. Many sequences and tropes from these films share identical concepts. The films and television series of American filmmaker David Lynch are also acknowledged to have influenced Team Silent during the production of the initial games, especially Silent Hill 2.

Another major influence is Japanese horror, with comparisons made to classical Japanese Noh theatre and early 20th-century fiction writers, such as Edogawa Rampo. The town of Silent Hill is a small rural American town imagined by the creative team. It was based on Western literature and films, as well as on depictions of American towns in European and Russian culture. The version of the town from the film adaptations of the first and third games is loosely based on the central Pennsylvania town of Centralia. (Note: A modern ghost town, engulfed in smoke because of a still burning fire in an underground coal mine.)

The Order's religion is based on various characteristics of different religions, such as the origins of Christianity, Aztec rituals, Shinto shrines, as well as Japanese folklore. The names of gods in the organization's religion were conceived by Hiroyuki Owaku, but they have Aztec and Mayan motifs, as Owaku used pronunciations from these civilizations as a reference. Certain religious items appearing in the series were conceived by the team, and for others, various religions were used as a basis. The evil spirit-dispelling substance Aglaophotis, which appears in the first installment and Silent Hill 3, is based on a herb of similar name and nature in the Kabbalah (Jewish mysticism). The name of the talisman called the "Seal of Metatron" references the angel Metatron.

The title of Silent Hill is derived from Japan's prefecture Shizuoka Prefecture – translated literally, shizuoka (静岡県) means "silent hill". This was because one of the staff members was from Shizuoka Prefecture.

=== Audio ===
The installments in the Silent Hill series feature various sound effects, some of which are ambient, as well as periods of silence. These sound effects are designed to induce certain emotions and feelings in the player, such as urgency, discomfort, or a sense of psychological disturbance. According to the series' former sound director, Akira Yamaoka, atmosphere is a crucial element of the series, and without it, the series' production would have been impossible. The games also feature soundtracks scored by Yamaoka.

The musical pieces range in genre from industrial to trip hop to rock, with some tracks featuring vocals by voice actress Mary Elizabeth McGlynn. The music of Silent Hill 3 and Silent Hill 4 also includes performance and songwriting contributions from musician and voice actor Joe Romersa. Downpour and Book of Memories feature soundtracks scored by composer Daniel Licht; Downpour includes music in the industrial genre, with vocals by McGlynn as well as by Jonathan Davis of the band Korn.

== Reception and legacy ==
Aggregate review scores
Game	Metacritic
Silent Hill	(PS1) 86/100
Silent Hill 2	(PS2) 89/100 (Xbox) 84/100 (PC) 70/100
Silent Hill 3	(PS2) 85/100 (PC) 72/100
Silent Hill 4: The Room	(PS2) 76/100 (Xbox) 76/100 (PC) 67/100
Silent Hill: Origins	(PSP) 78/100 (PS2) 70/100
Silent Hill: Homecoming	(PS3) 71/100 (X360) 70/100 (PC) 64/100
Silent Hill: Shattered Memories	(Wii) 79/100 (PS2) 77/100 (PSP) 73/100
Silent Hill: Downpour	(X360) 68/100 (PS3) 64/100
Silent Hill HD Collection	(PS3) 70/100 (X360) 69/100
Silent Hill: Book of Memories	(Vita) 58/100
Silent Hill: The Short Message	(PS5) 52/100
Silent Hill 2 (remake)	(PC) 87/100 (PS5) 86/100 (XSXS) 86/100
Silent Hill f	(PS5) 86/100 (PC) 85/100 (XSXS) 82/100
Silent Hill: Townfall	(PC) 80/100 (PS5) 79/100

The Silent Hill franchise has been generally positive reviews and praised for its graphics, atmosphere, and narrative. While the first three installments received critical acclaim, and the fourth game received general praise from critics, later games in the series were less well received.

The first installment in the series, Silent Hill, received a positive response from critics upon its release and was commercially successful. It is considered a defining title in the survival horror genre, moving away from B movie horror elements toward a psychological style of horror that emphasizes atmosphere.

Silent Hill 2 received critical acclaim. It was named the fourteenth-best game on the PS2 by IGN, which noted that "it preserved most of the original game's what-might-be-out-there fear, but with major advances to the graphics and sound, the game was able to deliver a far more immersive, frightful, and compelling storyline". Silent Hill 2 is considered one of the best horror games of all time by many, as it features on several "best games ever" lists by critics.

Praise for Silent Hill 2 was particularly aimed at its dark, cerebral narrative and storytelling, its exploration and handling of mature themes and concepts such as mental illness and domestic abuse, its sound design and musical composition, and its atmospheric and frightening tone and direction. Additionally, the fear-inducing and tense gameplay, along with the graphics and the symbolic nature of the monster designs, contributed to its acclaim. Silent Hill 2 is widely considered to be the best installment in the Silent Hill series and is regarded by many as a masterpiece of the horror game genre.

Silent Hill 3 was well received by critics, especially for its presentation, including its environments, graphics, and audio, as well as the overall horror elements and themes continued from past installments. The game received praise for its story, which was a continuation of the first game's narrative.

In comparison to the previous three installments, Silent Hill 4: The Room received mostly positive reviews, though its reception was lower than that of its predecessors. Many reviewers disliked the increased emphasis on combat, which lessened the focus on the horror aspect of gameplay. However, the game was praised for its atmospheric tone and direction, sound design, graphics, and storyline. The changes from the series' conventions received mixed responses, varying from positive to negative. 1UP.com stated that Konami went "backwards" with this game, though reviews, such as GameSpot's, still praised the game's atmosphere.

Origins received positive reviews despite some criticism. It was praised for returning to the old gameplay formula—according to IGN, Origins does justice to the series as a whole. However, some critics pointed out the series' increasing predictability, with GameSpot stating that "this old fog needs to learn some new tricks".

Homecoming received mixed reviews. It was praised for its graphics and audio, but the horror and gameplay received mixed reactions. Some critics, such as GameSpot, felt that it lost "the psychological horror factor that the series is so well-known for". Some critics were harsher; IGN called the game a "letdown".

Shattered Memories received more positive reviews. GameSpot praised the game's effort at reinventing the first game's plot, rather than being a simple remake.

Downpour received mixed reviews. While certain critics praised the soundtrack and story elements, the game was criticized for "sluggish combat" and "occasional freezes".

HD Collection also received mixed reviews. Critics criticized the collection for many technical issues plaguing both games and the artistic changes made to the games. Book of Memories, while receiving mixed reviews, has been the least well-received game in the series, with most criticism regarding the game's shift in genre.

The Duffer Brothers have cited Silent Hill as an influence on their 2016 television show Stranger Things. They noted that it inspired the Upside Down, a parallel dimension in the series.

== Other media ==
=== Print ===
Print media of the Silent Hill franchise includes a series of comic book adaptations; the novels Silent Hill, Silent Hill 2, and Silent Hill 3 by Sadamu Yamashita, which are novelizations of their eponymous video games; the guidebook Lost Memories; and the art book Drawing Block: Silent Hill 3 Program.

=== Video games ===
Spin-off video games based on the series include the arcade game Silent Hill: The Arcade and the mobile games Silent Hill: Orphan and Silent Hill: The Escape.

Konami has announced Silent Hill-themed pachislot machines, one in 2015 and another two titled Silent Hill: Return and Silent Hill: Escape in 2019.

Downloadable content for the video games Dead by Daylight and Dark Deception: Monsters & Mortals was released in June 2020 and March 2021, respectively.

=== Film series ===
A film adaptation of the first game in the series, titled Silent Hill, was released in 2006. It was adapted and directed by French film director, producer, and writer Christophe Gans, who is a big fan of the Silent Hill game series.

A second film, titled Silent Hill: Revelation, written and directed by M. J. Bassett and based on Silent Hill 3, was released in 2012.

A third film, titled Return to Silent Hill, directed and co-written by Gans, and based on Silent Hill 2, served as a reboot of the film series. It was released in January 2026.

On September 20, 2026, The Wall Street Journal revealed that Roy Lee, who produced Zach Cregger's Resident Evil (2026), is developing a Silent Hill reboot movie he'll be producing.

=== Television ===
Silent Hill: Ascension was a CGI interactive television series developed by Genvid Technologies, Bad Robot Games, and Behaviour Interactive. It was a Choose Your Own Adventure-style series, and after each episode, viewers could vote on the direction of the story in real time, giving them agency in how the singular canon progresses, similar to other horror contemporaries such as Black Mirror: Bandersnatch and the 2020 continuation of Ben Drowned. The first episode was broadcast on October 31, 2023, serving as the "series premiere" of the interactive series. The series was broadcast daily at 9:00 PM ET/6:00 PM PT for "the next several months," with the last episode airing on April 24, 2024. The title won an Emmy for Outstanding Innovation in Emerging Media Programming in 2024. PC and mobile viewers had access to various accompany mini-games and puzzles that helped players build up "Influence Points" for voting on the story's direction. One such mini-game was a rhythm based game where players could follow along beats of prior Silent Hill games' soundtracks.

=== Multimedia experiences ===
Two DVDs, The Art of Silent Hill and Lost Memories: The Art and Music of Silent Hill, were released to the region 2 market. The first featured behind the scenes content about the first two games, while the later expanded to the first three. A PlayStation Portable title, The Silent Hill Experience, was released in 2006, featuring behind the scenes content based on the first four games and the first movie, as well as including digital comics.

== In popular culture ==
- The Axis of Perdition, an industrial black metal band, recorded Physical Illucinations in the Sewer of Xuchilbara (The Red God), a 2004 EP named after a god from the Silent Hill franchise. The EP also states that it was recorded "in the confines of Toluca Prison," a location from Silent Hill 2. The track titles and tracks themselves refer to Silent Hill and feature music and voice samples, most notably of Claudia Wolf, the main antagonist of Silent Hill 3.
- Dementium: The Ward, a survival horror game for the Nintendo DS, was originally pitched as a Silent Hill game, but it was turned down by Konami. Dementium II, also a survival horror game for the Nintendo DS, was similarly pitched as a Silent Hill game but was rejected by Konami.
- The Dark Pictures, an anthology series of interactive drama and survival horror video games developed and published by Supermassive Games, was originally pitched as episodic Silent Hill games, but Konami ultimately turned them down in favor of collaborating with Annapurna Interactive.
- The "Upside Down", a location in the Netflix 2016 horror TV series Stranger Things, is inspired by Silent Hill's Otherworld.
- Tetsuya Yamagami, the perpetrator behind the assassination of Shinzo Abe, owned a Twitter account with the screen name "silent hill 333", in reference to the series, prior to the events of the assassination.
- Pyramid Head appears in the episode "Curse of the Green Halloween Witch" of the American adult animated TV series Smiling Friends, first aired in 2025, in an officially licensed appearance by Konami.
- A major collaboration campaign with Kodansha's hit manga Attack on Titan during the 2026 Tokyo Game Show event, following the incoming releases of Silent Hill: Townfall and Roverton chapters.
