= Silent Hill: Homecoming =

2008 video game

- North American cover art
- Developer: Double Helix Games
- Publisher: Konami
- Director: Cordy Rierson
- Producers: Jeremy Lee; William Oertel
- Designer: Jason Allen
- Programmer: Kevin Christensen
- Artist: Brian Horton
- Writers: Patrick J. Doody; Chris Valenziano
- Composer: Akira Yamaoka
- Series: Silent Hill
- Platforms: PlayStation 3; Xbox 360; Windows
- Release: PlayStation 3, Xbox 360: NA: September 30, 2008; EU: February 27, 2009; Windows: NA: November 6, 2008; EU: February 27, 2009
- Genre: Survival horror
- Mode: Single-player

Silent Hill: Homecoming is a 2008 survival horror game developed by Double Helix Games and published by Konami. The sixth installment in the Silent Hill series, Homecoming follows the journey of Alex Shepherd, a soldier returning from war, to his hometown of Shepherd's Glen, where he finds the town in disarray, and his younger brother missing. As he continues on his search to find his younger brother, he discovers more about the Order, the town's history and his own past.

The game was released on September 30, 2008, in North America for the PlayStation 3 and Xbox 360, and the Windows version was released in North America on November 6, 2008, exclusively through Valve's Steam digital content delivery service. Versions were simultaneously released in Europe, including a retail Windows version, on February 27, 2009. The Japanese release was cancelled. On July 25, 2018, the game alongside Silent Hill HD Collection became backward compatible on Xbox One.

== Gameplay ==
Alex attacking a monster with a dagger; a health meter is visible.

The player assumes the role of Alex Shepherd, a Special Forces soldier who returns home from an overseas tour of duty to find that his father and younger brother are missing, and that his mother has gone into catatonia. Alex begins to search for his brother, leading him to Silent Hill after searching his hometown of Shepherd's Glen.

Overall gameplay is similar to past entries in the series. The player, as Alex, explores the various environments and locales, searching for clues to advance the plot, such as photographs, drawings and other items which are placed inside Alex's journal, which the player may read at any time. To assist the player, Alex will turn his head towards items and clues to inform the player that the object may be picked up; other recurring items include weapons and ammunition, which give off a glow as a visual cue to the player, and health drinks. Puzzle elements also play a part in the game, and Alex's journal may refer to photographs and other items that can help the player decipher such puzzles as keypad entries. For the first time in the series, the player may select responses when engaging in dialogue with other characters encountered in the game, which in turn may affect how the player sees the plot unfold.

In addition to exploration, combat is another major element to the gameplay, and the player must fight the various monsters that appear. In contrast to the more naïve everyman protagonists of previous games, combat in Homecoming takes into account Alex's experience as a soldier. The player is able to perform light and heavy attacks, or mix them to perform combinations, and may also perform a variety of finishing moves to ensure that the monsters are dead, a gameplay mechanic first featured in a rudimentary form in Silent Hill: Origins. Attacking enemies also leaves wounds in them that match the motion carried out by Alex in inflicting the attack. In terms of controlling Alex, the player may also perform new maneuvers such as targeting the enemy before attacking them, dodging enemy attacks, and performing counter-attacks. As well as melee weapons, pistols, rifles and shotguns are available as firearms, which can be upgraded to stronger versions later in the game: firearm handling is also rendered in a more realistic manner, with Alex having to shoulder long guns and suffering aim effects like recoil. In addition to the changes in combat, and unlike previous entries in the series, the player is also able to fully control and rotate the camera as they choose; one analog stick controls player movement, and the other controls the camera.

== Plot ==
At the start of the game, the player controls Alex through a nightmare concerning his younger brother, Josh, before Alex wakes up in the cab of a truck driven by Travis Grady (the protagonist of Silent Hill: Origins) who gives him a ride to his hometown of Shepherd's Glen. The town, named for a distant ancestor who helped found it, is covered in fog and deserted. At home, he finds his mother in a catatonic state, murmuring about his father leaving to find Josh; promising to find Josh, Alex leaves.

Alex soon discovers that many more people have gone missing in Shepherd's Glen since he left, when he finds his childhood friend Elle Holloway pinning "missing" signs to a board outside the police department. As Alex explores the town, he witnesses the separate deaths of Mayor Bartlett and Dr. Fitch by monsters in the Otherworld, both of whom have a child who is missing. Back in Shepherd's Glen, Alex allies himself with Deputy Wheeler in the police department. Alex eventually learns that his father was involved in the secrets of the town and had left to attempt to resolve the town's problems, but before Alex is able to get answers from his mother at home, he is knocked unconscious as The Order—a religious cult from Silent Hill which has been taking people from the town— kidnaps his mother.

Alex, Elle, and Wheeler take a boat across Toluca Lake to find Alex's father in Silent Hill but are intercepted by the Order. Elle and Wheeler are taken to Silent Hill's penitentiary, where Alex attempts to rescue them. He finds his mother bound; the player must make a decision regarding whether to kill her out of mercy or not, which will affect the outcome of the game. After rescuing Elle's mother, Judge Holloway, and separating from Wheeler once more, Alex finds the Order's church, where he secretly listens to his father in the confessional; the player may choose to forgive him, again affecting the outcome of the game. Alex later runs into his father, who reveals that Alex was never a soldier and has been in a mental hospital since "the accident" occurred. He begs forgiveness before he is killed by a monster called the Bogeyman (resembling Pyramid Head from Silent Hill 2).

Continuing to the Order's underground base, Alex is captured by Judge Holloway, who reveals that everything that has happened is due to a broken pact. 150 years ago, the four founding families broke away from Silent Hill's Order to move to Shepherd's Glen. They were allowed to do so on the condition that once every 50 years they would sacrifice one of their children in a preordained fashion: however, on this occasion, while Joey Bartlett, Scarlett Fitch, and Nora Holloway—whose monstrous spirit manifestations Alex has encountered as the boss monsters of the game—were successfully sacrificed by their parents, the Shepherd sacrifice failed, and as a result, the Order had been reformed to try to appease their god. Judge Holloway tries to kill Alex, who kills her in self-defense. Alex rescues Elle from the facility and, after finding Wheeler injured and allowing the player to choose whether or not to save him—once more affecting the outcome of the game—continues on alone to find Josh.

Realizing he was the intended sacrifice, Alex experiences a flashback showing Josh's true fate. When Alex was younger, he had taken Josh rowing out on the lake, where Josh showed Alex a ring, which his father had chosen to give to him instead of Alex. Out of jealousy, Alex struggled with Josh to try to take the ring, and as they fought Josh accidentally fell into the lake and drowned. His father retrieved the body and explained that Alex had "ruined it for all of us", since he had chosen Alex, and not Josh; unable to accept Josh's death, Alex was then sent to the mental hospital (and not enlisting in the military as he initially believed), and with Josh instead of Alex sacrificed, the Order's pact was broken. After fighting the final boss, the manifestation of Josh's spirit, Alex finally has the chance to apologize and states that he never wanted Josh's death. Alex leaves the family ring and his father's angle-head army flashlight on Josh's body and exits the chamber.

There are five endings available, which depend on the player's actions during the game, including whether the player kills Alex's mother, forgives Alex's father, and saves Deputy Wheeler. These range from the single positive ending to the game—where Alex comes to terms with his past actions and reunites with Elle to leave Shepherd's Glen—to three other endings: Alex getting drowned by his father, waking up in the hospital and receiving a shock treatment, or being turned into a Bogeyman. There is also a joke ending, where both Alex and Elle are abducted by a UFO while Wheeler witnesses. In addition to these endings, if the player collects all of Josh's pictures or clears the game on the "hard" difficulty, a first-person post-credits scene is played where Alex finds a dripping wet Josh sitting on the bottom bunk of his bed, who uses a camera to take a picture of Alex that he can find in-game.

== Development ==
The Otherworld begins to appear as paint falls from the walls and the ceiling light drops down.

Chief designer of Silent Hill 4: The Room, Masashi Tsuboyama of Team Silent, has confirmed that they are creating the next game on August 17, 2004 in an interview with Eurogamer, in which he also debunked previous internet rumors that it was to be called Shadows. No information was initially imparted about the platform the game would appear on, other than it would be appearing on the next generation of consoles, which had yet to be released. Akihiro Imamura of Team Silent and Akira Yamaoka of Team Silent has revealed more information on April 23, 2005 in an interview with Game World, in which they discussed that their needs as creators have taken a back seat since Silent Hill 3 and they planned to change that with the next game. They also said that after the underwhelming response Silent Hill 4: The Room received, they have been gathering opinions from everywhere to make sure they come back strong with the next installment. In September 2006 at Tokyo Game Show 2006, Play Magazine interviewed Konami US producer, William Oertel who confirmed that Team Silent is still working on the project. Composer of Silent Hill 5, Akira Yamaoka of Team Silent has revealed more information in a December 2006 interview with Famitsu, in which he confirmed that Team Silent is still working on the project and he just began composing the game's music. In the same interview; he hinted that they had hoped to carry on "plans of the earlier Silent Hill platforms", and that the team were creating a title with the idea of "fear in daylight", with similar psychological roots to Silent Hill 2. He also reaffirmed in an April 2007 interview with GamePro, that the story and gameplay would be more like that of the second entry in the series in the way the player is directed, and in the character's behavior, along with the idea of creating the game for the PlayStation 3 and Xbox 360 platforms. Chief director of Silent Hill 5, Masashi Tsuboyama of Team Silent, has revealed more information in a May 2007 interview with Dengeki PlayStation, in which he said that they have been assessing the next generation of consoles such as Sony's PlayStation 3. They have looked at other consoles too, but they exact limitations which could delay progress. They have not decided yet which console the game would be on.

However, most of the ideas previously hinted at were not found in subsequent information releases. On July 11, 2007 at E3 2007, a new teaser trailer was displayed by Konami that revealed the title of the game to be Silent Hill V, and that the game would be released for PlayStation 3 and Xbox 360. Further to this trailer, Konami executives also revealed that the developer would not in fact be Team Silent as in previous iterations, but that, like Silent Hill: Origins, it would be developed by a Western developer, The Collective. According to Kenzie LaMar, lead character artist of Silent Hill: Homecoming, Team Silent was developing the cancelled Silent Hill 5, when they were ultimately disbanded by Konami itself, because Konami wanted other developers to make the games and wanted the games to be different. The studio had been working since the end of 2006 on the production of Harker, another survival horror title which was slated for 2008, but this was placed on indefinite hiatus during the game's production. At the time, the game was expected to be released in the United States in January 2008, with a UK release yet to be announced. The Collective was merged with Shiny Entertainment into one studio by their parent company, Foundation 9 Entertainment on October 9, 2007. The studio, led by Michael Persson, received the name Double Helix Games, from the parent company on March 27, 2008. On April 21, 2008, Konami announced that Silent Hill V has been renamed to Silent Hill: Homecoming.

Double Helix drew inspiration not only from past installments in the game series but also from the first Silent Hill movie adaptation; this is most evident in the transition from the normal world to the Otherworld, whose "ripping" effect almost matches that found in the movie. Other similarities from the same source includes the reaction of nurses to light, the bug-like creatures seen in the movie, and the Pyramid Head rendition, known as the "Bogeyman" in this game. Homages to previous games in the series include a reference to the long-running joke of the lead character placing their hand in a toilet bowl to retrieve items. Lead designer Jason Allen described the intentions of the development team to be to maintain the depth of storytelling and atmosphere of the series whilst making combat more intuitive and less frustrating. The script, in-game journal entries, and instruction manual were written by Patrick J. Doody and Chris Valenziano, based on the story and the summary of events provided by lead designer Jason Allen, lead artist Brian Horton, and lead level designer Daniel Jacobs.

On September 10, 2009, it was reported that the game will not see an official release throughout Japan. According to statements from Konami, it was due to marketing reasons that the company decided not to promote the game.

=== Music ===
Despite the change in development team, Akira Yamaoka returned from past installments in the series to create both music and sound effects for the game. It was the first game in the series to use surround sound. Yamaoka wrote 70 minutes of music for the game, and insisted on working with Mary Elizabeth McGlynn to provide vocals, as fan reaction to her voice on previous Silent Hill titles has been favorable. Homecoming's soundtrack was released on November 24, 2008. McGlynn provided vocals for four tracks.

=== Censorship ===
Homecoming had difficulties in passing censors in some countries before it could go on sale. The Australian classification board, the Office of Film and Literature Classification (OFLC), refused to classify the game, due to "impact violence and excessive blood effects". The objectionable scenes included various body parts being drilled into, as well as the bisection of a character by an enemy. This had the effect of banning the game for sale in the country, and representatives for publisher Atari mentioned that they would be asking Konami to tone down the violence to allow the game to receive the needed MA15+ rating for its sale to be permitted in early 2009.

The German version of the game was also postponed to 2009 for cuts to be made to pass the German censors after the uncensored version was rejected by the Unterhaltungssoftware Selbstkontrolle. The game was re-submitted after being altered in the same way as the Australian version and received the rating keine Jugendfreigabe (meaning 18+).

On November 19, 2010, the Amtsgericht Frankfurt am Main confiscated all Xbox 360 versions imported from the UK (thus being uncensored) for violation of § 131 StGB (representation of violence), effectively banning it from sale within Germany.

== Release and sales ==
Homecoming was released in North America on September 30, 2008, for both PlayStation 3 and Xbox 360 consoles. In North America, Central America and South America, the PC version is only available via the Steam content delivery network. It was intended to launch on the same date as the console versions, but was delayed, finally becoming available on Steam on November 6, 2008. A European release on all platforms was intended for the same month, but was delayed to February 2009. In contrast to the American regions, a PC retail release on DVD was made available in Europe. Official statements by Konami referred to sales of the game in Europe as "brisk".

== Reception ==
Reception

Aggregate score
Aggregator	Score
Metacritic	(PS3) 71/100 (X360) 70/100 (PC) 64/100

Review scores
Publication	Score
1Up.com	B
Game Informer	6.5/10
GamePro	3/5
GameRevolution	B
GameSpy	3.5/5
IGN	5.5/10
Official Xbox Magazine (US)	6.5/10
TeamXbox	8.4/10
X-Play	4/5

Homecoming's average at Metacritic is 71 out of 100 for the PS3 version, 70 out of 100 for the Xbox 360 version and 64 out of 100 for the PC version. As the second external developer working on a Silent Hill entry, and the first for a home console iteration, Double Helix were under scrutiny from reviewers and Silent Hill fans to see how a Western developer would handle the franchise; many reviewers found the change in developer to be a positive move overall, while some, acknowledging faults in the final product, expressed interest in seeing further Silent Hill games from the same developer. In contrast, Zero Punctuation commented that the game was as an example of Japanese franchises being downgraded by Westernization, particularly in the different approaches taken to induce fear in the player.

Praise was given to the graphics and environments, described as "fantastic", with Shepherd's Glen in particular being "rendered brilliantly", and "the upgraded visuals bestow a filmic quality to everything and the world's eerie transformations look better than ever". Surprise was expressed at the darkness of the game, with the flashlight seemingly having less effect than in previous games, and making some markers, such as doors, hard to spot.

The music, written by series regular Akira Yamaoka, and the ambient audio, were received well, being "atmospheric, moody and beautifully presented"; the audio goes "a long way toward establishing the expected Silent Hill mood", though some concern was expressed that the music was "somewhat misplaced" and did not fit in so well. Voice acting, which has traditionally been seen as one of the series' weaker points, was evaluated as better than the series' usual attempts, but occasionally "flat" when more emotion was needed.

The game's plot received a largely mixed reception. While some reviewers graded it positively, describing it as "intriguing and disturbing", it was also noted that it "isn't particularly original, and there are no great surprises", even though it "still makes for a very involving journey into the macabre". Several reviewers likened the story to a subplot of the main Silent Hill mythos which, while able to "stand on its own", "barely mentions certain characters which fairly dominate the backstory of previous SH games". Some critics expressed disappointment at the predictability of the main twist in the story regarding Alex's predicament, while others found it "genuinely shocking". Croshaw's Zero Punctuation review was generally negative, stating that while the level design, story and combat were all competent, the game had little to do with what he liked about the Silent Hill series and would have been better served as a completely different franchise.
