= Silent Hill: Orphan =

2007 video game

- Cover of the third release
- Developer: Gamefederation Studio
- Publisher: Konami Digital Entertainment
- Director: Eirik Moseng
- Producers: Matte Brus; Axel de Rougé
- Designer: Pelle von Koch
- Programmer: Evgeniy Seryshev
- Artist: Anders Korodi
- Series: Silent Hill
- Platform: Java ME
- Release: EU: November 2007; JP: December 2007; NA: October 2008
- Genres: Survival horror, point-and-click adventure
- Mode: Single player

Silent Hill: Orphan (known as Silent Hill Mobile in Europe) is a 2007 survival horror game developed by Gamefederation Studio and published by Konami Digital Entertainment. The game is set in an abandoned orphanage and is played through first-person, point-and-click gameplay. In order for the player to survive, a string of puzzles must be solved by using various items and clues. Orphan also unveils a new perspective on some past events that have occurred in the town. The sequel, Orphan 2, was released in September 2008, and the Orphan 3 in March 2010.

== Synopsis ==
Orphan takes place within the walls of an abandoned orphanage in the fog-shrouded town. The game begins with the player controlling Ben, who was one of the few children that survived the events of one mysterious night, thirty years ago, when almost every child and caregiver died. Ben returns to the Sheppard's Orphanage to find out what really happened on that night. As he explores the orphanage, he hears the cries of another person, Karen, through a ventilation duct, and he offers to find and release her as she can't remember how she got there. Soon, he finds a strange red symbol in a disused bathroom that transforms the orphanage into a grotesque, bloody Otherworld version infested with monsters. After solving cryptic puzzles, he discovers he was diagnosed with cancer as a child, and when he returns to the shower room (his safe haven as a child) he is attacked by an unseen force.

Then the game switches over to Moon, another orphan that survived the massacre. She discovers Ben's corpse in the shower room and is told to commit suicide by the same strange force that Ben encountered (Moon had tried suicide in the past and her parents, tired of her desperate attempts, brought her to the orphanage). After further exploring, she obtains some scissors and the voice tells her to use them. Instead she uses them to solve a puzzle, after which she discovers a suicide letter from herself to her parents, which Moon apparently never wrote. When Moon enters the place suggested by the letter, she encounters the voice again and is attacked by an unseen force.

The game switches to Karen, who is locked in a storeroom with no means of escape. She hears a voice through the ventilation duct (Ben) who offers to help her. She then rests and then falls asleep. When she wakes up, the door is open and she finds a corpse in the nearby shower room. As Karen explores, she regains fragments of her memory from the voice; Karen happens to be the sister of Alessa, who is in fact the strange voice. After obtaining a drawing and solving a puzzle, Karen gains entry to a room in the Otherworld where she encounters Alessa, who helps her regain her full memory. It is revealed that Alessa wanted revenge for being put in the orphanage and manipulated her sister, Karen, into murdering all the people in the orphanage. Karen did so and grew up not knowing the truth. Karen tells Alessa that she didn't want to kill and that Alessa was the one who wanted revenge. Alessa then thinks Karen is turning on her and unleashes a monster. After Karen kills it, Alessa tells her to "Visit Moon. She's waiting..."

The game is divided into three chapters, one for each character, which interlock each other shedding some light on the events that took place thirty years before.

== Release format ==
Both Silent Hill: Orphan and Silent Hill: Orphan 2 and 3 were released in the standard .jar Java format, compatible with phones which support such feature.

== American release ==
The American release underwent both technical and aesthetic changes. Monsters, instead of resembling a four-legged spider, are strange mounds of flesh on the ceiling. Areas are also lit well enough that they no longer require the lighter to illuminate them. There were also several more minor differences.
