= Silent Hill: The Escape =

2007 video game

- Developer: Konami Digital Entertainment
- Publisher: Konami Digital Entertainment
- Director: Tatsuma Minami
- Producer: Norio Nakayama
- Programmers: Tahei Katagai; Takuji Terada
- Artist: Takamitsu Kinjo
- Composer: Akira Yamaoka
- Series: Silent Hill
- Platforms: FOMA, iOS, Android
- Release: JP: December 19, 2007 (FOMA); JP: December 17, 2008 (iPhone, iPod Touch); NA: December 23, 2008 (iPhone, iPod Touch); WW: January 22, 2009 (iPhone); KR: 2010 (Android)
- Genre: First-person shooter

Silent Hill: The Escape is a 2007 first-person shooter game developed and published by Konami Digital Entertainment for mobile phones.

The game objective is for the player to make their way through ten levels by finding the key and opening the locked door at the end of each level. The player must slide their fingers to move the character in a first person perspective and tap the screen to shoot enemies. The player can tilt the device to change the camera perspective. This is also used while reloading the player's revolver, as you must align it correctly in order to reload.

== Gameplay ==
In Silent Hill: The Escape, players encounter enemies while explore environments.

Silent Hill: The Escape is a first-person dungeon crawler where the player must navigate through levels to find a key, and then escape. Enemies can be avoided by listening out for radio static, or looking at a danger icon at the top of the screen. As the player explores, they can find battery packs to recharge the flashlight.

In enemy encounters, the player can aim a gun by tilting their device to aim at specific parts of the enemy, and tap to fire. Reloading is done by tilting the device to line up bullets with the gun's chamber, then tapping the screen. If done incorrectly, the gun will only reload three bullets instead of six.

== Characters ==
There are three playable characters, with each unlocked after beating the game with the previous character.

- Human: an unidentified person who does not remember how they got there, the human is seen with a neutral facial expression and is usually a male.
- Alien: a grey alien investigating the cause of the abnormalities in the town of Silent Hill.
- Mira: the Shiba Inu, a reference to the recurring joke endings of the franchise.

Robbie the Rabbit: Only appears in the tutorial level of the game.

=== Enemies ===
The game features a variety of enemies, including Bubble-Head Nurses, wheelchair-using ghosts, and insects, as well as powerful hooded monsters that resemble recurring villain and series mascot Pyramid Head.

== Reception ==
Reception

Review scores
Publication	Score
Destructoid	6/10
IGN	5.3/10
Pocket Gamer	4/5

Colette Bennett at Destructoid said the game would appeal to fans of the franchise, but was "a very simple experience." Levi Buchanan for IGN was more critical, saying the game was "slow and frustrating, which works against its otherwise effective atmosphere."
