= Silent Hill: Origins =

2007 video game

- European cover art
- Developer: Climax Studios
- Publisher: Konami
- Director: Mark Simmons
- Producer: William Oertel
- Designer: Sam Barlow
- Programmer: Dave Owens
- Artist: Neale Williams
- Writer: Sam Barlow
- Composer: Akira Yamaoka
- Series: Silent Hill
- Platforms: PlayStation Portable; PlayStation 2
- Release: PlayStation Portable: NA: 6 November 2007; EU: 16 November 2007; AU: 30 November 2007; JP: 6 December 2007; PlayStation 2: NA: 4 March 2008; EU: 16 May 2008; AU: 23 May 2008
- Genre: Survival horror
- Mode: Single-player

Silent Hill: Origins (stylized as Silent Hill: 0rigins) (Note: Known in Japan as Silent Hill Zero (Japanese: サイレントヒル ゼロ, Hepburn: Sairento Hiru Zero)) is a 2007 survival horror game developed by Climax Studios and published by Konami. It was released worldwide in late 2007 for the PlayStation Portable, beginning in early November with the United Kingdom. A port for the PlayStation 2 was released worldwide in early 2008, beginning in March with North America. The fifth installment in the Silent Hill series, Origins is a prequel to the first game (1999). Set in the series' eponymous, fictional American town, Origins follows trucker Travis Grady as he searches for information about a girl whom he rescued from a fire. Along the way, he unlocks his repressed childhood memories. Gameplay uses a third-person perspective, and emphasizes combat, exploration, and puzzle-solving, similar to the previous installments.

Silent Hill: Origins was originally being developed by Climax LA, an American development studio based in Santa Monica. The game's development was transferred to Climax Action, a British development studio based in Portsmouth, because the original studio suffered from significant layoffs, and facing issues with the game engine and the vision of the game; the script, monsters, and level design were redone, and aspects of Origins' atmosphere and gameplay intentionally replicated those of the first Silent Hill game. Origins was generally positively reviewed, although some reviewers wrote that it followed the formula of the series too closely and failed to add anything new. Its PlayStation 2 port received a lower aggregate score, with criticism directed towards its visuals.

== Gameplay ==
Player character Travis Grady stands near one of the mirrors used to transport him to and from the Otherworld.

The objective of Silent Hill: Origins is to guide player character, Travis Grady, as he searches the monster-filled town of Silent Hill for information about a girl he rescued from a burning house. The game uses a third-person perspective which it alternates with fixed camera angles. Following the gameplay formula of previous Silent Hill games, Origins primarily revolves around combat, exploration, and puzzle-solving. Typical gameplay of Origins consists of alternating between reality and its darker and dilapidated counterpart, the "Other World", to obtain keys and objects needed to solve a riddle. Travis carries a flashlight and indicates the direction of a nearby usable item, while his portable radio alerts the player to the presence of nearby monsters by emitting static. Often, actions performed in one dimension will affect the other; for example, raising a prop on the stage in the theater results in a similar reaction in the Other World. Once solved, the riddle leads to an encounter with a boss, whose defeat unlocks a new area. Completion of the game results in unlocking special items or alternative outfits for Travis depending on various accomplishments.

For combat, in addition to using his fists (marking the first time unarmed combat is possible in a Silent Hill game), Travis accumulates a range of weapons throughout the town: firearms, melee weapons, and one-shot items usable in close combat; the latter two are breakable. Although one-shot items can be used to quickly kill some of the monsters encountered early on, Travis is vulnerable while performing this action to damage from quick enemies or those with long-ranged attacks. Origins also introduces the "grapple" system, a quick time event activated when a monster grabs him. Should he escape, no damage is done to either him or the monster. The status of his "health" is indicated in the inventory, since the game does not feature a heads-up display; however, when his health is critical, the edges of the screen throb red, and his heartbeat is heard.

== Synopsis ==
=== Setting and characters ===
A prequel to the first Silent Hill installment, Silent Hill: Origins takes place several years before the events of the first game. Origins is set in the eponymous, foggy, and rural small town located in the northeastern United States. The town is characterized by the "Other World", a supernatural location periodically encountered by the protagonists of the series. Most frequently assuming the form of the town, the Other World causes the characters to experience delusions and various symbols from their unconscious.

Origins introduces Travis Grady, a trucker with a troubled past who suffers from nightmares. Returning characters from the first installment are Alessa Gilespie, a young girl who possesses supernatural powers; licensed practical nurse Lisa Garland, who has a drug addiction and dreams of being an actress instead of a nurse; physician Michael Kaufmann, who supplies Lisa with illegal drugs; and Alessa's mother, Dahlia Gillespie, a member of the town's cult which plans to bring its malevolent god into this world.

=== Plot ===
Driving past Silent Hill as a shortcut, Travis swerves his truck to avoid hitting a spirit manifestation of Alessa. While following the spirit manifestation, he stumbles upon a burning house and rescues the real Alessa, who was immolated in a ritual to impregnate her with the cult's god. Losing consciousness outside the house, he awakens in the town and resolves to learn if she survived. During his journey, Travis unlocks his repressed childhood memories and defeats monstrous forms of his parents: his mother had been committed to a local mental institution after attempting to kill him, and his father had killed himself, unable to live with the guilt of having his wife condemned. Additionally, Travis kills the Butcher, a monster that has been slaughtering other monsters.

Travis continues following Alessa's spirit manifestation, which refuses to speak to him, and gradually collects pieces of an unknown pyramid-shaped object; after collecting all of the pieces, he assembles them to form the Flauros, an artifact which contains a trapped demon and can be used to amplify thought. Alessa's spirit manifestation uses the completed Flauros to increase her powers and free herself from Dahlia's spell, which had inhibited her abilities. Dahlia reveals that the cult plans to use Alessa to give birth to its god, before leaving to take part in the ritual. Travis heads to the cult's ritual grounds, and sees members of the cult, including Kaufmann, surrounding Alessa's burned body. Incapacitated by Kaufmann, Travis defeats and imprisons the demon within the Flauros in a dream-like state.

There are three endings available, with less dependence on the player's actions during the game than in other installments of the series. In the "Good" ending, Alessa uses the Flauros to manifest a baby with half of her soul, stopping the ritual, and her spirit manifestation carries the baby to the outskirts of the town, seeing Travis off as he returns to his truck and cheerfully drives away from Silent Hill. Dialogue follows to reveal that the protagonist of the first game, Harry Mason, and his wife find and adopt the baby, naming her Cheryl, while Dahlia and Kaufmann plan to cast a spell to draw the other half of Alessa's soul back to the town, setting the events of the first Silent Hill game in motion. In the "Bad" ending, Travis awakens strapped to a gurney and is injected with an unknown substance: he starts convulsing and has a series of visions in which he kills two people and his form is briefly replaced by that of the Butcher. The joke ending sees Travis leave in a UFO with an alien and a dog in order to search for his now-missing truck.

== Development ==
Screenshot from the original gameplay preview. The creature pictured was also later scrapped after the project went to Climax Action.

On May 9, 2006 at E3 2006, Konami announced that Climax LA was working on the next entry in the popular Silent Hill franchise of horror games, instead of Team Silent, because they were working on their own project. It was titled Silent Hill: Origins and exclusively announced for the PlayStation Portable. The game was supposed to be a remake of the first Silent Hill, but when they looked at how much work that would be -- redoing all the graphics from scratch -- they decided to do something that updated the history of the series rather than repeating it. The first previews of the game featured a departure from the third-person view typical of the series to a Resident Evil 4-style camera angle, and an emphasis on action and combat to a greater degree than the previous installments in the series. In the previews, Travis had six weapons, divided equally between melee weapons and firearms. Additional changes included a laser sight for his pistol and an option for the player to barricade areas. At the time, the game was expected to be released in late 2006.

The studio incurred a significant reduction in head count by 14 people in October 2006, a move that reportedly resulted in that the development of Silent Hill: Origins to be moved to Climax Action in the UK, alongside issues with the game's engine and "a confused high-level vision for the game". The release date was pushed back from late 2006 to late 2007. Climax LA has closed down its development operations in Santa Monica for unspecified reasons and it was turned into the US division for business development on February 23, 2007. Konami allowed the team to change the game, provided that the changes were done within the same budget and time frame; Origins's script, level design, and monsters were redone within a week by Sam Barlow. The game was developed in 6 months with half of the game's budget remaining, because the original developer already spent the another half. For Origins, the developers intentionally replicated aspects of gameplay and atmosphere from the first installment; for example, the monsters behave more aggressively than those in previous installments, as a throwback to the first game. Later previews showed that the game had changed significantly and contained gameplay more in line with that found in the previous titles in the series. The changes were well received by video game journalists. On 19 August 2007, a demo of the game was leaked to internet download sites; Climax promptly denied they were the source of the leaked content.

Origins was released for the PlayStation Portable (PSP) on 6 November 2007 in North America, on 16 November in Europe, on 29 November in Australia, and on 6 December in Japan. The Japanese release carried the alternate title Silent Hill Zero. On 22 January 2008, Konami officially confirmed that a PlayStation 2 (PS2) port was in development. The PS2 port was released in North America on 5 March 2008, while the United Kingdom and Australian releases followed on 16 May 2008, and 23 May 2008, respectively. It became available on the PlayStation Network for Europe on 28 April 2014.

=== Music ===
Released as Silent Hill Zero Original Soundtracks, the musical score of Origins was composed by Akira Yamaoka, who had created the music of previous games in the series, and released in Japan on 25 January 2008, by Konami Music Entertainment, Inc. As Origins is a prequel, Yamaoka wished to imbue its music with the atmosphere of the first installment. Mary Elizabeth McGlynn provided vocals for four tracks, for which Joe Romersa wrote the lyrics. All three had previously worked together on the music of the fourth installment of the series (2004).

== Reception ==
Reception

Aggregate score
Aggregator	Score
Metacritic	78/100 (PSP); 70/100 (PS2)

Review scores
Publication	Score
1Up.com	B (PSP)
Eurogamer	7/10(PSP); 6.0/10 (PS2)
GamePro	4.5/5 (PSP)
GameSpot	6.5/10 (PSP); 6.0/10 (PS2)
GameSpy	4/5 (PSP)
IGN	8.0/10 (PSP); 7.0/10 (PS2)
PALGN	7/10 (PSP)

Most reviews for Silent Hill: Origins were positive; its original release on the PSP received a Metacritic aggregate score of 78 out of 100. GameDaily wrote that Origins "impressively brings all the elements we love about the Silent Hill franchise to a portable format that works wonderfully". Shane Bettenhausen of 1UP.com concluded: "Sure, it's predictable, conventional, and a little bit short, not to mention ill-suited for brief pick-up-and-play sessions on the bus, but we're encouraged to see developers making an original, console-quality experience for PSP". According to Kristan Reed of Eurogamer: "No doubt mindful of remaining faithful to the series' legacy, Climax pays such close attention to the ingredients of the first three Silent Hill games that it's basically an unapologetic homage to them". While stating that Origins would appeal to fans for its story that adds to the series' mythos, Game Informer added: "Unfortunately, the game has fallen into something like a rut in most other areas and less fanatical gamers won't be as forgiving of its faults".

The storyline was met with generally mixed feelings from reviewers. According to Kevin VanOrd of GameSpot, the premise was unoriginal and unsuspenseful, detracting from Travis' appeal as a protagonist, although he felt that the game provided new material for fans to analyze. PALGN's Mat Keller wrote that the Origins' "blatantly obvious" subtext failed to affect the player, in contrast to the subtext of previous installments. 1UP.com stated that while Origins suffered from heavy foreshadowing and predictable plot twists and character development, it added to the backstory of the series. Conversely, Wesley Yin-Poole of VideoGamer.com described the storyline as "engrossing".

Critics felt that the visual style was similar to those of the previous Silent Hill installments. Enjoying the visuals, Jeff Haynes of IGN wrote: "From the cluttered and junk strewn locations to the rusty, chaos filled doppelgangers of the alternate dimensions, everything feels like it's been stripped from one of the other titles and shrunk down to the handheld". Reviewers praised the graphics, the monster designs, the detailed environments, and atmosphere. However, some reviewers wrote that the character models could have been more detailed.

Gameplay drew a variety of reactions from "immersive" and "intriguing", to formulaic. The puzzles were generally considered by critics as challenging and well-done. The duration of the game was considered short, and reviewers criticized the spacing of the save points and absence of checkpoints. The game's adherence to the formula of the Silent Hill series also drew criticism; the opening comment of GameSpot's review remarked that "this old fog needs to learn some new tricks", and further detailed that the game provided "an entirely conventional adventure that relies on eight-year-old franchise hallmarks at the expense of anything truly new". Some camera issues were noted, especially in tight corridors. Reviewers wrote that Origins had a greater emphasis on combat than previous installments, although reaction to the combat was generally negative. Some reviewers felt that the player was encouraged to avoid combat, due to a variety of gameplay factors, including the breakable melee weapons. On the other hand, GameSpy's David Chapman stated that the readily available weapons made Travis too powerful. The inclusion of quick time events was not well received by reviewers, who felt that it added nothing appealing to the game. Additionally, the soundtrack was frequently praised as frightening, and a part of the game's appeal. The PlayStation Official Magazine UK wrote: "Despite its small-screen setting, Origins even manages a few genuine scares, mostly thanks to the first-rate sound: this should only be played through headphones".

The PS2 port was not as well received by reviewers, with a lower aggregate score of 70 out of 100, indicating "mixed or average reviews". The graphics of the port were considered by reviewers to be not as good as the PSP release and other installments in the series for the PS2. Conversely, a reviewer for GameZone wrote that despite some technical issues with the graphics, the visuals of the port sufficed. Other issues with the port commented on by critics include the lack of manual camera control, the absence of a mini-map or overall map for the more challenging areas, and no new bonus material for the port.
