= Silent Hill: The Arcade =

2007 video game

- Developer: Polygon Magic
- Publisher: Konami
- Directors: Hiroyuki Ashida; Tatsumi Sugiura
- Producers: Shigenobu Matsuyama; Kazuya Tominaga
- Artist: Tsutomu Kitazawa
- Composers: Akira Yamaoka; Masayuki Maruyama; Jun Ito
- Series: Silent Hill
- Platform: Arcade
- Release: JP: July 25, 2007; EU: 2008; SEA: 2008
- Genre: Rail shooter
- Modes: Single-player, multiplayer

Silent Hill: The Arcade (サイレントヒル アーケード, Sairento Hiru Ākēdo) is an arcade game spin-off of the survival horror video game series Silent Hill developed by Polygon Magic and published by Konami. The Arcade was first revealed at the 2007 Japan Arcade Operator's Union trade show by Konami.

Being a rail shooter, Silent Hill: The Arcade is a large departure from the normal survival horror mechanics of the main series.

== Gameplay ==
Silent Hill: The Arcade deals with two characters, Eric and Tina, who have entered the town of Silent Hill and must battle monsters while uncovering the mystery behind Eric's nightmares about a girl and a steamship. The gameplay is similar to the House of the Dead series in which players use light guns to aim and shoot at enemies. Shooting away from the screen reloads the player's gun. Throughout each level, health drinks and first-aid kits can restore a small or large amount of health respectively. Gold coins and silver coins can increase the score, the former gaining the most. The continue screen appears when all health is lost. If the player runs out of continues, the game is over.

The Arcade has a multiplayer element, where each player can choose to play as either Eric or Tina. A second player can join the game at any time as the other character. Progress can be saved by using the e-Amusement pass.

== Plot ==
Eric, one of the two protagonists

Eric, Tina, Bill, Jessie, Ryan and George are members of their school's Occult Club in Portland. They enter Silent Hill to investigate the rumors circulating around the area. Eric's great-grandfather was the captain of a steamboat called Little Baroness. Both disappeared along with the crew and passengers on Toluca Lake seventy-five years ago. After stopping in a motel to rest for the night, Eric and Tina awake to find their friends missing and the town shrouded in fog, crawling with monsters such as Pyramid Head who relentlessly pursues them.

While searching for their friends, they find Tina's 9-year-old pen-pal Emilie looking for her mother. The two are reunited until Emilie is thrown into Toluca Lake by a monstrous form of her mother who was murdered in a home burglary. Eric and Tina dive in to save her. At the bottom of the lake they find Emilie possessed by a little girl named Hanna, the one responsible for the disappearance of the Little Baroness after she was thrown overboard by her mother due to Hanna's terminal illness. Hanna mutates into a creature with only a head and tentacles until she is defeated.

Endings vary depending on whether the player saves their friends and destroys Hanna's tentacles. One has Eric and Tina freeing Hanna's spirit, the other depicts them trapped in the town permanently if she is not freed. A joke ending shows Eric and Tina in the Gradius video game which is being played by Robbie the Rabbit.

== Release and sales ==
Silent Hill: The Arcade was first released in Japan on July 25, 2007. Official statements by Konami referred to sales of the game in Japan as "strong".
