= Silent Hill 4: The Room =

2004 video game

- North American cover art
- Developer: Team Silent (Note: Team Silent was a group in Konami Computer Entertainment Tokyo. Ported to Windows and Xbox by Konami Software Shanghai.)
- Publisher: Konami
- Director: Suguru Murakoshi
- Producer: Akira Yamaoka
- Programmer: Kosuke Iwakura
- Artist: Masashi Tsuboyama
- Writer: Suguru Murakoshi
- Composer: Akira Yamaoka
- Series: Silent Hill
- Platforms: PlayStation 2; Xbox; Windows
- Release: PlayStation 2, Xbox: JP: June 17, 2004 (PS2); NA: September 7, 2004; EU: September 17, 2004; Windows: NA: September 7, 2004; EU: September 24, 2004
- Genre: Survival horror
- Mode: Single-player

Silent Hill 4: The Room (Note: Japanese: サイレントヒル4 ザ・ルーム, Hepburn: Sairento Hiru Fō Za Rūmu) is a 2004 survival horror video game developed by Konami's Team Silent and published by Konami. The fourth installment in the Silent Hill series, the game was released in Japan in June and in North America and Europe in September. Silent Hill 4 was released for the PlayStation 2, Xbox, and Windows. Its soundtrack was released at the same time. In 2012, it was released on the Japanese PlayStation Network. On October 2, 2020, it was re-released on GOG.com with patches to make it playable on Windows 10.

Unlike the previous installments, which were set primarily in the town of Silent Hill, this game is set in the southern part of the fictional city of Ashfield, and follows Henry Townshend as he attempts to escape from his locked-down apartment. During the course of the game, Henry explores a series of supernatural worlds and finds himself in conflict with an undead serial killer named Walter Sullivan.

Silent Hill 4 features an altered gameplay style with third-person navigation and plot elements taken from previous installments. Upon its release, the game received generally favorable reviews from critics, but its departure from the traditional formula of the previous games proved to be divisive. However, the game did receive praise for implementing some unique gameplay mechanics like the hauntings within the apartment.

== Gameplay ==
Combat gameplay screenshot

The objective of Silent Hill 4: The Room is to guide player character Henry Townshend as he seeks to escape from his apartment. Gameplay centers on the apartment, which is shown through a first-person perspective and contains the only save point. The other areas of the game are reached through holes formed in the apartment. For the first half of the game, the room restores Henry's health; in the second half of the game, however, the room becomes possessed by hauntings that drain his health.

In the main levels of the game the player uses the usual third-person view of the Silent Hill series. The player has a limited item inventory which can be managed by leaving unneeded items in a chest in Henry's room. Silent Hill 4 emphasizes combat during gameplay, with a near-absence of complex puzzles in favor of simple item-seeking tasks. Unlike previous games in the series, separate difficulty settings for combat and puzzles are not available; changing the combat difficulty also affects the difficulty of puzzles. In the second half of the game Henry is accompanied and helped in combat by his neighbor Eileen Galvin. Eileen cannot die while she is with Henry, although as she takes damage she succumbs to possession, which also occurs if she is given a firearm. The damage Eileen takes in the game determines whether or not she dies during the final boss fight, directly affecting the ending achieved.

=== Combat ===
Combat in Silent Hill 4 follows the pattern set by the other games with a few key differences. The player has access to a variety of melee weapons but only two firearms. Certain melee weapons are breakable. Items which can be equipped such as talismans (which protect the player from damage from the hauntings in Henry's room) will eventually break after a short period of use. Another key difference in the combat system is that melee attacks may be "charged" before they are used, inflicting a greater amount of damage to an opponent than a quick attack.

One of the most significant changes is the introduction of immortal ghosts of antagonist Walter Sullivan's victims. The ghosts, which have the ability to hurt Henry, can be nullified by two items. These items can also exorcise the hauntings in Henry's apartment. Ghosts can also be knocked down for a lengthy period of time with one of two special bullets or pinned permanently with a special sword.

== Story ==
=== Characters ===
The protagonist and player character of Silent Hill 4 is Henry Townshend, a resident of the South Ashfield Heights Apartments building in the fictitious town of Ashfield. Henry is an "average" man who has been described by Konami as an introvert in his late 20s. For the most part Henry navigates the game's world alone, although he eventually works with his neighbor Eileen Galvin. Henry also deals with the new supporting characters of Cynthia Velasquez, Andrew DeSalvo, Richard Braintree and Jasper Gein.

Silent Hill 4: The Room incorporates two unseen, minor characters from previous installments: investigative journalist Joseph Schreiber and deceased serial killer Walter Sullivan. Joseph was first referenced in Silent Hill 3 with a magazine article he has written condemning the "Hope House" orphanage run by Silent Hill's religious cult, which the game's protagonist, Heather, can discover. In Silent Hill 2, Walter is referenced in a newspaper article detailing his suicide in his jail cell after his murder of two children. Sullivan appears in two forms: an undead adult enemy and a neutral child supporting character. Walter's previous victims play a small role in the game as enemies.

=== Plot ===
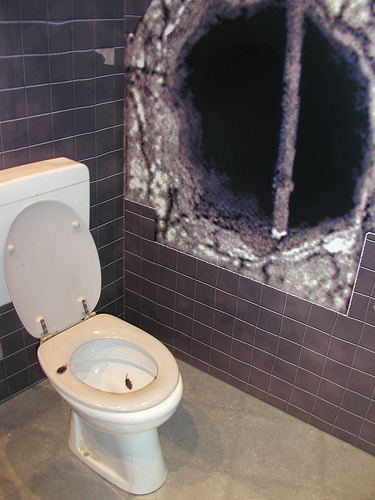
A model of the hole in Henry's apartment on display at the Games Convention 2004

Henry Townshend finds himself locked in his apartment for five days with no means of communication and having recurring nightmares. Shortly afterwards, a hole appears in the wall of his bathroom, through which he enters alternate dimensions. He ends up in an abandoned subway station, where he meets Cynthia Velasquez, a woman convinced she is dreaming and who is soon killed by an unknown man. Awakening in his apartment, he hears confirmation on his radio that she is indeed dead in the real world. Similar events repeat with the next few people Henry finds: Jasper Gein, a man fascinated with the paranormal and the cult of Silent Hill; Andrew DeSalvo, a former employee of an orphanage run by the aforementioned cult; and Richard Braintree, a resident in Henry's apartment complex. All the deaths bear similarities to deceased serial killer Walter Sullivan's modus operandi.

Henry finds diary scraps belonging to journalist Joseph Schreiber—the former inhabitant of his apartment—who was investigating Walter's murder spree. He discovers that Walter is an orphan who has been led to believe his biological mother was in Henry's apartment, where he had been found abandoned after birth. To "purify" the area, Walter, now in an undead state, is attempting to perform a ritual, which requires twenty-one murders to be committed. As Walter prepares to kill his twentieth victim, Eileen Galvin, a child manifestation of himself appears and stops him. Eileen agrees to join Henry in locating Joseph. At the same time, supernatural occurrences begin to manifest in Henry's apartment. The two eventually find Joseph's ghost, who tells them that the only way to escape is to kill Walter, and reveals that Henry is the intended twenty-first victim.

Shortly after Henry acquires Walter's umbilical cord, which they require to kill him, Eileen leaves Henry and returns to his apartment. Henry follows and finds her, possessed and about to walk into a deathtrap, and a fight between Henry and Walter ensues. There are four possible endings, determined by whether or not Eileen survives and the condition of Henry's apartment. The "21 Sacraments" ending sees Walter and his child manifestation in his apartment, while the radio reveals that Henry and Eileen have died, along with several others. In "Eileen's Death," Henry awakens in his apartment, and learns from his radio that Eileen has died, to his sorrow. In "Mother," Henry escapes from his apartment building, and brings flowers to Eileen, who plans to return to the apartment building. His apartment, meanwhile, has become completely possessed. "Escape" begins similarly to the "Mother" ending, but Eileen resolves to find a new place to live, and his apartment is not shown to be possessed. In a first for the series, there is no joke/UFO ending.

== Development ==
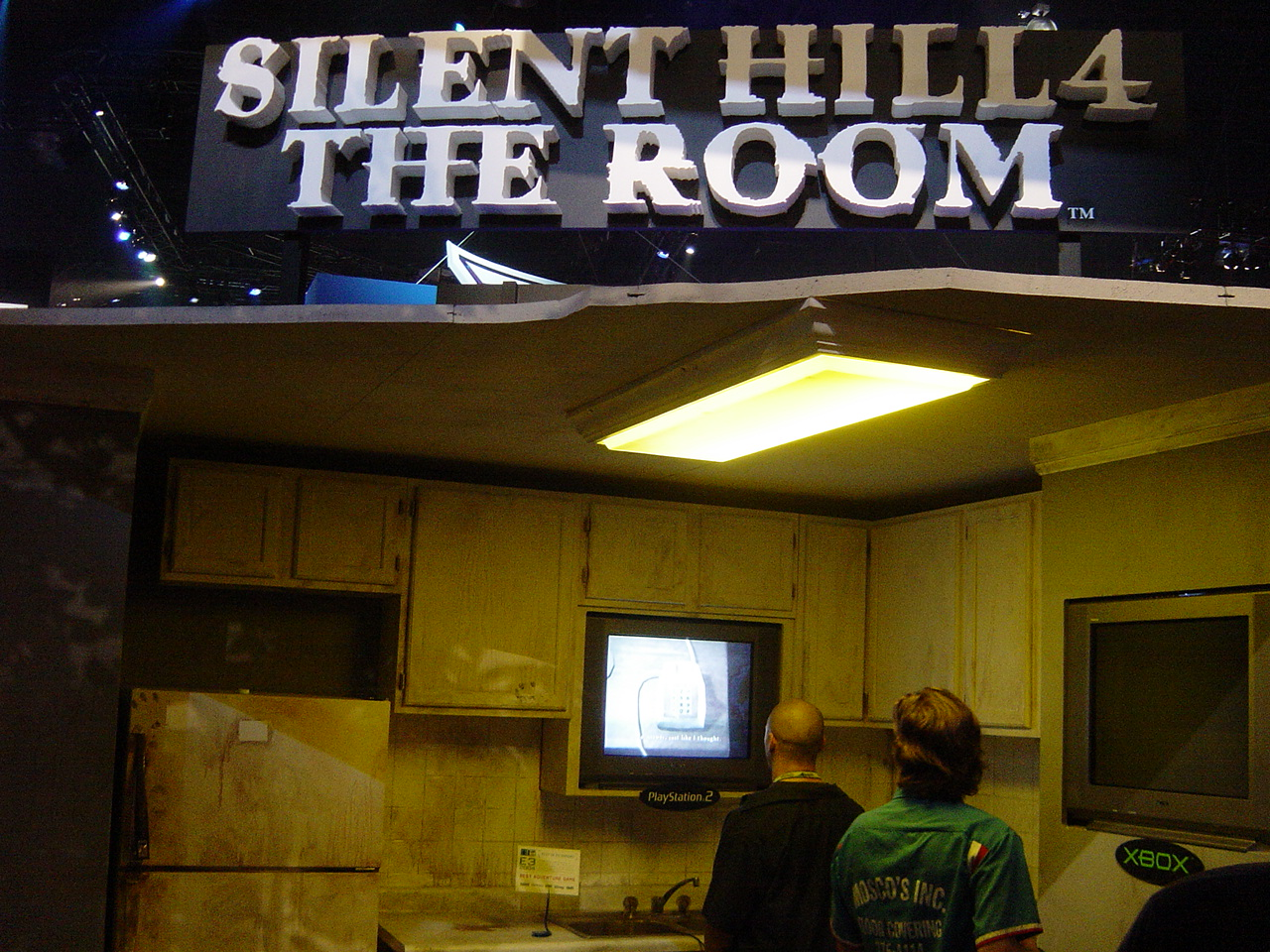
The game's promotional booth at the Electronic Entertainment Expo 2004

Development of the fourth Silent Hill game by Konami Computer Entertainment Tokyo's development group Team Silent began immediately after the development of Silent Hill 2 was completed, while developing Silent Hill 3 at the same time, with the intentions of creating a new style of game that would take the series in a different direction than the previous games. Pre-production began in fall 2001 and full production in spring 2002 with 70 people working on the game over 2.5 years. From the start of the development during pre-production in fall 2001, the game was originally titled The Room: Silent Hill, but the idea was eventually scrapped. The inclusion of The Room as a subtitle was meant for people to better understand the game's concept and to encourage newcomers to the series. News of the game's development was made public by October 2003, and official announcements by Konami followed at Gamers' Day 2004. The game was produced by the series' recurring sound designer and composer Akira Yamaoka. Despite what has been popularized around the Internet, Silent Hill 4: The Room was always a Silent Hill game right from the start of the development and not an unrelated separate horror game called Room 302 that later became a Silent Hill title for financial reasons, although different gameplay mechanics and changes were intended.

The main concept behind the new game structure was to take the idea of "the room" as "the safest part of your world" and make it a danger zone. The first-person perspective was included in this area of the game to give the room's navigation a personal and claustrophobic feel. The producers nonetheless retained the classic third-person perspective in all other areas to accommodate the increased emphasis on action and combat. The developers re-used locations already explored in the first half of the game to show the changes undergone by each character introduced in the locations.

It was noted that the game, like previous titles in the series, refers to the film Jacob's Ladder (1990) and that the protagonist Henry Townshend shares a likeness to actor Peter Krause. The architecture of the apartment and the addition of the hole is comparable to a similar non-Euclidean space in author Mark Z. Danielewski's novel House of Leaves (2000). Other nods includes the novel Rosemary's Baby (1967), American television series Twin Peaks (1990–1991), and American horror author Stephen King. The creators of the game have acknowledged writer Ryū Murakami's book Coin Locker Babies (1980) and the film The Cell (2000) as inspirations for the game's premise.

=== Music ===
The soundtrack for Silent Hill 4: The Room was released alongside the game in 2004, composed by Akira Yamaoka with vocals by Mary Elizabeth McGlynn and Joe Romersa. The Japanese version featured a second disc containing music by series composer Akira Yamaoka played along to the reading of traditional Japanese stories. The American version contained 13 exclusive tracks and remixes.

A remix of the song "Your Rain" from the game's soundtrack was used on Konami's Dance Dance Revolution Extreme. Several tracks from the game were also featured in the Silent Hill Experience promotional UMD.

== Release and sales ==
Silent Hill 4: The Room was first released in Japan on June 17, 2004. Silent Hill 4 topped game sales charts in Japan during a video game sales slump with 41,000 copies sold, but dropped to tenth place one week later. Official statements by Konami referred to sales of the game in Japan as "favorable". The game was shipped for its subsequent North American and European releases on September 7, with pre-ordering customers receiving the soundtrack for free with the game in the former market. Official statements by Konami referred to sales of the game in Europe as "favorable". Upon its release in 2004 the game also attracted the attention of mainstream news outlets CNN, the BBC and The Times. The game, alongside its two PS2 predecessors, was rereleased in 2006 as part of The Silent Hill Collection European boxset, as a tie-in with the release of the Silent Hill film, and again in 2009. Microsoft confirmed that their Xbox 360 console is backward compatible with the game's Xbox port. In March 2025, the game joined the GOG Preservation Program with improved stability and content that was previously not included on PC.

== Reception ==
Reception

Aggregate score
Aggregator	Score
Metacritic	76/100 (PS2); 76/100 (Xbox); 67/100 (PC)

Review scores
Publication	Score
1Up.com	B+ (PS2)
Eurogamer	7/10 (PS2); 6/10 (Xbox)
GameRevolution	B
GameSpot	7.9/10 (PS2); 7.9/10 (Xbox); 7.6/10 (PC)
GameSpy	4/5 (PS2)
IGN	8/10 (PS2); 8/10 (Xbox); 6.9/10 (PC)

The previews of Silent Hill 4: The Room provided at E3 2004 led IGN to name it the best PlayStation 2 adventure game in show.

Review aggregator Metacritic shows an average score rating of 76 out of 100 for both the PS2 and Xbox versions, indicating "generally favorable reviews". Marc Saltzman of CNN wrote: "Unlike Hollywood horror movies that often get worse with each new sequel (Friday the 13th Part VIII: Jason Takes Manhattan, for example), Konami's scary Silent Hill series gets better -- and creepier -- with age". Video game magazine Game Informer praised Silent Hill 4: The Room, stating that its "disarming voyeurism, bizarre camera angles, and exceptionally well-placed tension is what the series has been trying to do all along, but The Room is the first entry to do it right". According to a reviewer for Edge magazine, "[l]ook at it one way, and it's a choking journey with unprecedented attention to unease and psychological horror, a game framed with unparalleled sophistication. From another angle, it's just a clunky PSone throwback, with all the design wit of a dodo". The New York Times found it completely lacking in "true terror".

The plot of the game was generally well received by reviewers, who praised it as horrifying, compelling, and "dark". 1UP.com praised the titular room as constantly maintaining a sense of unease for the player. Game Revolution enjoyed the relatively normal appearance of the environment outside Henry's room at the game's beginning, writing: "Are these strange otherworlds real, or are they just the nightmares of some lunatic shut-in who chained up his own door? It effectively blurs the line between reality and delusion, leading to a singularly creepy game". In contrast, IGN's Douglass C. Perry felt that the familiarity of the story as compared with the other Silent Hill storylines detracted from its horror appeal, although he cared about its characters more than in previous games. Critics were, for the most part, pleased with the voice acting in the game, although it did receive criticism for the characters' calmness. Nevertheless, producer and composer Akira Yamaoka said that the characters were, to him, "a little weak".

The graphics of the game environments were praised as detailed. According to Bethany Massimilla of GameSpot: "The game looks its best in corroded, bloody, gritty environments, like the damp, steel halls of the water prison or the subterranean subway layers that, at one point in the game, are walled in living, moving flesh". The character and monster designs received praise as well-done. Reviewers generally commended the audio as contributing to the horror of the game, although 1UP wrote that it was sub-par for the series.

The gameplay's departures from that of previous installments in the series drew mixed reactions. GameZone enjoyed the changes, writing that they were needed to keep the series fresh. The decision to place the only save point and storage area for items in the titular room, with no option to discard unwanted items, was generally criticized, with reviewers finding it inconvenient to have to return there. The puzzles had mixed reactions. Kristan Reed of Eurogamer expressed disappointment with the degree to which the game had been geared as a combat game with an absence of standard Silent Hill puzzles, while GameSpy's Bryn Williams worried that the puzzles' obscurity and "non-lateral" nature might discourage more casual players. IGN disliked the replacement of logic-based puzzles in favour of obtaining various items, and was also displeased by the lack of boss fights. Another source of criticism was the repetition of the first four environments during the second half of the game.

Metacritic shows a lower average rating of 67 out of 100 for the PC version, indicating "mixed or average reviews". IGN's Perry complained about "the blurriest textures we've seen in years and some serious graphical glitches" and "extremely low mouse sensitivity" inhibiting gameplay. GameSpot's review praised the graphics as having "been optimized well for the PC" but acknowledging "keyboard and mouse controls just don't fare that well in an environment of constantly shifting perspective views that can make navigation frustrating".

Silent Hill 4 was a nominee for GameSpot's 2004 "Best Adventure Game" award, which ultimately went to Myst IV: Revelation.
