= Silent Hill 2 (2024 video game) =

Video game remake

- Developer: Bloober Team
- Publisher: Konami Digital Entertainment
- Director: Mateusz Lenart
- Producers: Maciej Głomb; Motoi Okamoto
- Designer: Mateusz Lenart
- Programmers: Mariusz Szaflik; Karol Długosz
- Artist: Mateusz Lenart
- Writer: Andrzej Mądrzak
- Composer: Akira Yamaoka
- Series: Silent Hill
- Engine: Unreal Engine 5
- Platforms: PlayStation 5; Windows; Xbox Series X/S
- Release: PlayStation 5, Windows; October 8, 2024; Xbox Series X/S; November 21, 2025
- Genre: Survival horror
- Mode: Single-player

Silent Hill 2 is a 2024 survival horror game developed by Bloober Team and published by Konami Digital Entertainment. It is a remake of the 2001 video game Silent Hill 2, originally developed by Team Silent, a group within Konami Computer Entertainment Tokyo (KCET). It is the first major installment in the Silent Hill series since Silent Hill: Downpour (2012). Like the original game, it follows James Sunderland, a widower, who returns to the eponymous town in Maine upon receiving a letter from his deceased wife, Mary, who claims to be waiting there for him.

The remake of Silent Hill 2 was officially announced in October 2022, following months of speculation and leaks. It was led by Bloober Team creative director Mateusz Lenart and produced by Motoi Okamoto from Konami. Masahiro Ito and Akira Yamaoka, who served as creature designer and composer for the original game, respectively, took an active part in development. According to Maciej Głomb, Ito provided concept art for locations and monsters while Yamaoka returned as a composer.

Silent Hill 2 was released for PlayStation 5 and Windows on October 8, 2024, and later released on Xbox Series X/S on November 21, 2025. The game has received generally positive reviews from critics, who praised its story, graphics, atmospheric setting, performances and faithfulness to the source material. It had sold over 2.5 million units by October 2025, and earned several awards, including nominations at the British Academy Games Awards, the Golden Joystick Awards, and the Game Awards.

== Gameplay ==
The objective of Silent Hill 2 is to guide James Sunderland, the player character, through the titular town of Silent Hill as he searches for his wife and battles monsters. In contrast to its original counterpart, Silent Hill 2 features a modernized third-person camera system with an overhauled combat system.

The game is structured into a series of areas and chapters, each representing a segment of James's psychological and emotional journey. These areas include streets, buildings, apartments, and infamous Silent Hill locations such as Brookhaven Hospital and the Lakeview Hotel. Players explore detailed, dimly lit environments using a flashlight and map to navigate. Many areas require key items to progress, found by solving puzzles or defeating enemies. Environmental storytelling and ambient sound design play a major role in creating a tense, immersive experience. Players have access to several melee weapons such as a plank and a steel pipe, and firearms such as a pistol and a shotgun. Combat is clunky by design, enhancing the vulnerability of the protagonist. Conserving ammunition and health items is critical, as resources are limited.

The game features numerous puzzles ranging from simple key-finding to abstract riddles. Puzzle difficulty can be set separately from combat difficulty, affecting how complex the solutions are. Some puzzles require interpreting notes, environmental clues, or symbolic logic. Silent Hill 2 features multiple endings based on how players behave throughout the game: health item usage, behavior toward a companion character, time spent in certain areas, etc. These endings reflect James's psychological state and provide different interpretations of the story.

== Synopsis ==
=== Setting ===
Silent Hill 2 is set in the small resort town of Silent Hill in Maine. Shrouded in a thick fog, the town is apparently abandoned and unkempt, but Silent Hill presents a seemingly shifting infrastructure, in which the player experiences an even more worn and decaying version of the town, and the Otherworld, marked by rust, wire fences, and an encompassing darkness. It is implied that the town's appearance is subjective to the beholder; where some see fog, others may see fire or ice.

The playable character is James Sunderland (Luke Roberts), a man drawn to the town by the possibility of seeing his deceased wife, Mary (Salóme Gunnarsdóttir). During his exploration of Silent Hill, James encounters Angela Orosco (Gianna Kiehl), a troubled and suicidal nineteen-year-old girl searching for her mother; Eddie Dombrowski (Danny Kirrane; (Note: Appearance) Scott Haining (Note: Voice)), an overweight, bullied, and paranoid man; and Laura (Evie Templeton), a mischievous but innocent eight-year-old girl who knew Mary when she was alive and dislikes James. James also meets Maria (Gunnarsdóttir), a woman who shares an uncanny physical resemblance to Mary.

=== Plot ===
James arrives in Silent Hill after receiving a letter from his wife Mary, who died three years earlier from a degenerative disease. He meets Angela and dismisses her warning that the town is dangerous, but finds it inhabited by inhuman creatures, and himself stalked by an indestructible monster, Pyramid Head.

At Toluca Lake, where James believes Mary is waiting for him, he meets Maria, who resembles Mary, but has a more assertive and flirtatious personality. Maria helps James search for Mary, coming across Eddie and Laura in a cinema, but Laura runs away from James. Finding herself inexplicably worried about Laura's safety, Maria insists on following her to the hospital, but falls ill soon after arriving. James finds Laura, who tells him that she befriended Mary a year earlier while they were hospitalized, but she locks James in a room and runs away when he does not believe her. James and a recovered Maria are ambushed by Pyramid Head, who kills Maria; a despondent James escapes. He traverses a decrepit prison, where he rescues Angela from a monster representing her father, whom she killed after enduring years of his sexual abuse. Despite James's help, Angela accuses him of not wanting the ailing Mary around.

James enters a labyrinth where he finds Maria alive and unharmed behind impassable bars. She expresses disbelief at her apparent death and recounts Mary's memories, including James forgetting a videotape at the Lakeview Hotel during their last vacation. Maria encourages the confused James to find a way to free her, offering to be anything he wants her to be. On his return, however, he finds Maria dead, disfigured in the same way Mary was by the disease. After leaving the labyrinth, James confronts Eddie, who believes he has been killing people who mocked him. Eddie gleefully admits to maiming a bully and killing a dog before arriving in Silent Hill. Assuming James is also mocking him, Eddie attacks, forcing James to reluctantly kill him in self-defense.

At the hotel, Laura gives James a goodbye letter she received from Mary a week earlier, celebrating Laura's eighth birthday and expressing her desire for Laura to become her daughter. Realizing that Mary could not have died three years ago, James watches the videotape, which depicts their idyllic vacation before transitioning to James fatally smothering Mary. His memories restored, Mary's letter to James disappears, and he confesses the truth to Laura. James then encounters Angela, who thanks him for saving her but wishes he had not. Still unable to overcome her trauma, she asks James for a knife, but he refuses. Angela then ascends a burning staircase, resigned to her fate.

Afterward, James is confronted by two Pyramid Heads, who execute a revived Maria in front of him. James deduces that Pyramid Head was created as a result of his desire for punishment, but as he no longer needs them, the Pyramid Heads commit suicide. At the hotel's rooftop, he defeats a monstrous version of either Mary—who refuses to forgive him—or Maria—who refuses to let him abandon her.

The ending varies based on the player's actions: in "Leave", James tells Mary that he resented her for her illness and hostility toward him—fueled by her feelings of inadequacy and fear of her death—leading him to kill her to free them both. Sensing his regret, Mary forgives him, giving him her real final letter, in which she tells James that he made her happy and encourages him to live. He leaves the town with Laura; in "Maria", James chooses Maria over Mary and leaves with her. Maria coughs, implying she will become sick like Mary; "In Water" sees James, unable to live without Mary, commit suicide by driving into Toluca Lake; "Stillness" expands on this, showing Mary comforting James before his death; "Bliss" sees James seemingly enter the vacation videotape, choosing to remain ignorant of his actions; and in "Rebirth", James plans to resurrect Mary by summoning the town's old gods. Two joke endings feature James discovering a Shiba Inu orchestrated the game's events ("Dog") or being abducted by aliens ("UFO").

== Development ==
In June 2021, Polish developer Bloober Team announced that they had embarked on a "strategic co-operation agreement" with Konami that would involve "jointly developing selected contents and exchanging know-how" with the publisher. Bloober Team CEO Piotr Babieno commented on the deal, asserting that "The fact that such a renowned company as Konami has decided to strategically cooperate with the Bloober Team means that we [have] also joined the world leaders in gaming and become an equal partner for the leading players in this market". Konami issued a separate statement, with the publisher remarking, "We don't have any specifics to share at this time, but we can say while Bloober Team will continue to produce their own original content, we're excited at the chance to collaborate with them on potential projects across our various IP".

In September 2022, a series of leaks revealed purported images sourced from a planned remake of Silent Hill 2 to be developed by Bloober Team, adding to substantiated reports that Konami was supervising an initiative to revive the series by outsourcing future games to collaborative developers. An internet leaker alleged that the images were taken from an internal test demo Bloober Team developed to pitch the project to Konami, and as a result did not represent the final title. The leaked images were subsequently taken down by Konami representatives. Another leak alluding to the game appeared the following month, through a YouTube description for a trailer accidentally made public by Konami themselves.

In October 2022, the remake was officially announced by Konami during their Silent Hill Transmission presentation, alongside other games such as Silent Hill f, Silent Hill: Townfall, and Silent Hill: Ascension, as well as the film Return to Silent Hill. It is the first game in an ongoing initiative by Konami to rejuvenate mainstream interest in the franchise, which had not seen a new major entry since the release of Silent Hill: Book of Memories (2012) and the subsequent cancellation of Silent Hills from former internal studio Kojima Productions. It was confirmed at the presentation that creature designer Masahiro Ito and original composer Akira Yamaoka would return to contribute to the remake. It uses Unreal Engine 5.

Bloober Team creative director and lead designer Mateusz Lenart cited the importance of "preserving the atmosphere that made Silent Hill 2 so exceptional, while modernizing many aspects of the game's overall gameplay" as a key factor in the decision to remake the game. Lenart additionally revealed that the original third-person combat system and certain story set pieces were completely rebuilt. In an interview with Famitsu, producer Motoi Okamoto stated that Bloober Team and the staff at Konami had differing opinions on what aspects of the remake should be modernized, versus being preserved from the original. However, he noted that "thanks to the [opinions] of Bloober Team, who are big fans of the original, the remake ended up being highly respectful of the original game." The game includes nods and easter eggs to previous Silent Hill entries such as the "Silent Hill Ranch" sign written in comic sans from the Silent Hill HD Collection.

== Release ==
Silent Hill 2 was released for PlayStation 5 and Windows on October 8, 2024. Pre-orders of the digital deluxe edition of the game allowed for a 48-hour advanced access. It was a PS5 console exclusive for the first year and was eventually released on Xbox Series X/S on November 21, 2025.

== Reception ==
=== Critical response ===
Reception

Aggregate scores
Aggregator	Score
Metacritic	87/100 (PC) (Note: Based on 26 critic reviews); 86/100 (PS5) (Note: Based on 108 critic reviews); 86/100 (XSXS) (Note: Based on 8 critic reviews)
OpenCritic	94% (Note: Based on 158 critic reviews)

Review scores
Publication	Score
Digital Trends	4/5
Eurogamer	5/5
Famitsu	35/40
Game Informer	8.75/10
GameRevolution	10/10
GameSpot	9/10
GamesRadar+	3.5/5
IGN	8/10
Push Square	9/10
TechRadar	3.5/5
VG247	5/5

Silent Hill 2 received "generally favorable" reviews from critics, according to review aggregator website Metacritic. OpenCritic reported that 95% of critics recommended the game. In Japan, four critics from Famitsu gave the game a total score of 35 out of 40.

Critics praised Silent Hill 2's faithfulness to its source material. Giovanni Colantonio of Digital Trends deemed the game a "faithful tribute to a horror classic that hardly holds anything back" and lauded Bloober for not interfering with the original story. Eurogamer's Vikki Blake noted its expansion and for giving "careful attention to what it preserves." Jason Faulkner of Game Revolution, who gave Silent Hill 2 a perfect score in his review, wrote that it "sets a new golden standard when it comes to remakes", and noted how the story is "carried over completely intact, honoring the original narrative while adding depth where appropriate."

Silent Hill 2's atmosphere and graphics were highlighted by critics. Ben Rayner of Digital Spy stated that the visuals "are impressive and really elevate the tension of exploring Silent Hill's abandoned buildings and streets—each feeling just off enough to ratchet that tension up as you dig deeper." Tristan Ogilvie of IGN likened its environment to "a scab you can't stop picking." Also praised was the overhaul of the soundtrack, which Mark Delaney of GameSpot called "incredible" and "unforgettable, even as it's often deliberately at odds with the events you're seeing on the screen."

There was some criticism of Silent Hill 2's gameplay. Colantonio said it was "padded with backtracking" and the combat "gets old". Delaney praised its melee combat, but criticized the abundance of ammo and health items provided for the player. Leon Hurley of GamesRadar+ called it a "mix of clumsy pipe swinging and wobbly aiming," but praised the ability to dodge. TechRadar's Sarah Thwaites reacted more negatively, writing that "clunky combat doesn't work with a new camera angle, making for frustrating fights". In a positive review, Liam Croft of Push Square believed it was one of the game's strengths and called it "weighty". Kelsey Raynor of VG247 called it "good enough".

=== Sales ===
Silent Hill 2 sold over 1 million units within four days since release, making it the fastest-selling game in the series (before Silent Hill f surpassed this record), and over 2 million units as of January 2025. By October 2025, the game had sold over 2.5 million units, helping to bring franchise sales to 13 million units. By January 2026, the game had sold over 5 million copies.

=== Awards ===
At the IGN Japan Awards on December 11–12, Silent Hill 2 was awarded Best Sound Design, Best Story, and Game of the Year. On December 20, the IGN Awards recognized it as Best Horror Game and nominated it for Best Game and Best PlayStation Game, while the game won IGN Community Awards's Best Horror Game. A week later, Shacknews named Silent Hill 2 the Best Horror Game at its annual online event.

Award	Date	Category	Recipient(s) and nominee(s)	Result	Ref(s).
Golden Joystick Awards	November 21, 2024	Ultimate Game of the Year	Silent Hill 2	Nominated	
Golden Joystick Awards	November 21, 2024	Best Lead Performer	Luke Roberts as James Sunderland	Nominated	
Golden Joystick Awards	November 21, 2024	Best Soundtrack	Akira Yamaoka	Nominated	
Titanium Awards	December 6, 2024	Best Sound Design	Silent Hill 2	Nominated	
The Game Awards	December 12, 2024	Best Action/Adventure Game	Silent Hill 2	Nominated	
The Game Awards	December 12, 2024	Best Audio Design	Silent Hill 2	Nominated	
The Game Awards	December 12, 2024	Best Narrative	Silent Hill 2	Nominated	
The Game Awards	December 12, 2024	Best Performance	Luke Roberts as James Sunderland	Nominated	
The Game Awards	December 12, 2024	Best Score and Music	Akira Yamaoka	Nominated	
The Steam Awards	December 31, 2024	Outstanding Visual Style	Silent Hill 2	Won	
The Steam Awards	December 31, 2024	Best Soundtrack	Akira Yamaoka	Nominated	
New York Game Awards	January 21, 2025	Best Remake	Silent Hill 2	Won	
Famitsu Dengeki Game Awards 2024	March 15, 2025	Best Action Adventure	Silent Hill 2	Nominated	
Game Developers Choice Awards	March 19, 2025	Best Audio	Silent Hill 2	Honorable Mention	
British Academy Games Awards	April 8, 2025	Performer in a Leading Role	Luke Roberts as James Sunderland	Nominated	
British Academy Games Awards	April 8, 2025	Technical Achievement	Silent Hill 2	Longlisted	
