= List of Silent Hill 2 characters =

Characters in a Video Game Franchise

- Silent Hill characters
- First game: Silent Hill 2 (2001)
- Designed by: Takayoshi Sato

The survival horror video game Silent Hill 2 features a large cast of characters.

== Conception and design ==
Silent Hill 2's characters were designed by Takayoshi Sato. Team Silent, a production group within Konami Computer Entertainment Tokyo, oversaw the process. Team Silent designed the character Maria to have physical flaws and did not base her on any particular model. The developers toned down her design because of technical problems with her low neckline. To better capture her facial movements, Sato Takayoshi practiced expressions in front of a mirror and drew her facial expressions instead of using motion capture. Maria and Mary share the same facial structure, polygon count and voice actor; only the muscle structure differs. Takayoshi designed Angela to appear older than her intended age of nineteen and the developers chose an older voice actor for her. Fifty to sixty Japanese and American voice actors auditioned for Silent Hill 2, with five ultimately chosen: Guy Cihi, Donna Burke, David Schaufele, Jakey Breckenridge, and Monica Horgan. Motion capture of the voice actors was used to model their action.

== Characters ==
=== James Sunderland ===
James Sunderland (ジェイムス・サンダーランド, Jeimusu Sandārando) is the primary player character of Silent Hill 2. His connection to Silent Hill is a letter from his wife Mary that arrives just after her death. The letter gradually fades, suggesting that James only imagined it. He encounters a videotape that shows him killing Mary. He concludes that he wants to be punished for the murder.

Subsequent installments in the series made references to James. James makes cameo appearances in the joke endings of Silent Hill 3, Silent Hill: Shattered Memories (voiced by Tomm Hulett) and Silent Hill: Downpour.

James was portrayed by Guy Cihi in the original version, by Troy Baker in the game's 2012 remastering, and by Luke Roberts in the 2024 remake.

=== Maria ===
Maria (マリア) is a sexualized manifestation of Mary based on an exotic dancer. She exists only in James' mind. She first appears in "Born from a Wish", a sub-scenario prior to the events in the main game that appeared in the expanded versions of Silent Hill 2. Thereafter she accompanies James throughout the game, repeatedly getting killed and reappearing.

Maria is portrayed by Monica Taylor Horgan.

=== Angela Orosco ===
Angela Orosco (アンジェラ・オラスコ, Anjera Orasuko) is a disturbed, suicidal young woman who is ostensibly on a search for her mother. Angela was abused and raped as a child by her father and brother, with her mother turning a blind eye. Backstory material provided by Konami states that Angela had run away from home prior to the game's events. She had also killed her father, which draws her to Silent Hill.

She is last seen on a burning staircase in the Lakeview Hotel. She walks into the flames and is not seen again.

Angela is voiced in the game by Donna Burke. The designers intended to make her appear unnaturally aged.

=== Mary Shepherd-Sunderland ===
Mary Shepherd-Sunderland (メアリー・シェパード・サンダーランド, Mearī Shepādo Sandārando) is the late wife of James Sunderland. The player first sees Mary in a photograph with James. She is presented to have died from a mysterious illness. The couple shared many memories in Silent Hill. She appears in person only at the end of the game.

Mary made a cameo in Silent Hill: Shattered Memories in her monster form and in a joke ending of Downpour and Book of Memories.

Mary (and Maria) was portrayed by Monica Taylor Horgan. The producers acknowledged that the two were designed to be almost completely identical. In the 2026 film, she is portrayed by Hannah Emily Anderson.

=== Eddie Dombrowski ===
Eddie Dombrowski (エディー・ドンブラウスキー, Edī Donburausukī) is the third murderous character in Silent Hill. He is an obese young man with an apparent connection to Laura. He has suffered verbal abuse for much of his life. Before his arrival he killed a dog, shot a football player and ran from the police. Backstory material provided by Konami describes Eddie as being usually calm but with "another side that he cannot control when angered" and working at a gas station. Eddie wears a baseball cap, short shorts, and a white and teal striped shirt.

His final appearances are in the prison/labyrinth, where he confesses to both murders. His final appearance takes place in a meat locker.

=== Laura ===
Laura (ローラ, Rōra) is an eight-year-old girl wandering the town. She is the only "innocent" human character. Laura can apparently safely move around the town, while occasionally placing James in danger. Laura is an orphan who befriended Mary during her last year alive, while a patient at the same hospital.

== Monsters ==
=== Abstract Daddy ===
The Abstract Daddy is a boss character, appearing as a manifestation of both the memory of Mary as well as Angela's sexually abusive father. Appearing as a "four-legged lump of flesh", it has a rectangular frame extending from its abdomen that earned it the nickname "Doorman". From James' perspective, the Abstract Daddy represents Mary in bed. It later appears as a regular enemy. According to Silent Hill 2 art director Masahiro Ito, the player is only able to see what the Abstract Daddy looks like from James' point of view, while how Angela perceives it is unknowable to James, the player, and himself.

=== Bubble Headed Nurses ===
The Bubble Head Nurses are enemies that James encounters throughout Silent Hill, particularly at its hospital. Its face is bloodied and swollen, lurching towards James as their heads shake. They manifest both as representations of James' anxiety surrounding Mary's hospitalization and of his sexual frustrations. According to Silent Hill 2 art director Masahiro Ito, its head was designed to represent "suffocated invalid Mary's [swollen] head", stating that the Bubble Head Nurse shakes its head like it is "struggling to shake off the covered vinyl". It was identified as the Silent Hill series' most iconic monster after Pyramid Head.

=== Mannequin ===
The Mannequins are monsters that have manifested from James' guilt that, unless approached, stand perfectly still. They feature insect-like mannerisms, and have a strong reaction to light. They are made up of multiple sets of legs attached to the upper and lower parts of a torso; according to Silent Hill 2 art director Masahiro Ito, the mannequin has a less-than-human appearance because James is unable to remember what he did and who the mannequin represents. Ito's design for the Mannequins was inspired by a pair of yokai called Ashinagatenaga.

=== Pyramid Head ===
Pyramid Head is the main antagonist of Silent Hill 2. Pyramid Head is also known as "Red Pyramid Thing" (赤い三角頭, Akai Sankakutō), "Red Pyramid", or "Bogeyman", and "Triangle Head" (三角頭, Sankaku Atama) in Japan. It represents James' wish to be punished for Mary's death. Masahiro Ito, the designer of Silent Hill 2's monsters, created Pyramid Head because he wanted "a monster with a hidden face". Known for a large triangular head, Pyramid Head lacks a voice. Its appearance stems from the "distorted memory of the executioners" and the town's past as a place of execution, according to Takayoshi Sato, the character designer for Silent Hill 2. It was positively received in Silent Hill 2 for its role as an element of James' psyche.

After Silent Hill 2 Pyramid Head appeared in other Silent Hill games and media and became an icon in horror video games. Pyramid Head appeared in Homecoming as the "Bogeyman", in a cameo in Origins in a painting and a joke ending in Downpour and in the Silent Hill film as "Red Pyramid" and Revelation. He appeared in The Arcade, The Escape and Book of Memories. He appeared as a player character in the Nintendo DS video game New International Track & Field and Konami Krazy Racers.

== Critical reception ==
Critics noted the level of realistic detail given to the characters of Silent Hill 2 and Konami's ability to transition between CG and in-game scenes. Game Revolution liked that James was an everyman character instead of a highly trained professional. GameZone praised James' sympathetic character, and found the voice acting improved, though not flawless, as compared to Silent Hill 2's predecessor. Another reviewer considered the voice acting and script superior to the survival horror video game series Resident Evil, while GameSpot criticized the script for hampering the voice acting. IGN's Emma Boyes praised the relationship between James and Mary, listing it as one of "The Greatest Video Game Couples".

Upon debut of the game's remake, fans were conflicted regarding changes to the character designs, particularly Maria and Angela. In particular, according to Jordan Gerblick of GamesRadar+, some were surprised to discover Angela was 19, when many had assumed she was in her 30's or 40's due to the original game's graphics. Others meanwhile noticed that the characters, particular Angela, more closely resembled Sato's original concept art for the cast, with Gerblick concluding that the changes were less on a whim and more to try and reflect the source material more closely.

Regardless, some accused changes to the design of being cases of censorship, specifically in regards to Maria's outfit. Writer Mike Drucker in an article for The Gamer stated that while her redesign was more conservative, he felt the larger issue was that the changes were "ridiculous and miss the point". Going further, he argued making these changes when her whole character's existence served as a sexualized ideal of James' wife Mary and his objectification of her ignored that it was a part of her characterization, not her appeal. However, he countered that such changes did not constitute censorship, as the original game and its designs were unaltered, and suggested the change may have been done more due to the development team perhaps feeling her original outfit was too "gaudy" compared to a more sleek design.
