= Return to Silent Hill =

2026 film by Christophe Gans

- American theatrical release poster
- Directed by: Christophe Gans
- Written by: Christophe Gans; Sandra Vo-Anh; Will Schneider
- Based on: Silent Hill 2 by Konami
- Produced by: Victor Hadida; Molly Hassell; David M. Wulf
- Starring: Jeremy Irvine; Hannah Emily Anderson
- Cinematography: Pablo Rosso
- Edited by: Sébastien Prangère
- Music by: Akira Yamaoka
- Production companies: Davis Films; Ashland Hill Media Finance; Electric Shadow; Supernix; WIP; Konami
- Distributed by: Metropolitan Filmexport (France); Cineverse (Note: Released through their Bloody Disgusting and Screambox labels.); Iconic Events Releasing (United States)
- Release dates: January 23, 2026 (United States); February 4, 2026 (France)
- Running time: 106 minutes
- Countries: France; United States
- Language: English
- Budget: $23 million
- Box office: $48 million

Return to Silent Hill is a 2026 supernatural psychological horror film written and directed by Christophe Gans, co-written by Sandra Vo-Anh and Will Schneider, and produced by Victor Hadida through his Davis Films banner. Loosely based on the 2001 video game Silent Hill 2 by Konami, it is the third Silent Hill film and a reboot. Starring Jeremy Irvine and Hannah Emily Anderson, it follows James Sunderland, a broken man who receives a mysterious letter which calls him back to Silent Hill in search of his lost love. However, he finds a once-recognizable town and encounters terrifying figures both familiar and new, and begins to question his sanity.

Plans for a new Silent Hill film adaptation began in December 2006; Gans and former writer Roger Avary had been hired to helm a film adaptation of Silent Hill 2, which was greenlit by Sony. However, the project did not move forward and was instead released as a sequel titled Silent Hill: Revelation (2012) without Gans and Avary's involvement. By 2020, Gans announced he was working on a new Silent Hill film, adapting the events of the second game. The film was greenlit in October 2022, with Gans returning to write and direct the project. An international co-production between France and the United States, the film was shot in Germany and Serbia from April 2023 to February 2024.

Return to Silent Hill was released theatrically in the United States by Cineverse and Iconic Events Releasing on January 23, 2026, and was released in France by Metropolitan Filmexport on February 4. The film received negative reviews from critics and has grossed $48 million worldwide, with a budget of $23 million.

== Plot ==
Artist James Sunderland has a chance meeting with Mary Crane as she is leaving her hometown of Silent Hill. When he inadvertently causes her to miss a bus, she decides to go back. James offers her a ride, and they spark a romance, eventually moving in together in Silent Hill.

Years later, James has moved away and become an alcoholic following the end of his relationship with Mary, while a concerned psychologist attempts to rehabilitate him. He receives a letter from Mary urging him to return to Silent Hill, and he hastily does so. Upon arrival, he discovers that the town is covered in fog and falling ash, and has been almost entirely abandoned due to an unspecified illness that killed many. He meets a woman named Angela and is later attacked by a monstrous entity.

The town transforms into a twisted, unearthly version of itself, and James is forced to flee to the Wood Side Apartment building where he and Mary once lived. Inside, he meets a violent and mentally unstable man named Eddie and a young girl named Laura. James learns that Mary was taken to Brookhaven Hospital and then encounters a ghoulish figure known as Pyramid Head who frightens Eddie away. After a tense encounter with Pyramid Head, James wakes up back in the "real" Silent Hill where he again encounters Angela and Laura; Laura claims that she knows Mary.

While chasing Laura, James meets a woman named Maria who looks nearly identical to Mary and offers to tag along with him to Brookhaven. Along the way, James recalls several memories where he witnessed Mary's involvement with a cult operating in Silent Hill, one founded by her father. After seeing her being drugged and taking part in an arcane ritual, he and Mary broke up, abandoning her in Silent Hill.

Shortly after arriving at the hospital, Maria discovers an audio tape explaining that Mary was poisoned and left with permanent injuries. The hospital transforms into a nightmarish version of itself, and Maria is stabbed by a grotesque nurse mid-escape. James momentarily leaves her and is lured into a room by Laura, where he encounters a giant, monstrous moth-like version of Mary.

James suddenly awakens in Brookhaven where his psychologist explains that Mary died shortly after their breakup, and he has become delusional and obsessed with "saving her". The hospital transforms back into the Otherworld, and James deduces that Maria isn't real but a doppelgänger of Mary. He finds himself in a gallery made up of dozens of paintings of Mary and declares that he doesn't need Maria anymore. Pyramid Head suddenly appears behind Maria and kills her; James briefly sees a version of himself under Pyramid Head's mask.

James awakens outside of the Lakeview Hotel, which he and Mary used to frequent. Inside, he encounters Laura, who explains that she, Maria, and Angela are all figments of James' imagination based on aspects of Mary's personality and life. James also sees a vision of Angela being attacked and enveloped by a ferocious monster resembling Mary's father.

James makes it to the roof of Lakeview Hotel, where he has a final flashback. James recalls that he returned to Silent Hill several months prior to find Mary dying of a prolonged illness caused by the cult drugging her; Mary asked for a mercy killing to end her incurable suffering, and James smothered her to death. The moth-like version of Mary appears before James, and he tearfully apologizes to her. It transforms back into Mary's body.

James places Mary's body in his car and drives off a pier in an apparent suicide. He suddenly wakes up in the moment when he and Mary met, and relives their first encounter. However, this time he chooses not to take her back to Silent Hill, instead driving away with her.

== Cast ==
- Jeremy Irvine as James Sunderland, an alcoholic painter who has depression following the death of his girlfriend.
- Hannah Emily Anderson as Mary Crane, the girlfriend of James.
  - Anderson additionally portrays Maria, Angela, and Moth Mary.
- Evie Templeton as Laura, a young girl who James encounters within Silent Hill. Templeton reprises her role from the 2024 remake of Silent Hill 2.
- Pearse Egan as Eddie, a man who briefly encounters James within Silent Hill.
- Robert Strange as Pyramid Head, a monstrous creature who James encounters in Silent Hill.
- Nicola Alexis as M, James' therapist.
- Giulia Pelagatti as Lying Figure, a monster that stalks James and vomits acidic liquid.
  - Pelagatti also plays the monster known as Spider Lady as well as one of the monstrous Nurses.

== Production ==
=== Initial plans (2006–2007) ===
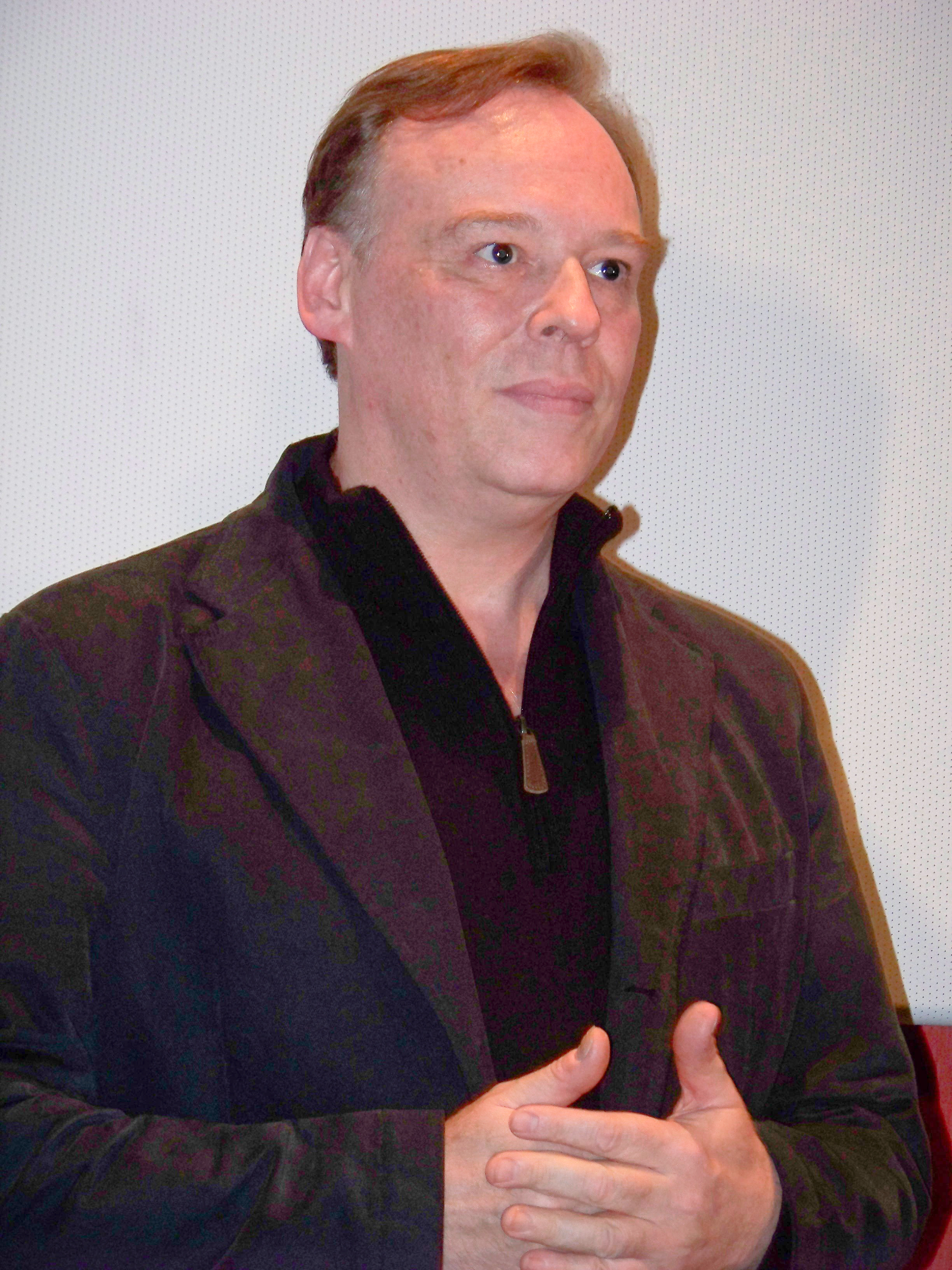
Gans (pictured in 2010) had initial plans for adapting the second game in 2006.

In December 2006, Silent Hill writer/director Christophe Gans announced that Sony had officially ordered another installment in the Silent Hill film series. Gans stated that he would like to return to the franchise, subject to his commitment to Onimusha, and stated that Roger Avary would write the screenplay.

In April 2007, producer Don Carmody said a screenplay was in slow development and suggested that Gans would likely not return as director due to other commitments. In November 2010, Sony Pictures announced that M. J. Bassett would direct from her own screenplay, Samuel Hadida was attached as producer and that filming was expected to begin "this winter". Avary was sentenced to one year in jail for vehicular manslaughter, preventing his involvement. The sequel, Silent Hill: Revelation, was released in 2012. Gans said that he was supposed to direct Revelation, "but when I realized the producers wanted to make the film a kind of Resident Evil, I refused. I wanted to stay true to my principles."

=== Revival (2020–2025) ===
In January 2020, Gans told French magazine Allocine that he was in the process of writing new screenplays based on the Silent Hill and Fatal Frame series by Konami and Koei Tecmo with producer Victor Hadida. He later clarified that the work was not a direct sequel to the 2006–2012 film series and that his sensibilities had evolved since the release of the first film. He also described the series as an anthology similar to The Twilight Zone, a place where any story could be told, and intended to depict a more psychoanalytic side to the town.

Written by Gans, Sandra Vo-Anh, and Will Schneider, Return to Silent Hill adapts of video game Silent Hill 2 (2001), with the intention being to create a "faithful" adaptation of the game. Since the game has multiple possible endings, Gans chose to adapt the lake ending which he found to be the most emotionally resonant. Gans said in September 2022 that he had finished the storyboards and that the film takes inspiration from P.T. (2014), the playable teaser for the cancelled game Silent Hills. By October 2022, the film was green-lit with the title Return to Silent Hill. Gans worked with Konami to create a new aesthetic for the monsters, including those that had been featured in his previous films, such as Pyramid Head.

Return to Silent Hill was financed by Davis Films and Ashland Hill Media Finance. It was awarded €1 million from Germany's FFY Bayern media funding program. Unlike the first two Silent Hill films, which were released by Sony Pictures and Open Road Films, Return to Silent Hill was produced independently. Distribution was handled by Cineverse, best known for releasing the horror film Terrifier 3 (2024).

=== Filming ===
Principal photography took place from April 2023 to February 2024. Filming took place in Belgrade and the German cities of Lake Ammer, Munich, Nuremberg, and Penzing. The film was shot over a 50-day schedule across 67 sets, on a comparatively modest budget of approximately $23 million, which Gans stated was possible due to an extensive year-long pre-production period dedicated to storyboarding and design work.

According to Gans, every monster was portrayed by a professional dancer in prosthetic makeup. This also applied to monsters that were intended to be realized through computer-generated imagery, as the use of on-set performers as reference simplified the visual effects process. The visual look was partially inspired by the work of artist Zdzisław Beksiński. Patrick Tatopoulos also worked as a creature designer, who created all his designs as drawn pencil sketches as opposed to using 3D models, which he felt allowed him to work more intuitively and freely. Tatopoulos assisted with the designs of monsters including Red Pyramid and the Abstract Daddy, the latter of which Tatopoulous stated was created "95% through practical effects", by using an animatronic covered in stained linen sheets. Gans stated in a February 2025 interview that he "finished the film 10 days ago" and that it "was supposed to be finished in April 2024, but because of the executive producers, it dragged on and [he] finished it this January".

=== Music ===
Akira Yamaoka, who has scored the vast majority of the Silent Hill game series, composed the music. Music from the original game was used as temp music during editing. In a January 2026 interview, Gans said he would have refused to make the film without Yamaoka's involvement.

== Release ==
In May 2025, Cineverse acquired the U.S. distribution rights. Cineverse's Bloody Disgusting label and frequent collaborator Iconic Events Releasing were added as distribution partners the following month, with the film releasing in the United States on January 23, 2026. Metropolitan Filmexport released the film in France on February 4.

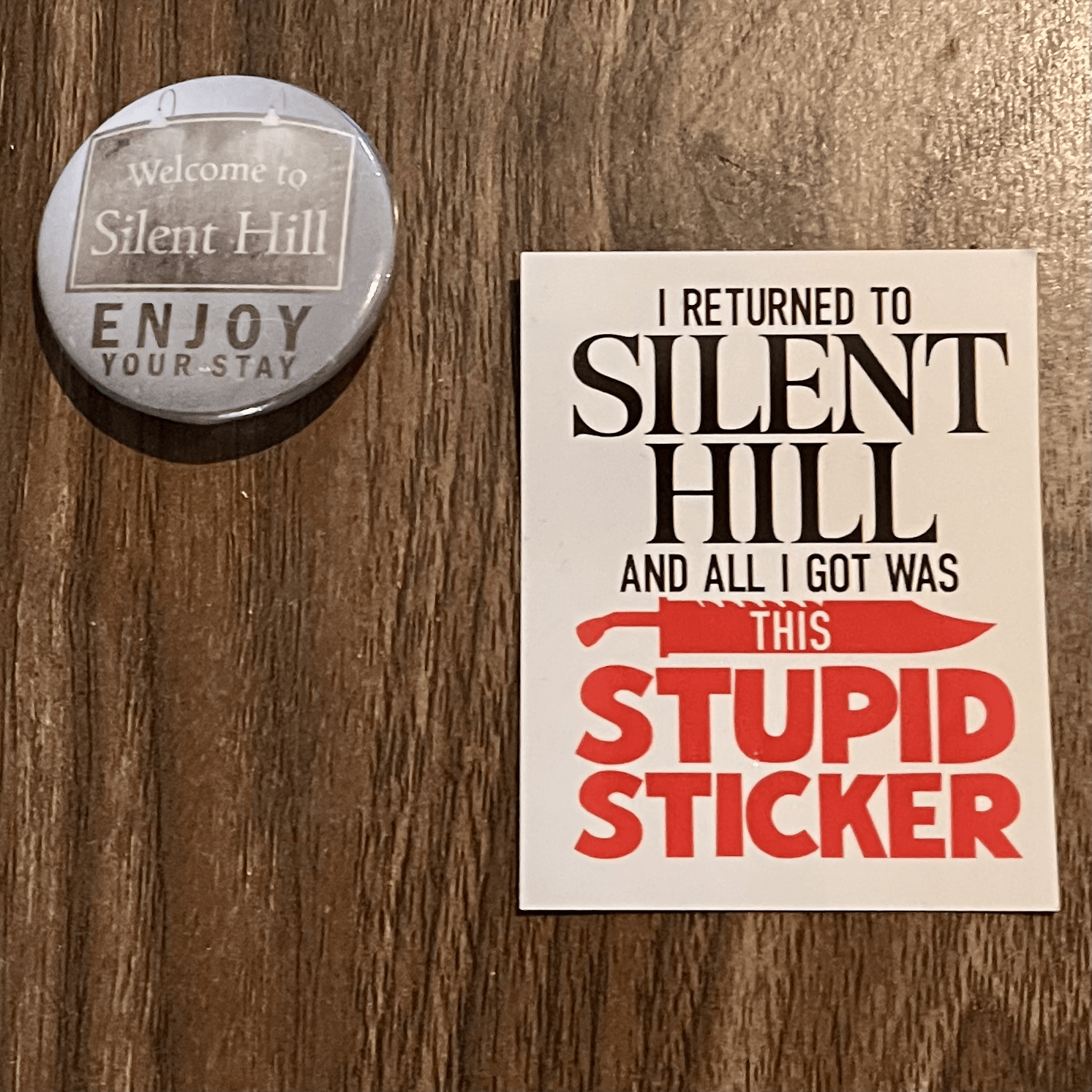
GameStop promotional U.S. rewards

On January 7, 2026, GameStop and Cineverse unveiled a promotional collaboration for the film. Select Gamestop locations in the U.S. allowed fans to visit a store, and access a digital campaign on their phones to receive rewards.

== Reception ==
=== Box office ===
Return to Silent Hill was released on January 23, 2026, in the United States alongside Mercy, Clika, and wide releases of Arco and H Is for Hawk. With many theaters closing down during the weekend due to the January 2026 North American winter storm, it had grossed $2 million in the United States on opening day, and was projected to gross below Avatar: Fire and Ash and Mercy. It reached number 7, earning $3.2 million domestically on opening weekend. Cineverse CEO projected profitability on a reported $3.5 million total investment for distribution rights and marketing, and cited a top-ten opening and strong per-theater average despite a weather-affected weekend; he also argued that polarized reviews would not materially limit the film's home-entertainment prospects because of sustained interest among video game fans. In China, it opened at $9.3 million, with a worldwide opening weekend of $19.3 million. For the next weekend, Variety reported that the film grossed an additional $2.1 million in China "for a $14.3 million cume". The film remained in China's top five during the pre-Lunar New Year Holiday period (6–8 February), adding $1.3 million and bringing its regional total to $17.3 million. The film's worldwide box office total stands at $47.5 million.

=== Critical response ===
Metacritic review
breakdown (unweighted)

Positive
2 (14%)
Mixed
5 (36%)
Negative
7 (50%)

On the review aggregator website Rotten Tomatoes, 18% of 66 critics' reviews are positive, with an average rating of 3.9/10. The website's consensus reads: "A visually tacky sequel that lumbers along with a plodding pulse and lacking the thematic resonance that distinguished its source material, Return to Silent Hill gets lost in the haze." Metacritic, which uses a weighted average, assigned the film a score of 34 out of 100, based on 14 critics, indicating "generally unfavorable" reviews. On AlloCiné, the film received an average rating of 3.0 out of 5, based on 21 reviews from French critics.

== Reboot ==
On September 20, 2026, The Wall Street Journal revealed that Roy Lee, who produced Zach Cregger's Resident Evil (2026), is developing a Silent Hill reboot movie he'll be producing, though its film distributor is yet to be announced.

== See also ==
- List of films based on video games

== Bibliography ==
- This article incorporates material derived from the "Return to Silent Hill" article on the Silent Hill Wiki at Fandom (formerly Wikia) and is licensed under the Creative Commons Attribution-Share Alike 3.0 License (December 2, 2022).
