= Takayoshi Sato =

Japanese video game designer

- Born: Tokyo, Japan
- Education: Tama Art University
- Occupations: CGI creator, video game developer
- Years active: 1996–present
- Employer(s): Konami (1996–2003); Electronic Arts (2003–2007); Virtual Heroes (2007–2011); Nintendo (2012–present)
- Known for: Silent Hill; Silent Hill 2

Takayoshi Sato (Japanese: 佐藤隆善, Hepburn: Satō Takayoshi) is a Japanese video game character designer, writer, and CGI creator. Sato is best known as being a member of Team Silent from 1996 to 2003 and was responsible for creating the CGI cutscenes for Silent Hill and Silent Hill 2.

== Biography ==
Sato was born and raised in Tokyo, Japan. Sato began studying Art at Tama Art University in 1992 and in 1996 received his bachelor's degree in oil painting.

According to Masahiro Ito, after development on Silent Hill 2 wrapped up, Sato was supposed to work on Silent Hill 3 as a character designer and CGI creator, but since the development period was 10 months, it was impossible schedule-wise. He drafted a script for Silent Hill 3 which went unused, before he left Konami in February 2003 following a disagreement concerning his pay on Silent Hill 2. He told in a 2009 interview, "What I was thinking was similar genre, different game. I think I better keep it secret. Who knows there may be a chance to realize the idea some day?"

When Sato started working on serious games, he said, "I feel that games are being standardized into only a few formats lately: FPS, RTS, MMO, 3rd Person Action and Sports. There's a tendency to create the same games over and over with only a visual upgrade. And the only thing artists are supposed to do is "be professional" and gift-wrap the same game elements with a pretty new skin."

In 2011 he received the Advanced Character Animation degree.

Sato has been employed at Nintendo since February 2012 working as a visual producer.

== Works ==
Year	Video game	Role
1996	Sexy Parodius	Designer
1999	Silent Hill	Character Designer, CGI Creator
2001	Silent Hill 2	Character Designer, CGI Creator
2003	Silent Hill 3	Script (unused)
2004	GoldenEye: Rogue Agent	Character Art Director
2005–2007	Tiberium	Producer, Art Director (cancelled)
2009	Fatale	Character Designer and Modeler
2010	Moonbase Alpha	Art Director
2013	Mario and Donkey Kong: Minis on the Move	Visual Producer
2015	Mario vs. Donkey Kong: Tipping Stars	Visual Producer
2015	Mario Tennis: Ultra Smash	Visual Producer
2016	Paper Mario: Color Splash	Visual Producer
2017	Mario Sports: Superstars	Visual Producer
2017	Mario & Luigi: Superstar Saga + Bowser's Minions	Visual Supervisor
2018	Dillon's Dead-Heat Breakers	Visual Producer, Art Director
2018	Mario & Luigi: Bowser's Inside Story + Bowser Jr.'s Journey	Visual Supervisor
2019	Luigi's Mansion 3	Visual Producer
2020	Paper Mario: The Origami King	Visual Producer
2022	Mario Strikers: Battle League	Visual Producer
2023	Metroid Prime: Remastered	Visual Producer
2024	Paper Mario: The Thousand-Year Door	Visual Producer
2025	Metroid Prime 4: Beyond	Visual Producer
