= James Sunderland (Silent Hill) =

Fictional character in Silent Hill 2

- Silent Hill character
- James Sunderland in Silent Hill 2
- First game: Silent Hill 2 (2001)
- Voiced by: English: Guy Cihi (Silent Hill 2); Tomm Hulett (Silent Hill: Shattered Memories); Troy Baker (Silent Hill HD Collection); James Dorton (Dead by Daylight); Luke Roberts (Silent Hill 2 remake); Japanese: Chikahiro Kobayashi (Silent Hill 2 remake)
- Motion capture: Guy Cihi (Silent Hill 2); Luke Roberts (Silent Hill 2 remake)
- Portrayed by: Jeremy Irvine (Return to Silent Hill)

In-universe information
- Spouse: Mary Shepherd-Sunderland (deceased)
- Nationality: American

James Sunderland (Note: Japanese: ジェイムス・サンダーランド, Hepburn: Jēmuzu Sandārando) is a fictional character and the protagonist of the 2001 survival horror video game Silent Hill 2, produced as part of the Silent Hill series under Konami. In the games' events, he arrives to Silent Hill under the apparent request of his deceased wife Mary Shepherd-Sunderland, where he encounters monsters such as Pyramid Head and a few other human characters. He also makes cameo appearances in joke endings of several other games of the series such as Silent Hill 3, Shattered Memories, Downpour, and Book of Memories.

In the 2001 game, he was performed by Guy Cihi in both voice acting and motion capture. James was later voiced by Troy Baker in an optional rerecorded version of the game in Silent Hill HD Collection, which also included the original recordings featuring Cihi. A remake was released in 2024, with Luke Roberts and Chikahiro Kobayashi providing the English and Japanese voice acting, respectively. Roberts performed the motion capture. Jeremy Irvine portrayed the character in the film Return to Silent Hill (2026).

James Sunderland has received critical acclaim from critics, who argued that the game took advantage of framing a seemingly ordinary individual as harboring dark secrets influencing the game's events. Several of them have also praised how the game offers multiple endings about James based on his mental state being influenced by the player's choices and compared his psychological state to several mental illnesses such as obsessive–compulsive disorder (OCD) and post-traumatic stress disorder (PTSD). Roberts has also been praised for his performance, receiving nominations at the British Academy Games Awards, the Golden Joystick Awards, and The Game Awards.

== Appearances ==
James Sunderland was introduced as the protagonist of the 2001 survival horror game Silent Hill 2, developed by the group Team Silent. He is a white widower with blonde hair, wearing an army jacket, gray polo shirt, blue jeans and black Chelsea boots. At age 29 by the time of the game's events, his previous occupation was as a store clerk. Prior to the game's events, he decided to travel to the tourist resort of Silent Hill, located in the American state of Maine, because of a supposed letter from his deceased wife Mary Shepherd-Sunderland.

In the game's events, he read a letter apparently from his deceased wife Mary, who redirected him to go to their "special place" known as "Silent Hill". The town was clouded by a mysterious force called the "Otherworld" that changed its atmosphere and hosts a variety of hostile and grotesque monsters, among them the major antagonist Pyramid Head. He also encountered three human characters, namely Eddie Dombrowski, Angela Orosco, and a young child named Laura. James also met an assertive doppelgänger of Mary named Maria, who eventually served as the final antagonist in most game endings. The game later reveals based on a VHS tape playing at a television that James smothered his dying wife at a hospital bed with a pillow, confirming to the player that James killed his wife. Silent Hill 2 has multiple endings that determine James' fate based on his emotional guilt depending on the player's prior actions, including two joke endings.

James also makes short or cameo appearances in joke "UFO" endings of Silent Hill 3 and Silent Hill: Shattered Memories and the joke "cake" and "spring break" endings of Silent Hill: Downpour and Silent Hill: Book of Memories. In the UFO ending of the 2024 remake of Silent Hill 2, a PS2 version of James Sunderland (replacing the original game's Harry Mason) and an alien kidnap the modern variant of James then take him to a UFO ship. He is additionally referenced in Silent Hill 4: The Room by his father Frank Sunderland, who noted that his son disappeared in Silent Hill years before the game's events. He also makes an appearance in the 2026 film Return to Silent Hill.

== Development ==
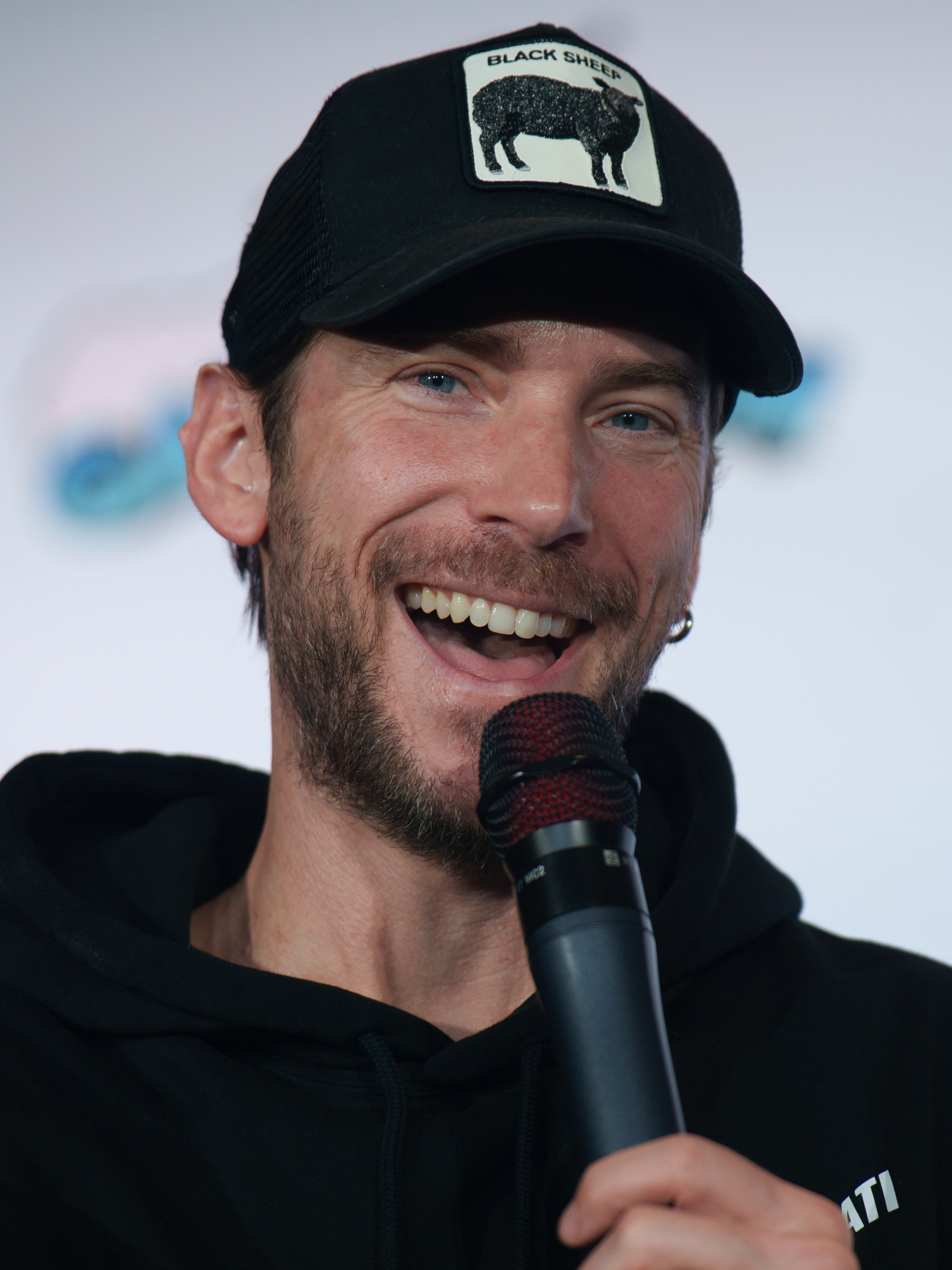
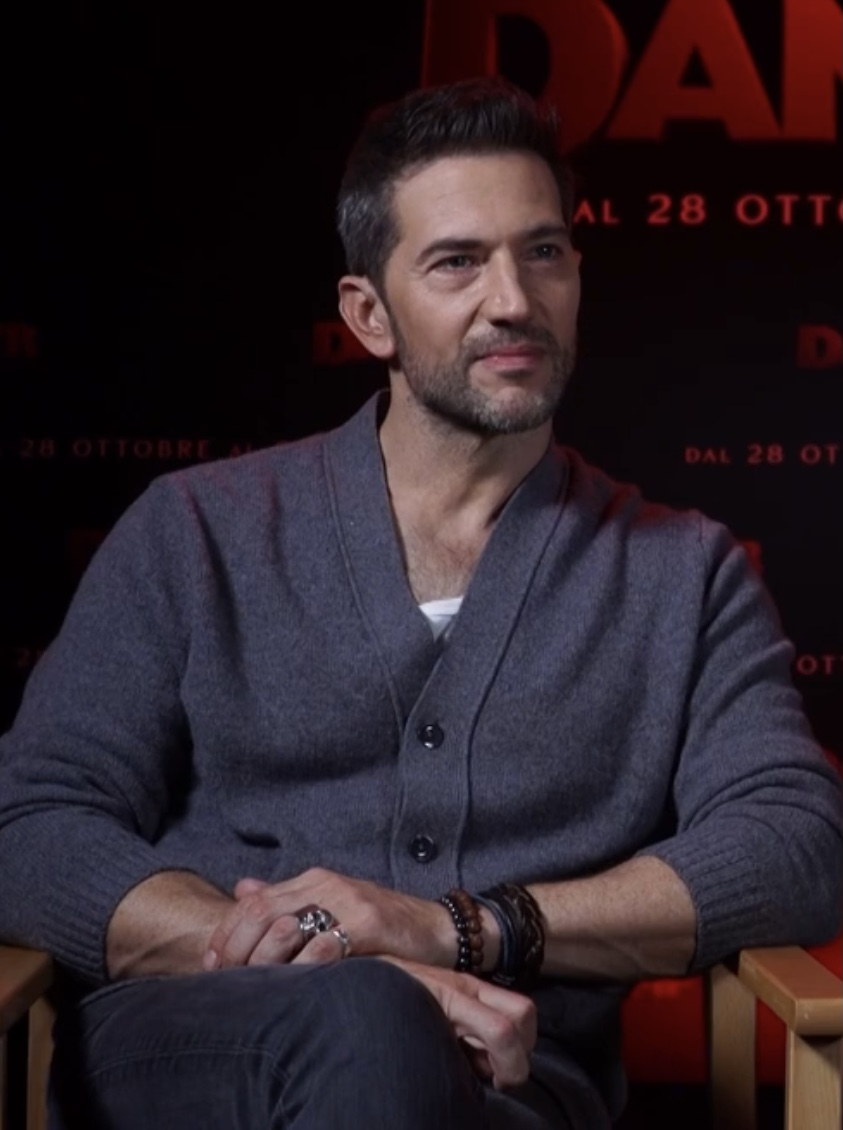
Troy Baker (left) and Luke Roberts (right) have voiced James Sunderland.

According to the creator's commentary, in the early stages of game development, the protagonist had two alternate identities as "Joseph" and "James". The source also stated that the name "Joseph" was chosen based on an individual apparently suspected to have been the unidentified serial killer Jack the Ripper while "James" was referenced as a "derivative" name from "Jack."

In the original Silent Hill 2, James Sunderland was voice acted and motion captured by Guy Cihi. In a 2011 interview, Cihi revealed that he and the other actors were "dialed into" their roles and were guided by their directors; he did not recall being told how he should have specifically sounded, however. He then described the scene development process as typically requiring two to three actors to perform their roles together for motion capture during recordings. Cihi also noted that it was his first time performing for a synchronized motion capture and explained that he and the other actors did not wear costumes but instead equipped tight body suits with nodes. The actor also had to perform different actions that reflected moving, attacking, or dying, noting that his body was sore for weeks after having to perform "dying" movements. He additionally noted that he would have loved to have revisited the role as James Sunderland.

In the 2012 video game compilation Silent Hill HD Collection, Sunderland was voice acted by Troy Baker. The initial announcements that Baker replaced Cihi as the voice actor in the newer version of Silent Hill 2 marked significant controversy among Silent Hill fans, with Inverse remarking that fans never accepted Baker as the new voice actor and calling Konami's actions "seemingly callous with their own series." The controversial voice acting replacement was reportedly due to Cihi refusing to allow Konami to reuse his voice until he was paid residuals for the game compilation. Baker alleged in one interview that Cihi had wrongfully demanded residuals and defended Konami. He additionally said that he voice acted James Sunderland without focusing on how Cihi had previously voiced the character. In a later interview, Baker also attempted to reach out to Cihi to resolve the issue but never got a response, then stating based on his prior work experiences with Konami that the company has never owed people residuals. The issue regarding Konami and Cihi was eventually resolved, leading to the inclusion of the 2001 recordings in Silent Hill HD Collection as an in-game alternate selection.

In the 2024 Silent Hill 2 remake, his appearance was intended to convey the "concept of an ordinary man pushed into extraordinary situations" according to the creative game director Mateusz Lenart of the game development team Bloober Team. Sunderland's voice in the 2024 remake was performed in English by Luke Roberts and in Japanese by Chikahiro Kobayashi. The dialogue for Sunderland and the other characters of the original game were rerecorded by new voice actors into the remake.

== Promotion and reception ==
A collector's statue of James Sunderland was sold under the Japanese brand Gecco. The online survival horror game Dead by Daylight has a cosmetic player skin of James Sunderland.

James Sunderland has received acclaim from publication critics for his characteristics within the wider world of Silent Hill 2. Chris McMullen of The Escapist expressed that the 2001 horror game effectively displayed how the purgatory-like world, filled with "confusion and distress," was shaped by James' mentality and state as an unreliable narrator. Likewise, Game Informer writer Blake Hester felt that James' deteriorated mental health and personal guilt was important in context of the "nonsensical" level design and building architectures and that James' in-game footstep sounds in contrast with the overall silence terrified him. Vice contributor Andy Kelly stated that he was fooled into thinking that James was fooled into being sympathetic for him in an instance of "a cheap trick, but an effective one," that he is "the very definition of an unreliable narrator, and he fooled me. Big time". TheGamer editor Jade King argued that the dark nature and general incompetence of James is evident by Maria's seductive nature and her being constantly killed. She then said that players initially sympathize with him but slowly realize his true nature, that the game is "masterful in how it systematically pulls the wool over our eyes and turns the hero into one of the medium's most despised villains".

The authors of various gaming publications have argued that James Sunderland as a "generic white person" helped to enhance the horrors and story of Silent Hill 2, although opinions on the character himself vary. For instance, Ashley Bardhan from Kotaku compared Sunderland to Ethan Winters from Resident Evil, criticizing both characters for being "bumbling" and "regrettably uninteresting" to the extent that she was unable to find anything about them to care about compared to their missing wives. Mike Druker, who wrote a book analysis for Silent Hill 2, said that the protagonist "is so generic that he could smother his wife with a pillow and never get caught. You know, like he actually did". He noted that James being a "figurative and literal fog" to the point where players lack true understanding over him despite controlling him makes the game's psychological horror aspect "fun" due to its open-ended nature. He continued that James was not an antihero like Kratos of the God of War series but the "perfect villain" because of him being "unassuming, a little boring, and entirely rotting from the inside".

Critics have also written about their appreciations for how Silent Hill 2 allows the player to form their own opinions of Sunderland over time and seal his fate in one of its multiple endings. Academic scholar Ewan Kirkland, writing for the peer-reviewed journal Camera Obscura, stated that James' ambiguous reasons for killing his ill wife has left players speculating on whether he did so out of mercy or for more sinister reasons. Andrea Shearon of TheGamer interpreted James as an unreliable narrator to the point that his surroundings and enemies reveal more about his history than James himself. She was abhorred by the dark nature of James but expressed hope that he was a good person, tying her thoughts into the greater themes of how the player sees James versus how the character and the Silent Hill world both see him. Writer Kimberly Terasaki of The Mary Sue praised the game for allowing the player to ultimately determine James' guilt and fate via its multiple endings. She argued that players may or may not sympathize with Sunderland depending on whether or not they have experienced a similar type of "caregiver burnout" that led him to killing his ill wife, comparing his decisions to that of the movie character Pearl in her namesake 2022 horror movie. Likewise, Den of Geek editor Matthew Byrd felt that the connection between the player's actions and James' mental state was a brilliant game narrative on the grounds of the psychologies of both individuals leading to certain endings. Diego Nicolás Argüello of Endless Mode discussed James' conditional lust for Maria for a game ending where the player has him actively follow her lead, comparing it to the exploitation of lust from lonely people, mostly young men, by social media algorithms.

Bloody Disgusting writer Michael Pementel connected his gameplay experience of Silent Hill 2 with his personal struggles with obsessive–compulsive disorder (OCD). He wrote that he related to James' disconnect from reality and emotional damage from his surrounding world in that his OCD similarly warped his world to the point of belittling himself, fearing that he would hurt others, and feeling that he deserved punishment from his mental illnesses since he was a kid. Because of this, he felt emotionally connected to James in feeling that he was alone in his personal hell. Robert Grosso of TechRaptor published an extensive character analysis of James Sunderland, interpreting his psychological trauma from killing his wife as a form of post-traumatic stress disorder (PTSD) in which Silent Hill 2 is about James grappling with his guilt and trauma personified by the world around him. He claimed that James sought to redeem himself in the town of Silent Hill in some form, hence the game being mainly about his inner conflicts with himself. Grosso said that James "is dynamic, sympathetic, tragic, and remorseful all at the same time – simply put, James is us. He is every human being who has gone through feelings of loss due to a terrible tragedy, dealing with his inner demons twisting his mind and warping his soul".
