= Silent Hill HD Collection =

2012 video game compilation

- North American cover
- Developer: Hijinx Studios
- Publisher: Konami Digital Entertainment
- Producer: Devin Shatsky
- Artist: Mike McAdams
- Series: Silent Hill
- Platforms: PlayStation 3; Xbox 360
- Release: NA: March 20, 2012; JP: March 29, 2012 (PS3); EU: March 30, 2012; AU: April 5, 2012
- Genre: Survival horror
- Mode: Single-player

Silent Hill HD Collection is a 2012 video game compilation of remastered video game ports of Silent Hill 2 (2001) and Silent Hill 3 (2003) developed by Hijinx Studios for the PlayStation 3 and Xbox 360 consoles. Silent Hill 2 centers on widower James Sunderland who travels to the titular town after receiving a letter from his dead wife, while Silent Hill 3 is a direct sequel to the first Silent Hill game and focuses on Heather Mason, a teenager who finds herself in conflict with the town's cult. Both games are categorized as survival horror and share gameplay elements with each other. Published worldwide by Konami Digital Entertainment beginning with North America in March 2012, the compilation features a graphical overhaul, new voice acting, and support for Xbox achievements and PlayStation trophies.

The Silent Hill HD Collection was in development for more than two years. The development team worked with incomplete source code provided by Konami, as the published source code had not been properly archived, resulting in development issues both arising from porting the collection and including those that the original development team had previously encountered. Voice lines were re-recorded for both games, with the option to switch to the original voice acting in Silent Hill 2 only.

Upon release, critics were divided over the Silent Hill HD Collection, particularly in regards to its updated graphics and voice acting. Some enjoyed it as an updated presentation of two favorably regarded games, while others criticized the quality of the compilation, citing the technical issues.

== Background and development ==
The Silent Hill HD Collection, a compilation of the high-definition remastered video game ports of Silent Hill 2 (2001) and Silent Hill 3 (2003), spent more than two years in development. Silent Hill 2 follows widower James Sunderland as he journeys through the fog-shrouded town of Silent Hill after receiving a letter from his dead wife. Silent Hill 3, in contrast, is a direct sequel to the first Silent Hill game, centering on Heather Mason, a teenager who finds herself entangled in a plot to revive an evil god. Both games belong to the survival horror genre and, as such, their gameplay elements overlap. Access to the various environments within the games' worlds is limited, and progression through a particular area or building generally entails finding the relevant keys, which are sometimes obtained after solving a puzzle; puzzles often take the form of riddles and sometimes consist of gathering various items to help solve them. "Health" restoratives and a limited range of weapons and ammunition to fight off various hostile creatures can be obtained. Both games have multiple endings available. The Silent Hill HD Collection features 720p resolution, a 16:9 aspect ratio, a frame rate of 30 frames per second, achievements for Xbox Live, and trophies for PlayStation Network.

A comparison of the original PlayStation 2 version of Silent Hill 2 (right) and its remastered PlayStation 3 port before the patch (left)

Because the original source code for Silent Hill 2 and 3 had not been preserved, the development team at Hijinx Studios had to work with the incomplete code provided by video game publisher Konami, which was not the final code from the games. Thus, the team had to simultaneously handle technical issues arising from porting the two games as well as those which the original development team had previously fixed; some of those problems included Heather turning blue. Furthermore, the team examined game textures that were present in the original games but not seen by the players, and highlighted them in the remaster; among the previously unseen textures and details are scratches on walls and clues to the games' puzzles. Masahiro Ito, the art director for Silent Hill 2 and 3, has speculated that the games' translucent textures, such as those used for the fog, might have proven difficult for the hardware of the PlayStation 3 to handle.

New voice actors were brought in to re-record dialogue from both games, directed by Mary Elizabeth McGlynn, who had previously provided vocals for various soundtracks in the Silent Hill series. Because the games kept the original animations, the voice actors had to sync their vocal performance with the lip motions done by the previous voice actors. Guy Cihi, who had provided the original voice and motion capture for James Sunderland in Silent Hill 2's original release, refused to allow Konami to re-use his voice work in the remaster because he believed that the company owed him residuals for his performance. Troy Baker, the new voice actor for James Sunderland, disputed this, arguing that residuals for voice acting in video games were unheard of in Japan. Eventually, an arrangement between Konami and the original voice actors of Silent Hill 2 was reached to provide an option for the original voice acting on the remastered port of Silent Hill 2; Silent Hill 3, however, did not have that option, with "technical and logistical" difficulties cited.

During the production of the Silent Hill HD Collection, senior associate producer Tomm Hulett was the target of harassment by a small portion of the Silent Hill fanbase, being blamed as the source of everything perceived as wrong in the series, including lost source code, the inclusion of new voice acting in the Silent Hill HD Collection, and that Silent Hill: Book of Memories was a dungeon crawler.

=== Release ===
The compilation was officially announced by Konami at the Electronic Entertainment Expo in 2011, with an expected release date later that fall. Although the game was initially revealed as a PlayStation 3 (PS3) exclusive, Konami later added an Xbox 360 port that would also be published on the same day as the PS3 release. The release date was later pushed back to March 2012, slated to be published alongside two other upcoming installments in the franchise, Silent Hill: Downpour and Silent Hill: Book of Memories. The compilation was published on March 20 in North America, on March 29 in Japan, on March 30 in Europe, and on April 5 in Australia. Only the PS3 edition was published in Japan. A patch to address some of the game's technical issues, including the frame rate, issues with the fog, and audio-syncing, was released for the PS3 edition in July 2012; a patch for the Xbox 360 version was proposed but later canceled in August. The compilation was made backwards compatible for the Xbox One in July 2018.

== Reception ==
Reception

Aggregate score
Aggregator	Score
Metacritic	(PS3) 70/100 (X360) 69/100

Review scores
Publication	Score
AllGame	2/5
Destructoid	3/10
Eurogamer	5/10
Game Informer	8/10
GameRevolution	4/5
GameSpot	7/10
GameTrailers	6/10
IGN	9/10

The Silent Hill HD Collection received "mixed or average" reviews on both consoles, according to rating aggregator Metacritic. Several reviewers voiced their opinion that the title of the collection was misleading, as it actually contained only two games from the franchise and excluded Silent Hill 4: The Room, Silent Hill: Origins and the first Silent Hill game, particularly given that the first two had appeared on the PlayStation 2 console as well. The updated visuals were a point of contention among reviewers: some wrote that the absence of fog in the remastered Silent Hill 2 revealed previously hidden textures and technical limitations of the game to its detriment; the updates to Silent Hill 3, which did not depend on the effects of the fog as much, were generally better received. In contrast, other reviewers enjoyed the updated visuals. Glitches and issues with the frame rate were also noted.

The new voice acting drew a range of responses. Some critics praised it as a general improvement over the originals, while others expressed more mixed feelings about it. Issues with the audio syncing with the character animations was remarked on, and some critics wrote that the subtitles had not been updated to reflect the few changes made to the script. The absence of bonus material drew criticism from some reviewers as well.

Overall, opinions on the compilation were mixed. Some enjoyed it as a nicely updated port of two well-regarded games, while others recommended it despite technical faults. Other reviewers wrote that the quality of the compilation was lacking, especially in comparison to other recently released remastered compilations, such as the Metal Gear Solid HD Collection.
