= James Sunderland =

James Sunderland may refer to:

- James Sunderland (politician) (born 1970), British Conservative Party politician
- James Sunderland (Silent Hill), central character of the video game Silent Hill 2
