= Silent Hill 2 =

2001 video game

- North American cover art, featuring the character Angela Orosco
- Developer: Team Silent (Note: Team Silent was a group in Konami Computer Entertainment Tokyo. Ported to Windows by Creature Labs.)
- Publisher: Konami
- Director: Masashi Tsuboyama
- Producer: Akihiro Imamura
- Artist: Masahiro Ito
- Writer: Hiroyuki Owaku
- Composer: Akira Yamaoka
- Series: Silent Hill
- Platforms: PlayStation 2; Xbox; Windows
- Release: September 25, 2001: PlayStation 2; NA: September 25, 2001; JP: September 27, 2001; EU: November 23, 2001 Xbox; NA: December 18, 2001; JP: February 22, 2002; EU: October 4, 2002 Windows; NA: December 2, 2002; EU: February 28, 2003
- Genre: Survival horror
- Mode: Single-player

Silent Hill 2 (Note: Japanese: サイレントヒル 2, Hepburn: Sairento Hiru Tsū) is a 2001 survival horror video game developed by Konami's Team Silent and published by Konami for the PlayStation 2. The second installment in the Silent Hill series, Silent Hill 2 centers on James Sunderland, a widower who journeys to the town of Silent Hill after receiving a letter from his dead wife. An extended version containing a bonus scenario, Born from a Wish, and other additions was published for Xbox in December of the same year. In 2002, it was ported to Windows and re-released for the PlayStation 2 as a Greatest Hits version, which includes all bonus content from the Xbox port. A remastered high-definition version was released for the PlayStation 3 and Xbox 360 in 2012 as part of the Silent Hill HD Collection.

Development of Silent Hill 2 began in June 1999, soon after Silent Hill had been completed. Its narrative was inspired by the Russian novel Crime and Punishment (1866) by Fyodor Dostoevsky, and some of the influences on the game's artistic style include the works of film director David Lynch and paintings by Francis Bacon and Andrew Wyeth; cultural references to history, films and literature can be found in the game. In contrast with the previous title, whose narrative concerned cult activity, Silent Hill 2 focuses directly on the psychology of its characters.

In North America, Japan, and Europe, over 1.3 million copies of Silent Hill 2 were sold, with the greatest number of sales in North America. Critics praised its psychological horror story, use of symbolism and taboo topics, atmosphere, graphics, monster designs, soundtrack, sound design, and emotional depth. It is regarded as one of the best video games of all time, and a key example of video games as an art form. The game was followed by Silent Hill 3 in 2003. A remake developed by Bloober Team was released on October 8, 2024, for the PlayStation 5 and Windows. Its plot was loosely adapted into the 2026 film Return to Silent Hill

== Gameplay ==
James preparing to fight a monster

The objective of Silent Hill 2 is to guide the player character, James Sunderland, through the monster-filled town of Silent Hill as he searches for his deceased wife. The game features a third-person view, with various camera angles. The default control for Silent Hill 2 has James moving in the direction that he is facing when the player tilts the analog stick upwards, although players can choose a more traditional control scheme. Silent Hill 2 does not use a heads-up display; to check James' health, location, and items, the player must enter the pause-game menu to review his status. Throughout the game, James collects maps, which can only be read if there is sufficient light or when his flashlight is on. He also updates relevant maps to reflect locked doors, clues, and obstructions, and writes down the content of all documents for future reference. Maps are not essential to proceed through the game, but they give players a significant advantage when exploring the world of Silent Hill 2.

Much of the gameplay consists of navigating the town and finding keys or other items to bypass doors or other obstructions, with less focus on killing enemies. Occasionally, puzzles will be presented, often with riddles left for the player to interpret. The difficulty levels of the enemies and the puzzles are determined independently by the player before starting the game. James keeps a radio with him, which alerts him to the presence of creatures by emitting static, allowing him to detect them even through the thick fog or darkness. Similar to the first game, the player can choose to turn off the radio if they want. He also tilts his head in the direction of a nearby item or monster, giving clues to items that the player may miss while playing. For combat, he finds three melee weapons and three firearms throughout the game, with another two melee weapons unlocked during replays. James can move and shoot while equipped with a handgun, but he cannot move and shoot with a shotgun or rifle. James cannot aim up or down and the player will have to rely on the game's auto-aim to hit enemies that are on the ceiling. "Health" restoratives and ammunition can be found throughout the game.

== Plot ==
=== Setting ===
While not focusing on the characters and plot threads of the first Silent Hill game, Silent Hill 2 takes place in the series' namesake town, located in Maine. Silent Hill 2 is set in another area of the town, and explores some of Silent Hill's backstory. As opposed to the first game where the monsters and environments were a real manifestation, and everybody could see what was happening, this time the town draws upon the psyche of its visitors and ultimately forms alternative versions of itself, which differs depending on the character; thus, Silent Hill 2 acts as more of an internal representation of a person's guilt or demons. (Note: This can be seen prominently with James, who experiences a version of the town influenced by his guilt and delusions for the majority of the game. His version of the town fades as he comes to terms with his guilt and responsibility for his actions. For example, the hotel transforms from being just as it was three years ago, to its true form of a mostly burned-out structure. Meanwhile, since the character of Laura is young and innocent, she does not see any monsters or otherworldly versions of Silent Hill, and can freely move around as if nothing is wrong. Furthermore, only Laura perceives the town as normal because she is not burdened with guilt or past misdeeds; to her, neither the monsters nor Maria exist.) The concept behind the town was "a small, rural town in America"; to make the setting more realistic, some buildings and rooms lack furnishings.

=== Storylines ===
The game's main storyline follows a character named James Sunderland. Later editions of the game include a second storyline titled "Born from a Wish", which follows a character named Maria. In editions that include "Born from a Wish", the original storyline is titled "Letter from Silent Heaven".

==== Letter from Silent Heaven ====
James Sunderland (Guy Cihi) arrives in the town of Silent Hill after receiving a letter from his late wife Mary (Monica Taylor Horgan), who died three years previously from an unspecified illness. The letter mentions their vacation in Silent Hill before her death, and says she is waiting for him in their "special place". While exploring the town, which at first seems abandoned, he encounters a range of distorted, humanoid monsters, and three other people: Angela Orosco (Donna Burke), a 19-year-old girl searching for her mother who warns him there is "something wrong" with the town; Eddie Dombrowski (David Schaufele), an overweight young man seemingly on the run; and Laura (Jacquelyn Breckenridge), a bratty eight-year-old orphan who knew Mary but seems to dislike James. While making his way through an apartment complex, he also runs into a seemingly unkillable being with a huge, triangular helmet and knife, known as Pyramid Head. While searching a local park, James meets Maria (Horgan), a woman who strongly resembles Mary, but with a more colourful and erotic personality and appearance. Maria claims that she has never met or seen Mary, and because she is frightened by the monsters, James allows her to follow him. Arriving at a bowling alley, Eddie and Laura are found inside, but Laura runs off.

At Maria's insistence, they follow Laura to a hospital. James and Maria are separated, but James eventually locates Laura. Under the pretence of retrieving a letter from Mary, Laura locks him in a room with several grotesque monsters. After killing them, James finds the hospital has changed to a twisted, nightmarish version of itself. He finds Maria, but they are ambushed by Pyramid Head, and she is killed while James escapes. Afterwards, James resolves to search the hotel that he and Mary stayed at during their vacation. On the way, he detours through the town's Historical Society building. He discovers a labyrinthine maze of tunnels within the building connecting to an old Civil War prison, and finds images of POWs being executed by red-hooded cultists strongly resembling Pyramid Head. He is astonished to find Maria alive and unharmed in a locked cell. She remembers their previous encounter differently, and mentions details of James' and Mary's past that only Mary would know, such as the videotape they made during their vacation in Silent Hill. James sets off to find a way to free Maria but returns to find her dead again. Later on, he rescues Angela from a monster, after which she reveals that her father had sexually abused her as a child; a nearby newspaper clipping implies that she killed her father before coming to Silent Hill. Angela confronts James about his wife, accusing him of not loving her. At the end of the labyrinth, James re-encounters Eddie, who admits to maiming a bully and killing a dog before fleeing to Silent Hill. After a poorly worded question, Eddie attacks him. James is forced to kill him in self-defense, disturbed by the fact that he has killed a human being.

Arriving at the hotel, James finds Laura, who explains that she met Mary at the hospital the previous year, and gives him the letter from Mary confirming this. Continuing his search, he locates the videotape Maria mentioned. Instead of showing their vacation in the town, however, it instead depicts him killing his dying wife by smothering her with a pillow. He finally realises that there was no letter from Mary, and his tormented mind, unable to live with the guilt, repressed the memory of her murder, inventing the story of her waiting for him in Silent Hill in an attempt to escape the truth of what he'd done. In another room, a final meeting in a burning staircase with Angela sees her giving up on life, unable to cope with her trauma. She thanks James for saving her but wishes that he hadn't, as she feels she deserved the abuse she endured as a child. She then walks into the fire and is never seen again, commenting the flames around her were all she ever saw. Afterwards, James encounters two Pyramid Heads, along with Maria, who is slain before his eyes once again. He comes to realize that Pyramid Head was created from his need to be punished for his sins, and the monsters are nothing but the town manifesting the thoughts, memories, insecurities and fears embedded in his damaged psyche. The envelope from Mary disappears, and both Pyramid Heads, no longer needed now that James has finally accepted the truth, commit suicide. James heads to the hotel's rooftop, and depending on choices made by the player throughout the game, he encounters either Mary or Maria disguised as her.

Silent Hill 2 features six endings; Konami has kept their canonicity ambiguous. In "Leave", James has one last meeting with Mary, reads her letter, and leaves the town with Laura. "In Water" sees James commit suicide by driving into Lake Toluca with Mary's body in the car. The "Maria" ending sees Mary as the woman on the rooftop, who has not forgiven James for killing her; after her defeat, James dismisses her as a hallucination and then leaves the town with Maria, who briefly coughs, suggesting she will become sick just as Mary did, and the cycle will repeat. The other three endings are only available in replay games, including "Rebirth", in which James plans to resurrect Mary using arcane objects collected throughout the game, and two joke endings: "Dog", where James discovers that a Shiba Inu has been controlling all the events of the game, and "UFO", where James is abducted by extraterrestrials with the help of the first game's protagonist, Harry Mason.

==== Born from a Wish ====
Born from a Wish is a side-story scenario in the special editions and re-releases of the game in which the player takes control of Maria shortly before she and James meet at Silent Hill. After waking up in the town with a gun and contemplating suicide, she decides to try to find someone. She eventually encounters a local mansion, where she hears the voice of its owner, Ernest Baldwin (Ward Sexton). Ernest refuses to let Maria into the room he is in and will only talk to her through its closed door. After Maria completes tasks for him, Ernest warns her about James, whom he describes as a "bad man". After Maria opens the door to Ernest's room and finds it empty, she leaves the mansion. After the scenario, Maria contemplates suicide once more but ultimately resolves to find James. The side-story concludes with a voice-over of James encountering Maria in the park and her introducing herself to him, as it happens during the events of the main story.

== Analysis ==
Some of the more apparent themes of the narrative are grief, guilt, and punishment. Other noticeable themes in Silent Hill 2 are mental illness, lust, love and abuse, including an exploration of how it affects people.

A prominent focus of analysis is the symbolism of the monsters present in the game, which seem to be manifested from James' guilty consciousness. One major example is Pyramid Head, a tall, masculine, faceless humanoid figure, whose head is concealed by a large pyramid-shaped helmet that is made of rusted iron. Pyramid Head wields a large blade called the "Great Knife", which he drags across the floor in several encounters with the player. His design not only serves to psychologically frighten the player, as the sharp edges of the triangular head were intentionally illustrated to "suggest the possibility of pain" according to his creator Masahiro Ito, but it is also emblematic of many of the themes of the narrative, as his appearance and behaviour represent the guilt that James experienced, the retribution he seeks for his actions, and the sexual frustration that he felt while his late wife, Mary, was terminally ill.

== Development ==
=== Influences and design ===
"Bubble Head Nurses" (pictured) and "Mannequins" (creatures composed of only two pairs of female legs) were designed to be sexually suggestive, and a reflection of James' subconscious sexual desires during Mary's hospitalization.

Development of Silent Hill 2 began in June 1999, directly after the completion of its predecessor, and lasted a little over two years. The game was created by Team Silent, a production group within Konami Computer Entertainment Tokyo. The story was conceived by CGI director Takayoshi Sato, who based it on Russian author Fyodor Dostoevsky's novel Crime and Punishment (1866), with individual members of the team collaborating on the actual scenario. The main writing was done by Hiroyuki Owaku and Sato, who provided the dialogue for the female characters. Around the time Silent Hill 2 was in production, the average budget for video game production has been estimated to be around US$7–10 million by Sato. The decision to produce a sequel to Silent Hill was partly a financial one, as it had been commercially successful, and partly a creative one, as the team had faced difficulties while working on the original game. The team was given a small window to settle on a platform. As it was unable to gather information on the then-unannounced GameCube and Xbox consoles, they began production of the game for the PlayStation 2. Producer Akihiro Imamura stated that the decision was also influenced by "a wish from the business section that we move rapidly on the PS2. You know, it is currently the market focus". Imamura read all comments about the original game and kept them in mind while working on Silent Hill 2. He estimated that a total of fifty people worked on the game: while the creative team from the first game remained, they had to bring in thirty people from Konami Computer Entertainment Tokyo. Developed at the same time, the PlayStation 2 version of Silent Hill 2 and its Xbox port debuted at the March 2001 Tokyo Game Show to positive reactions.

Silent Hill 2 shared the same atmosphere of psychological horror as the first Silent Hill game. As the developers already had a rough sense of the game's environment, they focused on its plot first, in contrast to the process used with the first game. The PlayStation 2 hardware allowed the developers to create improved fog and shadow special effects. For example, as a monster approaches the player character, its shadow cast on the wall by the flashlight grows. When dealing with the game's camera angles, the team struggled with a balance between those that stayed true to the creative vision and those that did not hamper gameplay. Psychological elements, such as the gradual disappearance of Mary's letter and symbolic holes, were incorporated into the game. The team wanted Silent Hill 2's protagonist to "reflect [the] evil", against which the protagonist of the first game battles.

For the game's artistic style, the team drew on a variety of influences: the work of film directors David Cronenberg, David Fincher, David Lynch (Note: Ito specifically cited Lost Highway (1997) as an inspiration, which at one time led the team to consider multiple protagonists for the game.) and Alfred Hitchcock, along with the 1990 psychological thriller/horror film Jacob's Ladder, and other similar films, as well as painters such as Francis Bacon, Rembrandt and Andrew Wyeth. Early in the project, they studied the 1996 video game Tomb Raider's creation of 3D environments. Other influences on the game included Madonna's 1999 music video for "Nothing Really Matters", the 1992 survival horror video game Alone in the Dark, the first Silent Hill game, and Japanese comics by Daijiro Morohoshi and Junji Ito. While working on the character designs, Sato and his team sketched human faces and various expressions. To gain a better sense of the characters' facial structures, they drew the characters' profiles from various angles, before creating wire-frame models, each consisting of six thousand polygons; they then completed the model with textures. Data for the character animation was taken through motion capture, and using Softimage, they animated the characters. Masahiro Ito designed the monsters in Silent Hill 2; "soured flesh" was the concept behind their appearance. The monsters were also to incorporate "an element of humanity". For the most part, the monsters reflect the protagonist's subconscious. For example, the monster Pyramid Head was based on the executioners of the town's fictional history and is intended to be a punisher for James. An exception to this theme is the "Creepers", which are also seen in the first game.

Silent Hill 2 also incorporates some references to real-life events. In the original scenario, the developers designed Maria and James with dual personalities: Maria's other personality was "Mary", a reference to Mary Jane Kelly, Jack the Ripper's last victim, while James' was "Joseph", a reference to one of the Jack the Ripper suspects. Eddie Dombrowski's name was taken from actor Eddie Murphy during the beginning phases of production when Eddie was originally designed with a pleasantly optimistic personality. The name of Angela Orosco was derived from Angela Bennett, the name of the protagonist in the 1995 film The Net, and Laura's from the 1970 novel No Language But a Cry by Richard D'Ambrosio. The developers satirized the perceived accessibility of firearms in the U.S. by allowing James to find a handgun in a shopping cart. There are also indications that the layout of Silent Hill was based to a certain extent on the town of San Bruno, California.

=== Sound ===
Silent Hill 2 Original Soundtracks

Soundtrack album by Akira Yamaoka
- Released: October 3, 2001
- Genres: Dark ambient; industrial; Trip hop; alternative rock; video game soundtrack
- Length: 74:15
- Label: King Records

Professional ratings
Review scores
Source	Rating
AllMusic	4.5/5 stars

Akira Yamaoka composed the music for Silent Hill 2. At his home, Yamaoka took three days to write the music for "Theme of Laura", Silent Hill 2's main theme, by combining "a sad melody" and "a strong beat", although he does not consider the melody to be the "most important" element of a musical piece. He wanted the music to evoke emotions in the player. Silent Hill 2 makes extensive use of sound effects ranging from screams to footsteps on broken glass. In charge of the game's fifty sound effects, Yamaoka wanted to surprise the player with different sounds and create an unsettling environment. He also incorporated occasional silence, commenting that "selecting moments of silence is another way of producing sound".

Konami published Silent Hill 2 Original Soundtracks in Japan on October 3, 2001. Eight tracks ("Theme of Laura", "Null Moon", "Love Psalm", "True", "Promise", "Fermata in Mistic Air", "Laura Plays the Piano" and "Overdose Delusion") appeared in the 2006 PlayStation Portable release The Silent Hill Experience. At the 2006 Play! A Video Game Symphony concert in Chicago, Illinois, Yamaoka performed music from the series, including "Theme of Laura", with a full-size orchestra. In 2019, the soundtrack was re-released on vinyl by Mondo, who previously gave the same treatment to the soundtrack of Silent Hill in 2016.

== Release ==
Silent Hill 2 was first released for the PlayStation 2 in North America on September 25, 2001, in Japan on September 27 and in Europe on November 23. The original European edition also included a second disc: a "Making-of" DVD video featuring trailers, an artwork gallery and a documentary on the game's development.

An extended version of the game was published for Xbox in North America on December 18, 2001, Japan on February 22, 2002, and Europe on October 14. Each region had different subtitles for the game: Saigo no Uta (最期の詩; lit. "Poem of the Last Moment") in Japan, Restless Dreams in North America and Inner Fears in Europe. This edition contained the short bonus scenario Born from a Wish and other minor enhancements. This revised version was ported back to the PlayStation 2 and subtitled Director's Cut in Europe, but was not subtitled in North America, and was simply released under the "Greatest Hits" banner. Creature Labs ported this edition to Windows, which Konami released in December 2002. Added features in the PC version include the ability to quicksave and watch trailers for Silent Hill 3.

In 2006, Konami re-released Silent Hill 2 with its indirect PS2 sequels, Silent Hill 3 and Silent Hill 4: The Room, in a bundle entitled The Silent Hill Collection in Europe and Japan.

=== Other versions ===
Silent Hill HD Collection, a compilation of remastered high-definition editions of Silent Hill 2 and 3, was released for the PlayStation 3 and the Xbox 360 on March 20, 2012. It contains new voice actors for the characters of both games, along with the option in Silent Hill 2 to listen to the original cast.

In October 2015, Konami Japan and TAKASAGO released a Pachislot for casinos, Pachislot Silent Hill, based on the second game. James' fate in battle is decided according to the result obtained in a roulette. It also features bonus modes where players must defend themselves from enemies, including a new monster called Chariot.

In 2018, the Enhanced Edition mod was released for the PC version. It adds higher resolution, high framerate (60FPS) and widescreen support, and audio and bug fixes.

== Reception ==
Reception

Aggregate score
Aggregator	Score
Metacritic	89/100 (PS2); 84/100 (Xbox); 70/100 (PC)

Review scores
Publication	Score
AllGame	3.5/5
Eurogamer	9/10 (PS2); 9/10 (Xbox)
Famitsu	9/10, 8/10, 8/10, 9/10 (PS2); 8/10, 8/10, 8/10, 8/10 (Xbox)
Game Informer	8.25/10
GameSpot	7.7/10 (PS2); 7.9/10 (Xbox); 6.2/10 (PC)
GameSpy	96/100 (PS2); 86/100 (PC)
IGN	9/10 (PS2); 8.4/10 (PC)
Next Generation	4/5 (PS2); 4/5 (Xbox)

Award
Publication	Award
IGN	Editor's Choice (PS2)

Silent Hill 2 sold over 1.3 million copies since its release in North America, Japan and Europe, with the most units sold in North America. The game has received praise from video game journalists. Rating aggregation site Metacritic shows "generally favorable reviews", with an average rating of 89 out of 100 for the PS2 version and 84 out of 100 for the Xbox version. The PC port received "mixed or average reviews", with a Metacritic score of 70 out of 100. Jeff Lundrigan reviewed the PlayStation 2 version of the game for Next Generation, rating it four stars out of five, and stated that "it's not for the faint of heart, nor anyone looking for fast action, but those who enjoy a good shiver won't be disappointed". Andy Greenwald of Spin magazine praised it as a frightening but "restrained" game. Jon Thompson of AllGame stated: "Silent Hill 2 feels a bit rushed, and although it might not live up to the dizzying horror of the first game, it packs enough of its own punch to make it a worthy sequel." IGN's Doug Perry wrote: "It's frightening, deep, clever, and tries to improve the genre, if just a little, and in the end, that's all I really want in a survival horror game." Joe Fielder of GameSpot concluded, "Silent Hill 2 is a much prettier, somewhat smarter but less a compelling game than the original."

The graphics and atmosphere of Silent Hill 2 were praised by reviewers, who highlighted the smooth transitions from computer-generated (CG) to in-game cutscenes and the sense of claustrophobia caused by the fog. On the other hand, Thompson felt that the grainy image effects and dense fog hid the details of the environment, while Fielder wrote that the exterior environments "rarely push the PlayStation 2's graphical capabilities". Character animation was considered realistic by reviewers, though James' animation in the CG sometimes appeared "marionette"-like, according to Perry. The voice acting garnered mixed responses from reviewers divided over whether it was well done with an improved script, or hampered by the script. Reviewers enjoyed the monster designs, although some found the monsters less frightening due to the abundance of ammunition, and being easily avoided. Reviewers found the camera, though improved, still difficult when battling monsters which hung from the ceiling—concerns echoed by reviewers of the PC version. The soundtrack and sound effects were considered by reviewers to be effective in creating suspense, though Thompson considered them sometimes "a bit forced and contrived". The puzzles were generally seen as not overly challenging by reviewers, though Thompson found them generally easy and GameSpy's David Hodgeson wrote that they were sometimes illogical. Less well-received was the combat, criticized for its lack of challenge and easily defeated monsters and bosses.

Reactions to the Xbox port were also positive. Reviewers have written that the PlayStation 2 and Xbox versions were mostly similar, except for the Born from a Wish side-scenario found in the Xbox version. Eurogamer's Kristan Reed called Born from a Wish "more like a demo than anything", while Fielder described it as "a commendable extra". Both felt that it could be completed in around an hour and did not add much to the game. The PC port, in contrast, received mixed reactions. Allen Rausch of GameSpy considered the PC port overall to be "[a] fantastic translation of Konami's stylish and scary survival-horror game". IGN's Ivan Sulic advised against playing the game with the keyboard, and rated the game "great". Conversely, Ron Dulin, another reviewer for GameSpot, wrote: "Not even the game's foggy atmosphere is thick enough to hide Silent Hill 2's problems". Next Generation reviewed the Xbox version of the game, rating it four stars out of five, and stated that "exactly the same disturbing yet wildly enjoyable game as it was on PS2" and noted the sub-game called "Born From a Wish" saying "if you've already played this on PS2 there's no particular reason to pick it up again. On the other hand, if you haven't (and why haven't you?), then this added bonus would make the Xbox version the one to buy."

== Legacy ==
Silent Hill 2 is often considered to be one of the best horror games and one of the best video games of all time. According to GameSpot, "critics have championed" the game as a key example of video games as an art form. In Replay: The History of Video Games (2010), Tristian Donovan described Silent Hill 2 as the "high point" of the series. In a retrospective article on the survival horror genre, IGN writer James Stephanie Sterling praised the game's plot as "one of the finest examples of narrative construction in gaming to this day". Fellow IGN writer Travis Fahs credited the game as a factor in the "short-lived period of renewed interest in horror games".

It ranked first on X-Play's list of the scariest games of all time in 2006. In 2009, IGN listed it as one of the five best horror video games created after 2000, and one of the twelve greatest PlayStation 2 games of all time. It ranked again in IGN's list of the top 100 PS2 games, and again in 2018, on IGN's list of the 100 greatest video games ever made. In a retrospective by GamePro, it was the 26th best game for the PS2. In 2008, GamesRadar placed it on its list of the 15 best "video game stories" ever, describing it as "a punishing tale not easily matched". In 2009, Wired News listed it as the 11th most influential game of the decade for its emphasis on psychological horror and exploration of taboo topics such as incest and domestic abuse, rather than gore. In 2012, a top video games of all-time list by G4 television network ranked the game in 85th place. That same year, the game's narrative was ranked first on GamesRadar's list of the best video game stories ever. Game Informer named Silent Hill 2 the best of the Silent Hill franchise and listed it as the second best horror game of all time in its October 2014 issue, and number eight on GameTrailers's Top Ten Twos list of the best second franchise games in 2015.

== Adaptations ==
=== Remake ===
A remake was announced on October 19, 2022, during the Silent Hill Transmission event. Developed by Bloober Team with contributions by original Silent Hill 2 artist Masahiro Ito and composer Akira Yamaoka, it was released for the PlayStation 5 and Windows on October 8, 2024.

=== Film adaptation ===
A film adaptation of Silent Hill 2, titled Return to Silent Hill, was released on January 23, 2026, by Cineverse. It is the third adaptation and a reboot of the Silent Hill film series. Directed by Christophe Gans, who directed the first adaptation of the original Silent Hill video game, it starred Jeremy Irvine as James Sunderland, Hannah Emily Anderson as Mary, Maria and Angela, Evie Templeton as Laura, and Pearse Egan as Eddie.
