= Christophe Gans =

French film director (born 1960)

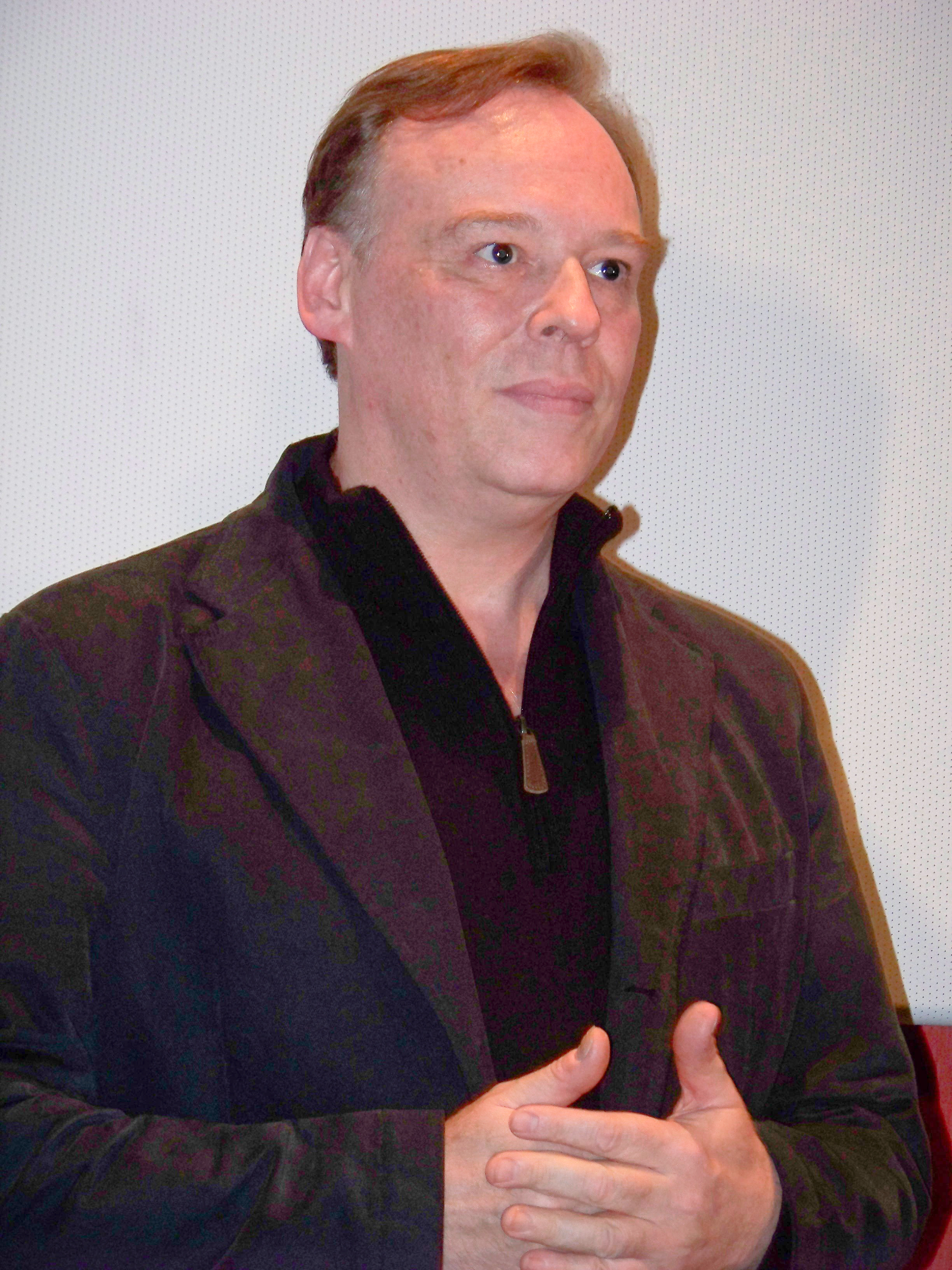
- Gans in 2010
- Born: Christophe Gans; 11 March 1960 (age 66); Antibes, France
- Occupations: Film director, producer; screenwriter
- Years active: 1981–present

Christophe Gans (born 11 March 1960) is a French film director, producer, and screenwriter who specializes in horror and fantasy movies.

== Life and career ==
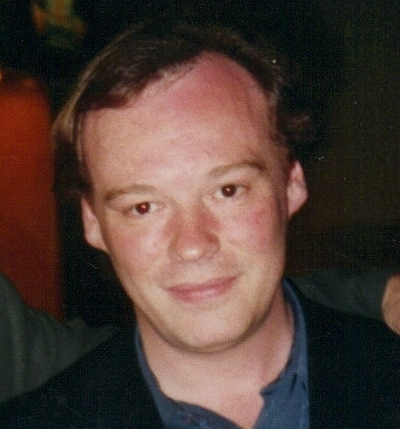
Gans in 1996

Christophe Gans went to film school Institut des hautes études cinématographiques (IDHEC) and graduated in the early 1980s. Following graduation he founded Starfix magazine. He then went as a journalist to California, without a work permit and shot a part for the anthology film Necronomicon (1993). This was followed by feature-length works Crying Freeman (1995) and later Brotherhood of the Wolf (2001).

His $29 million-budgeted film Brotherhood of the Wolf was a worldwide success, grossing over $70 million in theaters worldwide. It became the sixth-highest-grossing French-language film of all time in the United States, After the film's success, many producers approached Gans to work on very similar projects to appeal to young audience.

He went on to direct 2006's cinematic adaptation of the video game Silent Hill, as well as the 2014 fantasy film, Beauty and the Beast. Gans has also appeared in films as an actor, as he portrayed himself in the 2016 mockumentary Fury of the Demon.

Gans was to write and direct an adaptation of the Capcom video game Onimusha; however, after several setbacks he abandoned it was later attached to the French film Fantômas. Vincent Cassel later dropped out of the project which went unmade. He initially was to direct a sequel to Silent Hill, but later pulled out and was replaced by M. J. Bassett. Gans was developing a new live action Corto Maltese film for release in 2020. It was to star Tom Hughes and Milla Jovovich. However, it was cancelled due to legal problems. In January 2020, Gans expressed an interest in directing new Silent Hill and Fatal Frame films, stating that he is developing a screenplay for the former.

In 2022, in an interview with French gaming website Jeuxvideo.com, Gans confirmed that he had completed a script for a third Silent Hill film, and is aiming for a 2023 release for the project. He later reiterated this in an interview with JeuxActu, and elaborated that the third film project is to be part of what will be a 'relaunch' of the Silent Hill brand, accompanied by new video games. In October 2022, it was announced that the film would be called Return to Silent Hill and would be based on Silent Hill 2.

== Filmography ==
Short film

| Year | Title | Director | Writer | Notes |
|---|---|---|---|---|
| 1981 | Silver Slime | Yes | Yes | |
| 1993 | The Drowned | Yes | Yes | Segment of Necronomicon |

Feature film

| Year | Title | Director | Writer | Notes |
|---|---|---|---|---|
| 1995 | Crying Freeman | Yes | Yes | Also fight choreographer |
| 2001 | Brotherhood of the Wolf | Yes | Yes | |
| 2006 | Silent Hill | Yes | No | |
| 2014 | Beauty and the Beast | Yes | Yes | |
| 2026 | Return to Silent Hill | Yes | Yes | |

Producer

- Saint Ange (2004)
