= Luke Roberts (actor) =

British-Canadian actor

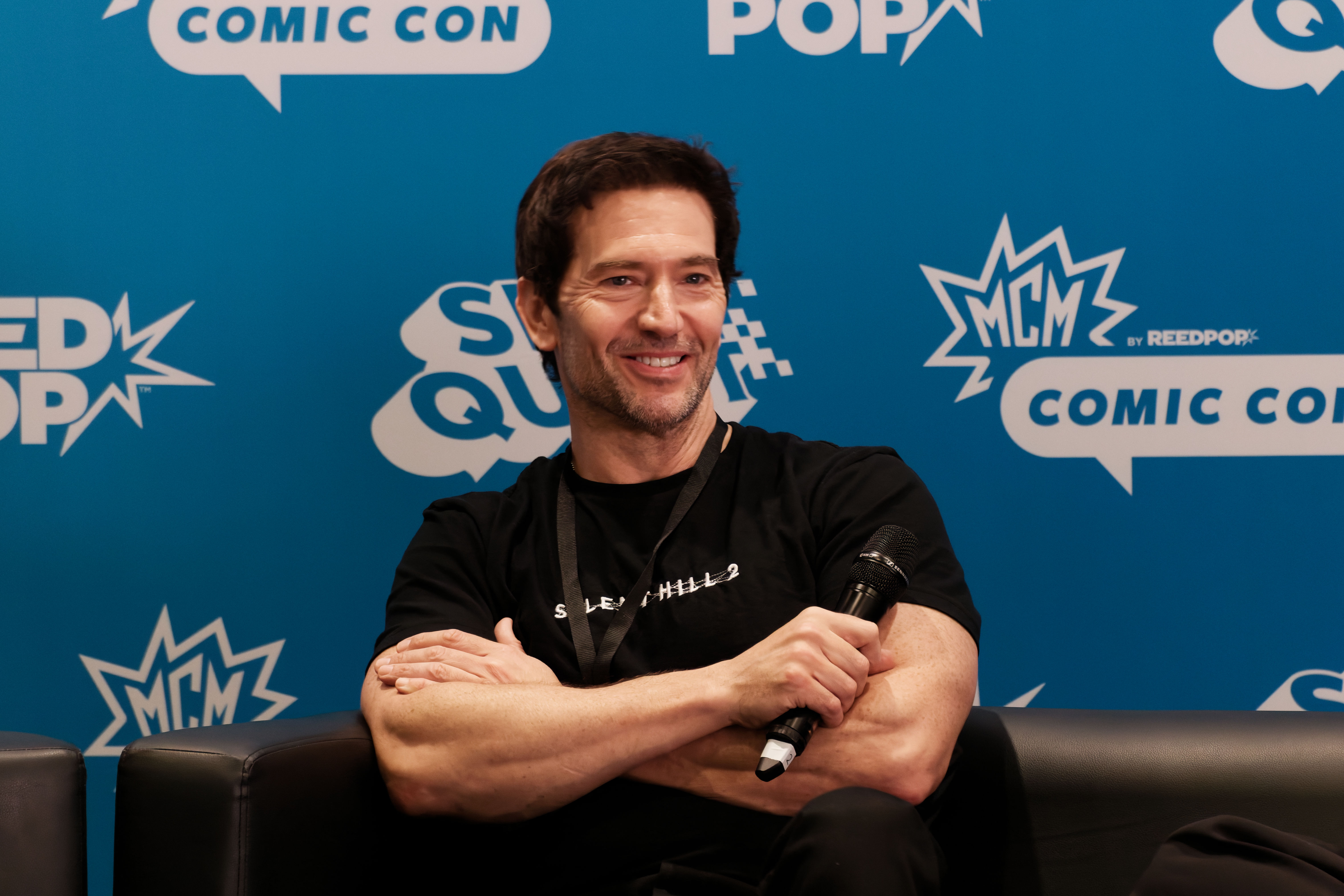
- Roberts in 2026
- Born: Luke John Roberts
- Occupation: Actor
- Years active: 2001–present

Luke John Roberts (born 1977) is an English actor. He is known for portraying Joseph Byrne in the medical drama series Holby City (2006–2022) and James Sunderland in the 2024 remake of Silent Hill 2, receiving nominations at the BAFTA, Golden Joystick and The Game Awards.

Roberts's early roles include the soap opera Crossroads (2003) and the drama series Mile High (2004–2005). Outside of Holby City and Silent Hill 2, he played Woodes Rogers in the adventure series Black Sails (2016–2017), Arthur Dayne in an episode of the fantasy series Game of Thrones (2016), and led the Global series Ransom (2017–2019).

== Early life and education ==
Roberts was born in Suffolk. He was educated at Woodbridge School and Swansea University, where he read American Studies. Afterwards, he graduated from the London Academy of Music and Dramatic Art in 2000.

== Career ==
In 2001, Roberts made his television debut in the war drama miniseries Band of Brothers in the episode "Crossroads". From 2004 to 2005, he appeared on the second season of Sky One's Mile High. In 2005, Roberts made his film debut in the thriller movie by Nicolas Forzy titled Ambition. He portrayed Doctor Joseph Byrne in the BBC One's medical drama series Holby City. In 2011, he appeared in the fantasy swashbuckler film Pirates of the Caribbean: On Stranger Tides.

Roberts starred in the 2013 fantasy horror film by Pearry Reginald Teo titled Dracula: The Dark Prince alongside Jon Voight, Kelly Wenham and Ben Robson, in which he played the lead role of Dracula. He bagged a recurring role in the first season of The CW's historical romantic drama series Reign. In 2014, he appeared in the epic historical action film 300: Rise of an Empire. In the same year, he took on a supporting role in the action comedy police procedural series Taxi Brooklyn and appeared on the first season of the BBC Two Wolf Hall, which is based on the book of the same name about 1500s England. In 2016, Roberts joined the cast of Starz's Black Sails as Governor Woodes Rogers, a formidable foe to the pirates of Nassau. He also appeared as the legendary knight Ser Arthur Dayne in sixth season of HBO's Game of Thrones.

In 2017, Roberts was cast to play the lead role in the crime suspense drama series Ransom where he played the lead character named Eric Beaumont. The series ran from 2017 to 2019. Also in 2019, he had a recurring role in the drama miniseries The Rook as Marcus Kevler.

In 2022, Roberts appeared in the superhero film The Batman and had a supporting role in the fantasy horror film Dampyr.

In 2023, Roberts starred alongside Ally Maki in the drama film Seagrass.

In 2024, Roberts starred as protagonist James Sunderland in the horror video game Silent Hill 2, a remake of the 2001 game of the same name. For his performance, he was nominated for Best Lead Performer at the Golden Joystick Awards 2024 and Best Performance at The Game Awards 2024.

Roberts currently plays Mark in Hudson and Rex.

== Filmography ==
=== Film ===
Key
†	Denotes films that have not yet been released

Year	Title	Role	Notes
2005	Ambition	Bruce	
2010	Pull	Luke	Short film
2011	Pirates of the Caribbean: On Stranger Tides	Captain of the guard	
2013	Dracula: The Dark Prince	Dracula	
2014	300: Rise of an Empire	Butcher	
2016	Dating My Mother	Norman the Dealer	
2022	The Batman	Thomas Wayne	
2022	Dampyr	Draka	
2023	Seagrass	Steve	
TBA	The Adventures of Audra †	Richard Bennett	Pre-production
TBA	Everything & The Universe †	Brian Moffett	Pre-production

=== Television ===
Year	Title	Role	Notes
2001	Band of Brothers	Herbert J. Suerth	Miniseries; episode: "Crossroads"
2003	Crossroads	Ryan Samson	98 episodes
2004–2005	Mile High	Captain Dan Peterson	Main role
2005–2022	Holby City	Daniel Fryer, Joseph Byrne	Episode: "No Pain, No Gain"; main role (series 8–13); recurring role
2006	Uncle Max	Hunk	Episode: "Uncle Max Goes Bowling"
2008	HolbyBlue	Joseph Byrne	Episode: "2.1"
2011	Law & Order: UK	Tom Hartson	Episode: "Fault Lines"
2013	Beauty & the Beast	Connor Servino	Episode: "Seeing Red"
2013	Reign	Simon Westbrook	2 episodes
2014	Taxi Brooklyn	Rhys Richards	5 episodes
2015	Wolf Hall	Henry Norris	
2015	The Dovekeepers	Jachim Ben Simon	
2016–2017	Black Sails	Woodes Rogers	Lead role
2016	Game of Thrones	Ser Arthur Dayne	Episode: "Oathbreaker"
2017–2019	Ransom	Eric Beaumont	Lead role
2019	A Working Mom's Nightmare	Mark Hartman	Television film
2022	Guillermo del Toro's Cabinet of Curiosities	Eddie Sykes / The Traveler	Episode: "The Autopsy"
2024	The Tourist	Marlowe / Dr. Watkins	1 episode
2024	Sister Boniface Mysteries	Kingsley Markham	Episode: "Never Too Deadly to Die"
2025	Hudson & Rex	Mark	2 episodes
2025	Terminal List: Dark Wolf	Courier	Episode 5: "E&E"
	Robin Hood	Amaury D'Montfort	Season 2 cast

=== Video games ===
Year	Title	Role	Notes
2012	Risen 2: Dark Waters	Nameless hero	Voice role
2024	Outcast: A New Beginning	Cutter Slade	Voice role
2024	Silent Hill 2	James Sunderland	Voice role and motion-capture

== Awards and nominations ==
Year	Award	Category	Work	Result	Ref.
2024	Golden Joystick Awards	Best Lead Performer	Silent Hill 2	Nominated	
2024	The Game Awards	Best Performance	Silent Hill 2	Nominated	
2025	British Academy Games Awards	Performer in a Leading Role	Silent Hill 2	Nominated	
