= Donna Burke =

Australian voice actress

- Born: Melbourne, Victoria, Australia
- Occupations: Voice actress; singer; narrator; businesswoman
- Years active: 1997–present
- Spouse: Bill Benfield
- Musical career
- Genres: Pop; jazz
- Instrument: Vocals
- Years active: 1987–present
- Label: Dag Music
- Website: donnaburke.com

Donna Burke (born 1964) is an Australian actress, singer, and businesswoman. She primarily voices characters in anime and video games, including Angela Orosco in Silent Hill 2 (2001), Claudia Wolf in Silent Hill 3 (2003), and has performed songs for the Metal Gear and Final Fantasy video game series.

== Biography ==
Burke graduated from Edith Cowan University. Her education included "operatic voice, speech and drama" and she received classical voice training for ten years.

From 1989 to 1995, Burke taught Media, English and Religious Education to senior students at Chisholm Catholic College. She moved to Japan in 1996 and initially worked as a teacher of English before obtaining some recording work.

Burke married Bill Benfield, a British former teacher. In 2004, Burke and Benfield started a record label, Dagmusic, which catered for foreign artists. Burke released her debut album, Lost and Found, through Dagmusic.

Burke has worked as a freelance announcer at NHK since 1999. She is also the lyricist for numerous Japanese TV commercials, anime songs and J-pop group tunes.

Burke created Hotteeze in 2004, a company she created to export Japanese heat pads worldwide.

== Voice work ==
Burke's voice has been used in Japan since 2005 for announcements on the Tokaido, Sanyo, and Kyushu Shinkansen bullet train system. Her voice is also used in Narita Airport Delta lounges and in English language guidance for the Emperor Showa Memorial Museum.

In 2007, Burke narrated a documentary titled Climate in Crisis - Part 1, which won the 2007 silver medal for Environment/Ecology at the New York Television Festival and the 2007 Earth Vision Award at the Tokyo Global Environmental Film Festival.

== Filmography ==
=== Anime ===
Year	Title	Role	Notes
2000	Strange Dawn	Yuko Miyabe	
2002	Voices of a Distant Star	Operator of the Lysithea	
2003	Trip Trek	Catherine, Three Bee	
2004–2018	Magical Girl Lyrical Nanoha series	Raising Heart	
2010	Little Charo 2	Kanon	
2014–2017	Fastening Days	Anna, Kelly (ep. 2)	
2016	Princess Sesame	Queen	
	Mainichi Kaasan	Grandmother	

=== Video games ===
Year	Title	Role	Notes
2000	Shenmue	Others	
2001	Silent Hill 2	Angela Orosco	
2001	Virtua Fighter 4	Vanessa Lewis	
2002	Shenmue II	Additional Voices	PC, PS4, Xbox, Xbox One versions
2003	Silent Hill 3	Claudia Wolf	Original release only
2003	Dino Crisis 3	Sonya Hart	Motion capture
2003	F-Zero GX	Mrs. Arrow	
2003	Boktai: The Sun Is in Your Hand	Hel	
2003	Bloody Roar 4	Uranus	Credited as Donnna Burke
2004	Final Fantasy Crystal Chronicles	Storytelling Narrator	
2004	Boktai 2: Solar Boy Django	Lady, Dvalinn	
2004	Rumble Roses	Anesthesia / Dr. Cutter	
2005	Virtua Quest	Vanessa Lewis	
2006	Let's Go Jungle!: Lost on the Island of Spice	Norah	
2007	Lunar Knights	Ursula	
2008	Cooking Mama: World Kitchen	Boy, Maylee	
2010	Magical Girl Lyrical Nanoha A's Portable: The Battle of Aces	Raising Heart	
2011	Magical Girl Lyrical Nanoha A's Portable: The Gears of Destiny	Raising Heart	
2012	Lumines Electronic Symphony	Announcer	
2012	Diabolical Pitch	Christina	
2014	Metal Gear Solid V: Ground Zeroes	iDROID	
2015	Metal Gear Solid V: The Phantom Pain	iDROID	
2016	NightCry	Jessica, Angie, Maria, Kelly	
2016	Let It Die	Various	
2017	Arms	Dr. Coyle	
2018	Fitness Boxing	Laura	
2019	Homestar VR Special Edition	Narrator	
2020	Final Fantasy Crystal Chronicles: Remastered Edition	Narrator	
2020	Fitness Boxing 2: Rhythm and Exercise	Laura	
2021	Phantasy Star Online 2: New Genesis	System Voice	
2024	Evotinction	Annabel	

== Solo discography ==
- Lost and Found (with Bill Benfield) (2000)
- Éirí na Gréine (2001)
- Donna Burke with the David Silverman Quartet (2002)
- Goodbye Nakamura EP (2004)
- Blue Nights (1 June 2005)

== Other discography ==
- The Yamaha Educational Children's Songs CDs - Various Artists (1997–2003 - vocals for several tracks)
- Automne - Various Artists (1998 - vocals for "Love Theme from Romeo and Juliet," vocals and lyrics for other tracks)
- Para Para Panic CDs - Volumes 2, 3, 4, 5, 6 & 7 / Various Artists (2000 - vocals for several tracks)
- Elebits - "The Smile of You" (2006 - in collaboration with Naoyuki Satō)
- ABBA Ibiza Caliente Mix - ABBA, Sabu (2001 - vocals for several tracks)
- The Bleep Brothers (2001 - vocals for three tracks)
- Vandread: Original OVA Soundtrack 1 - Yasunori Iwasaki, Various Artists (2001 - vocal for "What a Wonderful World")
- Vandread: Original OVA Soundtrack 2 - Yasunori Iwasaki, Various Artists (2001 - vocal and lyrics for "Somedays")
- Strange Dawn - "To The Sky" (2002)
- Turn A Gundam: Original Movie Soundtrack - "Wakusei no Gogo, Bokura wa Kisu wo Shita" - Yoko Kanno (2002 - vocal for "After All")
- "Seven" - V6 (2002 - lyrics for "One")
- Final Fantasy Crystal Chronicles - "Morning Sky" and "Moonless Starry Night"
- Haibane Renmei: Original OVA Soundtrack 1 - "Hanenone (ハネノネ)" - Kow Otani, Masumi Sakaue (2003 - vocal and lyrics for "Wondering")
- Honda Legend 2004 television commercial campaign - "The Phantom of the Opera" (with Dennis Gunn)
- JR Central 2006 television commercial campaign - "Again" (with Nello Angelucci, based on the Polovtsian Dances)
- Dance Dance Revolution SuperNova - "Star Gate Heaven" and "Star Gate Heaven (FUTURE LOVE Mix)" - Various Artists (2006 - in collaboration with Sōta Fujimori)
- Tokimeki Memorial 2 Substories: Dancing Summer Vacation - "Hero ~Dancing Summer Mix English Ver.~"
- OutRun 2 - "Life Was a Bore"
- The Last Remnant - "Journey's End"
- Final Fantasy Crystal Chronicles: The Crystal Bearers - "Kuule tää unelmain" and "Ephemeron"
- God Eater - "God and Man"
- Tales of Legendia - "Hotarubi" and "My Tales" with Gab Desmond
- Metal Gear Solid: Peace Walker - "Heavens Divide"
- Metal Gear Solid V: The Phantom Pain - "Sins of the Father"
- Metal Gear Solid Vocal Tracks (2015 - vocals for several tracks)
- Tokyo Ghoul √A - "Glassy Sky"
- Implosion - Never Lose Hope - "Way in the Dark"
- Girls' Frontline - "A Moment of My Nightmare"
- Evotinction - "A Normal Life"

== Lyricist ==
- Final Fantasy 15 XP - "Choosing Hope" (2017)
- Implosion - "Way in the Dark" (2015)
- Resident Evil - "At the End of a Long Escape" (2013)
- Square Enix DISSIDIA012 - "Final Fantasy" (2011)
- The Last Ranker - "Born to Survive" (2010)
- Bandai Games - "God Eater" (2010)
- NHK Little Charo 2 - "Sayonara" (2010)
- Capcom - "Bio Hazard Dark Side Chronicles" (Sleeping Beauty) (2009)
- Capcom - "Last Ranker" (2009)
- Bandai Namco Games God Eater - "God and Man" (2009)
- Square Enix Last Remnant - "Journey’s End" (2008)
- Square Enix Final Fantasy Crystal Chronicles - "Moonless Starry Night", "Morning Sky" (2003)
- Haibanae Renmei - "Wondering" (2007)
- Konami Elebits - "The Smile Of You" (2006)
- Konami - "Star Gate Heaven" (2004)
