= Vandread =

Japanese anime television series

- Key visual of the series, featuring Hibiki Tokai (center), Dita Liebely (top), Meia Gisborn (right) and Jura Basil Elden (left)

ヴァンドレッド (Vandoreddo)
- Genre: Comedy; Harem; Space opera
- Light novel
- Written by: Takeshi Mori
- Published by: Kadokawa Shoten
- Imprint: Kadokawa Sneaker Bunko
- Original run: July 1, 2000 – April 27, 2002
- Volumes: 7
- Manga
- Written by: Takeshi Mori
- Illustrated by: Kotetsu Akane
- Published by: Kadokawa Shoten
- Magazine: Monthly Dragon Jr.
- Original run: July 2000 – February 2002
- Volumes: 2 + 1 extra
- Anime television series
- Directed by: Takeshi Mori
- Produced by: Maki Horiuchi; Ayumu Tanaka; Masashi Tsukino
- Written by: Atsuhiro Tomioka
- Music by: Yasunori Iwasaki
- Studio: Gonzo; Digimation
- Licensed by: AUS: Siren Visual; NA: Crunchyroll
- Original network: Wowow
- English network: CA: G4techTV Canada; SEA: AXN; US: Encore Action, WAM, Crunchyroll Channel; ZA: Animax
- Original run: October 3, 2000 – December 19, 2000
- Episodes: 13
Further information
Anime television series
Vandread: The Second Stage
Directed by	Takeshi Mori
Produced by	Maki Horiuchi; Ayumu Tanaka; Masashi Tsukino
Written by	Atsuhiro Tomioka
Music by	Yasunori Iwasaki
Studio	Gonzo; Digimation
Licensed by	AUS: Siren Visual; NA: Crunchyroll
Original network	Wowow
English network	CA: G4techTV Canada; SEA: AXN; US: Encore Action, WAM; ZA: Animax
Original run	October 5, 2001 – January 18, 2002
Episodes	13
Original video animation
Vandread Integral
Directed by	Takeshi Mori
Studio	Gonzo; Digimation
Licensed by	NA: Crunchyroll
Released	December 21, 2001
Runtime	75 minutes
Original video animation
Vandread Turbulence
Directed by	Takeshi Mori
Studio	Gonzo; Digimation
Licensed by	NA: Crunchyroll
Released	October 25, 2002
Runtime	97 minutes
- icon

Vandread (Japanese: ヴァンドレッド, Hepburn: Vandoreddo) is a Japanese anime television series directed by Takeshi Mori and produced by Gonzo and Digimation. The series is composed of two seasons consisting of 13 episodes each; Vandread, broadcast from October to December 2000, and Vandread: The Second Stage, broadcast from October 2001 to January 2002. The series was also adapted into a manga and light novel series.

== Plot ==
The male-only planet Taraak and the female-only planet Mejeer have been at war with each other for decades. During a military presentation of the Taraak space forces, their new combat ship, the Ikazuchi, is attacked and annexed by female pirates from Mejeer. Not wanting to lose, the commander of the Taraakian forces prefers to remotely destroy his ship with the intruders on board. However, a surprising event occurs. The Taraakian vessel and that of the pirates merge under the impulse of the Praksis crystal, a source of mysterious energy, to create a new vessel, which is later baptized NirVana. The Praksis energy ends up sending the newly formed vessel to the depths of space.

This merge also affects Mejeerian combat shuttles, known as Dreads, and a Taraakian mobile "armor", the Vanguard, transforming their appearance and giving the Dreads the ability to combine with the Vanguard, forming the Vandread units. Three men, a third-class worker and two officers who remained on board and were taken prisoner by the pirates, will have to collaborate and learn to coexist with the women pirates of Mejeer, because their survival depends on it.

== Broadcast and release ==
Produced by Gonzo and Digimation, and directed by Takeshi Mori, Vandread was broadcast for 13 episodes on Wowow from October 3 to December 19, 2000. An additional episode, Vandread Integral (ヴァンドレッド 胎動篇, Vandoreddo Taidō-hen), was released on home video on December 21, 2001.

A second season, Vandread: The Second Stage, was broadcast from October 5, 2001, to January 18, 2002. An additional episode, Vandread Turbulence (ヴァンドレッド 激闘篇, Vandoreddo Gekitō-hen), was released on home video on October 25, 2002.

== Songs ==
=== Opening and ending songs ===
- "Trust" ("Vandread" opening; also used as the ending in the last Second Stage episode) by Salia
- "Himegoto" ("Vandread" ending) by SiLC
- "Justice" ("Second Stage" opening) by Aki Kudo
- "Yes, Together" ("Second Stage" ending) by Yasunori Iwasaki, sung by Aki Kudo
- "Spacy Spicy Love" ("Turbulence" opening) by Mejare Pirates
- "Proof" ("Turbulance" ending) by Mejare Pirates

=== Insert songs ===
- "What a Wonderful World" ("Vandread" insert song) by Donna Burke
- "Somedays" ("Second Stage" insert) by Donna Burke
- "Ikutose Karuka"/"Many Many Tears"
- "Good Day Friends" (Dita's song) by Yumi Kakazu
- "Kanojo wa Dandysm" (Barnette's song)
- "Moon Light Lullaby" (Meia's song) by Fumiko Orikasa
- "Slow Down" (Jura's song)
- "Welcome Home" (Parfet's song)

== Related media ==
A total of seven light novel volumes, consisting of three Vandread volumes, three Vandread: The Second Stage volumes, and a Vandread: The Extra Stage volume, were released under Kadokawa Shoten's Kadokawa Sneaker Bunko imprint from July 1, 2000, to April 27, 2002.

A manga adaptation, illustrated by Kotetsu Akane, was serialized in Fujimi Shobo's Monthly Dragon Jr. from the July 2000 to the February 2002 issues. Fujimi Shobo collected its chapters in three tankōbon volumes (including a Special Stage volume), from January 10, 2001, to March 1, 2002.

== Reception ==
Enoch Lau of THEM Anime Reviews awarded the series 4 out of 5 stars, concluding that it is a great space opera anime that he would recommend to fans of Gundam or Macross. Allen Divers of Anime News Network (ANN) reviewed the first and fourth volumes of the first season on DVD, giving each an A and writing that the show continued to impress with its strong animation, artwork, cast performances, and compelling storyline. Carl Kimlinger of ANN awarded the show a B−, describing it as a veritable blast when focused on romantic complications and fan service, but an irritating drag when recycling shōnen philosophies in an attempt to appear substantive; he called it the definition of a mixed bag.

The entry for the show in The Encyclopedia of Science Fiction notes that contemporary reviews praised the series for its CGI sequences (well-executed for their time, though dated by later standards), its worldbuilding, and its use of a light romantic comedy framework to convey a message of cooperation over conflict. Detractors pointed to uneven pacing and stock characterization. Vandread remains a brisk, good-humored space opera whose appeal lies less in hard SF rigor than in its optimistic case for coexistence and competence under pressure. It is not a canon classic, but a representative early-2000s work: lively, accessible, quietly anti-conformist, and idealistic.
