= Evie Templeton =

English actress (born 2008)

- Templeton at Dragon Con in 2026
- Born: 31 December 2008 (age 17); Saint Michael, Barbados
- Education: Tring Park School for the Performing Arts
- Occupation: Actress
- Years active: 2022–present
- Height: 1.60 m (5 ft 3 in)

Evie Jayne Templeton (born 31 December 2008) is an Barbadian-born British actress. She is best known for playing Laura in the movie Return to Silent Hill (2026) and Agnes DeMille in the Netflix series Wednesday (2025).

== Early life ==
Evie Jayne Templeton was born in Barbados on 31 December 2008, the daughter of English parents. She has one sister, who is six years older and a professional ballet dancer. When Templeton was seven years old, she and her family returned to England and settled in an undisclosed town near London, where she attended Tring Park School for the Performing Arts.

== Career ==
Templeton made her acting debut in 2022, landing minor roles in BBC drama Life After Life and Disney film Pinocchio. Before this, she had appeared in Nativity on the UK tour and Les Misérables on the West End.

In 2023, Templeton landed her first major role in the horror film Lord of Misrule. In 2024, she voiced Laura in the video game remake Silent Hill 2, a role she reprised in the horror film Return to Silent Hill. In 2025, she portrayed Agnes DeMille in the second season of the Netflix comedy horror series Wednesday.

== Filmography ==
=== Film ===
| Year | Title | Role | Notes |
|---|---|---|---|
| 2022 | Pinocchio | Pleasure Island Troupe | |
| 2023 | Lord of Misrule | Grace Holland | |
| 2026 | Return to Silent Hill | Laura | |
| 2026 | Victorian Psycho | Drusilla Pounds | |

=== Television ===
| Year | Title | Role | Notes |
|---|---|---|---|
| 2022 | Life After Life | Frieda (Age 10) | Episode: #1.4 |
| 2024 | Criminal Record | Lisa Hegarty (Age 10) | Episode: "The Sixty-Twos" |
| 2025–present | Wednesday | Agnes DeMille | Main role; season 2-present |

=== Video games ===
| Year | Title | Role | Notes |
|---|---|---|---|
| 2024 | Silent Hill 2 | Laura | |
