= Jeremy Irvine =

English actor (born 1990)

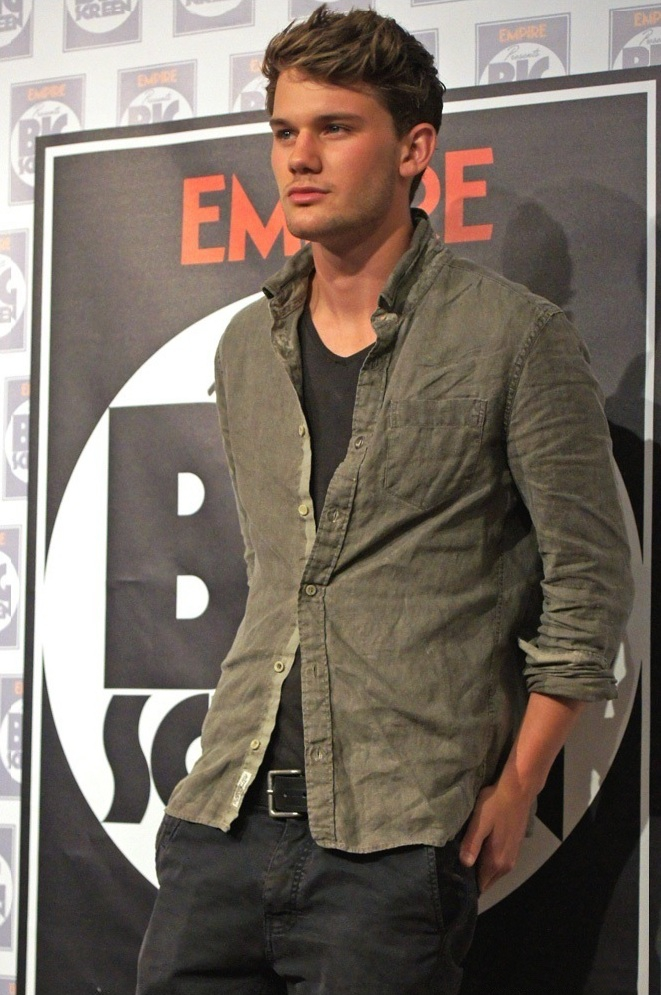
- Irvine in 2011
- Born: Jeremy William Fredric Smith; 18 June 1990 (age 36); Gamlingay, England
- Occupation: Actor
- Years active: 2009–present
- Spouse: Jodie Spencer (m. 2024, unknown)
- Children: 2
- Relatives: Ralph Lilley Turner (great-grandfather)

Jeremy William Fredric Smith (born 18 June 1990), known professionally as Jeremy Irvine, is an English actor. He made his film debut when Steven Spielberg chose him to star in the epic war film War Horse (2011) and has since starred in films such as Great Expectations (2012), The Railway Man (2013), and Mamma Mia! Here We Go Again (2018), and Return to Silent Hill (2026), as well as the television series Treadstone (2019).

Irvine has earned a reputation as a method actor. For War Horse, he began lifting weights and gained 6.4 kilograms (14 lb) of muscle, underwent two months of intensive horseback training, and spent so much time recreating the Battle of Somme scene in the film that he got trench foot; for The Railway Man, he lost around 6.4 kilograms (14 lb) by starving himself for two months and performed his own torture scenes.

== Early life ==
Irvine was born Jeremy William Fredric Smith on 18 June 1990 in Gamlingay, Cambridgeshire, England, the son of Liberal Democrat councillor Bridget Smith and engineer Chris Smith. He has two younger brothers, one of whom portrayed a younger version of his character in Great Expectations (2012). His great-grandfather was Ralph Lilley Turner.

Irvine took his stage surname from his grandfather's first name. He started acting at age 16 after his drama teacher inspired him: "I never fitted in, which led me to acting. I was looking for something different." He played Romeo and other main roles in plays at Bedford Modern School, followed by a run with the National Youth Theatre.

After completing a one-year foundation course at the London Academy of Music and Dramatic Art (LAMDA), Irvine spent two years posting his CV through letterboxes to get acting work, during which time he worked in his local supermarket and did web design. He almost gave up acting just before he got his break in War Horse. In an interview with CBS News while promoting Great Expectations, he described this as the lowest point of his life and said that he considered taking a different career path: "My dad wanted me to get a job being a welder. At the company he was at, he was an engineer. I was very very close to doing that."

== Career ==
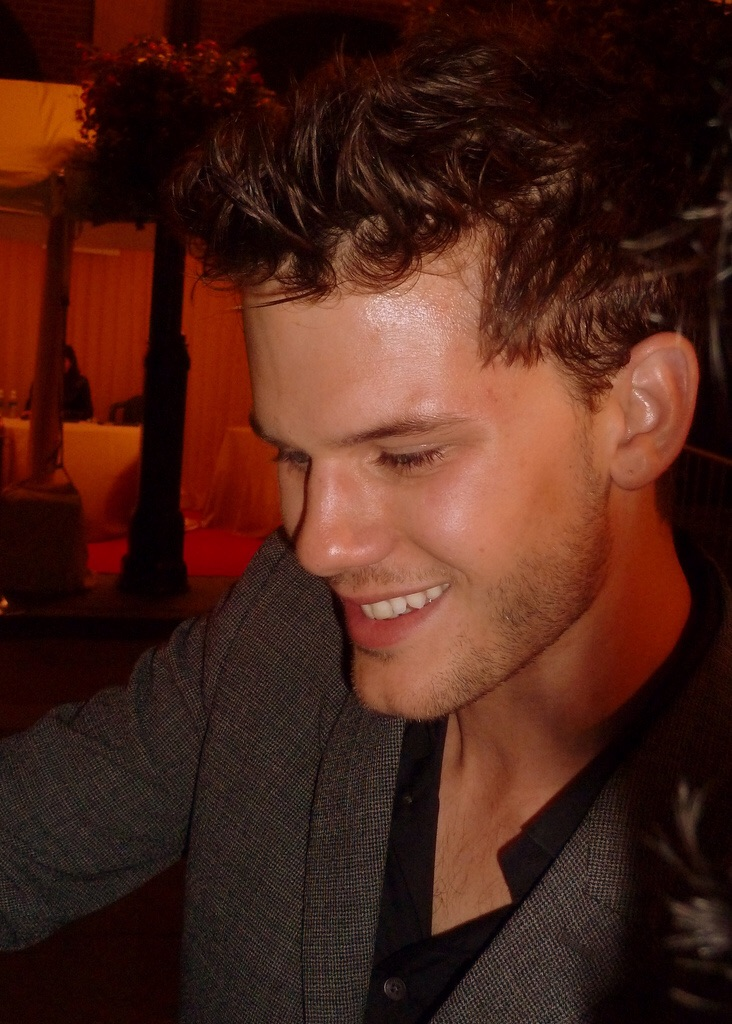
Irvine at the 2012 Toronto International Film Festival

Irvine played Luke in the television series Life Bites and appeared in the Royal Shakespeare Company's 2010 production of Dunsinane. He was quoted in Interview Magazine, saying: "My friends all took the mick out of me for Dunsinane saying, 'You're gonna be the tree'. Indeed, in my first scene, I was waving two branches."

In June 2010, he was cast in the lead role of the 2011 Steven Spielberg film War Horse. The film was an adaption of Michael Morpurgo's novel War Horse. Spielberg said he had been looking for an unknown actor for Albert: "I looked at hundreds of actors and newcomers for Albert – mainly newcomers – and nobody had the heart, the spirit or the communication skills that Jeremy had." Irvine was asked to read a section of the War Horse script on camera to check his West Country accent. To prepare for the role, he took up weight training and gained about 6.4 kilograms (14 lb) of muscle. He also underwent two months of intensive horse riding. He spent so much time recreating the Battle of Somme that he contracted trench foot. For his work, he was nominated for the London Film Critics' Choice Award for Young British Performer of the Year and the Empire Award for Best Male Newcomer.

In April 2011, Variety reported that Irvine had been cast as Pip in a 2012 film adaptation of Great Expectations. In October 2011, The Hollywood Reporter announced that he was set to play the young Eric Lomax in The Railway Man. He earned a reputation as a method actor after going two months without food, losing around 13 kilograms (2 st), and performing torture scene stunts in The Railway Man. He then starred in the independent film Now Is Good. In February 2013, Variety stated that he had been cast in a film based on The World Made Straight. Also in 2013, he was cast as Daniel Grigori in Fallen, based on the young adult series by Lauren Kate.

On 12 August 2014, Deadline reported that Irvine had been cast as Percy Bysshe Shelley in Mary Shelley's Monster. In November 2015, he starred in Don Broco's music video for "Nerve". He attended Bedford Modern School, the same school as the band's members. The following month, he joined the cast of Billionaire Boys Club. In July 2017, he confirmed that he had joined the cast of The Last Full Measure. In 2018, he portrayed the younger version of Sam Carmichael in Mamma Mia! Here We Go Again. In 2019, he starred as John Randolph Bentley in the USA Network television series Treadstone. In February 2024, it was announced that Irvine had been cast as Henry Beauchamp in the Outlander prequel Outlander: Blood of My Blood. He portrayed James Sunderland in the horror film Return to Silent Hill (2026), based on the Silent Hill video games. He will star in The Light Fantastic, a ballroom dancing comedy directed by Chris Cottam.

== Personal life ==
Irvine has had Type 1 diabetes since he was six years old, saying he was "on four injections a day", which he administered himself; his two brothers are also diabetic. He has taken part in trials with the Juvenile Diabetes Research Foundation (JDRF) to test an artificial pancreas, a form of automatic glucose meter attached to a portable insulin pump. The tests took place at Addenbrooke's Hospital with the University of Cambridge during 2005 and 2007. During a visit to the Cambridge Welcome Trust Clinical Research Facility on 7 February 2012, he discussed his experiences with Camilla, Duchess of Cornwall. He was again present with Camilla on 31 January 2013 at University College London Hospitals NHS Foundation Trust's inpatient adolescent ward, after she became president of the JDRF in 2012.

Irvine married midwife Jodie Spencer in 2024. They have twins. In a September 2026 interview with The Times, he said he was no longer married to Spencer.

He is known for his private nature and told the Coventry Telegraph in 2012, "I realised very quickly that I didn't want to be famous, so I don't go to Mahiki, I just go down the pub with all my mates." He also told Yahoo Movies, "When War Horse came out, I had maybe a month of people stopping me in the street, then it died down. I try to ignore all that and pretend none of it exists. We're only acting. The work my mum does, a lot of it is rehousing homeless people, that's a real job."

== Filmography ==
Key
†	Denotes films that have not yet been released

=== Film ===
Year	Title	Role	Notes
2011	War Horse	Albert Narracott	Nominated – London Film Critics' Choice Award for Young British Performer of the Year; Nominated – Empire Award for Best Male Newcomer
2012	Now Is Good	Adam	
2012	Great Expectations	Philip "Pip" Pirrip	
2013	The Railway Man	Young Eric Lomax	
2014	A Night in Old Mexico	Gally	
2014	Beyond the Reach	Ben	
2015	The Woman in Black: Angel of Death	Harry Burnstow	
2015	The World Made Straight	Travis Shelton	
2015	The Bad Education Movie	Atticus Hoye	
2015	Stonewall	Danny Winters	
2016	This Beautiful Fantastic	Billy	
2016	Fallen	Daniel Grigori	Direct-to-video
2018	Billionaire Boys Club	Kyle Biltmore	
2018	Mamma Mia! Here We Go Again	Young Sam Carmichael	
2019	Paradise Hills	Markus	
2019	The Professor and the Madman	Charles Hall	
2019	The Last Full Measure	William Pitsenbarger	
2020	Cognition	Abner	
2021	Benediction	Ivor Novello	
2022	This Is Christmas	Simon	
2023	Baghead	Neil	
2025	Turbulence	Zach	
2026	Return to Silent Hill	James Sunderland	

=== Television ===
Year	Title	Role	Notes
2009	Life Bites	Luke	Main cast (season 2)
2019	Celebrity SAS: Who Dares Wins	Himself	5 episodes
2019	Treadstone	J. Randolph Bentley	Main cast
2021	Dalgliesh	Charles Masterson	4 episodes
2025	Outlander: Blood of My Blood	Henry Beauchamp	Main role

=== Theatre ===
Year	Title	Role	Venue	Ref.
2010	Dunsinane		The Royal Shakespeare Company	
2016–2017	Buried Child	Vince	Trafalgar Studios	

=== Music videos ===
Year	Title	Role	Notes
2015	Don Broco		Nerve
2018	Friendly Fires		Heaven Let Me In
