= Masahiro Ito =

Japanese video game artist

Masahiro Ito (伊藤 暢達, Itō Masahiro) is a Japanese video game artist best known for his work with Team Silent.

== Career ==
Ito worked as background and monster designer on the survival horror video game Silent Hill in 1999. He was the art director for its sequel, Silent Hill 2 (2001), working on both the original game and its reissue Restless Dreams, as well as being the monster designer and modeler. Ito was the art director again in Silent Hill 3 (2003), as well as being a monster designer and modeler, background designer and modeler, drama camera designer, CGI movie editor.

According to Ito, after the release of Silent Hill 3 in 2003, him and fellow Team Silent members, Hiroyuki Owaku and Norihito Hatakeda were ordered by Konami to develop a video game that had a game design inspired by Grand Theft Auto. According to him, he was the art director, lead animator and motion designer for the game, which was developed over three years until its cancellation in 2006. According to him, he then left Konami in March 2006 and became a freelance artist, while Hatakeda was hired by Kojima Productions in 2006.

Ito and fellow Team Silent scriptwriter Hiroyuki Owaku went on to work together on Silent Hill: Cage of Cradle (2006) and Silent Hill: Double under Dusk (2007), digital mangas published by Konami, downloadable for cell-phones and only available in Japan.

He maintains a personal website, complete with an online gallery of his Silent Hill–oriented artwork. Ito designed the cover art for the Japanese release of Silent Hill: Downpour (2012).

In 2012, Masahiro Ito stated on his Twitter that he would be willing to work on another Silent Hill game with Hideo Kojima. In 2016 he worked with Hifumi Kono and Takashi Shimizu on the video game NightCry featuring Kiyoishi Arai (Final Fantasy) for visuals, design and in image board team.

== Works ==
Title	Year	Role
Silent Hill	1999	Background and monster designer
Silent Hill 2	2001	Art director, monster designer and modeler
Fukuro	2001	Creature designer and modeler
Silent Hill: Arcade	2001–2002	Art director (cancelled)
Silent Hill 3	2003	Art director, monster designer and modeler, background designer and modeler, drama camera designer, CGI movie editor
Untitled GTA-style game	2003–2006	Art director, lead animator and motion designer (cancelled)
Silent Hill: Dying Inside	2004	Alternate cover artist (volume 3)
Silent Hill: The Novel	2006	Illustrator
Silent Hill: Cage of Cradle	2006	Illustrator
Silent Hill 2: The Novel	2006	Illustrator
Silent Hill: Double under Dusk	2007	Illustrator
Silent Hill: The Arcade	2007	Illustrator
Silent Hill 3: The Novel	2007	Illustrator
Silent Hill: Origins	2008	Japanese soundtrack cover artist
White Hunter	2008	Illustrator, writer
Metal Gear Solid 4: Guns of the Patriots	2008	Painter
Silent Hill: Homecoming	2008	Japanese cover artist (cancelled)
Untitled Sony soviet retro sci-fi horror game	2008–2010	Art director, character and background designer (cancelled)
Space Battleship Yamato: Resurrection	2009	Tank designer
Shadows of the Damned	2011	Monster designer (unused)
Silent Hill: Downpour	2012	Japanese cover artist
Untitled Silent Hill sequel	2013	Concept artist (cancelled)
Untitled PSVR horror game	2015–2017	Art director, creature designer (cancelled)
NightCry	2016	Creature designer
Let It Die	2016	Character designer
Untitled PS4 horror game	2016	Creature designer (cancelled)
Metal Gear Survive	2018	Creature designer
Human Lost	2019	Creature designer
World of Tanks	2020	Environment designer
Silent Hill: The Short Message	2024	Creature and otherworld designer
Silent Hill 2 (remake)	2024	Creature designer
Synduality: Echo of Ada	2025	Cradlecoffin and environment modeling: 2D arts
