= Team Silent =

Japanese video game developer

- Type: Division
- Industry: Video games
- Founded: September 1996; 30 years ago
- Defunct: May 2007; 19 years ago
- Fate: Disbanded by Konami
- Headquarters: Tokyo, Japan
- Key people: Akira Yamaoka (producer, composer); Masahiro Ito (art director); Hiroyuki Owaku (scenario writer)
- Products: Silent Hill
- Number of employees: 70 (2004)
- Parent: Konami

Team Silent was a Japanese development team within Konami Computer Entertainment Tokyo (KCET), responsible for the first four games in the Silent Hill franchise by Konami released from 1999 to 2004. KCET was merged into the parent company on April 1, 2005. Konami Digital Entertainment (KDE) was established by the parent company on March 31, 2006.

== History ==
According to Kenzie LaMar, lead character artist of Silent Hill: Homecoming, Team Silent was developing the cancelled Silent Hill 5, when they were ultimately disbanded by Konami itself, because Konami wanted other developers to make the games and wanted the games to be different. Later titles were developed by Western companies, such as Climax Studios, Double Helix Games and Vatra Games.

== Members ==
Key members of Team Silent include (arranged by last name):

- Norihito Hatakeda: Graphic engine programmer of Silent Hill 2 and Silent Hill 3. According to Ito, Hatakeda left Team Silent after the release of Silent Hill 3 in 2003, alongside Ito and Owaku in order to work on a title, which had a game design inspired by Grand Theft Auto. According to Ito, the game was eventually cancelled and Hatakeda was hired by Kojima Productions in 2006.
- Akihiro Imamura: Game system programmer of Silent Hill, producer of Silent Hill 2, director of the PC port of Silent Hill 3, sub-producer of Silent Hill 4: The Room. His last game he worked on was the cancelled Silent Hill 5.
- Masahiro Ito: Background and monster designer of Silent Hill, art director and monster designer of Silent Hill 2 and Silent Hill 3. According to him, he left Team Silent after the release of Silent Hill 3 in 2003, alongside Owaku and Hatakeda in order to work on a title, which had a game design inspired by Grand Theft Auto. According to him, the game was eventually cancelled and he left Konami in March 2006 in order to become a freelance artist.
- Gozo Kitao: Producer of Silent Hill, executive producer of Silent Hill 2 and Silent Hill 3. He later joined Game Studio.
- Suguru Murakoshi: Drama director and animator of Silent Hill 2, director and scenario writer of Silent Hill 4: The Room. He later worked at Kojima Productions and Tango Gameworks.
- Kazuhide Nakazawa: Character animator of Silent Hill 2, director and monster designer of Silent Hill 3.
- Hiroyuki Owaku: Enemy and event programmer of Silent Hill, scenario writer of Silent Hill 2 and Silent Hill 3. He also wrote the original lyrics for the music of Silent Hill 4: The Room. According to Ito, Owaku left Team Silent after the release of Silent Hill 3 in 2003, alongside Ito and Hatakeda in order to work on a title, which had a game design inspired by Grand Theft Auto. According to Ito, the game was eventually cancelled in 2006. Owaku and Ito went on to work together on Silent Hill: Cage of Cradle (2006) and Silent Hill: Double under Dusk (2007), digital mangas published by Konami, downloadable for cell-phones and only available in Japan.
- Takayoshi Sato: Character designer and CGI creator of Silent Hill and Silent Hill 2. According to Ito, after development on Silent Hill 2 wrapped up, Sato was supposed to work on Silent Hill 3 as a character designer and CGI creator, but since the development period was 10 months, it was impossible schedule-wise. He drafted a script for Silent Hill 3 which went unused, before he left Konami in order to join Electronic Arts in February 2003 following a disagreement concerning his pay on Silent Hill 2. He subsequently joined Virtual Heroes, Inc. in June 2007 and he later joined Nintendo in February 2012 as a visual producer.
- Keiichiro Toyama: Director, scenario writer and background designer of Silent Hill. Left Konami to join Japan Studio (Project Siren) in 1999 and created the Siren series of games. Left Sony in September 2020 and founded his own studio, Bokeh Game Studio, where he directed Slitterhead.
- Masashi Tsuboyama: Background and motion designer of Silent Hill, director and town designer of Silent Hill 2, art director and monster designer of Silent Hill 4: The Room, director of the cancelled Silent Hill 5. He later worked at Yuke's and Good-Feel.
- Akira Yamaoka: Composer of Silent Hill, Silent Hill 2, Silent Hill 3, Silent Hill 4: The Room and the cancelled Silent Hill 5, producer of Silent Hill 3 and Silent Hill 4: The Room. Left Konami on December 1, 2009 and joined Grasshopper Manufacture on February 3, 2010.
- Shingo Yuri: Character modeler of Silent Hill 2 and Silent Hill 3, character designer of Silent Hill 4: The Room. According to Ito, Yuri was hired by Kojima Productions in 2006. According to Ito, Yuri died in 2017. His last game he worked on was Death Stranding, for which he received posthumous credit as a character artist. He was 47 years old.

Akira Yamaoka played a major role in the Silent Hill film adaptation by overseeing and approving specific aspects of the movie throughout its production. Some of the original members (as led by Toyama, director of the first Silent Hill game) went on to create the Siren series, which has a similar atmosphere to the Silent Hill franchise.

== Legacy ==
In 2017, when asked if Team Silent would ever reunite, Yamaoka said he was not against the idea, but also said that "it's hard to say because everyone has evolved, and maybe the mindset has changed as well. Also, the technology and the games industry as a whole has changed as well. Even if we got back together I'm not even sure we could do something great so it's very hard to say at the moment".
