= Silent Hill (film series) =

Horror film series based on video game franchise

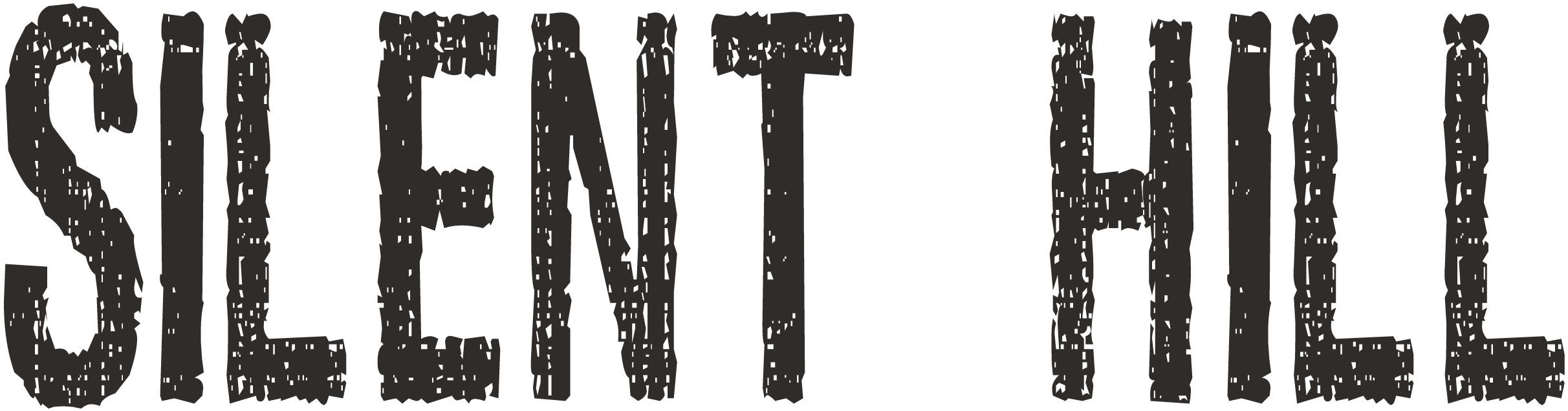
- Directed by: Christophe Gans (1, 3); M. J. Bassett (2)
- Written by: Roger Avary (1); M. J. Bassett (2); Christophe Gans (3); Sandra Vo-Ahn (3); Will Schneider (3)
- Based on: Silent Hill by Keiichiro Toyama
- Produced by: Samuel Hadida (1–2); Don Carmody (1–2); Victor Hadida (3); Molly Hassell (3); David M. Wulf (3)
- Starring: Radha Mitchell; Sean Bean; Jeremy Irvine; Laurie Holden; Deborah Kara Unger
- Production companies: Konami; Davis Films; TriStar Pictures (1); Open Road Films (2); Silent Hill DCP Inc. (1–2); Electric Shadow (3); Supernix (3); WIP (3)
- Distributed by: Sony Pictures Releasing (1); Open Road Films (2); Alliance Films (1–2); Metropolitan Filmexport; Cineverse (3); Iconic Events Releasing (3)
- Release dates: April 21, 2006 (1); October 26, 2012 (2); January 23, 2026 (3)
- Language: English
- Budget: Total (3 films): $93 million
- Box office: Total (3 films): $203.8 million

Silent Hill is a psychological horror film series, based on the video game series of the same name by Konami.

Proposed by Christophe Gans, and adapted from the video game Silent Hill (1999), the film series began with the release of Silent Hill (2006). The film was followed by a sequel, Silent Hill: Revelation (2012), based on Silent Hill 3 (2003). The series was later rebooted, with a third film titled Return to Silent Hill (2026), which adapted the video game Silent Hill 2 (2001).

The series has grossed over $200 million at the box office worldwide and has received generally negative reviews from critics.

== Films ==
=== Silent Hill (2006) ===
During the filming of Brotherhood of the Wolf, director Christophe Gans first proposed the idea of directing of a Silent Hill film to producer Samuel Hadida, who reacted positively to the news. Several years later, Gans was awarded the rights to a film adaptation from Konami, having competed against Paramount Pictures, Sam Raimi, and Cruise/Wagner Productions, after he demonstrated his personal knowledge of the video game series. Gans initially wished to adapt the second game in the series, but later decided against it, as it would prove "impossible to tell that story" without explanation, "So we decided to go back to the first one, because in the first game, we have the explanation of why Silent Hill became that strange zone."

Gans and Roger Avary then began working on the film's screenplay in 2004, and began principal photography in 2005. Radha Mitchell, Sean Bean, Laurie Holden, Jodelle Ferland, Deborah Kara Unger, and Alice Krige, among others, were cast in the film. Bean's character did not appear in the initial screenplay and was added by Gans later, due to the producer's concerns over a lack of male characters. The film was shot in Ontario, Canada and on sound stages, and was released to theaters in the U.S. on April 21, 2006.

=== Silent Hill: Revelation (2012) ===
Following Gans' departure from the project in 2007, Lionsgate brought on director M. J. Bassett in 2010, and announced the title of the next film as Silent Hill: Revelation 3D. The film featured several returning characters from its predecessor, and serves as a direct sequel to the first film, rather than as an adaptation of another game. However, the film does feature elements from the 2003 video game Silent Hill 3, such as the inclusion of character Heather Mason.

Silent Hill: Revelation was released theatrically in Canada on October 26, 2012.

=== Return to Silent Hill (2026) ===
In October 2012, Bassett stated that if a sequel to Revelation was made, it would adapt stories from the graphic novels, rather than the video games.

In January 2020, Christophe Gans stated during an interview that he was working on a new film in the series with Victor Hadida. In June 2022, Gans stated that he was working on the film and expected it to be released in 2023.

On October 19, 2022, Konami officially announced that a new film was in development, titled Return to Silent Hill, with Gans returning to direct and Victor Hadida serving as a producer. The film is based on the 2001 video game Silent Hill 2 and features the return of Pyramid Head. It is written by Gans, Sandra Vo-Ahn, and Will Schneider. In February 2023, Deadline reported that Return to Silent Hill had secured funding and would begin filming soon. In March 2023, Deadline also reported that Jeremy Irvine and Hannah Emily Anderson were cast in the film's lead roles, with filming set to begin in April. Production finished in January 2025.

The film was released in the United States on January 23, 2026.

=== Future ===
In a January 2026 interview with Variety, Gans expressed interest in creating a fourth film, saying "If I have the opportunity, we'll come back to ‘Silent Hill’ once more".

In a January 2026 IGN interview with composer Akira Yamaoka, Yamaoka expressed hopes that Silent Hill 4: The Room would be adapted into a film next. Yamaoka stated that he hoped that the potential film would be directed by Gans, so they could collaborate again. In a later French interview with Christophe Gans, Gans was asked about Yamaoka's remarks, to which Gans replied that he wished to direct another film first, before considering a return to the franchise.

On September 20, 2026, The Wall Street Journal revealed that Roy Lee is developing a Silent Hill reboot movie he'll be producing.

== Crew ==
Film	U.S. release date	Director(s)	Screenwriter(s)	Producer(s)
Original series
Silent Hill	April 21, 2006	Christophe Gans	Roger Avary	Don Carmody & Samuel Hadida
Silent Hill: Revelation	October 26, 2012	M. J. Bassett	M. J. Bassett	Don Carmody & Samuel Hadida
Reboot
Return to Silent Hill	January 23, 2026	Christophe Gans	Sandra Vo-Anh, Will Schneider & Christophe Gans	Victor Hadida

== Recurring cast and characters ==
List indicators

This section includes characters who will appear or have appeared in more than two films in the series.

- An empty grey cell indicates the character was not in the film, or that the character's official presence has not yet been confirmed.
- ^{A} indicates an appearance through archival footage or audio.
- ^{C} indicates a cameo role.
- ^{O} indicates an older version of the character.
- ^{P} indicates an appearance in onscreen photographs.
- ^{Y} indicates a younger version of the character.

Character	Original series		Reboot
Character	Silent Hill	Silent Hill: Revelation	Return to Silent Hill
Character	2006	2012	2026
Rose Da Silva	Radha Mitchell	Radha Mitchell^{C}	
Christopher Da Silva (Harry Mason)	Sean Bean	Sean Bean	
Sharon Da Silva (Heather Mason) Alessa Gillespie Dark Alessa	Jodelle Ferland Lorry Ayers^{O}	Adelaide Clemens Erin Pitt^{Y} Jodelle Ferland^{Y}^{A}^{P}	
Dahlia Gillespie	Deborah Kara Unger	Deborah Kara Unger	
Red Pyramid (Pyramid Head)	Roberto Campanella	Roberto Campanella	Robert Strange
Armless Man (Lying Figure)	Michael Cota	Chris Anton	Giulia Pelagatti
Sister Margaret	Eve Crawford	Eve Crawford^{A}	
Dark Nurses (Bubble Headed Nurses)	Various	Various	Various
Creepers	CGI		CGI
Christabella LaRoache	Alice Krige	Mentioned	

== Other media ==
=== Books ===
- Edgewood, Paula (June 2006). Silent Hill: The Novel. Japan: Kadokawa Shoten. (Japan only)
- Abe, Kiyomi (June 2013). Silent Hill: Revelation. Japan: Takeshobo. ISBN 978-4812495148. (Japan only)
- Passarella, John (January 2026). Return to Silent Hill: The Official Movie Novelization. United States: Titan Books. ISBN 978-1835413319.
- Bernstein, Abbie. Return to Silent Hill: The Making of the Movie. Australia: Titan Books. ISBN 978-1835413333. (Unreleased)

=== Soundtrack ===
- Jeff Danna; Akira Yamaoka (2013). Silent Hill Revelation 3D (Original Motion Picture Soundtrack). Lakeshore Records.
- Jeff Danna; Akira Yamaoka (2019). Silent Hill (Original Motion Picture Soundtrack). Digital River.
- Akira Yamaoka (2026). Return to Silent Hill (Original Motion Picture Soundtrack). Laced Records.

== Reception ==
=== Box office performance ===
Film	Revenue			Budget	References
Film	Domestic	International	Worldwide	Budget	References
Silent Hill	$47.0 million	$53.6 million	$100.6 million	$50 million	
Silent Hill: Revelation	$17.5 million	$37.8 million	$55.4 million	$20 million	
Return to Silent Hill	$5.5 million	$42.2 million	$47.8 million	$23 million	

=== Critical and public response ===
Film	Rotten Tomatoes	Metacritic	CinemaScore
Silent Hill	34% (112 reviews)	31 (21 reviews)	C
Silent Hill: Revelation	8% (61 reviews)	16 (14 reviews)	C
Return to Silent Hill	18% (66 reviews)	34 (14 reviews)	—N/a

== Home media ==
Film	Format	U.S. release date	Distributor	Notes
Silent Hill	DVD, Blu-ray, UMD	August 22, 2006	Sony Pictures Home Entertainment	
Silent Hill	Blu-ray	July 9, 2019	Scream Factory	Remastered two-disc collector's edition with new bonus features.
Silent Hill: Revelation	DVD, Blu-ray, Blu-ray 3D	February 12, 2013	Universal Studios Home Entertainment	
Return to Silent Hill	DVD, Blu-ray, Ultra HD Blu-ray	March 17, 2026	Cinedigm	
Return to Silent Hill	VHS	Late 2026	Bloody Disgusting	
