= Heather Mason =

Fictional character in Silent Hill 3

- Silent Hill character
- Heather Mason in Silent Hill 3
- First appearance: Silent Hill (1999; as Alessa, Cheryl and Baby Heather); Silent Hill 3 (2003; as Heather)
- Designed by: Shingo Yuri
- Voiced by: Sandra Wane (Silent Hill); Heather Morris (Silent Hill 3); Jennifer Woodward (Origins); Kate Higgins (Shattered Memories); Amanda Winn Lee (HD Collection)
- Motion capture: Heather Morris (Silent Hill 3)
- Portrayed by: Jodelle Ferland (as Child Alessa; film); Lorry Ayers (as Adult Alessa; film); Erin Pitt (as Alessa; Revelation); Adelaide Clemens (as Heather; Revelation)

Heather Mason (ヘザー・メイソン, Hezā Meison) is a fictional character in Silent Hill, a survival horror video game series created by Japanese company Konami. She is first introduced as a supporting character in the original Silent Hill (1999), and later returns as the main protagonist of Silent Hill 3 (2003). She also appeared in Dead by Daylight (2020) as a playable character.

In the third game, Heather is the adopted daughter of protagonist Harry Mason. She is the reincarnation of Alessa Gillespie and Cheryl Mason, and is instrumental to antagonist Claudia Wolf's efforts to bring about the rebirth of "God".

Heather and Cheryl Mason are also fused into a single character, Cheryl Heather Mason, for Silent Hill: Shattered Memories (2009), a reimagination of the original Silent Hill; at the end of the story, she is revealed to be the game's true protagonist.

The adult and child Alessa are respectively portrayed by Lorry Ayers and Jodelle Ferland in the 2006 Silent Hill film, with Erin Pitt assuming the role in the 2012 sequel film Silent Hill: Revelation, of which the reborn Heather also serves as the main character, portrayed by Adelaide Clemens.

== Appearances ==
=== Backstory ===
Heather is the reincarnation of Alessa Gillespie, a young girl with strange supernatural abilities who grew up in the small American town known as Silent Hill. Alessa was abused by her mother Dahlia and was forced into her mother's cult, The Order. She was bullied heavily at school, with children calling her a witch. One of her only friends was a young Claudia Wolf, whom Alessa loved as a sister.

When Alessa was seven, Dahlia and The Order tried to use her to give birth to the cult's god. The ceremony led to Alessa receiving severe burns all across her body. Instead of birthing the cult's god, Alessa was able to spilt her soul in the ritual and the new spilt part became a baby. The baby was found by Harry Mason and his wife Jodie, and they named the girl Cheryl. Alessa remained burned and was cared for in secret by the Order and a nurse named Lisa Garland.

=== Events of Silent Hill ===
Seven years later, a now widowed Harry Mason decided to take Cheryl on vacation to Silent Hill. Alessa sensed them coming and sent out an apparition in front of their jeep, forcing a crash. Harry became separated from Cheryl and spent the game looking for her. He was tricked by Dahlia into believing Alessa to be a demon, inadvertently helping The Order merge Alessa and Cheryl back into one being.

Depending on the actions of the player, the newly whole Alessa can either transform into a heavenly being known as the Incubator, or she expels a demon known as the Incubus. Either way, Dahlia is slain by either Incubator or Incubus, forcing Harry to kill the monster. If Harry destroys the Incubus, it gives players the "good" or "good+" ending, with both potentially considered to be the canon endings. Once the Incubus is dead, Alessa would hand over Harry an infant girl, who is actually a reincarnation of her and Cheryl's souls. Alessa then uses the last of her energy to teleport Harry and the baby (and maybe the police officer Cybil Bennett depending on which ending players got), before dying. Despite the initial hesitation to raise the child, Harry decides to do so. Originally naming her Cheryl, he decides to start calling her Heather instead.

=== Silent Hill 3 ===
After Heather turned seventeen, she meets a private investigator named Douglas Cartland at a mall. She tries escaping from him, however, she soon encounters monsters from the Otherworld. She then meets with Claudia, now a high-ranking member of The Order. Claudia tells Heather that they need her, before departing away. Heather then spends the night trying to get back home to her father, having to trek through a nightmare version of the mall, an abandoned subway station, the sewers, and a department building. During her adventure, she meets an eccentric man named Vincent Smith, who claims to be on her side.

Once home, Heather finds her father murdered. She confronts Claudia on the rooftop, the latter admitting to having placed the order to have her father killed. She did it for revenge for what Harry did in the events of the original Silent Hill game, and to make Heather hate her enough to follow her back to Silent Hill. After Claudia leaves and Heather kills the monster responsible for the murder of her father, a remorseful Douglas offers to take Heather to Silent Hill with the intention to kill Claudia.

At Silent Hill, Heather and Douglas split-up, with Heather heading to the hospital under the advice of Vincent. There she meets up with Claudia's father Leonard, who turns out to be a giant monster. She kills the monster, and Vincent then tells Heather to go to the Church, which is past the town's local amusement park. At the park, she encounters an injured Douglas. Leaving him behind, Heather is confronted by an alternate version of herself called Memory of Alessa. After destroying the monster, it turns out the creature was part of Alessa's desire to kill herself to prevent the birth of The Order's God.

Finally reaching the church, Heather meets with Claudia again. She rejects her and the cult's ideals before Claudia escapes again. Deep within the Church, Heather walks into an argument between Claudia and Vincent. Vincent is actually a priest for The Order but does not want God to be born, thus aiding Heather to help kill Claudia. Claudia then stabs Vincent to death. Heather proceeds to feel an agonizing pain in her abdomen. When she was reincarnated, God's fetus was reborn within her. Claudia was nourishing the fetus with Heather's hate for her. However, before God is born, Heather takes out a red pellet from within a necklace her father gave her. The red pellet is actually a demon expelling liquid known as an Aglaophotis, which allows Heather to vomit up the fetus of God. Before she could smash it, Claudia swallows the fetus. Claudia dies, but not before resurrecting The Order's God. Heather is able to kill God, becoming emotional afterward as she thinks about her father.

There are three different endings to Silent Hill 3. The "normal" ending has Heather meet up with Douglas and decides she'll start going by Cheryl from now on. In the "possessed" ending, Heather instead stabs Douglas to death. In the joke "Revenge" ending, Heather goes to her still-living father and tells her what's been happening. Harry, angry with Silent Hill, decided to send out an army of UFOs to destroy the town. In Silent Hill: Homecoming, it is revealed that Douglas exposed The Order to the world, suggesting the "normal" ending is canon.

=== Silent Hill: Origins ===
She was saved by a truck driver named Travis Grady. Using her supernatural powers, Alessa was able to separate her spirit from her body with a ghostly apparition. Due to Alessa's powers and Silent Hill's own connection to the supernatural, an alternate reality known as the Otherworld started seeping into the town. As the apparition, Alessa led Travis across Silent Hill to assemble an artifact called the Flauros. With Flauros, she was able to stop the Order's goal and split her soul into two. She then dropped off half of her soul, which took the appearance of a baby, outside of Silent Hill.

=== Appearances in other games and media ===
In Silent Hill: Shattered Memories, "Heather" is the middle name of the main character Cheryl. Heather is also the lead character in the film Silent Hill: Revelation. Heather is also a downloadable content character in Silent Hill: Book of Memories. In addition, she makes cameo appearances in some of the endings in Book of Memories and in Silent Hill: Downpour, as well as in an unrelated Konami game, Dance Dance Revolution Extreme.

Going by Cheryl, the character also makes a playable appearance in the Dead by Daylight game alongside Pyramid Head, Lisa Garland, Cybil Bennett, Maria, and James Sunderland, along with skins based on Alessa Gillespie and Robbie the Rabbit. In the canon of Dead by Daylight, Heather/Cheryl works at a center for troubled youths, but is still haunted by the events of Silent Hill 3.

Heather is also part of a DLC expansion pack for the multiplayer horror game Dark Deception: Monsters & Mortals – Silent Hill.

== Design and portrayal ==
Heather was initially modeled after French actresses Charlotte Gainsbourg and Vanessa Paradis in several rough sketches. The sketches portrayed her as an "innocent" type of character. The development team realized that she seemed too "nice" and the next version of Heather was inspired by Sophie Marceau and Gainsbourg to give her an attitude. The character designer Shingo Yuri imagined Heather as wearing jeans, but the female team members of Team Silent thought that Heather should show her legs to look more feminine and convinced Yuri. Heather's hair was initially more natural and less elaborate, but the female team members thought that curly hair would be more suitable for a young girl. Heather was given shorter hair for the convenience of video games: it would have taken more processing power of the PlayStation 2 to animate longer realistic hair and the game designers used the processing power towards increasing monster numbers instead. Heather's original design was later used with Elle Holloway, a character in Silent Hill: Homecoming.

Adelaide Clemens as Heather in the film Silent Hill: Revelation

The character's name and model were inspired by her original voice actress, Heather Morris, who was also a motion capture actress, including for combat scenes during which she used her childhood taekwondo training. The creators originally named Heather "Helen", but after talking with Morris they realized that name was old-fashioned and changed it (in early promotional materials and the back of the game's original cover, the character still has the name Heather Morris, same as the actress). Morris said: "I liked the character Heather. She is sort of a bad-ass and a bit of a tomboy. Although she was very young, she was quite fearless and strong. I did respond well to the script. Heather was really interesting and a great character to play. ... Much like the character, Heather, I was learning about all the horrendous things in this video game world as I moved through it. So I was genuinely surprised and disturbed. Very often I would ask to stop the motion capture so we could look on the computer at the images that represented the monsters and people with whom I was supposed to be interacting. And they were creepy and quite scary. Since we were working on a blank stage, we really need to use our imagination."

In contrast to Morris, Adelaide Clemens, who played Heather in Revelation, had to work with physically existing monsters on the film's set. She said "I really took on the role of Heather Mason herself—the psychological journey that she's going on. ... [W]ith the mythology of the game, the gravity of what the monsters are—what they mean; their symbolism, and all of those things—I did research the game, and look into the 'history' of Silent Hill, and what has been created there in the franchise. And, physically! I had to get incredibly strong, and incredibly fit—just really immerse myself in Heather Mason."

== Reception ==
In Silent Hill: The Terror Engine, Bernard Perron wrote that Heather's "temper" and "sharp tongue" served to distinguish her from the female protagonists of the survival-horror games Rule of Rose (2006), Clock Tower 3 (2002), and Fatal Frame (2001), whom he described as being characterized as "more frail or innocent". Game Revolution's Chris Hudak preferred Heather over the prior protagonists of the series, Silent Hill's Harry Mason and Silent Hill 2's James Sunderland, whom he felt were "bland"; he praised her "attitude, some vulnerability and even some snarky teenaged wit". Joystick Division's James Hawkins praised Heather for how she "show[ed] the world that whiny teenage girls can become incredible badasses", putting her on the tenth place of his 2010 list of the top ten "badass ladies" in video game history. That same year, Mania Entertainment's "Briana Lawrence" ranked her fifth on her list of "13 Video Game Women That Kick Ass", calling Heather a "really cool lead character". Schuyler J. Dievendorf of The Escapist included her on his 2014 list of eight "most badass videogame ladies" as she "has gone through hell and become numbed to the nightmare. After seeing the things that she's seen most people would have cracked, but she keeps going."

CNET shared the sentiments, adding she "may not have the toughness of some of the other protagonists here, but Heather Mason is absolutely human and eminently relatable". UGO Networks writers placed the character second on its 2011 list of the best kids in video games, also featuring her on their list of the "most stylin'" alternate costumes for her "Sailor Moon-esque character" Princess Heart costume. In 2013, Complex ranked Heather as the 36th greatest heroine in video game history, stating that they still "love" her "despite the massive pile of fail known as Silent Hill Revelation 3D."

According to Leigh Alexander of GamePro, "for years, video games have struggled to define what constitutes a positive portrayal of women. We've learned what isn't, over our checkered history of anime panty shots, gratuitous cleavage and breast physics. And thanks to the likes of Half-Life 2's Alyx Vance, Beyond Good & Evil's Jade, Silent Hill 3's Heather Morris [sic], and Portal's Chell, we've got some idea of what is." However, one essay in Unraveling Resident Evil criticized Heather as following a "traditional trope" of a "sexless child" similar to the role of "a virgin or tomboy, Rebecca and Claire" in the Resident Evil series of horror games by Capcom, contrasting them with Resident Evil's Ada.
