= Silent Hill (disambiguation) =

Silent Hill is a Japanese horror franchise owned by Konami.

Silent Hill may also refer to:

- Silent Hill (video game), the first game in the series, released in 1999
- Silent Hills, a game cancelled in 2015
- Silent Hill (comics), a 2004-08 comic book series based on the video game series
- Silent Hill (film series), a live action film series based on the video game series
  - Silent Hill (film), the first film in the series, released in 2006
- "Silent Hill" (song), a 2022 song by Kendrick Lamar and Kodak Black
