= Silent Hill: Shattered Memories =

2009 video game

- European cover art
- Developer: Climax Studios
- Publisher: Konami
- Director: Mark Simmons
- Producer: Tomm Hulett
- Designer: Sam Barlow
- Programmer: Dave Owens
- Artist: Neale Williams
- Writer: Sam Barlow
- Composer: Akira Yamaoka
- Series: Silent Hill
- Platforms: Wii; PlayStation 2; PlayStation Portable
- Release: Wii: NA: 8 December 2009; EU: 26 February 2010; JP: 25 March 2010; AU: 22 April 2010; PS2, PSP: NA: 19 January 2010; EU: 26 February 2010; JP: 25 March 2010; AU: 22 April 2010
- Genre: Survival horror
- Mode: Single-player

Silent Hill: Shattered Memories is a 2009 survival horror game developed by Climax Studios and published by Konami. It was released in December for the Wii and ported to the PlayStation 2 and PlayStation Portable platforms in January 2010. In April 2014, it appeared on the PlayStation Network in Europe.

Shattered Memories is a reimagination of the first game and retains the premise—Harry Mason's quest to find his missing daughter in the fictitious American town of Silent Hill—but is set in a different fictional universe and has a different plot, and altered characters, alongside new ones. Five endings are available. Gameplay takes place in two parts: a framing, first-person psychotherapy session, and an over-the-shoulder perspective of Harry's journey through Silent Hill, which is periodically interrupted by the occurrence of a shift to a more dangerous environment. Answers given to the psychological tests in the therapy session affect various gameplay elements in Harry's journey.

After designing the Silent Hill prequel (2007), which intentionally replicated elements of the first installment, Climax Studios wanted to try a different approach to creating a title in the series. Among the changes made was the removal of combat and the constant presence of monsters. Akira Yamaoka composed the soundtrack of the game, which was the first in the series to prominently feature dynamic music.

The game received generally positive reviews for its graphics, plot, voice acting, soundtrack, and its use of the Wii Remote, and has been favorably compared to M. Night Shyamalan's visuals. However, some reviewers found the puzzle exploration, chase sequences and psychological elements frustrating, and felt the game was too short. It has been since praised by some reviewers for its unique take on the franchise, clever twists to the original story, atmosphere and mechanics.

== Gameplay ==
In this screenshot, Harry Mason explores the snowy town of Silent Hill.

Silent Hill: Shattered Memories is a reimagining of the first installment of the series, Silent Hill. It keeps the premise of writer Harry Mason looking for his daughter in Silent Hill after a car crash, although it leads into a different plot. The personalities and roles of characters from the first game have also been changed, and Shattered Memories introduces new characters as well.

Silent Hill: Shattered Memories divides its gameplay between two different settings. The first section is set in a psychotherapist's office and the second in a town called Silent Hill. In the first section, the player interacts with Dr. Michael Kaufmann, who is a therapist NPC, from a first-person perspective. The player responds to Kaufmann's questions and completes a psychological test, fills in a questionnaire or colors pictures. The player's responses to these tests alters aspects of gameplay in the second setting, including the available areas, the physical appearance and behavior of characters encountered, and the physical appearance of the monsters. Shattered Memories returns to Kaufmann's office periodically throughout the game.

In the second setting, the player guides Harry Mason in an over-the-shoulder view as he searches for his missing daughter Cheryl in the snowy town of Silent Hill. Harry is equipped with a smartphone and flashlight: he can use the phone to check his location on a GPS map, take photographs, and make telephone calls. Moving to certain spots with high interference, represented by a lot of radio noise, or by taking pictures of spots where shadowy figures can be seen, unlock various text and voicemail messages that expand the story and occasionally provide clues. To view the details of various documents, the player can zoom in on objects. The game also alters details of gameplay based on what the player views. Throughout his journey, Harry encounters puzzles such as mechanisms, which reward either a key required to progress or a bonus memento. In the Wii version, the Wii Remote is used for puzzle solving and to control the flashlight and cell phone.

The game occasionally shifts to an icy alternate dimension called "Nightmare", where hostile monsters exist. To escape from this dimension, Harry must find a predetermined exit while avoiding the wandering creatures which chase him upon detection. Unlike previous installments in the series, there is no combat element to the gameplay: Harry is weaponless for the entire duration of the game and can only run, hide, slow down the monsters by knocking down objects to block their path, throw off the creatures if they latch onto him, and temporarily ward them off by picking up and using flares found lying on the ground. His running speed and "health" (the amount of damage that he can endure before dying) decrease every time the monsters grab him. In contrast to the previous installments of the series, which featured various types of monsters, Shattered Memories features only one type of humanoid monster, whose physical appearance changes in response to the player's actions inside and outside the Nightmare realm, including their responses to Kaufmann's psychological tests.

== Plot ==
The game begins with a psychotherapy session conducted by Dr. Kaufmann, which acts as a frame story for Harry's quest. Suffering from issues with his memory, Harry travels home to search for his seven-year-old daughter Cheryl, hoping that she is already there. His consciousness moves between the in-game real world and Nightmare—a frozen version of the town in which monsters chase him—and finds that another family lives in his house. Police officer Cybil Bennett arrives and decides to take him to the police station, but they become caught in a blizzard, and Harry eventually leaves her car to continue his search. Eventually, Harry finds his way to the local high school, where he learns from a woman named Michelle Valdez that a Cheryl Mason attended school there previously, but then moved. She offers to drive Harry to Cheryl's new address, but after briefly stepping away, he returns to find Michelle has been replaced by Dahlia Mason, who claims to be Harry's lover and acts as if she has been with him the whole time. He accepts the ride, although during another shift to the Nightmare, the car falls into a river. Harry escapes but loses consciousness.

He awakens in a wheelchair pushed by Cybil in the town's hospital. Before Cybil can tell him about his file at the station, the town transitions to the Nightmare. Harry escapes and meets Lisa Garland, a nurse injured in a crash, and escorts her to her home. At her request, Harry gives Lisa pills for her headache, and returns to find her either dead or dying, depending on in-game actions taken by the player. Finding him next to Lisa's corpse, Cybil attempts to arrest him, but is frozen as the Nightmare emerges around them. Harry escapes to Cheryl's home, where he finds an older Dahlia who claims to be his wife and tells him that Cheryl is at the lighthouse. Harry enters the Nightmare, escapes it, and eventually gets a ride from Michelle. Harry finds a young-again Dahlia aboard a boat at a lakeside harbour, who sets the course for the lighthouse and seduces him. Harry wakes, finds an aged Dahlia and the environment covered in ice, and crosses the now-frozen lake but falls into the water and passes out. Harry is dragged ashore near the lighthouse by Cybil, who confronts him with the news that Harry Mason died eighteen years ago in a car accident. As Harry proceeds, he finds "the lighthouse" is the name of Dr. Kaufmann's counseling clinic: the patient in the therapy session is an adult Cheryl, who is in denial over her father's death. Harry enters the office and Cheryl either reconciles herself to his death or continues to cling to her fantasy father.

At the end of the game, an old video clip from Cheryl's camcorder is played. Four variations of this clip are available depending upon the player's actions as Harry. In "Love Lost", Harry packs his luggage in a car and tells Cheryl not to blame herself for her parents' separation. In "Drunk Dad", a drunken Harry yells at Cheryl, demands a beer and blames his drinking on his family. In "Sleaze and Sirens", Harry flirts on his bed with Lisa and Michelle. In "Wicked and Weak", Dahlia verbally abuses Harry and slaps him. In the "UFO" joke ending, Cheryl tells Dr. Kaufmann that she believes Harry was kidnapped by aliens and that Silent Hill is a spaceship. After James Sunderland interrupts, the therapy session continues, revealing Cheryl to be a dog and Dr. Kaufmann to be an alien. Regardless of the ending, the final scene shows Cheryl packing away mementos that the player can collect throughout the game. An additional scene the player can obtain shows her reconciling with Dahlia outside the clinic.

== Development ==
Plans for a Silent Hill remake, and speculation about a possible remake based on the Silent Hill film, were circulating as early as 2006. The idea of a remake was also considered early in the development of the prequel game Silent Hill: Origins (2007). After the release of Silent Hill: Origins, Climax pitched two ideas to Konami: Brahms PD and Silent Hill: Cold Heart respectively. Brahms PD followed a detective with amnesia in the neighboring town of Brahms looking for their partner, while Silent Hill: Cold Heart would have followed a mentally disturbed college student and replaced the foggy setting of the former games with ice and snow. Elements from both pitches were used to create the basis for Shattered Memories. Rumours persisted into 2009, and were seemingly confirmed in February when the British Board of Film Classification (BBFC) re-rated the original game. The game was officially announced in the May 2009 issue of Nintendo Power.

Climax Studios, the developer of Silent Hill: Origins, developed Shattered Memories with a development team made up of more than 55 members and a supporting network of more than 90 artists. With the completion of Origins - for which they had attempted to closely replicate the atmosphere and gameplay elements of the first Silent Hill game (1999)— Climax Studios wanted to create another horror game. Because of the tenth anniversary of the first Silent Hill installment, Konami thought the time was ideal "to revisit" the game. Climax Studios saw the then-newly introduced Wii platform as a way to reach a wider range of gamers, especially as outside Japan, no Silent Hill title had been exclusively released on a Nintendo platform. Development costs for the Xbox 360 or PlayStation 3 and their gamers' "mindset" factored into the decision for the gaming platform. Additionally, the developers wanted to use the Wii Remote to incorporate the gameplay elements of the flashlight and radio static. Climax felt that the first game would be a good starting point, instead of continuing any existing storylines or adding onto the mythology of the town. To please fans of the series and bring in new ones, they decided to reimagine the setting and characters, such as Dahlia, who was changed from "a haggard old woman" who led the town's cult into a physically attractive young woman. Game designer Sam Barlow explained in November 2022 that he was not a fan of Silent Hill 3 as he disliked the continuation of Harry and Cheryl Mason's adventures as well as the bad endings in Silent Hill. He felt he could redeem the series by reimagining the first game through Shattered Memories.

Climax Studios began with the game's plot, which the development team considered the main appeal of the series. Early in the game's development, some team members visited a psychiatrist for research. The use of ice as a visual theme originated partly because the developers wanted to create an Otherworld for the game, as previous games in the series had featured the same theme as Silent Hill, and because snowfall is common in the northeastern or midwestern United States, where the fictional town is located. Falling snow was added to limit the player's visibility and build an atmosphere of dread. The developers included a system of psychological profiling that adjusted gameplay elements based on the player's interaction with the game. Writer Sam Barlow explained the system: "Ultimately every little thing you do in the game or piece of content you can interact with can be assigned a little personality score. This is all added into a very classical psychometric profile of your personality that can then be mapped onto research". The opening questionnaire has little significance in the player's profile. Capturing the multiple variations of gameplay elements for submission to the Entertainment Software Rating Board proved to be difficult, according to the game's producer, Tomm Hulett. Loading times were eliminated from the game to maintain a sense of immersion for the player.

Hitchcock said that all horror goes back to childhood, that's why it's a universal thing -- it's a fundamental. How many children wake up screaming because they had a dream where they beat up a zombie with a baseball bat? You wake up screaming because you ran and you got caught.

— Lead designer Sam Barlow on the absence of combat in Shattered Memories

The developers felt that creating another game in the series with the same style of gameplay had limited potential. In an attempt to imbue the game with the feel of a horror film where the protagonist is a regular person and the antagonist is powerful, they avoided the common survival horror gameplay feature of a player character who is skilled in the use of weapons. Instead they generated an unarmed player character; and examined the survival horror gameplay staple of difficult combat and sluggish opponents, inspired by zombie films and modelled after the video games Alone in the Dark (1992) and Resident Evil (1996). They also analyzed around 50 chase sequences from various films, including horror films, and the structure of slasher films, in which a powerful and intelligent antagonist pursues the protagonists. The developers drew inspiration from common childhood nightmares about running away from an unknown threat, and decided to incorporate an intelligent enemy capable of trailing and outrunning the protagonist. The chase sequences were designed to evoke a brief sense of tension and fright for the player, although the developers did not want to prolong the tension with the constant presence of monsters, and were concerned that this would become overwhelming and spoil the player's immersion in the game and interest in the story. The constant presence of monsters was also thought to be irrelevant to Shattered Memories; director Mark Simmons said, "this Harry Mason is not a guy who is constantly under attack from monsters. It's not a story of surviving a zombie apocalypse". Additionally, to make information-gathering in the game realistic and corresponding to modern life standards, the developers substituted text in scattered documents, a common element in survival horror games, for the player's interaction with the in-game environment and use of the cell phone.

=== Music ===
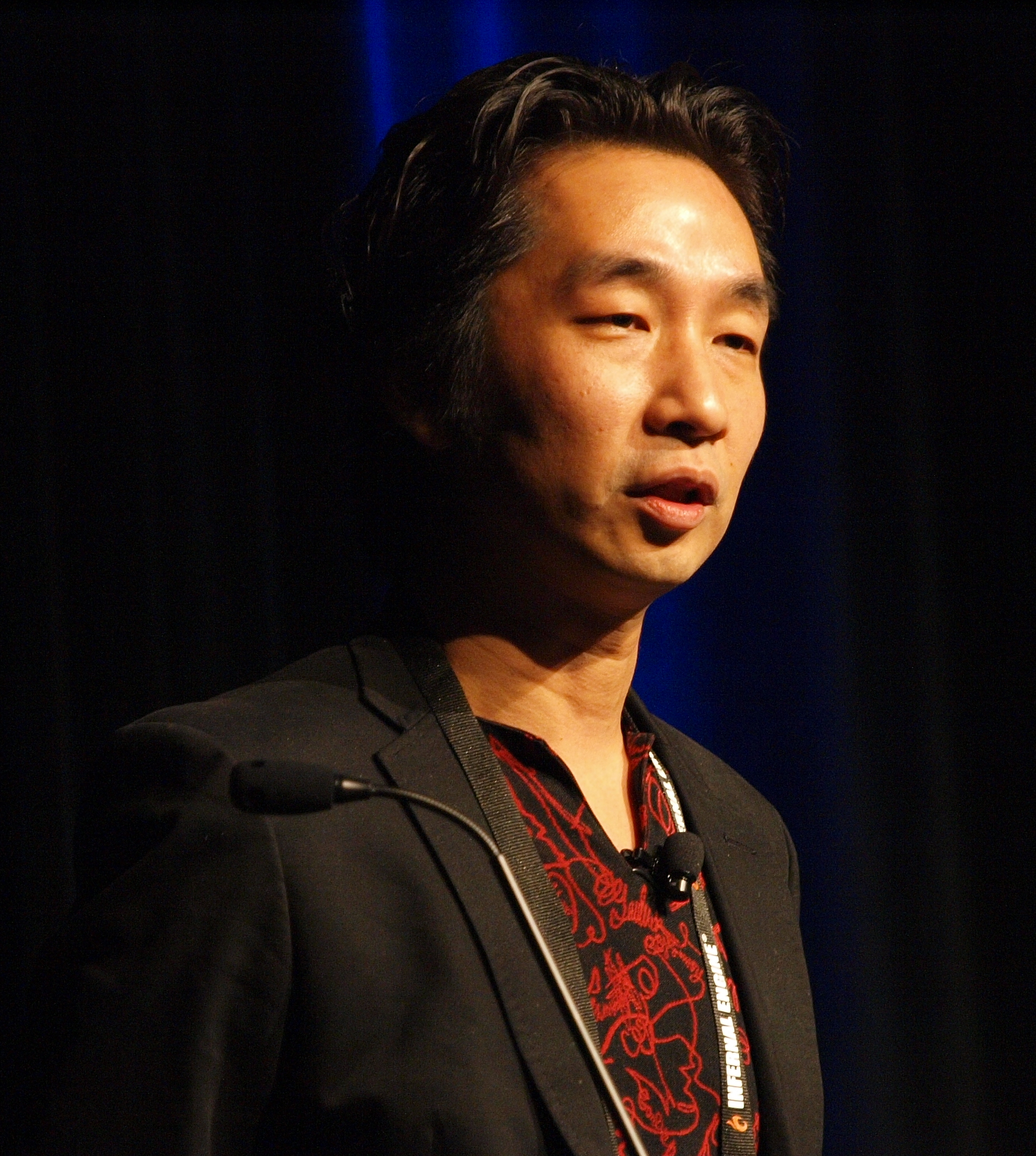
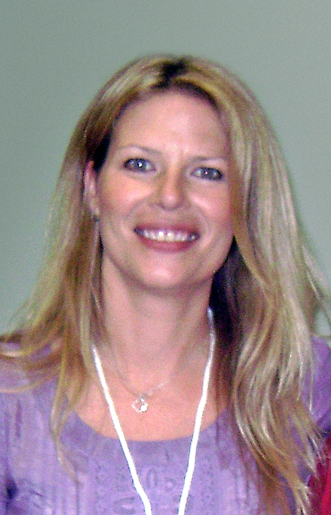
Akira Yamaoka (left) scored Shattered Memories' soundtrack and Mary Elizabeth McGlynn (right) provided vocals for four musical pieces of it.

Silent Hill series composer Akira Yamaoka scored the soundtrack of Shattered Memories. It was his final contribution to the Silent Hill series before he resigned from Konami after 16 years with the company. Voice actress Mary Elizabeth McGlynn provided vocals for four musical pieces included in the game and co-directed Shattered Memories' voice acting, and musician Joe Romersa wrote lyrics for three of the pieces. The game is the first in the series to make prominent use of dynamic music; a composition is introduced and subsequently retracted, based on the player's actions, in every major area of the game. Widely varying compositions, ranging from undertones to rock music, were produced for the game.

== Release ==
A playable demo of Shattered Memories was made available in June 2009 at the annual trade fair Electronic Entertainment Expo 2009 (E3) and received favorable reviews from video game journalists. A group of editors of the IGN website gave the game three "Best of E3" awards in the Wii category for best overall game, best adventure game, and best video game graphics technology. The game was also given a "Best Wii Game" award by editors of the GameSpot website in an article on their preferred games featured at the E3 show.

Shattered Memories was published by Konami for the Wii in North America on 8 December 2009; in Europe on 26 February 2010; and in Japan on 25 March. The Australian release was delayed until 22 June, due to European supply problems caused by the economic effects of the 2010 eruptions of Eyjafjallajökull. Major Australian retailers struggled to confirm available copies of the game for several months after the delayed release, potentially damaging initial sales of the game. The PlayStation 2 and PlayStation Portable versions were published in North America on 19 January 2010; in Europe on 26 February; in Japan on 25 March; and in Australia on 22 April 2010. It also became available on the PlayStation Network for Europe and the United Kingdom on 28 April 2014. A PlayStation Vita release for Shattered Memories was apparently planned, but was cancelled.

== Reception ==
Reception

Aggregate score
Aggregator	Score
Metacritic	79/100 (Wii); 77/100 (PS2); 73/100 (PSP)

Review scores
Publication	Score
1Up.com	C+ (Wii, PS2, PSP)
Famitsu	7/10, 6/10, 7/10, 7/10 (Wii); 7/10, 5/10, 7/10, 7/10 (PS2); 8/10, 8/10, 7/10, 7/10 (PSP)
Game Informer	6.25/10 (Wii)
GamePro	2.5/5(Wii)
GameRevolution	B (Wii)
GameSpot	8/10 (Wii)
GameSpy	3.5/5 (Wii)
GameTrailers	8.5/10 (Wii)
IGN	8.6/10 (Wii); 8.0/10 (PS2); 7.0/10 (PSP)
Nintendo Power	8/10 (Wii)

Awards
Publication	Award
IGN	Editor's Choice
Giant Bomb	Best Ending of 2009
Giant Bomb	Best Wii Game Of 2009
Milthon European Games Awards	Best Audio Design

According to producer Tomm Hulett, the number of pre-ordered copies of Silent Hill: Shattered Memories "looked very good". In March 2010, the game placed fifth on the list of the top forty bestselling PS2 videogames in the United Kingdom and eleventh on the corresponding list for Wii games. However, NintendoWorldReport stated that sales of the game were low. The game eventually broke even with the help of the PS2 port, selling an estimated 440,000 copies across all platforms.

Review aggregator website Metacritic displays an averaged score for Silent Hill: Shattered Memories of 79/100, indicating "generally favorable reviews". Wesley Yin-Poole of VideoGamer.com ranked Shattered Memories in seventh place on his list of "top ten nerve-shredding video games", and wrote: "Dark, dank and dangerous, Silent Hill grabs you by the scruff of the neck, shakes you till you throw up, then headbutts you right between the eyes". Gamasutra's Brandon Sheffield, ranked the game in fifth place on his top ten list of overlooked games of 2009, and wrote that despite the absence of horror elements, the game was a nice experience. Matt Wales of IGN also included the game in a list of overlooked Wii games, and wrote that the combination of various elements which he regarded as positive delivered "a meticulously-constructed, expertly-paced experience quite unlike anything the series has seen before".

Chris Schilling of The Daily Telegraph described it as "one of the most innovative and enjoyable survival horrors for many a year". Eurogamer's Kristan Reed wrote: "Packed with inventive ideas and one engaging sequence after another, it's a spirited, poignant and unsettling game that not only delivers a long-overdue return to form, but reinvigorates horror adventures in the process". According to Lark Anderson of GameSpot, "Shattered Memories is a fantastic return to the core concept of personal fear, and though its developers made some unorthodox decisions - such as removing combat entirely - those decisions have paid off handsomely". Nintendo Power called it audacious and compelling. In a retrospective feature, NintendoWorldReport's Jonathan Metts generally agreed with GameSpot, stating that the installment "is a noble and arguably successful attempt to revive and reform the survival horror genre. While perhaps not scary, it is genuinely disturbing, shocking, and always interesting". According to Leigh Alexander of The A.V. Club, the innovation and uniqueness of the installment made it capable of standing alone from the Silent Hill series, without having to use the series' reputation or name to attract players. Conversely, Game Informer's Tim Turi considered the frustrating controls and dull pacing to be major flaws, and wrote: "If you’re a Silent Hill fan interested in a fresh take on the stale formula, this Wii entry may be the Cheryl you’ve been searching for, but it comes at a cost".

The division of gameplay into puzzle-based exploration, weaponless chase sequences, and therapy scenes drew mixed comments from reviewers. About.com's Charles Herold wrote that the fast-paced action of the nightmare sequences and the therapy scenes undercut the "trapped in a nightmare" feeling of previous Silent Hill games. Matt Casamassina of IGN wrote that "the separation between safe exploration and puzzling and run-for-your-life monster scenarios is too transparent and as a result you will inevitably come to fear the ice and few things else". PALGN's Michael Kontoudis said that the chase sequences severely detracted from the rest of the game. Eurogamer wrote that they created a welcome mix with no gameplay element overemphasized. Reviewers were also divided on whether the chase sequences were potentially frustrating, or quickly grew repetitive. GamesRadar's Henry Gilbert expressed frustration over the similar enemies and repetitive use of a stock scream. Neon Kelly of VideoGamer.com was concerned by the absence of a possible death of the player character which would result in a "game over", because he esteemed the fear potentially caused to the player by player character death as a major element of the survival horror genre. The use of the Wii Remote was praised by reviewers as natural-seeming, and well-suited to the movement-based puzzles and scenes.

Shattered Memories' reimagined plot received praise from reviewers, some of whom found it easier to follow than the plot of the first game. Game Informer drew comparisons with film director M. Night Shyamalan's style. GamesRadar wrote that the storyline and characterizations were mature, its puzzles clear yet challenging and that the atmospheric scares contributed to the game's appeal. Justin Haywald of 1UP.com said that the text messages about minor characters not introduced in the game detracted from the overall narrative. The game's duration, considered relatively short by reviewers, was seen as a drawback, although some reviewers said that the psychological elements and multiple endings increased the replay value of the game. The psychological elements were also criticized. About.com wrote that they were far less subtle than those in Silent Hill 2, and GamePro's Will Herring said that while the player-profiling element was ambitious, he did not think it went far enough, as it changed only cosmetic details and character dialogue. Reviewers praised the graphics, and called them detailed and well-done. Chris McMahon of Play placed the game tenth on his list of the "ten best-looking PSP games". GameTrailers praised the variety of objects, many of which can be manipulated by the player, and the detailed textures which lent the game's environments authenticity. The soundtrack was favorably received, and reviewers described it as moody, atmospheric, and helping to create tension. The voice acting was similarly well-received as believable. Additionally, the soundtrack won an award for its audio design at the Milthon European Games Awards, an event held in Paris, France, at the Paris Game Festival; the awards were handed out by an eight-person jury and the French Minister of Culture and Communication.

Metacritic shows an averaged score of 77/100 for the PlayStation 2 port, indicating generally favorable reviews. Casamassina gave the PS2 port a score of 8.0/10, and wrote that while the graphics and control system in the Wii version were better, the port held up well. For the PlayStation Portable port, Metacritic displays an averaged score of 73/100, indicating "mixed or average reviews". Casamassina gave it a score of 7.0, and commented upon the "obvious visual downgrades", "sluggish controls", and "the inability to directly control and point his flashlight". In his review of both ports, Haywald said that the control systems of both ports worked well, and described them as "a technical triumph".
