= Silent Hill: Revelation =

2012 film by M. J. Bassett

- Theatrical release poster
- Directed by: M. J. Bassett (Note: Credited as "Michael J. Bassett")
- Written by: M. J. Bassett
- Based on: Silent Hill 3 by Konami
- Produced by: Samuel Hadida; Don Carmody
- Starring: Adelaide Clemens; Kit Harington; Deborah Kara Unger; Martin Donovan; Malcolm McDowell; Carrie-Anne Moss; Sean Bean
- Cinematography: Maxime Alexandre
- Edited by: Michele Conroy
- Music by: Akira Yamaoka; Jeff Danna
- Production companies: Alliance Films; Silent Hill 2 DCP Inc.; Davis Films; Konami
- Distributed by: Alliance Films (Canada); Metropolitan Filmexport (France)
- Release dates: 26 October 2012 (Canada); 28 November 2012 (France)
- Running time: 95 minutes
- Countries: Canada; France
- Language: English
- Budget: $20 million
- Box office: $55.9 million

Silent Hill: Revelation (also known as Silent Hill: Revelation 3D) is a 2012 supernatural psychological horror film based on the video game series Silent Hill published by Konami, and is the second installment in the Silent Hill film series. A sequel to Silent Hill (2006), the film was written and directed by M. J. Bassett. It stars Adelaide Clemens, Kit Harington, Martin Donovan, Malcolm McDowell, and Carrie-Anne Moss, with Deborah Kara Unger, Sean Bean, and Radha Mitchell returning from the previous film. The plot follows Heather Mason (Clemens), who, discovering on the eve of her eighteenth birthday that her presumed identity is false, is drawn to the town of Silent Hill.

Talks for a Silent Hill sequel began in December 2006, with Christophe Gans returning to direct and Roger Avary writing. However, after Gans dropped out and Avary was imprisoned for vehicular manslaughter, the project entered development purgatory. Later, in early 2010, Bassett was hired to direct and write, replacing Gans and Avary. On an estimated $20 million budget, filming took place from March to May 2011 in Canada, with the 3D RED Epic camera used for the process; audio mixing took place in France.

Silent Hill: Revelation was released theatrically in North America on October 26, 2012, by Alliance Films and Open Road Films respectively; in France on November 28, by Metropolitan Filmexport. The film grossed over $55.9 million worldwide and received largely negative reviews from critics. A third film, Return to Silent Hill, was released on January 23, 2026.

== Plot ==
Sharon Da Silva and her adoptive father Christopher have spent the past few years moving from town to town and assuming different identities, including the names Heather and Harry Mason. Heather believes that they are on the run from the police because Harry killed a man in self-defense and that her adoptive mother died in a car crash. In fact, he has been protecting her from the Order, a cult of Silent Hill. Rose Da Silva was able to free Sharon from the fog world using one half of a talisman called the Seal of Metatron, but she remains trapped in Silent Hill.

Heather meets fellow student Vincent Cooper, but is haunted by hallucinations of Silent Hill. She is approached by private investigator Douglas Cartland regarding her identity. Heather warns Harry, but he is abducted by the Order and taken to Silent Hill. Unaware of this, Heather goes to a mall to wait for him, entering the mall's Otherworld. Douglas explains he was hired by the Order to find Heather, and decides to help her when he discovers his clients' intentions. A monster, the Missionary, kills Douglas while Heather returns to the real world and flees, leaving her a suspect to Douglas' murder.

Vincent escorts Heather home, where they find a message instructing Heather to go to Silent Hill, and Heather reads a letter from her father detailing the truth of her background. Heather and Vincent travel to the town, but stop at a motel, where Vincent reveals that he is the son of the Order's leader Claudia Wolf, and was sent by her to ensure Heather came of her own volition to Silent Hill. He reveals that Heather is a part of Alessa Gillespie, a girl whose immolation 38 years earlier by the Order created the town's shifting dimensions. The resulting argument triggers a shift to the Otherworld. The Missionary grabs Vincent, but not before he tells Heather to find his grandfather Leonard, who possesses the other half of the Seal of Metatron.

Heather ventures into the fog dimension to find her father. She encounters Alessa's mother Dahlia, who reveals that Claudia intends to complete the purpose intended for Alessa at her burning. After a shift to the Otherworld, Heather finds Leonard who, after informing her that the Seal of Metatron will reveal "the true nature of things", fuses Heather's half of the amulet with the one he possesses and becomes a monster. After being knocked out and carried off, Heather regains consciousness and grabs the amulet from within his body, killing Leonard. As she runs away, she summons Pyramid Head, the entity created to protect Alessa (and by extension Heather), with her pleading and hides from him. Shortly after, she witnesses Vincent being taken away by the Order after being deemed insane by Claudia for betraying them.

Heather saves Vincent and they go to Lakeside Amusement Park where the Order's sanctuary is hidden. Dark Alessa, the manifestation of Alessa's wrath, confronts Heather who embraces her counterpart, absorbing her, and making Alessa complete once again. Heather confronts Claudia, who is holding Christopher and Vincent hostage. Claudia explains that Alessa's destiny was to be the incubator for a deity worshiped by the Order, who would punish all sinners upon its birth, completing Heather's destiny as well. (Note: In Silent Hill, the Brethren burned Alessa as a witch due to her being born out of wedlock. In Revelation, the Brethren are members of the Order.) Remembering Leonard's words, Heather gives Claudia the Seal of Metatron, revealing her to be the Missionary. Heather summons Pyramid Head, who kills the Missionary, allowing Heather to rescue Vincent and Christopher.

As the fog fades from the town, Christopher decides to stay in Silent Hill to find and free Rose, leaving Heather and Vincent to care for each other. They hitch a ride in a truck driven by Travis Grady. Travis mentions to Heather and Vincent that they were lucky as he had not been driving in that direction for a long time. A couple of police cars, followed by a prison transport, enter the area of Silent Hill, which is then consumed by the fog.

== Cast ==
- Adelaide Clemens as Heather Mason / Sharon Da Silva, the troubled adoptive daughter of Rose and Christopher Da Silva, who has been running away from Silent Hill with Christopher for six years; and as Dark Alessa, in teenaged form, the tormented daughter of Dahlia Gillespie, who was severely burned by the Order of Valtiel and exacted revenge on them.
- Kit Harington as Vincent Smith, a classmate of Heather and secretly a member of the Order of Valtiel and the son of Claudia Wolf, sent to take Heather to Silent Hill.
- Sean Bean as Harry Mason / Christopher Da Silva, the adoptive father of Heather/Sharon, who has been keeping Heather/Sharon's true identity and memories a secret out of protection for six years.
- Carrie-Anne Moss as Claudia Wolf, the priestess of the Order of Valtiel, sister of Christabella and Dahlia, daughter of Leonard, mother of Vincent, and the main antagonist of the film, who holds Christopher captive.
  - Liise Keeling as The Missionary, Claudia’s monster form, revealed after she touches the Seal of Metatron.
- Malcolm McDowell as Leonard Wolf, the grandfather of Vincent and father of Claudia, who was chained down and abandoned by the Order of Valtiel.
- Martin Donovan as Douglas Cartland, a detective hired by Claudia to spy on Sharon and Vincent to capture them.
- Deborah Kara Unger as Dahlia Gillespie, the ragged and depressed biological mother of Alessa Gillespie, who wanders through the foggy dimension of Silent Hill.
- Radha Mitchell as Rose Da Silva, the adoptive mother of Sharon and wife to Christopher, who is trapped in the foggy dimension of Silent Hill after the events of the first film.
- Heather Marks as Suki, a girl who took a wrong turn and got lost in the foggy dimension of Silent Hill.
- Roberto Campanella as Pyramid Head, a humanoid monster wearing a triangular shaped helmet who protects Sharon and Alessa.
- Erin Pitt as Young Alessa Gillespie, the tormented daughter of Dahlia Gillespie, who was severely burned by the Order of Valtiel and exacted revenge on them; and as the younger Sharon Da Silva, along with Dark Alessa, who is seen frequently haunting Heather.
- Peter Outerbridge as Travis Grady, a character from Silent Hill: Origins who makes a cameo near the end of the film.

== Production ==
=== Absence of Christophe Gans and Roger Avary (2006–2010) ===
In December 2006, Silent Hill writer/director Christophe Gans announced that Sony had officially ordered another installment in the Silent Hill film series. Gans stated that he would like to return to the franchise, if his commitment to Onimusha did not bar him from participating. Gans also confirmed that Roger Avary would be back to write the script.

In 2007, producer Don Carmody stated that a screenplay was slowly being developed and that "[Gans is] involved pretty heavily in another project right now" and would likely not return as director. As well, Avary said that he would not be returning to collaborate on the next film on the account that Gans would not be returning, either. In September 2009, Sony Pictures announced that Roger Avary and producer Samuel Hadida were officially signed on the project and that filming would begin in 2010. Hadida stated that production would begin upon completion of Resident Evil: Afterlife. However, later that month, Roger Avary was sentenced to a 1-year jail term for vehicular manslaughter, and was unable to participate in the film's production.

In November 2009, Carmody told Shock Till You Drop that Gans was unlikely to return for the sequel, and that they were going to make the sequel "more accessible to a wider audience". Carmody stated that the film would feature a character from the first movie who is now older, implying that Sharon Da Silva or Alessa Gillespie would be returning, although actress Jodelle Ferland announced that she had not been contacted for the role.

In August 2010, Carmody said the sequel had "stalled" due to Avary's imprisonment, but that he still wanted to be involved with the film and had a basic outline for it.

=== M. J. Bassett's involvement (2010–present) ===
In November 2010, it was announced that Lionsgate had begun pre-sales on the next installment and that M. J. Bassett would direct the film, titled Silent Hill: Revelation 3D. Bassett revealed she had written her own screenplay, replacing Roger Avary. She added that she would bring back as many of the core creative team as she could from the first film to keep its look and feel, but add "more darkness and fear into the mix as well".

On July 14, 2012, M. J. Bassett appeared at San Diego Comic-Con. She showed two clips from the movie. The first was a short clip showing the Mannequin Monster, and the second showed Vincent tied to an operating table surrounded by Nurses. A movie trailer was released later that month, and from then on, more TV spots, posters and promotional stills were released in anticipation of the film.

=== Direction ===
Bassett has stated that while Silent Hill 3 would have been the best game to adapt, Revelation is a sequel to the first film first and foremost, and still needed to make sense with what the first film had established, such as the mythology and relations between characters. People who watched the film expecting "Silent Hill 3: The Movie" would be disappointed in that it differed from the game in many places, as it took different directions in many areas. The film was supposed to be a sequel to the first film that used Silent Hill 3 as groundwork.

Despite this, there were supposed to be many nods to the games that only gamers would catch, and the way many scenes were shot in the film were supposed to be reminiscent of Silent Hill 3, such as the cinematography of the carousel scene.

In a 2018 podcast interview with The Movie Crypt, Bassett spoke about her feelings towards the film. She said it felt more like a collaboration and did not have complete control, but since she wrote and directed it, she admits many aspects of its failings are also hers. She felt like she had to satisfy either the gamers or the audience; it was impossible to do both. Shooting in 3D was a pain, and she felt obligated to claim it was a great movie for the press, but in the back of her mind, she did not wholeheartedly agree. She wished she had stood up for her vision of the movie and for the fans. She regretted trying to tie the game and film canons together, as it created contradictions and retcons. She apologized to everyone who did not like the movie.

=== Casting ===
Before filming began, Bassett was open to suggestions in casting the woman to play Heather, allowing fans to post the names of actresses on her blog that they believed could play her, provided that the actress could realistically portray an eighteen-year-old and had experience in other films. Adelaide Clemens was eventually chosen for the role of Heather, though no one had suggested her. Bassett made another post asking for suggestions for Claudia's actress and some fans suggested Donna Burke, who had provided the voice and motion capture for the character in Silent Hill 3, but Bassett was disappointed by the suggestions, feeling it was not a "very imaginative selection", and removed the post.

Kit Harington acknowledged Vincent's character had been changed from the game version in order to give some leeway as a support character for Heather. Heather was somewhat less of a "smartass" to give her a more realistic personality. Bassett was interested in a character who shows "some genuine human responses to the terrible things she experiences."

Original cast, including Radha Mitchell, Sean Bean, Deborah Kara Unger, and Roberto Campanella were all contacted to reprise their characters, which they accepted. Bean admitted that he was confused with the name change.

=== Filming ===
In March 2011, the production team began filming in Cambridge, Ontario, Canada. Production was delayed when a freak snowstorm hit the set in Cambridge on March 23, 2011. On May 15, 2011, Bassett announced that filming had ended and was in post-production. It was eventually announced that the film would be released on October 26, 2012, by Open Road Films.

Principal photography began in Toronto, Ontario, Canada on 7 March 2011 and wrapped in May 2011, with the 3D RED Epic camera used for the process. Street and bridge scenes were shot in Galt from 21 to 26 March, and scenes set at Silent Hill's Lakeside Amusement Park were filmed at the Cherry Beach park on 7 April 2011. The final theatrical mix for the film was completed on 2 February 2012. The film's audio mixing took place in Paris and was handled by a team of six people.

=== Sound design and music ===
In 2009, video game artist Masahiro Ito, who participated in the development of multiple installments of the Silent Hill series of video games, was asked to design the creatures and the look of the "Otherworld" dimension featured in the film, but declined the offer because of other obligations. Jeff Danna and Akira Yamaoka composed the film's soundtrack, through much of Yamaoka's contribution was made up of cues from the game series which were remixed by Danna. Yamaoka composed three new pieces of music for the film, including the official theme of the film "Silent Scream" which Mary Elizabeth McGlynn sung .

The image song for the Japanese version is "Claymore" by Gackt.

== Release ==
Silent Hill: Revelation had its premiere in Hong Kong on October 25, 2012. It was theatrically released in the U.S. through Open Road Films on October 26, 2012. Two clips were screened at San Diego Comic-Con in 2012, and a trailer was issued on July 27, 2012. The film was released direct-to-video in Australia on March 6, 2013.

== Reception ==
=== Box office ===
Silent Hill: Revelation opened at #5 at the box office, taking in a weekend number of $8 million, and grossed a total of $55,975,672 worldwide.

=== Critical response ===
On the review aggregator website Rotten Tomatoes, 8% of 61 critics' reviews are positive, with an average rating of 3.2/10. The website's consensus reads: "Mediocre effort even by the standards of video game adaptations, Silent Hill: Revelation 3D features weak characters and an incomprehensible plot with a shortage of scares." Metacritic, which uses a weighted average, assigned the film a score of 16 out of 100, based on 14 critics, indicating "overwhelming dislike". Audiences polled by CinemaScore gave the film an average grade "C" on an A+ to F scale.

Dennis Harvey of Variety said that Silent Hill: Revelation 3D is a "cheaper, cheesier sequel that's worse than its predecessor on every level (save being a half-hour shorter) and takes no special advantage of the stereoscopic process." Andy Webster of The New York Times criticized its poorly written characters and plot, which he considered "thumbnail sketches at best", and stated that the film "reduces its human players to plastic action figures in tired genre settings." Kenneth Brown of Blu-ray.com expressed that "Revelation is terrible. [...] Every time Maxime Alexandre's cinematography and the sequel's rusty boiler room atmosphere delivers, every time writer/director Michael J. Bassett [...] transplants a still-beating heart from the Silent Hill videogame [sic] series that's genuinely chilling, the film descends into direct-to-video mediocrity".

== Reboot ==
In October 2012, M. J. Bassett stated that if she was to make a sequel, instead of adapting from an existing game, she would prefer to use the stories in the graphic novel adaptations.

In January 2020, Christophe Gans told French magazine Allocine that he was in the process of writing a new screenplay based on the Silent Hill series. He stated the production of his previous Silent Hill film was a beautiful memory for him and he chose not return for Revelation because his vision did not match that of the producers. He told the next film could be set in a small American town ruled over by Puritanism. According to Gans, Konami felt galvanized by the success of Capcom's Resident Evil 2 remake and greenlit the film as part of an initiative to get Silent Hill back into the public consciousness. In June 2022, Gans stated that he finished the script under Konami's supervision and clarified that it is not a direct sequel to the 2006–2012 film series and that his sensibilities had evolved since the release of the first film:

"Silent Hill is a bit like Twilight Zone, the Fourth Dimension, a place where anything and everything can happen. I worked on a new Silent Hill which is a Silent Hill of the year 2023 and not a Silent Hill as I imagined it in 2006. It is clear that today's horror cinema no longer resembles the horror cinema of 2006. Good for that matter. Not that 2007 horror cinema wasn't good, but every genre is going through an evolution. I'm trying to take into account what I've been able to see recently, which is more original and more surprising in terms of horror films, and to see if in Silent Hill there are the seeds, or even the expression of that. Silent Hill has always been a game beyond the norm and ahead of its time."

By October 2022, the film was officially green-lit with the title of Return to Silent Hill. It is based on the story from the Silent Hill 2 video game, and principal photography commenced in April 2023.

== See also ==
- List of films based on video games
