= Silent Hill (video game) =

1999 video game

- North American cover art
- Developer: Team Silent
- Publisher: Konami
- Director: Keiichiro Toyama
- Producer: Gozo Kitao
- Programmer: Akihiro Imamura
- Writer: Keiichiro Toyama
- Composer: Akira Yamaoka
- Series: Silent Hill
- Platform: PlayStation
- Release: NA: February 23, 1999; JP: March 4, 1999; EU: July 16, 1999
- Genre: Survival horror
- Mode: Single-player

Silent Hill (Note: Japanese: サイレントヒル, Hepburn: Sairento Hiru) is a 1999 survival horror video game developed by Konami's Team Silent and published by Konami for the PlayStation. It is the first installment in the Silent Hill video game series. The game follows Harry Mason as he searches for his missing adopted daughter in the eponymous fictional American town of Silent Hill. Stumbling upon a cult conducting a rite to revive a deity it worships, he discovers her true origin. Five game endings are possible, depending on the actions taken by the player, including one joke ending.

Unlike earlier survival horror games that used pre-rendering backgrounds, Silent Hill uses a third-person view with real-time rendering of 3D environments. To mitigate the limitations of the console hardware, developers used distance fog and darkness to obscure the graphics and omit pop-ins, which, in turn, helped establish the game's atmosphere and mystery. The player character of Silent Hill is an "everyman", unlike survival horror games focused on protagonists with combat training.

Silent Hill received positive reviews from critics upon its release and was commercially successful. It is considered by many to be one of the greatest video games ever made, as well as a defining title in the survival horror genre, moving away from the elements of the B movie horror genre to more psychological horror, emphasizing atmosphere. Various adaptations and expansions of Silent Hill have been released, including a 2001 visual novel, the 2006 feature film Silent Hill, and a 2009 reimagining of the game titled Silent Hill: Shattered Memories. The game was followed by Silent Hill 2 in 2001; a direct sequel, Silent Hill 3, in 2003; and a prequel, Silent Hill: Origins, in 2007. A remake by Bloober Team is in development.

== Gameplay ==
Harry's flashlight is the sole light source for the majority of the game.

The player's objective is to guide the main protagonist and player character, Harry Mason, through a monster-filled town as he searches for his lost daughter, Cheryl. Silent Hill's gameplay consists of combat, exploration, and puzzle-solving. The game uses a third-person view, with the camera occasionally switching to other angles for dramatic effect in pre-scripted areas. This approach differs from older survival horror games, which frequently shifted through various camera angles using pre-rendered backgrounds. Since Silent Hill has no heads-up display, the player must consult a separate menu to check Harry's "health" in similar traits of early Resident Evil titles.

Harry confronts monsters in each area using both melee weapons and firearms. Being an ordinary man, Harry cannot sustain many blows from enemies and gasps for breath after sprinting. His inexperience with firearms means that his aim, and therefore the player's targeting of enemies, is often unsteady. A portable radio collected early in the game alerts Harry to the presence of nearby creatures with bursts of static, although players can choose to turn off the radio if they prefer.

The player is encouraged to locate and collect maps of each area as soon as possible. These maps, stylistically similar to tourist maps, make navigating the game world easier. Accessible from the menu and readable only when sufficient light is present, each map is marked with places of interest. Visibility is mostly low due to fog and darkness; the latter is prevalent in the "Otherworld". The player finds a flashlight early in the game, which illuminates only a short distance. Like the radio, the player can choose to turn off the flashlight, making the game darker but causing monsters to have a more difficult time finding the player. Navigating through Silent Hill requires the player to find keys and solve puzzles.

== Plot ==
Silent Hill opens with a flashback, showing Harry Mason and his wife finding an abandoned child in a casket. The scene then shifts to Harry driving to the town of Silent Hill with his adopted daughter, Cheryl, for a vacation. Along the way, he notices a police officer driving toward the town, whose bike he later sees crashed on the side of the road. At the town's edge, he swerves to avoid hitting a girl on the road, which causes him to crash and lose consciousness. Upon waking up in town, Harry discovers that Cheryl is missing, and he sets out to look for her. Silent Hill is deserted and foggy, with snow falling out of season. He follows Cheryl through the fog and into an alley, where the environment suddenly darkens and he begins to discover gruesome remains. Harry goes deeper into the alley as reality shifts to a metallic, rusty environment and is eventually surrounded and seemingly killed by hostile creatures.

He then wakes up inside a diner where he meets Cybil Bennett, the same police officer he saw earlier, who has come from a neighboring town to investigate the mysterious occurrences. She gives Harry a gun before leaving. Harry finds a clue that Cheryl is at the local school. While investigating, he is transported back to the "Otherworld" and has to defeat a creature before returning to the normal world. As Harry leaves the school, he hears bells ringing and follows the sound to an old church.

There, he meets Dahlia Gillespie, a cultist, who gives him the Flauros, a charm she claims can counteract the darkness spreading through the town. Harry leaves the church and investigates the hospital, where he encounters its director, Dr. Michael Kaufmann, who is bewildered by the sudden changes in the town. Harry also discovers a frightened, amnesiac nurse named Lisa Garland hiding in one of the rooms. While investigating the hospital, Harry begins to question his own existence, wondering whether he is already dead and everything is happening in his mind. Harry asks Lisa to come with him, but she feels she must stay in the hospital.

Harry meets Cybil again and comes to believe that a darkness is transforming the town into someone's nightmare, causing the inhabitants to disappear. Cybil suspects that Dahlia might be under the influence of drugs. Dahlia urges Harry to stop "the demon" responsible—the girl on the road who appears sporadically—or Cheryl will die. Continuing his search, Harry is drawn into a confrontation with Cybil, who has become host to a supernatural parasite; if the player collected the "unknown liquid" in the hospital, she can be saved, but otherwise Harry must kill her to proceed. The next time Harry sees the girl, the Flauros automatically activates and neutralizes her telekinetic powers. Dahlia appears and reveals that she manipulated Harry into capturing the girl—an apparition of her daughter, Alessa. Harry passes out.

He awakens in the hospital, next to Lisa. Lisa explains that she experienced a sense of déjà vu while in the basement, and when he finds her again, she despairs that she is "the same as them." She pleads with Harry to save her and desperately grabs him, causing Harry to instinctively push her away as blood starts to run down her face; horrified, he flees. Blocking the door outside, he hears Lisa crying, prompting him to re-enter the room. Her diary is all that remains, revealing that she nursed Alessa during a secret, forced hospitalization. Alessa's never-healing wounds terrified her, and she fell deeper into a drug addiction fueled by Kaufmann. Finding Dahlia with Alessa's defeated apparition and charred body, Harry demands to know Cheryl's whereabouts. He learns that seven years earlier, Dahlia conducted a rite to force Alessa to birth the cult's deity. Alessa survived being immolated because her status as a vessel rendered her immortal, while her mental resistance to the rite caused her soul to be bisected, preventing the birth. One half manifested as the infant Cheryl, whom Harry and his wife adopted. Dahlia cast a spell to lure Cheryl back, while Alessa was imprisoned in the hospital, enduring unceasing agony from her injuries. With Alessa's plan thwarted and her soul rejoined, the deity is revived and possesses her.

=== Endings ===
Five different endings are available, depending on the player's previous actions:

- In the "Bad" ending, the player has allowed Cybil to die while not following Kaufmann via side-quest, leaving his fate unclear. The deity merges with Alessa and electrocutes Dahlia before attacking Harry. He defeats it, and Cheryl's voice thanks him but then says goodbye. Overcome by grief, Harry collapses to his knees and the screen fades to black. The next scene shows his corpse in his wrecked car, implying that the entire game was a dying dream.
- In the "Bad +" ending, the player has saved Cybil, but not followed Kaufmann. It is largely similar to the "Bad" ending, except instead of ending after Harry collapses, Cybil approaches him and slaps him back to his senses, telling him to flee. The two stand in silence as fire falls from the sky.
- In the "Good" ending, the player has followed Kaufmann, but not saved Cybil. To complete the side-quest, the player must go to the bar to meet Kaufmann, where Harry rescues him from getting killed by a monster. The player then explores the Resort Area, where they discover the evidence of Kaufmann's involvement in local drug trafficking, and find his hidden bottle of aglaophotis, a supernatural liquid that can exorcise demons. After completing the side-quest, Kaufmann, feeling betrayed by Dahlia, demands that she restore the town to normal and uses aglaophotis to exorcise the deity from Alessa. Harry defeats the deity, and Alessa gives him an infant, the reincarnation of herself and Cheryl. She helps him escape from her nightmare realm before dying. In this ending, Harry is still carrying the infant at midnight, leaving without Cybil.
- In the "Good +" ending, the player has followed Kaufmann and saved Cybil. It is largely similar to the "Good" ending, except Harry escapes with Cybil as well. In both "Good" endings, a bloody and vengeful Lisa prevents Kaufmann from escaping with Harry.
- The "Joke" ending, also known as the "UFO" ending, features extraterrestrials abducting Harry. To achieve this ending, the player must obtain the "Channeling Stone", which is only available on subsequent playthroughs, and optionally use it in four specific undisclosed locations until the player has reached the top of the lighthouse, where the stone is used for the last time.

== Development ==
=== Design ===
Silent Hill was originally supposed to be a video game adaptation of Stephen King's The Mist, the game's director Keiichiro Toyama traveled to America for negotiating the rights, but there were a lot of obstacles so it ended up as an original game. Development of Silent Hill began in September 1996 with 15 people working on the game over 2.5 years. The game was created by Team Silent, a group of staff members within the Konami Computer Entertainment Tokyo studio. Konami aimed to produce a game that would be successful in the United States, which led to a Hollywood-like atmosphere for Silent Hill. According to composer Akira Yamaoka, the developers were uncertain about how to proceed with the project. As time passed, both the personnel and management of Konami lost faith in the game, and the members of Team Silent increasingly felt like outsiders. Despite the profit-oriented approach of the parent company, the developers of Silent Hill had considerable artistic freedom, as the game was produced in an era of lower-budget 2D titles. Eventually, the development staff decided to disregard Konami's initial plan and instead create a game that would appeal to the emotions of players.

To achieve this, the team introduced a "fear of the unknown" as a psychological type of horror. The plot was intentionally made vague and occasionally contradictory to leave its true meaning in the dark, encouraging players to reflect on unexplained elements. Director Keiichiro Toyama created the game's scenario, while programmer Hiroyuki Owaku wrote the text for the riddles. Toyama, who did not have much experience with horror movies, was influenced by UFOs, the occult, and the works of David Lynch, which affected the game's development. Toyama questioned Konami's decision to appoint him as director, as he had never directed a game before Silent Hill.

The localization company Latina International translated the script into English. The town of Silent Hill is an interpretation of a small American community as imagined by the Japanese team, drawing inspiration from Western literature, films, and depictions of American towns in European and Russian culture. The game's joke ending was inspired by a suggestion box created to find alternative explanations for the events in Silent Hill.

Artist Takayoshi Sato corrected inconsistencies in the plot and designed the game's cast of characters. As a young employee, Sato was initially limited to basic tasks such as font design and file sorting. He also created 3D demos and presentations and taught older staff members the fundamentals of 3D modeling. However, his contributions went uncredited, as he lacked the same level of respect within Konami as the more senior employees. Sato eventually approached the company's higher-ups with a short demo movie he had rendered and threatened to withhold his technical knowledge unless he was assigned to 3D work. His supervisor relented, allowing Sato to work on character designs. Instead of relying on illustrations, Sato conceived the characters of Silent Hill while creating their computer-generated models. He gave each character distinctive features but made Harry almost completely neutral to avoid imposing specific interpretations on the players. Creating the skull shapes for the faces of the American cast was challenging because Sato had no Caucasian co-workers to use as reference. Despite being largely responsible for the game's cinematics and characters, his supervisor still hesitated to fully credit his work, intending to assign a visual supervisor to oversee him. To prevent this, Sato volunteered to create the full-motion videos of Silent Hill by himself. Over two and a half years, he lived in the development team's office, using approximately 150 Unix-based computers to render scenes after his coworkers left for the day.

Sato estimated that the game's budget was lower than that of Japan's biggest games at the time. He stated that the development team intended to make Silent Hill a masterpiece rather than a traditional sales-oriented game, opting for an engaging story that would endure over time, similar to successful literature. The game debuted at the 1998 Electronic Entertainment Expo in Atlanta, Georgia, where presentations of movies and in-game scenes received applause from the audience. This favorable reception convinced Konami to allocate more personnel and public relations efforts to the project. Konami later showcased Silent Hill at the European Computer Trade Show in London and included a demo with its stealth game Metal Gear Solid in Japan.

The names and designs of some Silent Hill creatures and puzzles are based on books enjoyed by the character Alessa, including The Lost World by Arthur Conan Doyle and Lewis Carroll's Alice's Adventures in Wonderland. The game contains several real-life references, particularly in character names. Cheryl Mason's first name is based on actress Sheryl Lee, and Lisa Garland's surname is taken from actress Judy Garland. "Michael Kaufmann" combines the first name of Troma Studios producer Michael Herz and the surname of producer Lloyd Kaufmann. Alessa's original name was "Asia", and Dahlia's was "Daria", after actresses Asia Argento and Daria Nicolodi—Argento's mother. Harry's name was initially "Humbert", and Cheryl's was "Dolores", referencing the protagonist and title character of Vladimir Nabokov's novel Lolita. The American staff altered these names, considering them too uncommon. Fictitious religious items in the game drew inspiration from various religions: the spirit-dispelling substance Aglaophotis is based on a similarly named herb in the Kabbalah (Jewish mysticism); the "Seal of Metatron" (also referred to by Dahlia as the "Mark of Samael") references the angels Metatron and Samael; and the name "Flauros" was taken from a demon in the Lemegeton, a book of magic attributed to Solomon. Certain items and doors in the "nowhere" dimension were given names based on occult elements to symbolize magical traits of Dahlia. The names of these doors, taken from angels Ophiel, Hagith, Phaleg, and Bethor—who appear in medieval black magic texts—were used to signify deeper entry into Alessa's mind, according to Owaku.

=== Music ===
Silent Hill

Soundtrack album by Akira Yamaoka
- Released: March 5, 1999
- Genres: Dark ambient; industrial; video game soundtrack
- Length: 71:48

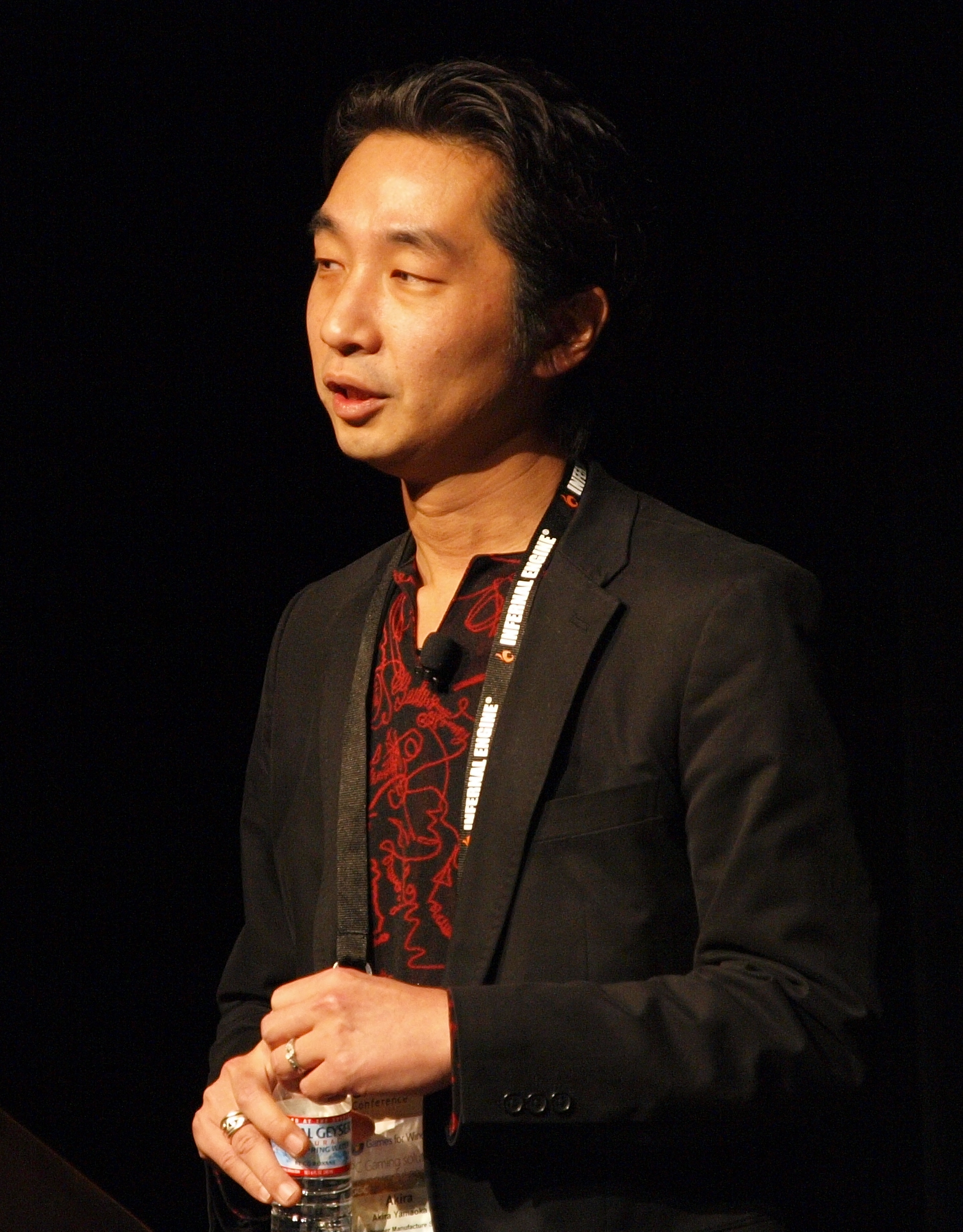
Akira Yamaoka requested to compose the soundtrack for Silent Hill after the original musician decided to leave the development team.

The soundtrack for Silent Hill was composed by sound director Akira Yamaoka, who requested to join the development team after the original musician left. In addition to the music, he was responsible for sound effect creation and audio mastering. Yamaoka did not watch game scenes but instead created the music independently from the visuals. His compositions were influenced by Angelo Badalamenti, the composer for Twin Peaks. To differentiate Silent Hill from other games and to give it a cold, rusty feel, Yamaoka chose industrial music. When he presented his compositions to the staff for the first time, they mistook the sound for a game bug. Yamaoka explained that the noise was intentional for the music, and the team only withdrew their objections after he elaborated on his reasons for this style.

On March 5, 1999, the album Silent Hill Original Soundtracks was released in Japan. The 41st track, the ending theme "Esperándote", was composed by Rika Muranaka. After Yamaoka approached her to create a piece of music for the game, she suggested using bandoneóns, violins, and a Spanish-speaking singer. It was decided to make the song a tango, and Muranaka composed the melody for English lyrics she had conceived. When she arrived in Buenos Aires, Argentina, to record the translated Spanish lyrics with Argentine singer Vanesa Quiroz, Muranaka found that the syllables no longer matched the melody, and she had to recompose it in five minutes.

On October 29, 2013, Perseverance Records released a "Best Of" album featuring 16 newly interpreted instrumental tracks composed by Akira Yamaoka and arranged and performed by Edgar Rothermich. The 17th track on the album is the ballad "I Want Love", performed by Romina Arena.

== Release ==
Silent Hill was released for the PlayStation in 1999, with launch dates spanning from February to July in North America, Japan, and Europe. In 2006, it was included in the Silent Hill Complete Set in Japan. Silent Hill became available for download from the European PlayStation Network store for the PlayStation 3 and PlayStation Portable on March 19, 2009. However, two days later, the game was removed due to "unforeseen circumstances". On September 10, 2009, Silent Hill was released on the North American PlayStation Network. and it was re-released on the European PlayStation Network on October 26, 2011.

== Adaptations ==
A visual novel adaption of the first Silent Hill game titled Play Novel Silent Hill was released for the Game Boy Advance on March 21, 2001.

A film adaptation, also titled Silent Hill, was released on April 21, 2006. Directed by Christophe Gans, the film was loosely based on the game, incorporating elements from Silent Hill 2, Silent Hill 3, and Silent Hill 4: The Room. Gans replaced Harry Mason with a female protagonist, Rose Da Silva, believing that Harry possessed qualities typically perceived as feminine. When designing the film's visual elements, Gans was influenced by directors Michael Mann, David Lynch, and David Cronenberg. The film's soundtrack featured music composed by Akira Yamaoka. Although critical reception was mostly negative, the film was a financial success and was praised by fans, particularly for its visuals.

A "reimagining" of Silent Hill, titled Silent Hill: Shattered Memories, was developed by Climax Studios and published by Konami Digital Entertainment. The game was released on December 8, 2009, for the Wii and on January 19, 2010, for the PlayStation 2 and PlayStation Portable, to mostly positive reviews. While it retains the premise of a man's search for his missing daughter, Shattered Memories branches off into a different plot with altered characters. It features psychological profiling, which alters various in-game elements based on the player's responses during therapy sessions, lacks the combat seen in Silent Hill, and replaces the "Otherworld" with a series of chase sequences through an alternate frozen version of the town.

A remake by Bloober Team was announced to be in development in February 2025 after they signed an agreement with Konami, which was a remake in June 2025. It is reportedly being developed under "Project Noise" with a tentative release year in 2027.

== Reception and legacy ==
Reception

Aggregate score
Aggregator	Score
Metacritic	86/100

Review scores
Publication	Score
AllGame	4.5/5
Edge	8/10
Famitsu	9/10, 9/10, 8/10, 8/10
GamePro	4.5/5
GameRevolution	B+
GameSpot	8.2/10
Hyper	90%
IGN	9/10
Next Generation	5/5
PlayStation: The Official Magazine	10/10
PlayStation Magazine	10/10

Award
Publication	Award
Edge	Gameplay Innovation (runner-up)

Silent Hill received "generally favorable reviews" on the review aggregate website Metacritic. The game sold over two million copies, which earned Silent Hill a spot in the American PlayStation Greatest Hits budget releases. In November 1999, the Verband der Unterhaltungssoftware Deutschland (VUD) awarded Silent Hill a "Gold" certification, indicating sales of at least 100,000 units across Germany, Austria, and Switzerland.

Silent Hill has often been compared to the Resident Evil series of survival horror video games. Bobba Fatt of GamePro labeled Silent Hill a "shameless but slick Resident Evil clone", while Edge described it as "a near-perfect sim nightmare." Others viewed Silent Hill as Konami's answer to the Resident Evil series. While they noted the similarities, Silent Hill utilized a different form of horror, focusing on creating a disturbing atmosphere to evoke fear, in contrast to the visceral scares and action-oriented approach of Resident Evil. Contributing to this atmosphere was the game's audio, which received praise. Billy Matjiunis of TVG described the ambient music as "engrossing", while a reviewer for Game Revolution remarked that the sound and music effectively set players on edge. AllGame editor Michael L. House praised Silent Hill, describing it as "a truly magnificent work of art" and "a genuinely terrifying experience combined with a unique, gripping story and immersive atmosphere." However, the voice acting was less well received. While some reviewers found it superior to that of the Resident Evil series, it was generally considered poor, with pauses between lines that disrupted the atmosphere.

Reviewers noted that Silent Hill used real-time 3D environments, unlike the pre-rendered backgrounds found in Resident Evil. Fog and darkness were heavily used to mask the hardware's limitations. Despite this, most reviewers felt these factors enhanced the game's atmosphere. Francesca Reyes of IGN noted that these elements "added to the atmosphere of dilapidation and decay." However, the use of 3D environments introduced control issues, and maneuverability in tougher areas became "an exercise in frustration."

Edge selected Silent Hill as runner-up for the Gameplay Innovation award, noting that while other games attempted to hide the PlayStation's visual limitations, Konami used the draw-distance deficiency to chilling effect by enveloping the environment in atmospheric fog.

The game's lasting popularity as the first in the series was recognized long after its release. A 2000 list of the best PlayStation games by IGN ranked it as the 14th-best, while GameSpy's 2005 article on the best PlayStation games placed Silent Hill as the 15th-best game produced for the console. In a 2006 GameTrailers video feature, Silent Hill was ranked number one on its list of the top ten scariest games of all time. In 2005, the game was credited for moving the survival horror genre away from B movie horror elements and toward the psychological style seen in art house and Japanese horror films, due to its focus on a disturbing atmosphere rather than visceral horror. In November 2012, Time named it one of the 100 greatest video games of all time.

In June 2026, a fan decompilation of Silent Hill surfaced on GitHub along with a native PC port supporting unlimited frame rates and resolutions.

In 2026 the game was inducted in the World Video Game Hall of Fame.
