= Vampire (2011 film) =

- Film poster
- Directed by: Shunji Iwai
- Written by: Shunji Iwai
- Produced by: Shunji Iwai; Tim Kwok
- Starring: Kevin Zegers; Keisha Castle-Hughes; Amanda Plummer; Trevor Morgan; Adelaide Clemens; Yū Aoi; Rachael Leigh Cook
- Cinematography: Shunji Iwai
- Edited by: Shunji Iwai
- Music by: Shunji Iwai
- Production companies: Convergence Entertainment, Rockwell Eyes, V Project Canada Productions
- Release date: January 22, 2011 (Sundance)
- Running time: 118 minutes
- Countries: United States; Japan
- Language: English

Vampire (Japanese: ヴァンパイア) is a 2011 Japanese drama film written, directed and produced by Shunji Iwai, who also serves as the film's editor, composer and cinematographer. The film stars Kevin Zegers as a teacher who believes himself to be a blood-drinking vampire. It was first released at the Sundance Film Festival on January 22, 2011, and is the first film Iwai has directed in English.

== Synopsis ==
Simon is a seemingly ordinary biology teacher that spends much of his spare time caring for his Alzheimers-ridden mother Helga. This ends up not being the case, as Simon believes himself to be a vampire and spends much of his time looking at online sites for suicidal women who would make for easy prey. One such woman, Jellyfish, is tricked into believing that she and Simon will both be killing one another, only for Simon to drink her blood after he administers sleeping pills and draws blood from her. Along with his vampiric hobby, Simon tries to keep his mother indoors by putting her in a straitjacket-esque contraption tied to several large balloons. It is when Simon meets Laura that things begin to unravel, as she grows obsessed with him to the point where she breaks into his home. Things begin to further devolve when Renfield, a man who also believes himself to be a vampire, emerges onto the scene and is far more violent than Simon ever dared to be.

== Cast ==
- Kevin Zegers as Simon
- Keisha Castle-Hughes as Jellyfish
- Amanda Plummer as Helga
- Trevor Morgan as Renfield
- Adelaide Clemens as Ladybird
- Yū Aoi as Mina
- Kristin Kreuk as Maria Lucas
- Rachael Leigh Cook as Laura King
- Jodi Balfour as Michaela
- Katharine Isabelle as Lapis Lazuli
- Mandy Playdon as Stella Snyder

== Production ==
Iwai was inspired to create Vampire after he "got the idea about a serial killer who was more like a friend to his victims" and liked the question of "if the victims are working with the killer in helping kill themselves, would it be considered murder or aided suicide?". While further developing the idea for Vampire Iwai wanted to "strip away the romantic idea behind vampirism", but also wanted to explore the idea of a vampire that is "not a supernatural creature but rather a real human being". He based the character of Simon partially on "the strange habits that we all have" and stated that if he had not come up with the idea of Simon, he would have likely passed on Vampire's theme. Iwai penned the script for Vampire himself. However, as Iwai had difficulty with spoken English dialogue, asked the performers to "not follow the script too closely and try to be more spontaneous so that the dialogue would be natural."

Actor Kevin Zegers was asked to perform in the film after Iwai met Zegers while dining with friends. Zegers immediately accepted and was one of the first actors brought in. Filming for Vampire took place in Vancouver, British Columbia, Canada during spring of 2010, and Zegers later stated that the process was very taxing due to the film's nature. Iwai confirmed this, saying that the weather was "always gray and rainy, which can bring the mood down" and that he "gave a lot of freedom to Kevin with his character, Simon, so he really took on the sadness and troubles Simon’s character was going through."

== Reception ==
Critical reception for Vampire has been mixed. Much of the film's criticism stemmed from its length, as media outlets such as Screen Daily and the Montreal Gazette felt that it detracted from the film's overall story. Variety praised Iwai’s "fastidiously composed scenes of ritual bloodletting" as one moment where the film "springs to life", but remarked that the film had a limited appeal. The Hollywood Reporter had a similar opinion in their review, with the bottom line reading "Artsy but alienating quasi-horror film offers a non-supernatural alternative to Count Dracula." io9 was more positive in their review, stating "Fans of more traditional vampire fare may not find what they’re looking for in this piece, but anyone who has seen Iwai’s other work, especially his masterpiece of oddball suspense Pikunikku (Picnic), will be right at home with his American debut." Reviewers for Twitch Film gave predominantly positive reviews, echoing io9's sentiments and stating that "for those not turned off by some graphic violence and a whole lot of artistic license, there is a lot to like about this portrait of a killer more empathetic than psychopathic."

=== Awards ===
- Grand Jury Prize for World Cinema - Dramatic at the Sundance Film Festival (2011, nominated)
- Festival Prize at the Strasbourg International Film Festival (2011, won)
- Special Mention for Feature Film at the Fantasia Film Festival (2011, won)
