= Joe Romersa =

American musician

- Genres: Ambient; electronica; rock; trance
- Occupations: Musician; composer; voice actor
- Instruments: Drums; percussion; guitar; vocals
- Years active: 1978–present
- Label: Shadow Box Studio
- Website: joeromersa.com

Joe Romersa is an American musician, composer, voice actor, and music producer.

Romersa started his career as a drummer, but after a tragic early tour at age 19 left him homeless in New Jersey, he began working on music to make money while doing what he enjoyed.

Romersa later studied sound engineering. According to Romersa, combining his fledgling career as a professional musician with the more stable income of sound engineering allowed himself to hone his craft as both a drummer/percussionist and as a sound engineer.

== Career ==
=== Early career ===
Romersa started touring as the drummer for the Marc Tanner Band. On April 19, 1979, they would open for Firefall, at the Palace Theater in Cleveland Ohio. The Marc Tanner Band also opened for Jefferson Starship. Romersa was a drummer, percussionist, and composer on Tanner's second album, Temptation, along with guitarist Ritchie Zito and bassist Ron Edwards.

=== Soy Cowboy ===
While working in the studio, a chance meeting with keyboardist and songwriter Vincent Nicoletti would result in the band Soy Cowboy with its "Thai Western" sound. Romersa was brought in as a drummer and sound engineer, and eventually became lead vocalist. After their first recordings received airplay by Los Angeles radio personality Tom Schnabel of KCRW-FM (89.9), the band caught the attention of then-art student Tarsem Singh. In 1990, Singh would produce Soy Cowboy's only music video for their song "Lily Pads and Rock Cod". Soy Cowboy's first album, First Time Again, was produced in 1991 but it was not released to the public. The album would later be released in 2009, by Shadow Box Studio. Their second album, 2012, was produced and released in 2012. As noted by Schnabel, "The band got moderate airplay on U.S. radio, but in England briefly jumped to the top of the charts."

=== Sound engineering ===
Romersa was both a drummer and engineer on John Prine's 1991 album The Missing Years. He would go on to work with Carlene Carter on her 1993 country music album Little Love Letters as the drummer, percussionist, engineer and backup vocalist, along with bassist Howie Epstein and keyboardist Benmont Tench. Little Love Letters would rise to No. 35 on the Top Country Albums chart and included the No. 3 hit "Every Little Thing" and two top 100 songs; "I Love You 'Cause I Want To" (#50) and "Unbreakable Heart" (#51). Romersa's daughter, Reyna, would make her video debut in "I Love You 'Cause I Want To".

In the late 1980s, Romersa began working with eden ahbez. Romersa and ahbez worked together until the latter's death in 1995.

=== Voice acting ===
In 1994, Romersa started engineering, voice acting and ADR directing on anime and video game projects, which led to his work on Silent Hill. Romersa would go on to work as music supervisor on Silent Hill 3, 4: The Room and Homecoming. He also wrote the lyrics and contributed vocals to "Hometown" and "Cradle of Forest".

=== Return to music ===
One of Romersa's projects as a producer was singer Alana Sweetwater's 2004 self-titled debut album. Her single from that album, "Song of Love", was featured on the original Showtime series The Real L Word. Romersa was also a musician on the album and sound engineer.

Romersa released his first album as a solo artist in 2017, Enough. Written and composed by Romersa, Enough includes tracks by fellow musicians including Laurence Juber ("Love, and You"), Prescott Niles ("Enough", "Humans Doing Angels' Work", "Soldier of Love") and Jeff Jourard ("Give Our Money Back").

Romersa's musical inspirations include The Beatles, Ludwig van Beethoven, John Cage, Jimi Hendrix, Louis Prima, Pink Floyd, Led Zeppelin, Karlheinz Stockhausen, Emerson, Lake & Palmer, The Move and David Bowie.

== Discography ==
=== Mainstream albums ===
Year	Title	Artist	Record Company	Role
Unknown	1000 Pt. Man	Thom Bishop	Virgin Records	Engineer
1978	Living in the USA	Linda Ronstadt	Elektra Entertainment	Engineer
1978	Thank You for Funkin' Up My Life	Donald Byrd	Elektra/Asylum	Engineer
1979	Fate for Breakfast	Art Garfunkel	Legacy Records	Engineer
1980	Temptation	The Marc Tanner Band	Elektra/Asylum	Musician, writer
1987	In Full Swing	Full Swing	Cypress Records	Engineer
1987	The Bitch Is Back	Bitch	Enigma/Metal Blade	Producer
1989	Second Coming	The Dickies	Restless Records	Engineer
1990	China Beach: Music and Memories	Various Artists	Warner Bros. Records	Engineer
1990	The Sounds of Murphy Brown: Original Television Soundtrack Album	Various Artists	MCA Records	Engineer
1990	Thirteen Blood Red Rosebuds	Steve Forbert	SquirrelMad	Sound Engineer, Drums
1991	The Missing Years	John Prine	Oh Boy Records	Engineer, musician
1991	The Ruby Sea	Thin White Rope	Frontier	Musician
1993	Little Love Letters	Carlene Carter	Warner Bros. Records	Engineer, musician
1995	Lost Dogs and Mixed Blessings	John Prine	Oh Boy Records	Engineer, musician, Co-Writer (One Song)
1995	Beauty and the Beast	Sven Väth	Warner Bros. Records	Engineer
2003	Silent Hill 3 Original Soundtracks	Akira Yamaoka	Konami	Featured Singer, Music supervisor
2003	Songs of Bob Dylan: May Your Song Always Be Sung	Various Artists	BMG	Engineer, musician, featured singer
2004	Coercion Street	Ernie Payne	Black & Tan Holland	Musician
2004	Silent Hill 4: The Room – Original Soundtracks	Akira Yamaoka	Konami	Featured Singer, Music supervisor, Lyrics writer
2008	Silent Hill Zero Original Soundtrack	Akira Yamaoka	Konami	Lyrics writer
2008	Silent Hill: Homecoming Soundtrack	Akira Yamaoka	Konami	Lyrics writer
2009	Silent Hill: Shattered Memories Soundtrack	Akira Yamaoka	Konami	Lyrics writer

=== Indie albums ===
Title	Artist	Record Company	Role
Alana Sweetwater	Alana Sweetwater	Shadow Box Studio	Producer, musician, writer
Free Enterprise	Free Enterprise	Indie	Engineer, producer
Julia Free	Julia Free	Indie	Producer, musician, writer
Larry Whitman	Larry Whitman	Indie	Producer
Meat Sandwich	Meat Sandwich	Shadow Box Studio	Engineer, producer, artist
Nuclear Test Band	Nuclear Test Band	Indie	Musician, engineer
Needles and Pins	Page Pazaro	Indie	Engineer, producer
O The Band	O The Band	Indie	Producer, musician, writer
First Time Again	Soy Cowboy	Shadow Box Studio	Producer, musician, writer
2012	Soy Cowboy	Shadow Box Studio	Producer, musician, writer
Yolie Lox and the Bears	Yolie Lox and the Bears	Indie	Engineer, producer, artist
Audio Monkey	Joe Romersa	Shadow Box Studio	Artist, engineer, producer
Enough	Joe Romersa	Shadow Box Studio	Artist, musician, producer
Who We Are Today	Joe Romersa	Lucky 88 Music LLC	Artist, Writer, Musician

== Acting ==
=== Anime voice-over ===
- Akira as Joker
- Armitage III as Big Thug
- Bastard!! as Priest C
- Battle Athletes as Claus (Ep. 4); Hans (Ep. 4)
- Battle Athletes Victory as Additional Voices
- Black Jack as Mob Boss
- Black Magic M-66 as Additional Voices
- Blood: The Last Vampire as David
- Code Geass: Lelouch of the Rebellion as Ryouga Senba
- Cowboy Bebop as Abdul Hakim
- Dual! Parallel Trouble Adventure
- El Hazard: The Magnificent World as Driver (Ep. 3)
- El Hazard 2 – The Magnificent World as Additional Voices
- El Hazard: The Alternative World as Additional Voices
- El Hazard: The Wanderers as Additional Voices
- Gate Keepers as Hippie
- Ghost in the Shell as Truck Driver (as Joe Michaels)
- Ghost in the Shell 2: Innocence as Crab Man, Undersea Cyborg Escort (Animaze Dub)
- Ghost in the Shell: Stand Alone Complex: 2nd Gig as Coil Krasnov, Kitora Masoki
- Ghost in the Shell: Stand Alone Complex: Solid State Society as Colonel Ka Gael, Security Cyborg
- Hand Maid May as Additional Voices
- Hyper Doll as Additional Voices
- Lupin III: The Castle of Cagliostro as Gustav (Animaze Dub)
- Macross Plus as Additional Voices
- Mobile Suit Gundam: The Movie Trilogy as Gaia
- Mobile Suit Gundam: The 08th MS Team as Hige, Doctor
- Mobile Suit Gundam: The 08th MS Team – Miller's Report as Agent Jacob
- Moldiver as Additional Voices
- Ninja Scroll as Additional Voices
- Ninku the Movie as Additional Voices
- Orguss 02 as Additional Voices
- Outlaw Star as Fake Shimi; Kyokan
- Phantom Quest Corp as Additional Voices
- Red Hawk – Weapon of Death as Additional Voices
- Rurouni Kenshin as Merchant (Ep. 15); Politician (Ep. 15); Raiko
- Sol Bianca: The Legacy as Additional Voices
- Street Fighter II: The Animated Movie as Balrog (as Joe Michaels)
- Street Fighter II V as Balrog (Animaze Dub)
- Street Fighter Alpha as Zangief
- The Big O as Nightingale Club Bouncer (Ep. 2), Repairman (Ep. 25)
- The Legend of Black Heaven as Luke Yamada
- The Wings of Honneamise as Air Force Member 4
- They Were 11 as Knu
- Trigun as Descartes

=== Video game roles ===
- Brave Fencer Musashi as Ben
- NeverDead as Astaroth
- Seven Samurai 20XX - Zex

=== Non-anime voice-over ===
- Big Rig Buddies as Smokey the Fire Truck (formerly)

=== Staff work ===
- Armitage III as ADR Engineer
- Brave Fencer Musashi as Voice Director
- Bushido Blade 2 as Digital Tracker (English voices)
- The Castle of Cagliostro as Digital Tracker, English Adapter, Director (Manga Entertainment dub)
- Dual! Paralle lunlun monogatari as Final Mixer, director
- Ghost in the Shell as Digital Tracker (English voices)
- Firefighter F.D.18 as English Dialogue Director
- Front Mission 4 as Voice Director
- Invisible Mom II as Music Supervisor
- Lurking Fear as Dialogue Editor
- Nano Breaker as ADR Director
- The New Adventures of Captain Planet as Sound Designer
- Reaper Tales as Sound Recordist
- Resident Evil 5 as Sound Designer, Video Storyboard Artist
- Shadow Warriors as Dialogue Editor
- Silent Hill: Homecoming as Lyricist
- Street Fighter Alpha as Writer, director
- Suikoden IV as ADR Director
- Timberwood Tales as Editor
- Tollbooth as Dialogue Editor, ADR recordist
- Wings of Honnêamise as Dialogue Sound Engineer
- Got Milk? as Music Score
