= Silent Hill 3 =

2003 video game

- European cover art, featuring the character Heather Mason
- Developer: Team Silent (Note: Team Silent was a group in Konami Computer Entertainment Tokyo.)
- Publisher: Konami
- Director: Kazuhide Nakazawa
- Producer: Akira Yamaoka
- Programmer: Yukinori Ojima
- Artist: Masahiro Ito
- Writer: Hiroyuki Owaku
- Composer: Akira Yamaoka
- Series: Silent Hill
- Platforms: PlayStation 2; Microsoft Windows
- Release: PlayStation 2: EU: May 23, 2003; JP: July 3, 2003; NA: August 5, 2003; Microsoft Windows: EU: October 31, 2003; NA: November 21, 2003
- Genre: Survival horror
- Mode: Single-player

Silent Hill 3 (Note: Japanese: サイレントヒル 3, Hepburn: Sairento Hiru Surī) is a 2003 survival horror video game developed by Konami's Team Silent and published by Konami for the PlayStation 2. The third installment in the Silent Hill series and a direct sequel to the first Silent Hill game follows Heather Mason, a teenager who becomes entangled in the machinations of the town's cult, which seeks to revive a malevolent deity. A port for Microsoft Windows was released later in November, and a remastered high-definition version was released as part of the Silent Hill HD Collection, for the PlayStation 3 and Xbox 360 in 2012.

Originally planned to be a rail shooter spin-off, as a result of the initially slow sales of Silent Hill 2. Silent Hill 3 was developed simultaneously alongside another installment in the series, Silent Hill 4: The Room. Among the influences on Silent Hill 3 are the film Jacob's Ladder (1990) and the works of horror novelist Stephen King. Silent Hill 3 sold over 300,000 copies by September 30, 2003 and was well-received by critics, garnering praise for its presentation, including the environments, graphics and audio, as well as the overall horror elements and themes that are continued from past installments; although there was minor criticism of the game's short length, camera, and gameplay mechanics. Its plot was loosely adapted into the 2012 film Silent Hill: Revelation.

== Gameplay ==
Heather in the shopping mall, next to a dead Closer

Silent Hill 3 is a survival horror video game in which the player takes control of Heather, a 17-year-old girl who awakens from a nightmare in a shopping mall restaurant and navigates environments that switch between reality and the Otherworld, a bloodier, supernatural alternate world. Gameplay in Silent Hill 3 resembles closely that of its two predecessors, set in the third-person view and divided among elements of combat, exploration, and puzzle-solving. The difficulty of both the combat and puzzle elements of the game can be selected separately. For puzzle difficulty settings, there is a considerable difference between the "medium" difficulty level and the "hard" difficulty level; one of the puzzles on the "medium" level requires only simple pattern recognition, while the "hard" difficulty level version of the same puzzle requires knowledge of Shakespeare's plays to solve.

To aid in exploration, Heather obtains a flashlight and radio early on, the latter of which crackles when monsters are in proximity. She can find "health" restoratives, such as first aid kits and energy drinks; beef jerky, used to lure monsters away from her path; and a range of firearms and melee weapons to fend off monsters. She can also block and perform side-step maneuvers to avoid enemies. Heather will also update any relevant maps of the area with notes for locked doors, inaccessible areas, and potential clues to puzzles. While the floor plans of the various environments largely remains consistent between reality and the Otherworld, certain areas may be rendered inaccessible in the Otherworld, with barriers or bottomless gulfs appearing in the street, for example. The game also features unlockable weapons and costumes.

== Plot ==
17 years after the events of the first game, Heather (Heather Morris) experiences a nightmare of being trapped in a derelict amusement park and killed by the roller coaster. She awakens in a burger restaurant within a shopping mall, but before she can leave the mall and return home to her father Harry Mason, private detective Douglas Cartland (Richard Grosse) confronts her, claiming to have information about her birth. Heather evades him and discovers that the mall is mostly abandoned except for monsters. She encounters Claudia (Donna Burke), a mysterious woman who hints that Heather will be instrumental in bringing about paradise on earth.

Heather soon finds herself in the Otherworld version of the mall—a monster-filled, bloodstained, and decaying alternate world—and eventually returns to the original shopping mall, where she finds Douglas again. He confesses that Claudia had hired him to find her, though he denies prior knowledge of the Otherworld or of any greater agenda of Claudia's. Heather leaves the mall and resolves to go home via the subway. When she returns home to her apartment, she discovers that her father was murdered on Claudia's orders. Claudia informs her that Harry's murder was out of revenge and to engender hatred in Heather. Before leaving, Claudia tells her that she will be waiting for her in the town of Silent Hill.

Intent on killing Claudia, Heather resolves to go to Silent Hill and accepts Douglas' offer to drive her there. On the journey there, Heather learns from Harry's journal that she was the baby left to him at the end of the first Silent Hill game. Because she is the reincarnation of Alessa, the girl originally intended to give birth to the cult's god, Claudia intends for her to bring forth the god. Arriving in the seemingly abandoned and fog-shrouded town, Heather sets out to find a man named Leonard in a local hospital, being told by a member of the cult named Vincent that Leonard was in possession of a powerful magical sigil, the Seal of Metatron.

Revealed to be Claudia's abusive father, Leonard intends to dispose of Claudia as cult leader and attacks Heather after learning that she is not a member of the cult. Heather defeats him, taking the Seal of Metatron. She journeys to the local church of the cult through a local amusement park at Vincent's request, who—despite being a member of the cult—opposes Claudia's goals. When Heather arrives at the amusement park, she finds Douglas wounded, having tried to stop Claudia. He considers killing Heather to stop the god from being born but decides against it.

Heather reaches the church and learns that Claudia, who was Alessa's childhood friend, intends to bring about the god's birth to remake the world into a paradise. Heather confronts her and uses a supernatural substance, given to her by Harry before his death, to vomit out the fetal deity, which was nourished by her hatred. Claudia promptly swallows the fetus to Heather's horror in an attempt to complete the birthing process of the god. Claudia is snatched away by an archangel of the cult to the chapel below, where she is found to have given birth and disappeared (with Heather presuming her dead). Heather defeats the newly born god and takes time to mourn her father.

Three endings appear in the game. The "Normal" ending, which is the only ending available on the first play-through of the game, sees Heather and Douglas survive, (Note: Heather also reverts back to her birth name Cheryl.) while in the "Possessed" ending, Heather kills Douglas. In the "Revenge" ending, which is a joke ending accessible by performing certain in-game actions, Heather reunites with Harry, and Harry orders UFOs to blow up Silent Hill.

== Development ==
Silent Hill 3 was created by Team Silent, a production group within Konami Computer Entertainment Tokyo. Development on the PlayStation 2 version began after the release of Silent Hill 2 in September 2001, and was carried out simultaneously with the development of Silent Hill 4: The Room. The development team for this iteration was smaller than that working on Silent Hill 2, with around 40 people working on the game, made up of the core team from the second title and some newcomers. A smaller group of staff led by Akihiro Imamura of Team Silent, later developed a port for Windows.

Early sketch of antagonist Claudia Wolf (left) compared to her final iteration

Silent Hill 3 was originally planned to be a rail shooter spin-off, not a direct sequel to the first Silent Hill game, as a result of the initially slow sales of Silent Hill 2. This decision wasted considerable development time and part of the game's budget. Eventually, the plan was discarded, with most of the early work being almost completely scrapped; although the concept of a Silent Hill rail shooter was later explored with Silent Hill: The Arcade in 2007. According to Masahiro Ito, Silent Hill 3's final version was developed from scratch in 10 months. According to Ito, Hiroyuki Owaku wrote the game's scenario in 1 month. According to Ito, Valtiel was not supposed to be in the game originally, when Owaku brought the scenario to him, he felt that it wasn't enough, so he added him in the game. According to Ito, there was not enough time to write a scenario for a sequel. According to Ito, after development on Silent Hill 2 wrapped up, Takayoshi Sato was supposed to work on Silent Hill 3 as a character designer and CGI creator, but since the development period was 10 months, it was impossible schedule-wise. Sato drafted a script for Silent Hill 3 which went unused, before he left Konami in February 2003 following a disagreement concerning his pay on Silent Hill 2. He told in a 2009 interview, "What I was thinking was similar genre, different game. I think I better keep it secret. Who knows there may be a chance to realize the idea some day?"

Like all Silent Hill games, one of Silent Hill 3's influences is the film Jacob's Ladder: one of the subway platforms is named Bergen Street Station, the station Jacob was inquiring about at the beginning of the film. The developers also cited horror writer Stephen King as another of their influences. Silent Hill 3 incorporates references drawn from real-life actors and actresses. Douglas Cartland's name came from American actor Douglas Fairbanks. The developers stated that his name "just seemed to suit him" and that there was no true connection to his namesake. During the sketching process, his character was modeled after actors Giancarlo Giannini and Ian Holm. It was noted even during the concept designs that Cartland was designed as a middle-aged detective. Richard Grosse, the actor that played Douglas, died on April 12, 2003, a month before the game's release. Claudia Wolf's character was considered the most difficult to design. Early sketches revealed that the creators wanted to dress her like a holy woman, and at one point she had a shaved head, with her body covered with tattoos, however, the creators thought that this way of showing her malevolent side was too obvious. Eventually, the creators decided to model her on Julianne Moore, and then remove her eyebrows, so that the appearance was slightly skewed. She was first named "Christie", but it was deemed too "cute" and the character was eventually named after Italian actress Claudia Cardinale. Vincent's name originated from actor Vincent Gallo in connection with his unshaven look. Early designs were based on actor Ethan Hawke and focused on capturing a look of "derangement and moodiness."

=== Music ===
Silent Hill 3

Soundtrack album by Akira Yamaoka
- Released: July 16, 2003
- Genres: Dark ambient; industrial; trip hop; alternative rock; video game soundtrack
- Length: 76:18
- Label: Konami Music

The soundtrack for Silent Hill 3 was composed by Akira Yamaoka. It was included with the game in North America and was released in Europe on March 25, 2003, and in Japan on July 16, 2003. The song "You're Not Here" was included in the PS2 port of Dance Dance Revolution Extreme, and is also included in the Silent Hill Experience UMD media pack. The game's soundtrack is the first using vocals prominently. Most of the vocalized tracks are performed by Mary Elizabeth McGlynn (credited as Melissa Williamson); with Joe Romersa providing the chant on the track "Prayer" as well as the vocals on the ending theme, "Hometown".

== Release ==
Silent Hill 3 was first released for the PlayStation 2 in Europe on May 23, 2003, in Japan on July 3, and in North America on August 5. It was released for Windows in Europe on October 31, 2003 and in North America on November 21.

=== Other versions ===
A remastered high-definition version was released along with Silent Hill 2 as part of the Silent Hill HD Collection, for the PlayStation 3 and the Xbox 360 on March 20, 2012. New voice actors were brought in to re-record the dialogue from both games. While the second game provided an option for the original voice acting, the third game, however, did not have that option, with "technical and logistical" difficulties cited.

In 2019, Konami Japan released a Pachislot for casinos, Silent Hill: Return, based on the third game. Heather's fate in battle is decided according to the result obtained in a roulette. It also features bonus modes where players must defend themselves from enemies.

== Reception ==
Reception

Aggregate score
| Aggregator | Score |
|---|---|
| Metacritic | 85/100 (PS2); 72/100 (PC) |

Review scores
| Publication | Score |
|---|---|
| AllGame | 2.5/5 (PS2) |
| Game Informer | 8.25/10 (PS2) |
| GameSpot | 8.4/10 (PS2); 7.6/10 (PC) |
| GameSpy | 8.7/10 (PS2); 6.8/10 (PC) |
| GameZone | 8.5/10 (PS2); 8.0/10 (PC) |
| IGN | 8.8/10 (PS2); 9.0/10 (PC) |

Silent Hill 3 received positive reviews, garnering an 85/100 rating at Metacritic for the PlayStation 2 version, and a 72/100 rating for the PC version. The PC version fared less well, with some reviewers drawing unfavourable comparisons to other combat-based games found on the PC platform, while others highlighted some technical issues, such as poor gamepad controller support.

Positive reactions were given to the general horror and atmosphere of the game, including "truly horrifying sections", it "packs some genuine scares" and "the feeling of eeriness and doom is almost overwhelming". The story told as part of the atmosphere was also received positively, making for a "satisfying, coherent sequel", although its status as such meant that "it may be a little tough to follow for people who haven't played the first game", despite "a laudable effort to help people catch up". In addition, the graphics, audio and production values were all credited with adding positively to the atmosphere.

Negative criticism largely stemmed from the lack of any innovations in gameplay; the game "doesn't do anything major that the series hasn't done before", "does little in term of innovation" and "doesn't offer much beyond the other titles in the series". Also criticised was the game's camera and control system which, despite having been improved from previous games, was described as "awkward, disorienting, and motion sickness-inducing". Some criticism stemmed from the length of the game, as it "can be easily beaten in a handful of hours". AllGame found the story less compelling compared to the first two entries.

Silent Hill 3 sold over 300,000 copies by September 30, 2003. The game also topped sales charts in Japan upon its release, with 58,000 copies sold in the first three days.

== Film adaptation ==
A film adaptation of Silent Hill 3, titled Silent Hill: Revelation 3D, was released on October 26, 2012, by Open Road Films. The film is a sequel to the film adaptation of the first installment in the Silent Hill series. Directed by M. J. Bassett, it starred Adelaide Clemens as Heather, Kit Harington as Vincent Cooper, Sean Bean as Harry Mason, Carrie-Anne Moss as Claudia Wolf, and Malcolm McDowell as Leonard Wolf.
