= List of Silent Hill characters =

The 1999 survival horror video game Silent Hill features a large cast of characters.

== Design ==
Silent Hill characters were designed by Takayoshi Sato. Team Silent, a production group within Konami Computer Entertainment Tokyo, oversaw the process.

== Characters ==
=== Harry Mason ===
Harry Mason (ハリー・メイソン, Harī Meison) is the player character. A widower, writer and father of his adopted daughter Cheryl. They crash while driving past Silent Hill. He escapes the town by himself or with police officer Cybil.

Harry makes a cameo in Silent Hill 3, which stars Heather, Harry's adopted daughter and Alessa's reincarnation. He is murdered by the Missionary under Claudia's orders.

Harry is the protagonist of the Silent Hill: Shattered Memories reimagining, which starts similarly to the original game. However, it is revealed that Harry had died long before, and his "travel" through Silent Hill is actually inside his daughter Cheryl's head, who broke down after Harry died in a car crash.

In the games, Harry is voiced by Michael Guinn (credited as Michael G) in the original game and by Kirk Thornton in Shattered Memories.

In the films, Harry's role is divided among Rose and Christopher Da Silva. In the Silent Hill film, Harry's role is played by Rose. In Silent Hill: Revelation the plot is retconned, although Rose is still in Silent Hill. Christopher then takes the role of Harry, adopting the alias Harry Mason. Christopher enters Silent Hill to search for Rose. He is portrayed by Sean Bean.

=== Cheryl Mason ===
Cheryl Mason (シェリル・メイソン, Sheriru Meison) is the adopted daughter of Harry Mason. She is the untainted half of Alessa Gillespie's soul, which split during Alessa's ritualistic immolation by the Order, which she barely survived. The soul was reincarnated into baby Cheryl. Seven years afterward, Cheryl and Harry crash their car to avoid hitting Alessa's other half, who appears in the road. Cheryl disappears after the crash and is later seen running down an alley, but is never seen again. She is later fused with Alessa, becoming an angelic being called the Incubator. If Harry faces the Incubator's evil side, the Incubus, Cheryl's spirit thanks Harry for his hospitality before reincarnating along with Alessa as a baby girl, whom Harry adopts and names Cheryl (although she would go by Heather).

In Silent Hill: Shattered Memories, Cheryl, Heather, and Alessa are all reimagined as "Cheryl Heather Mason", the biological daughter of Harry and Dahlia Mason. She refuses to accept her father's death, imagining him stranded in Silent Hill. She hates her mother, blaming her for divorcing Harry, though they reconcile at the end. In the Silent Hill film, Cheryl, renamed Sharon da Silva, is adopted by the da Silvas. She is abducted by the Order, but is rescued by her mother and her own dark self, the latter massacring the entire Order. Sharon then merges with her original and dark selves. The sequel, Silent Hill: Revelation retcons this as Sharon, now known as Heather, searches for her father.

=== Jodie Mason ===
Jodie Mason (ジョディ・メイソン, Jodi Meison) is the deceased wife of Harry and the adopting mother of Cheryl. She was Harry's high school sweetheart, and their marriage is described as a "nine-year honeymoon". Jodie contracts an illness that leaves her unable to have children, and dies when Cheryl is three years old. Jodie's persona is combined with that of Dahlia to become Dahlia Mason, the ex-wife of Harry and mother of Cheryl in Silent Hill: Shattered Memories.

=== Dahlia Gillespie ===
Dahlia Gillespie (ダリア・ギレスピー, Daria Giresupī) is the leader of the Order. She is the main antagonist of Silent Hill and Silent Hill: Origins. Dahlia is the mother of Alessa, whom she abused. She wants to trigger the birth of the Order's God, using her daughter, Alessa as the 'mother of God'. She explained the Order and its beliefs to the children of the orphanage. In Silent Hill: Origins, as part of the birthing ritual, Dahlia burns Alessa, but the ritual fails. Alessa's soul is split, with part of it becoming Cheryl. In Silent Hill, Dahlia first appears as a bystander, but later reveals that she has ordered Cheryl's abduction. She fuses Cheryl with Alessa, effectively resuming the ritual to birth the God. The Incubator, a form of the God in Alessa's body, is hit by Kaufmann's aglaophotis, causing a demonic form of the Order's god to emerge, the Incubus, who kills Dahlia. In Silent Hill 4: The Room, it is revealed that Dahlia took part in brainwashing Walter Sullivan, leading him to believe that the 21 Sacraments are the only way to see his "mother".

Dahlia and Jodie merge to become Dahlia Mason in Silent Hill: Shattered Memories. She divorced Harry years earlier, earning her daughter's hatred. Depending on the ending, Dahlia can reconcile with Cheryl after the latter accepts Harry's demise. Dahlia appears in the Silent Hill film, where she is a much more sympathetic character who is tricked to hand Alessa over to her sister, Christabella. Dahlia survives Alessa's killing of the Order, as a loving mother. In Silent Hill: Revelation, Dahlia appears in a minor role giving cryptic warnings to Heather.

Dahlia is voiced by Liz Mamorsky in the original game, Laurence Bouvard in Origins, and by Laura Bailey in Shattered Memories. In the film, she is portrayed by Deborah Kara Unger.

=== Alessa Gillespie ===
Alessa Gillespie (アレッサ・ギレスピー, Aressa Giresupī) is the central character of Silent Hill, Silent Hill 3 (in the form of Heather), and Silent Hill: Origins, the series' most important character as a central element of all that happens in the series. Dahlia's daughter, she was born with powers, which allowed Dahlia to use her to birth the God of the Order. In her childhood, she was best friends with Claudia, the only person who ever understood her. Alessa was used as a ritual sacrifice by Dahlia in an attempt to birth the Order's God but spiritually resisted the ritual and was rescued by Travis. Alessa's soul split during the failed ritual, one half of which went into Cheryl. Alessa is kept alive in a broken state, suffering with incurable wounds and projecting her nightmares onto the town. In Silent Hill, a projection of Alessa makes Harry crash his car, allowing Cheryl to recombine with her. After the death of the Incubator, all that is left of Alessa is the baby Heather, who was recovered from the Incubator's corpse. Alessa also appears in Silent Hill 4: The Room on a medallion titled as Saint Alessa.

In the Silent Hill film, Alessa is then split into three: her pure self, who is reincarnated into a baby that the da Silvas adopted as Sharon; her dark self, who is an incarnation of the Order's God merged with Alessa's anger; and her original body. Alessa's dark self merges into Rose so she can then exterminate Christabella's cult. Afterwards, the three selves recombine in Sharon's body. The sequel retcons this as Alessa's dark self roams free, who manages to later merge with Heather.

Alessa is voiced by Sandra Wane in the original game and Jennifer Woodward in Origins. In the film, she is portrayed by Jodelle Ferland.

=== Cybil Bennett ===
Cybil Bennett (シビル・ベネット, Shibiru Benetto) is a cop from the neighboring town of Brahms, whom Harry meets before crashing in Silent Hill. She is possessed by a parasite, which affects game endings; if Cybil is rescued, she escapes alongside Harry. Her fate is uncertain; her only other mention in the canonical games is in Silent Hill: Homecoming, when Wheeler mentions her. In Silent Hill: Shattered Memories, Cybil is reimagined, reappearing as the cop whom Harry encounters. In the Silent Hill film, Cybil helps Rose search for Sharon, but gets captured by the Order, who burns her alive.

Cybil is voiced by Susan Papa in the original game and by Kirsten Potter in Shattered Memories. In the film, she is portrayed by Laurie Holden.

=== Dr. Michael Kaufmann ===
Michael Kaufmann (カウフマン, Kaufuman) is the director of Alchemilla Hospital. He is part of the Order and aids Dahlia's plans to birth the God. After Alessa's immolation, Kaufmann commits Alessa to the hospital and forces his girlfriend Lisa to keep Alessa alive. In Silent Hill, Kaufmann defies Dahlia by throwing Aglaophotis at the Incubator, expelling the Incubus. Kaufmann attempts to follow Harry through the portal to escape the area collapsing around him, but he is stopped by Lisa's spirit. Kaufmann reappears in Silent Hill: Shattered Memories as a psychiatrist who periodically performs psychological questionnaires and tests on the player.

Michael is voiced by Jarion Monroe in the original game, John Chancer in Origins, and by Michael McConnohie in Shattered Memories.

=== Lisa Garland ===
Lisa Garland (リサ, Risa) is a nurse working at Alchemilla Hospital. In Silent Hill: Origins, Lisa is addicted to a drug called PTV. She accepts drugs in exchange for caring for Alessa. Lisa is fazed by Alessa's persistent wounds and she becomes involved with the Order. Lisa dies between Silent Hill: Origins and Silent Hill, but returns in Silent Hill. Lisa helps Harry around Silent Hill and tells him about the Order. She realizes that she is actually deceased and disappears. In the ending Lisa's spirit stops Kaufmann and drags him to his death. Lisa has a brief appearance in Silent Hill: Shattered Memories, where Harry rescues her from a crash only for her to succumb to her injuries: in one ending, it is implied that she is his mistress. Lisa also appears in the Silent Hill film, though she is unnamed and credited as "Red Nurse". She peeks at Alyssa who reacts violently and burns her eyes.

Lisa is voiced by Thessaly Lerner in the original game and Jennifer Woodward in Origins. In the film, she is portrayed by Emily Lineham.

=== The God ===
The God (ゴッド, Goddo) is the Order's deity and the foremost antagonist of the series. It served as the final boss of Origins, 1, and 3, and has cameos in 4, Shattered Memories, and Downpour. According to the Order's mythology, the God was birthed in ancient times by humans who sought an end to the constant suffering around them. The God took away mankind's immortality so they could appreciate death, and created linear time. It vowed to create a Paradise on Earth, but died. It promised to return and complete its plan if its followers remained loyal. The God takes four forms: the default form is a woman in a red dress, while as The Incubus it resembles the occult deity Baphomet. The Incubator is the version as seen by Alessa, The Demonic Nightmare of Alessa in Silent Hill: Origins, and as Claudia Wolf version in Silent Hill 3. Silent Hill: Downpour implies that the God's original name was the Native American deity Kwekwaxawe (Raven) as Silent Hill was originally titled The Nest of the Raven. The Order hopes to use Heather to birth the God, but she resists. Claudia attempts the ritual, but dies in the process. As a result of the botched birth process, the God is born prematurely, and is easily killed by Heather.

The gender of the God is seemingly male in Silent Hill, as Dahlia refers to the God as 'He' several times, but is referred to with feminine pronouns in later appearances in the series. It is also possible that this was part of her plan to trick Harry into believing she was a Christian, rather than the leader of a local non-Christian cult. Although it should also be noted that she continues to refer to a male God as Alessa begins to birth 'God'.

In the Silent Hill film, the only reference to the God comes from Alessa's dark self, who hints that she is an incarnation of the God (saying she "has many names") who is currently bonded with Alessa's anger born from suffering. In the sequel, it is explained that the burning of Alessa was an attempt by the Order to have her give birth to the God, and the Order wants to draw Heather back to Silent Hill so that they can make a second attempt at it.
