= Adelaide Clemens =

Australian actress (born 1989)

- Adelaide Clemens at 83rd Venice International Film Festival
- Born: 30 November 1989 (age 36); Brisbane, Queensland, Australia
- Occupation: Actress
- Years active: 2006–present

Adelaide Clemens (born 30 November 1989) is an Australian actress. On television, she has played Harper on the W series Love My Way (2007), Valentine on the BBC/HBO series Parade's End (2012), Tawney on the Sundance TV series Rectify (2013–2016), and Blake on the CBS series Tommy (2020). In film, she has played Xandrie in Wasted on the Young (2010), Ladybird in Vampire (2011), Heather / Sharon in Silent Hill: Revelation (2012), Catherine in The Great Gatsby (2013), Hazel in To the Stars (2019), and Carey in The Swearing Jar (2022).

== Early life and education ==
Adelaide Clemens was born in Brisbane, Queensland. Her parents lived in Japan but travelled to Australia for her birth. She and her family returned to Japan shortly thereafter. She has two younger brothers, Sebastian and Felix. Her father, Mark Clemens, is English and was a marketing manager for Seagram. Her mother, Janea Clemens, is an Australian cardiac nurse.

After living in Japan, she was raised in France until the age of six, and then Hong Kong to the age of 12, where she attended the Hong Kong International School. When she was 12 years old, her family moved to Australia to live in Sydney, New South Wales. She attended high school at the Queenwood School for Girls, in the Sydney suburb of Balmoral.

== Career ==
Clemens began working as an actress in Australian television while in high school. She guest-starred in a 2006 episode of Blue Water High as Juliet, and, in 2007, starred in the children's series Pirate Islands: The Lost Treasure of Fiji, as Alison. Clemens played Harper in the Showtime drama Love My Way that year, and was nominated for the Graham Kennedy Award for Most Outstanding New Talent at the 2008 Logie Awards for the role.

Clemens was seen in the MTV Networks Australia dramatic film, Dream Life (2008), and had small roles in the television series All Saints and the film X-Men Origins: Wolverine, in 2009. She became the face of Jan Logan Jewellery that year. Clemens relocated to Los Angeles, California, in 2009.

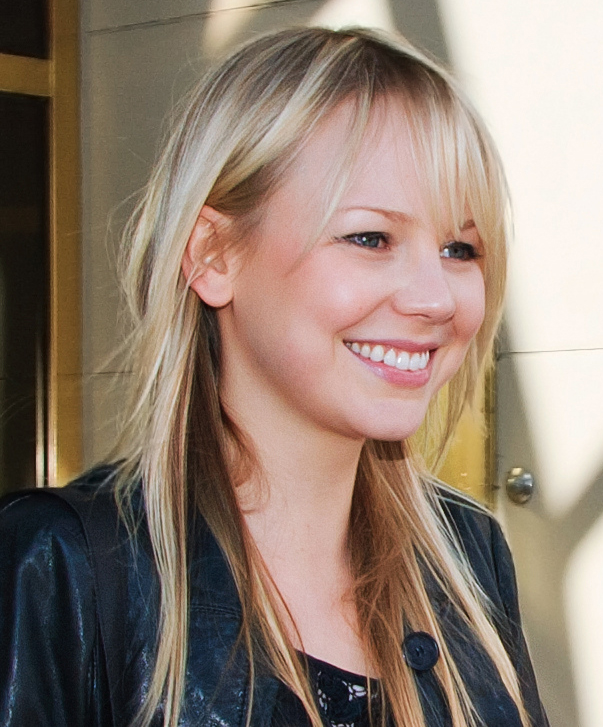
Clemens at the 2010 Toronto International Film Festival

She starred in the film Wasted on the Young (2010) as Xandrie. Written and directed by Ben C. Lucas, the film tells the story of a high school love triangle that leads to a party ending in gun violence. She guest-starred on the Fox crime drama, Lie To Me, and starred as a sociopathic prostitute in the film Generation Um... (2010). in January 2010, she was briefly considered for a part in Mad Max: Fury Road, but did not appear in the film.

The following year, she starred in the film Certainty (2011), directed by Peter Askin. She also starred in Vampire (2011) as Ladybird, a suicidal single mother. The film was the English-language feature debut of noted Japanese director Shunji Iwai.

The next year, Clemens starred in Camilla Dickinson (2012), an adaptation of Madeleine L'Engle's 1951 novel. She starred as teenager Heather Mason in the horror film Silent Hill: Revelation 3D (2012). Also that year, Clemens played a lead role as the young suffragette Valentine Wannop in Parade's End (2012), a television mini-series adaptation of the Ford Madox Ford tetralogy co-produced by HBO and BBC Two. She also appeared in the horror film No One Lives (2012).

The following year, she appeared in The Great Gatsby (2013), based on F. Scott Fitzgerald's novel of the same name, playing Catherine, the sister of Myrtle Wilson. On television, Clemens began starring as Tawney Talbot in the 2013 Sundance Channel series, Rectify.

In 2017, she starred in Rabbit, supernatural horror film, written and directed by Luke Shanahan and produced by David Ngo.

In 2020, Clemens took a starring role in the CBS drama Tommy.

== Filmography ==
=== Film ===
Year	Title	Role	Notes
2009	X-Men Origins: Wolverine	Carnival girl	Cameo appearance
2010	At the Tattooist	Kelly	Short film
2010	Wasted on the Young	Xandrie	
2011	Vampire	Ladybird	
2011	Certainty	Deb Catalano	
2012	Camilla Dickinson	Camilla Dickinson	
2012	Generation Um...	Mia	
2012	No One Lives	Emma	
2012	Silent Hill: Revelation	Heather Mason / Sharon Da Silva	
2013	The Great Gatsby	Catherine	
2015	The World Made Straight	Lori	
2015	The Automatic Hate	Alexis Green	
2017	Rabbit	Maude Ashton	
2018	The Caretaker	Sara	Short film
2019	To the Stars	Hazel Atkins	
2019	I'll Find You	Rachel Rubin	
2022	The Swearing Jar	Carey	
2024	White Widow	Natalie	
2024	Kangaroo Island	Freya Wells	
2026	Company		Completed

=== Television ===
Year	Title	Role	Notes
2006	Blue Water High	Juliet	Episode: "2.5"
2007	Pirate Islands: The Lost Treasure of Fiji	Alison	Main role
2007	Love My Way	Harper	Recurring role; 8 episodes
2008	Out of the Blue	Fiona	Episode: "1.37"
2008	Dream Life	Rose	Television film
2009	All Saints	Stephanie	Episode: "Give and Take 2"
2010	The Pacific	Registrar Girl	Episode: "Home"
2010	Lie to Me	Megan Cross	Episode: "The Royal We"
2012	Parade's End	Valentine Wannop	Miniseries; main role
2013–2016	Rectify	Tawney Talbot	Main role
2014	Parer's War	Elizabeth Marie Cotter	Television film
2018	Voltron: Legendary Defender	Merla (voice)	Main role (season 8)
2020	Tommy	Blake	Main role
2022	Under the Banner of Heaven	Rebecca Pyre	Miniseries; main role
2023	Justified: City Primeval	Sandy	Miniseries; main role
2026–present	R.J. Decker	Catherine Delacroix	Main cast

=== Stage ===
Year	Title	Role	Theater
2016	Hold On to Me Darling	Essie	Atlantic Theater Company
2018	The Hard Problem	Hilary	Lincoln Center
2024	Hold On to Me Darling	Essie	Lucille Lortel Theatre

== Awards and nominations ==
Award	Year (Note: Indicates the year of ceremony. Each year is linked to the article about the awards held that year, wherever possible.)	Category	Nominated work	Result	Ref.
Logie Awards	2008	Graham Kennedy Award for Most Outstanding New Talent	Love My Way	Nominated	
