= Aglaophotis =

Purported magical herb

Aglaophotis is a herb mentioned occasionally in works on occultism. References to aglaophotis and to olieribos (both of which are said to be magical herbs) are made in the Simon Necronomicon.

== Historic uses ==
The Greek doctor Dioscorides named aglaophotis as a member of the peony family, Paeoniaceae. It has been speculated that the species Paeonia officinalis, the European peony, is the source of aglaophotis, but there is too little evidence for this theory to be proven.

According to Dioscorides, peony is used for warding off demons, witchcraft, and fever. This is at odds with the presentation in the Simon Necronomicon released twenty centuries later, in which it is used to call upon dark forces.

== In popular culture ==
Aglaophotis is portrayed throughout the Silent Hill video game series as a fluid or tablet which can expel monstrous parasites from characters' bodies.

The herb appears as a species of sentient, hostile plant monsters in Final Fantasy XI.

In the Book of Hours video game, the player can gather flowers named Aglaophotis.

== See also ==
- Cortex moutan, use of peony in Chinese medicine
