= M. J. Bassett =

British film director and screenwriter

- Born: Newport, England, UK
- Education: Adams Grammar School
- Occupations: Screenwriter; film director; television director; television producer; television writer; film producer
- Children: 3

M. J. Bassett (born Michael J. Bassett) is a British film and television writer, director, and producer. She began her career directing the cult horror films Deathwatch (2002) and Wilderness (2006). She also directed the dark fantasy Solomon Kane (2009) and the video game adaptation Silent Hill: Revelation (2012). Since 2012, she has worked as a director, writer, and producer on television series such as Strike Back, Ash vs Evil Dead, Power, and Altered Carbon.

== Early life ==
Bassett grew up in Newport, Shropshire, in the West Midlands, where she was educated at Adams Grammar School. Bassett described this as a "safe, unremarkable childhood". She developed an obsession with wildlife and nature; Bassett's fascination with films would not arise until much later. Bassett's childhood aspirations were to be a wildlife veterinarian in Africa. Because of her grades in school, a veterinary career became out of the question, and at the age of 16, Bassett left school and became a wildlife filmmaker's assistant, where she would spend 18 months learning photography and film making.

== Career ==
After her time as an assistant, Bassett went back to school to do A-Levels in the hopes of getting a Zoology degree. Once back in school, Bassett wrote to a variety of TV producers, looking for work as a nature presenter. Eventually, Bassett was contacted by Janet Street-Porter, shortly after which she began working as a presenter on the children's show Get Fresh, where she presented the science and nature segments. She left to work on other programs, but as work stopped coming in, she was losing interest. At this point, Bassett realized that she wanted to make films. Since moving into film-making would entail substantial risk, Bassett worked for a year animating and voicing the puppet Scally the Dog on Children's ITV while she considered the career change.

Bassett then produced several short films, as well as a 16 mm piece for broadcast television. All the while, Bassett worked on feature scripts which she used to try to catch producers' attention. After a period of years, Bassett's screenplay titled No Man's Land generated significant interest. Many studios offered to purchase the script, but Bassett was determined to direct the film of her screenplay. Eventually, one production company consented to this, and the film was retitled Deathwatch.

She directed Red Sonja (2025), after it had been reported Hannah John-Kamen and Joey Soloway had departed from the film.

== Personal life ==
In 2017, Bassett came out as trans. She has two daughters and a son.

== Filmography ==
=== Film ===
Year	Title	Director	Writer	Producer	Notes
2002	Deathwatch	Yes	Yes	Associate	Grand Prize of European Fantasy Film in Silver; Nominated – International Fantasy Film Award for Best Film; Nominated – Grand Prize of European Fantasy Film in Gold; Nominated – Molodist Festival Award for Best Feature Fiction Film; Nominated – Neuchâtel Narcisse Award for Best Feature Film; Nominated – Sitges Maria Award for Best Film
2002	The Abduction Club	2nd unit	No	No	
2006	Wilderness	Yes	No	No	
2009	Solomon Kane	Yes	Yes	No	Fantasporto Audience Jury Award
2012	Silent Hill: Revelation	Yes	Yes	No	Nominated – Rondo Hatton Classic Horror Award for Best Film
2019	Inside Man: Most Wanted	Yes	No	No	
2020	Rogue	Yes	Yes	Yes	Wrote the screenplay with her daughter, Isabel
2021	Endangered Species	Yes	Yes	Yes	Wrote the screenplay with her daughter, Isabel
2025	Red Sonja	Yes	No	No	Did rewrite the script based on original script by Tasha Huo.

==== As a film crew ====
- Shooting Fish (1997) (Electronic Press Kit Producer)
- Waking Ned (1998) (Electronic Press Kit Director/Producer)
- Gabriel & Me (2001) (Electronic Press Kit Director)
- Close Your Eyes (2002) (Electronic Press Kit)

=== Television ===
Year	Title	Director	Writer	Producer	Notes
1998	Bugs	No	Yes	No	3 episodes
2012–18	Strike Back	Yes	Yes	Executive	15 episodes
2013	Da Vinci's Demons	Yes	No	No	2 episodes
2015	The Player	Yes	No	No	2 episodes
2015–16	Ash vs Evil Dead	Yes	Yes	No	4 episodes
2015–18	Power	Yes	No	No	4 episodes
2018	Taken	Yes	No	No	Episode: "Imperium"
2018	Iron Fist	Yes	No	No	Episode: "Target: Iron Fist"
2018	Nightflyers	Yes	No	No	Episode: "Greywing"
2019	Altered Carbon	Yes	No	No	2 episodes
2020	Motherland: Fort Salem	Yes	No	No	Episode: "Bellweather Season"
2022	Reacher	Yes	No	No	Episode: "Pie"
2022	The Terminal List	Yes	No	No	Episode: "Consolidation"
2023	Quantum Leap	Yes	No	No	Episode: "The Lonely Hearts Club"
2024	The Equalizer	Yes	No	No	Episode: "The Whistleblower"
2025	FUBAR	Yes	No	No	Episode: "Dam It"
2025	NCIS: Tony & Ziva	Yes	No	No	2 episodes
2026	Neagley	Yes	No	No	2 episodes
