= Characters of the Silent Hill series =

Characters of the Silent Hill series may refer to:

- List of Silent Hill characters, the cast of the first game.
- List of Silent Hill 2 characters
