= Sébastien Pan =

French composer and musician (born 1984)

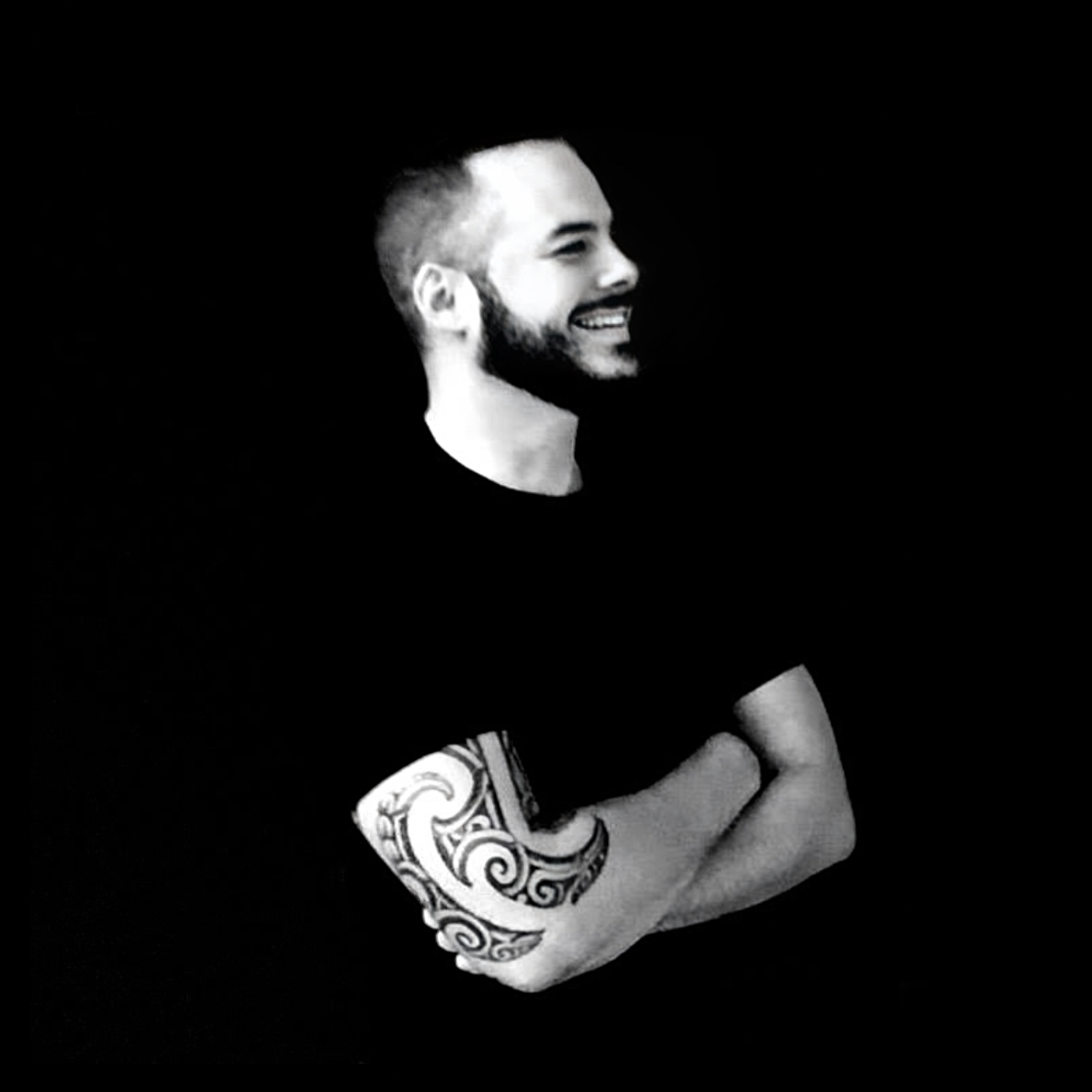
- Sébastien Pan

Background information
- Born: 9 July 1984 (age 42); Montbéliard, France
- Genres: Film score, Orchestral
- Occupation: Composer
- Years active: 2011 – present
- Website: www.sebastienpan.com

Sébastien Pan (born 9 July 1984) is a French composer and musician, best known for his work on motion picture and animated TV series. He is a permanent resident of New Zealand since 2015.

== Biography ==
Born in Montbéliard, France, Sébastien Pan gained experience writing music for motion pictures, animated TV series and TV commercials at Imaginex Studios, an international award-winning audio post-production house.

Besides writing for live action movies and TV series, Sebastien began his collaboration with the director Wang YunFei in scoring the animated film Yugo & Lala in 2012, followed by Yugo & Lala 2 in 2014 and Kwai Boo, Crazy Space Adventure in 2015. Kwai Boo marks the first time a Chinese animation project has received investment from a Hollywood giant, in this case 20th Century Fox.

== Filmography ==
=== Film ===
Year	Film	Director	Note
2011	The Beginning To Get Bald	Naman Goyal	
2011	KL Gangster	Syafiq Yusof	
2012	Yugo & Lala	Wang YunFei	
2013	KL Zombi	Woo Ming Jin	
2014	Abang Long Fadil	Syafiq Yusof	
2014	Yugo & Lala 2	Wang YunFei	
2014	Divergent	Neil Burger	Additional Music
2014	Deliver Us From Evil	Scott Derrickson	Additional Music
2015	Kwai Boo	Wang YunFei	
2015	Villa Nabila	Syafiq Yusof	
2015	The Divergent Series: Insurgent	Robert Schwentke	Additional Music
2015	The Final Master	Haofeng Xu	Composer - Trailer music
2015	Saving Mr. Wu	Ding Sheng	Composer - Trailer music
2016	Munafik	Syafiq Yusof	
2016	Shed Skin Papa	Roy Szeto	Composer - Trailer music
2016	Railroad Tigers	Ding Sheng	Composer - Trailer music
2017	Kung Fu Yoga	Stanley Tong	Composer - Trailer music
2017	KL Wangan	Pekin Ibrahim	
2018	The Prey	Jimmy Henderson	
2018	Yugo & Lala 4	Wang Yunfei	
2018	Blood of Jerusalem	Jonathan Zsofi	
2018	Munafik 2	Syafiq Yusof	
2018	Mortal Engines	Christian Rivers	Additional music
2018	Solo: A Star Wars Story	Ron Howard	Additional music
2019	Annabelle Comes Home	Gary Dauberman	Additional music
2019	The Angry Birds Movie 2	John Rice	Additional music
2019	Terminator: Dark Fate	Tim Miller	Additional music
2020	Terraforma	Drew MacPowell	
2020	Spell	Mark Tonderai	
2021	The Conjuring: The Devil Made Me Do It	Michael Chaves	Additional music
2021	Midnight	Oh-Seun kwon	
2021	The 8th Night	Kim Tae-Hyung	
2022	Doctor Strange in the Multiverse of Madness	Sam Raimi	Additional music
2022	Paws of Fury: The Legend of Hank	Chris Bailey	Additional music
2022	Luck	Peggy Holmes	Additional music
2022	Dark Nature	Berkley Brady	
2023	Get in the dark	Ching Si-Yu	
2023	Share?	Ira Rosensweig	

=== Television ===
Year	Title	Studio(s)	Notes
2013–2014	Ninja Cat, Ichi, Ni, San	Avant Garde Studios	2 seasons – 52 episodes
2015–2016	Chuck Chicken	Animasia	1 season – 52 episodes
2015–2016	The Insectibles	One Animation	1 season – 52 episodes
2017–2020	Chuck Chicken, Power Up	Animasia	2 seasons – 52 episodes
2019	Hard Boiled	One animation	Pilot episode
2019–2020	Antiks	One Animation	1 season — 52 episodes
2016 – present	Oddbods	One Animation	6 seasons – 148 episodes
2020	Sweet Home	Studio Dragon	1 season - 10 episodes (Additional music)
2022	Red Rose	Eleven	1 season - 8 episodes (Additional music)

=== TV commercials ===
Pan also scored more than 60 international TV commercials and worked with renowned advertising agencies such as Saatchi and Saatchi, Leo Burnett Worldwide, DDB, The Agency, etc...

=== Book Soundtrack ===
In 2013, he wrote a 52-minute symphonic piece based on the fantasy novel "Autre Monde – L'Alliance des Trois" written by the best selling French author Maxime Chattam.
