= Algonova =

Algonova may refer to:

- Algonova (1968), a single-hulled oil tanker
- Algonova (2008), a double-hulled tanker
