= Groupe Desgagnés =

Canadian shipping company

Groupe Desgagnés is a Canadian shipping firm. It operates a fleet of nineteen vessels. Gross earnings in 2014 were around $230 million.

== Desgagnes Transarctik ==
Desgagnés Transarctik, a subsidiary of Groupe Desgagnés, is partners with Arctic Co-operatives Limited, the Qikiqtaaluk Corporation, Sakku Investments Corporation and the Kitikmeot Corporation. Operating as Nunavut Sealink and Supply Incorporated they provide annual sealift to Canadian Arctic communities.

== Fleet ==
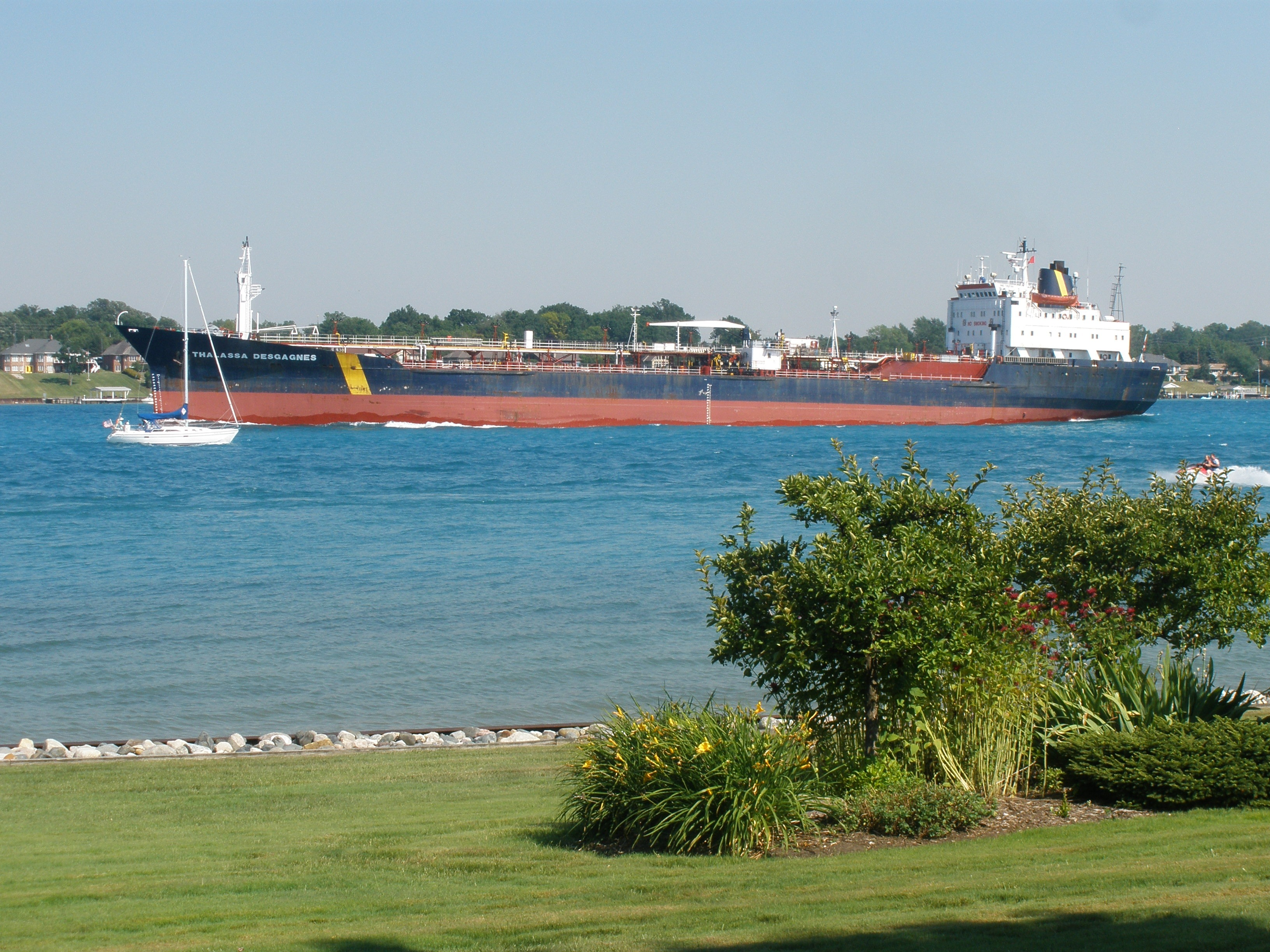
The tanker Thalassa Desgagnes

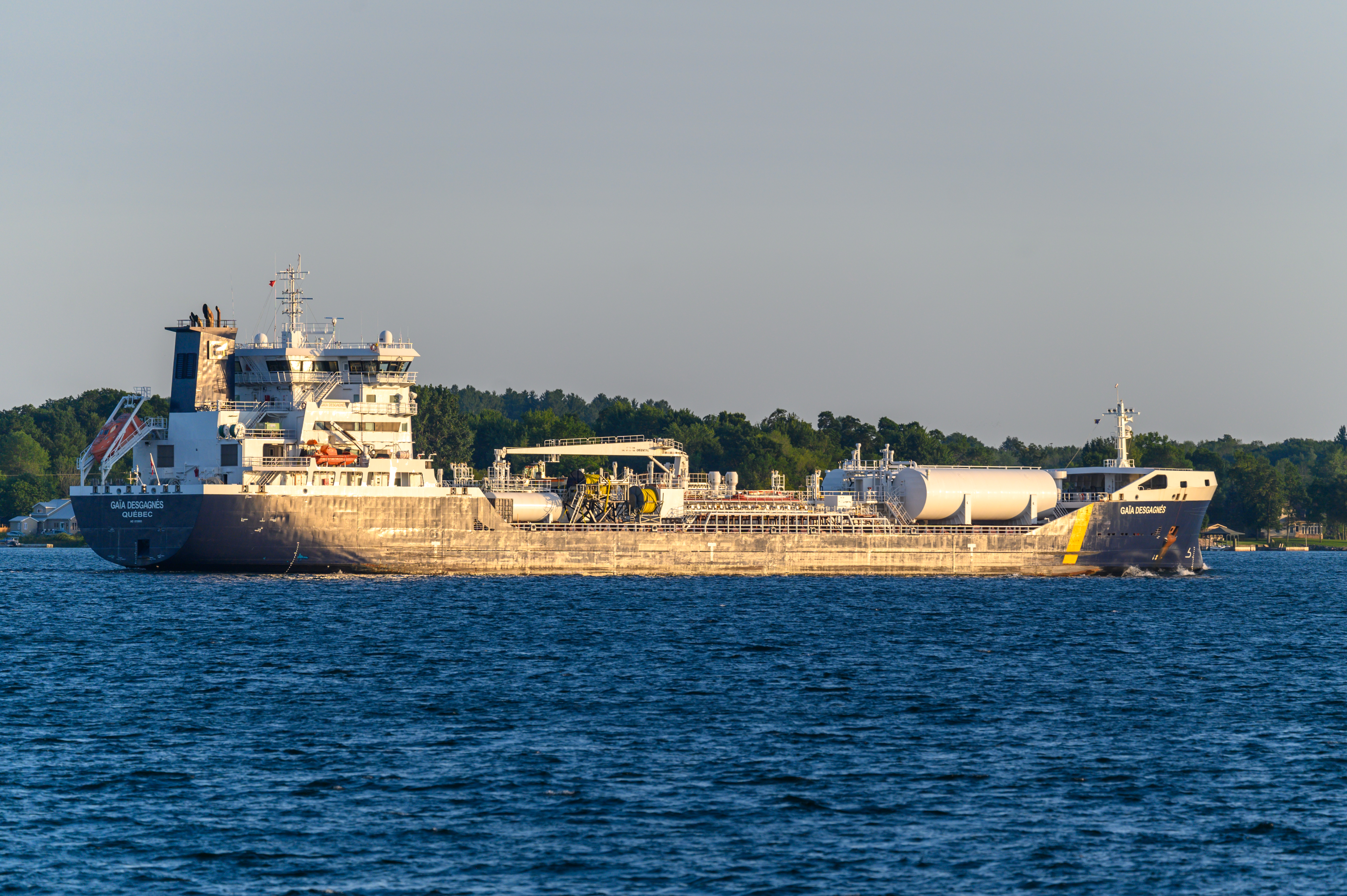
Dual-fuel LNG chemical/oil products tanker, MT Gaïa Desgagnés on the St. Lawrence Seaway, Canada

All vessels fly the Canadian flag and are operated by Canadian crews, except a few vessels when used for international trade. Mathilda Desgagnés was part of the fleet until her sale in 2007.

=== Tankers ===
- Damia Desgagnés, Mia Desgagnés, Paul A. Desgagnés and Rossi A. Desgagnés: tankers with dual-fuel Wärtsilä 5RT-flex 60DF propulsion engines allowing the use of liquefied natural gas (LNG), marine diesel oil (MDO) or heavy fuel oil (HFO), built in Turkey in 2016. They have ice class Polar 7.
- Dara Desgagnés: chemical tanker
- Espada Desgagnés and Laurentia Desgagnés: Panamax tanker vessels for the transportation of crude oil.
- Esta Desgagnés: chemical tanker
- Gaïa Desgagnés: chemical product carrier
- Jana Desgagnés
- Laurentia Desgagnés: a Panamax tanker vessel dedicated to the transportation of crude oil
- Maria Desgagnés: a double-hulled tanker for transporting chemicals
- Sarah Desgagnés: double-hulled oil and chemical tanker built in Tuzla, Turkey in 2007.
- Thalassa Desgagnes: double-hulled oil and asphalt tanker, no longer in use, replaced by Damia Desgagnés and Mia Desgagnés.

=== Cargo carriers ===
- Acadia Desgagnés: multi-purpose dry cargo ship
- Amélia Desgagnés: general cargo carrier rated Lloyd's 100 1A for navigation through ice. (No longer active since 2017)
- Anna Desgagnés: multi-purpose roll-on/roll-off vessel equipped with a crane capable of lifting up to 125 tons (Sold and scrapped in 2017)
- Argentia Desgagnés: general cargo ship, heavy cargo
- Camilla Desgagnés roll-on/roll-off cargo carrier (Sold in December 2017 and bound for further service in Russia)
- Claude A. Desgagnés: heavy lift multi-purpose dry cargo vessel with tweendeck
- Damia Desgagnés
- Mathilda Desgagnés
- Miena Desgagnés: multi-purpose heavy lift ship
- Nordika Desgagnés: multi-purpose dry cargo ship
- Marcellin A. Desgagnés: multi-purpose dry cargo ship
- Rosaire A. Desgagnés: multi-purpose dry cargo ship, equipped for carriage of containers, strengthened for heavy cargo
- Sedna Desgagnés: multi-purpose tweendeck, lo-lo cargo ship
- Taïga Desgagnés: multi-purpose dry cargo ship
- Thalassa Desgagnes
- Zélada Desgagnés: sister ship of Sedna Desgagnés, multi-purpose dry cargo ship, equipped for carriage of containers, strengthened for heavy cargo

=== Cargo and passenger carrier ===
- Bella Desgagnés: From mid-April to mid-January, Bella Desgagnés serves the Lower North shore of the Côte-Nord region of Quebec transporting passengers and cargo. The trip from Rimouski to Blanc-Sablon is a one-week round trip, calling (in the downstream direction) at Sept-Îles, Port-Menier on Anticosti Island, Havre-Saint-Pierre, Natashquan, Kegaska, La Romaine, Harrington Harbour, Tête-à-la-Baleine, La Tabatière and Saint-Augustin.The voyage downstream starts Tuesday morning from Rimouski and arrives in Blanc Sablon Friday morning. The ship then returns upstream.
- Nordik Express.
