= Berkley Brady =

Canadian filmmaker

- Born: Edmonton, Alberta, Canada
- Education: Master of Fine Arts, Columbia University
- Occupation(s): Film director, screenwriter
- Spouse: Ian Lister
- Children: 1
- Relatives: James P. Brady (great-uncle)
- Website: nikaproductions.co

Berkley Brady is a Canadian filmmaker. She is known for writing and directing the 2022 horror film Dark Nature.

== Early life ==
Brady is Métis. She spent her early childhood near Edmonton, later moving to Calgary in 1986 when she was six years old. Her great-uncle, James P. Brady, was a Métis activist who disappeared in 1967.

Brady studied creative writing at the University of Victoria, and received her master's degree at Columbia University in New York City.

== Career ==
Prior to her directorial debut, Brady participated in the production of several short films and directed episodes of Secret History of the Wild West, an Aboriginal Peoples Television Network documentary series.

In 2022, Brady wrote and directed the horror film Dark Nature in her directorial debut. The film stars Hannah Emily Anderson, Madison Walsh, Roseanne Supernault and Kyra Harper. The film premiered at the Fantasia International Film Festival in the same year and was screened at the Cannes Marché du Film. It was well-received by critics, with Rachel Reeves of Rue Morgue magazine calling the film "a vital feature debut with a strong voice, style and story", adding that Brady "mixes up a tasty cinematic cocktail strongly infused with her own creative flavor."

Brady is working on an adaptation of Halfbreed, a 1973 memoir by Maria Campbell.

== Personal life ==
Brady lives in Calgary, Alberta with her husband Ian Lister, a cinematographer, and their son. Lister was the cinematographer of Brady's thesis film.
