= Kelvin Redvers =

Canadian film director

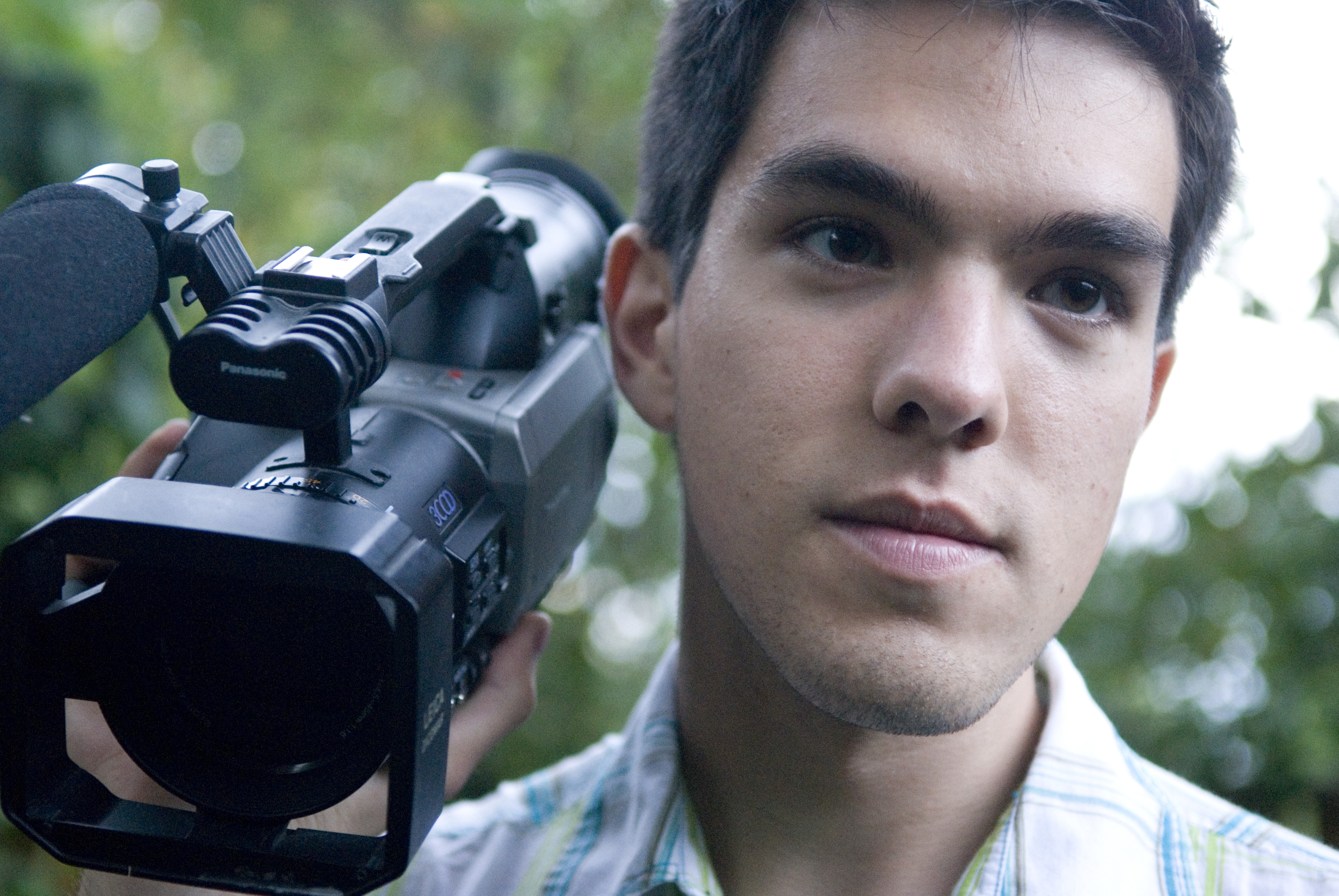
Kelvin Redvers in 2007

Kelvin Redvers is a producer and film director who belongs to the Deninu Kųę́ First Nation.

== Biography ==
Kelvin Redvers grew up in Hay River, Northwest Territories. He majored in film production and graduated in June 2010 with a Bachelor of Fine Arts from Simon Fraser University in Vancouver, British Columbia, where he gained the proficiency for writing and directing his first short films Playing Cards (2007) and The Night the Robber Came (2009). His work covers both Aboriginal and non-Aboriginal topics as well as First Nations community and aboriginal current affairs.

Redvers received his first nationwide Bravo! Canada broadcast credit at the age of 21, for The Making of a Haida Totem Pole. Redvers' documentary television series for Knowledge Network titled Our First Voices (2012) proved Redvers as an up-and-coming filmmaker. Because of the success of Our First Voices, Redvers, at the age of 23, was hired in September 2010 by CTV as a producer of CTV-BC's First Story, a Vancouver-based television series and production company that detail Canadian Aboriginal concerns. Over the course of three seasons, as of 2014, Redvers had produced twelve episodes for First Story.

=== Toronto International Film Festival ===
In May 2011, Redvers applied for a film grant through BravoFACT (Foundation to Assist Canadian Talent). The funding that he received through BravoFACT allowed Redvers the opportunity to make the seven-minute short film The Dancing Cop. In September 2012, The Dancing Cop premiered in the Short Cuts section at the Toronto International Film Festival and at the Oldenburg Film Festival in Germany.

== 'We Matter' Campaign (2016-present) ==
In October 2016, Kelvin Redvers and his sister T'áncháy Redvers launched 'We Matter', a national online campaign designed to bring awareness to the struggles of Indigenous youth across Canada. It is modelled after Dan Savage's 'It Gets Better' campaign and collects videos and writings from each Indigenous community across Canada with the aim of reducing the number of indigenous teen suicides, while also providing them with mental health resources. Redvers mails the We Matter videos on USB drives to Indigenous communities across Canada who do not have internet access.

== High Arctic Haulers ==
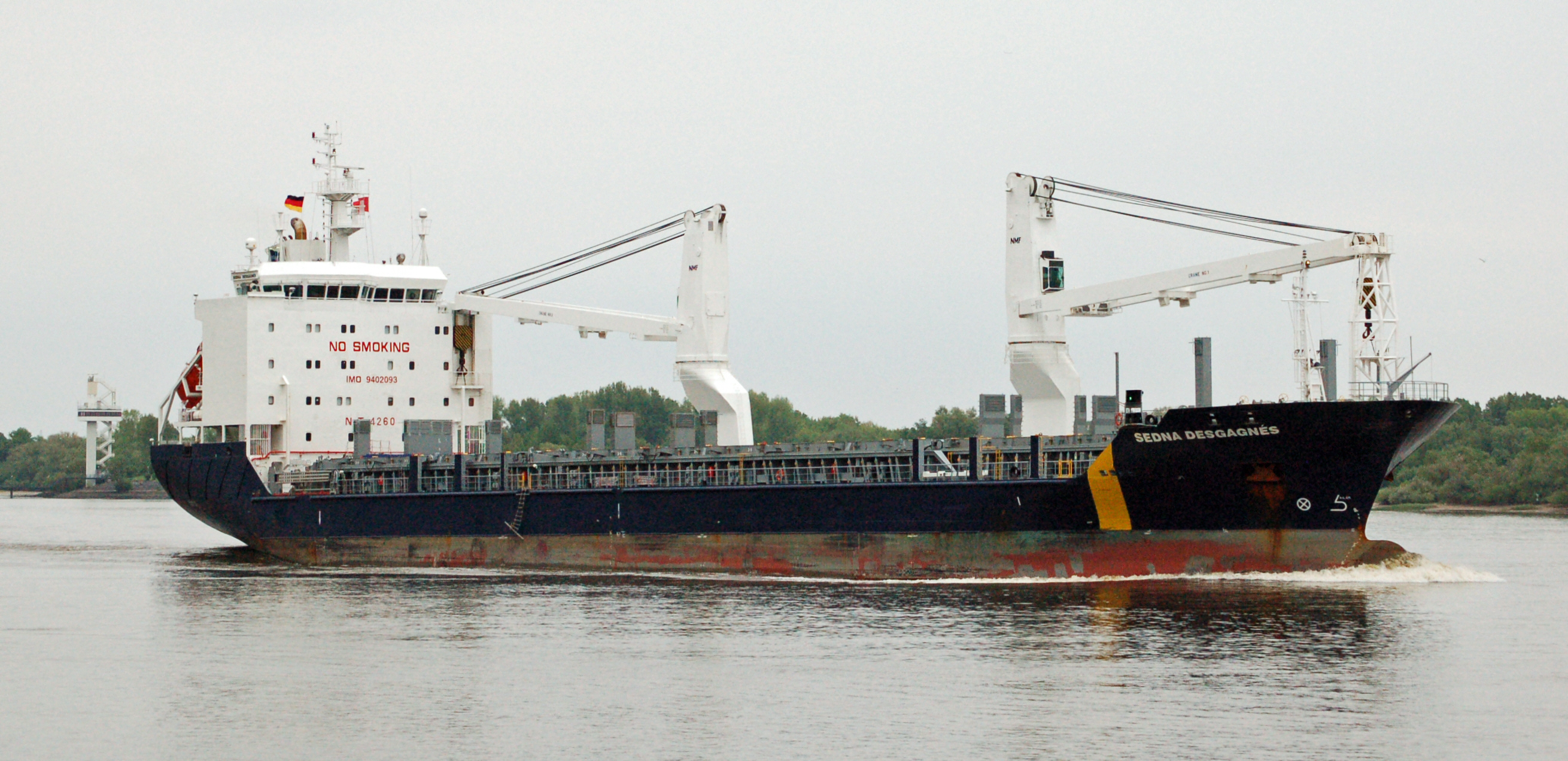
The Sedna Desgagnes was one of sealift vessels where Redver's film crews were embedded for the filming of High Arctic Haulers.

Redvers is the series creator for the documentary series High Arctic Haulers, and directed several of its segments. The series follows the hard and challenging work of the men and women behind the annual sealift that brings almost all of the supplies to the many Northern communities not served by roads. Redvers told Nunavut News that he first conceived the idea for the show in 2015, and that part of his motivation was dissatisfaction with how the North was portrayed by film-makers from the south.

Redvers said this was his largest production so far, and that he was managing multiple crews aboard multiple vessels. Redvers said that he had included profiles of First Nations youth taking leadership roles.

== Film Awards and Recognition ==
- Golden Starfish award for "Best Young Videomaker" at the Hamptons International Film Festival (won)
- Rising Star Award for Excellence in Filmmaking at the Canada International Film Festival (won)
- Best Film in the Drama Category at the International Student Film Festival (won)
- Gordon Shrum Gold Medal (2010, won)
- Jack Webster Award (2011, won for Black Blood—Tainted Land, Dying Caribou)
- Jack Webster Award (2012, won for First Story, episode "A Home for Edgar')
- RTDNA Trina McQueen Award from the Association of Electronic Journalists (2012, won for Death of a Carver)

== Filmography ==
Year	Title	Contribution
2007	Playing Cards (short)	Director
2007	Past The Skin (short)	Camera and Electrical (grip)
2007	Project Alice (short)	Assistant Camera/Camera Operator
2008	A Look at the Life of Morgan Green (short)	Director/Producer/Editor/Cinematographer/Publicist
2009	Firebear Called them Faith Healers (short)	Director/Producer/Editor
2009	The Night the Robber Came (short)	Director/Producer/Writer/Editor/Publicist
2010	Kids Court (short)	Director/Producer/Writer
2010	Joan's Account (short)	Boom Operator
2010	Pokémon Apokélypse (short)	Actor
2010	Two Indians Talking (short)	Camera and Electrical (grip/second assistant camera)
2010	Our First Voices (Television Documentary Series)	Director
2011 --	First Story (television)	Director/Producer
2012	The Dancing Cop (short)	Director/Writer/Producer
2013	Evangeline (feature film)	Actor
2014	Rattlesnake (short)	Director/Producer/Writer
2014	Kagagi (television series)	Actor
2024	Cold Road	Director, producer, writer
