= Algonova (1969) =

History
- Name: Texaco Chief (1969–1986); A.G. Farquharson (1986–1998); Algonova (1998–2006); Pacifico Trader (2007–2012); Great Portobello (2012–present)
- Port of registry: Panama City
- Builder: Collingwood Shipbuilding
- Yard number: 193
- Laid down: 23 July 1968
- Launched: 10 April 1969
- Identification: IMO number: 6903981; MMSI number: 372498000; Callsign: 3EJF4
- Status: Active

General characteristics (as built)
- Type: Oil tanker
- Tonnage: 5,038 GRT; 6,538 DWT
- Length: 400 ft 6 in (122.1 m) oa; 369 ft 9 in (112.7 m) pp
- Beam: 54 ft 2 in (16.5 m)
- Depth: 26 ft 5 in (8.1 m)
- Ice class: Lloyd's Class 2
- Propulsion: 2 × 2,000 bhp (1,491 kW) 12-cylinder Fairbanks Morse 12-38D8-1/8 marine diesel engines; Single shaft; 1 × 350 hp (261 kW) bow thruster
- Speed: 13 knots (24 km/h; 15 mph)
- Capacity: 54,241 barrels (8,623.6 m^{3}) oil

Algonova was a single-hulled oil tanker launched in 1969 as Texaco Chief for Texaco Canada Ltd. In 1986, the ship was renamed A. G. Farquharson. In 1995 the ship was sold to Imperial Oil. Purchased by Algoma Central in 1998, the ship was renamed Algonova. In 2007, Algoma Central sold the vessel to Belgrave Investors Corporation, which renamed the vessel Pacifico Trader. Helmer Business Incorporated acquired the vessel in 2012 and renamed the ship Great Portobello. The vessel is currently in active service.

== Description ==
The ship was initially designed as a crane ship. However, the plan was abandoned and the vessel was re-designed as a single-hulled tanker. As built, the vessel was 400 ft 6 in (122.1 m) long overall and 369 ft 9 in (112.7 m) between perpendiculars and a beam of 54 ft 2 in (16.5 m). The vessel's gross register tonnage (GRT) was 5,038 and deadweight tonnage (DWT) of 6,358. The ship has a depth of hold of 26 ft 5 in (8.1 m). The vessel had an initial ice class rating of Lloyd's Class 2, being built with an ice knife, but that was not renewed under its current ownership. The ship is powered by two Fairbanks Morse 12-38D8-1/8 12-cylinder diesel engines rated at 2,000 brake horsepower (1,500 kW). Fueled by marine diesel oil, the vessel is propelled by a single controllable pitch propeller and a 350 horsepower (260 kW) bow thruster. The ship has a maximum speed of 13 knots (24 km/h; 15 mph). The vessel has a current tonnage of 4,605 GRT and 6,996 DWT. The ship has a capacity of 54,241 barrels (8,623.6 m^{3}) of oil.

== Service history ==
The ship was laid down on 23 July 1968 by Collingwood Shipbuilding of Collingwood, Ontario, as a crane vessel for Yankcanuck Steamships Ltd. of Sault Ste. Marie, Ontario. In September 1968 the company decided not to build the ship, and the hull was sold to Texaco Canada Ltd., and redesigned as a single-hulled tanker. The ship was launched on 10 April 1969, and named Texaco Chief. She served on the Great Lakes, the Saint Lawrence River, and on the eastern coast of Canada. On 7 December 1969, Texaco Chief collided with MV Petite Hermine in fog near Prescott, Ontario. Texaco Chief suffered minor damage and was repaired by Canadian Vickers in Montreal, Quebec. The ship ran aground on 4 December 1972 near Ogdensburg, New York. The ship suffered no damage. In 1986 Texaco Chief was renamed A.G. Farquharson, after the former president and CEO of Texaco Canada. The ship was purchased by Imperial Oil in 1995 and kept in service until laid up at Halifax, Nova Scotia in October 1996.

The ship was purchased by Algoma Tankers Limited, a subsidiary of Algoma Central, in early 1998 and renamed Algonova. She operated mainly between Sarnia and Thunder Bay, until new regulations requiring double-hulled tankers in North American ports came into force in 2005. A new double-hulled tanker of the same name entered service in 2008.

In 2006 the ship was sold to the Belgrave Investors Corporation of Panama City, Panama, and renamed Pacifico Trader. In January 2007 she sailed for Panama where she operated as a bunker ship. In 2012, the ship was acquired by Helmer Business Incorporated of Panama City. The ship was renamed Great Portobello.
