= Asphalt Princess =

Double-hulled tanker

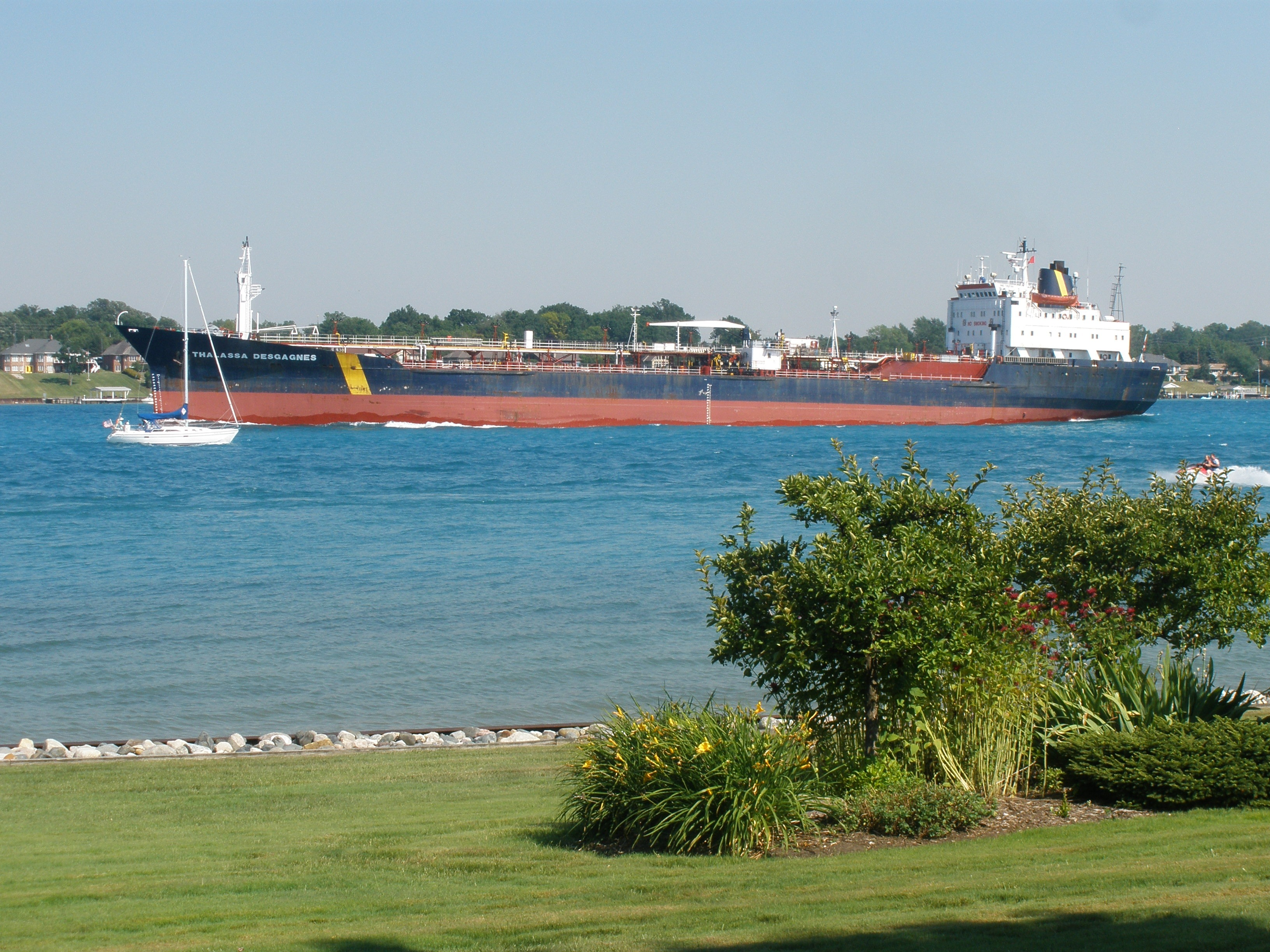
- Thalassa Desgagnes

History
- Name: Joasla (1976–1979); Orinoco (1979–1981); Rio Orinoco (1981–1993); Thalassa Desgagnes (1993–2017); Asphalt Princess (2017–present)
- Port of registry: (Norway) Oslo (1976–1979); Sweden (1979–1981); (Cyprus) Limassol (1981–1993); Canada (1993–2017); (Panama) Malakal Harbour (2017–present)
- Builder: Ankerlokken Glommen, Fredrikstad, Norway
- Yard number: 189
- Laid down: May 1975
- Launched: 19 December 1975
- Completed: 8 May 1976
- In service: 1976
- Identification: IMO number: 7382988
- Status: In service

General characteristics
- Type: Tanker
- Tonnage: 5,746 GT; 9,748 DWT
- Length: 134.6 m (441 ft 7 in) oa; 127.2 m (417 ft 4 in) pp
- Beam: 17.2 m (56 ft 5 in)
- Installed power: Diesel engine, 3,700 kW (5,000 bhp)
- Propulsion: 1 shaft
- Speed: 14 knots (26 km/h; 16 mph)

Asphalt Princess is a double-hulled tanker used to transport bitumen and asphalt. It is currently operated by Asphalt Princess Shipping. The ship was launched on 19 December 1975 and completed in 1976 by Ankerlokken Glommen of Frederikstad, Norway. Initially named Joasla, the vessel was sold in 1979 and renamed Orinoco, then again in 1981 to Rio Orinoco. As Rio Orinoco, the vessel went aground on Anticosti Island in the Gulf of St. Lawrence in October 1990 and spilled 200 metric tons (200 long tons; 220 short tons) of oil into the gulf before being freed. The ship was acquired by Groupe Desgagné following this and renamed Thalassa Desgagnes. While in service with Groupe Desgagné, the vessel suffered a fire and ran aground. Asphalt Princess Shipping purchased the ship in 2017.

On 3 August 2021, Asphalt Princess was widely reported in international media as the target of a hijacking in the Gulf of Oman, 97 kilometres (60 mi) east of the port of Fujairah in the United Arab Emirates. The hijackers were allegedly backed by Iran. Ships nearby in the Gulf of Oman were advised to exercise “extreme caution” by the United Kingdom Maritime Trade Operations (UKMTO) earlier in the day. The boarders left the ship the next day.

== Description ==
The vessel is a double-hulled tanker used to transport bitumen and asphalt which was originally measured in 1976 at 5,895 gross register tons (GRT) and 9,750 tons deadweight (DWT) when built. The ship was later remeasured in 1995 as 5,746 gross tonnage (GT) and 9,748 DWT. Asphalt Princess is 134.6 metres (441 ft 7 in) long overall and 127.2 m (417 ft 4 in) between perpendiculars with a beam of 17.2 m (56 ft 5 in) and while operating on the St. Lawrence Seaway, had a midsummer draught of 7.9 m (26 ft) with a depth of 9.78 m (32 ft 1 in).

The tanker is powered by a 3,700-kilowatt (5,000 bhp) diesel engine turning one shaft. This gives the vessel a maximum speed of 14 knots (26 km/h; 16 mph). As designed, the ship was capable of carrying 9,748 metric tons (9,594 long tons; 10,745 short tons) or 67,259 barrels (10,693.3 m^{3}) at a mid-summer draught of 7.90 m (25 ft 11 in).

== Construction and career ==
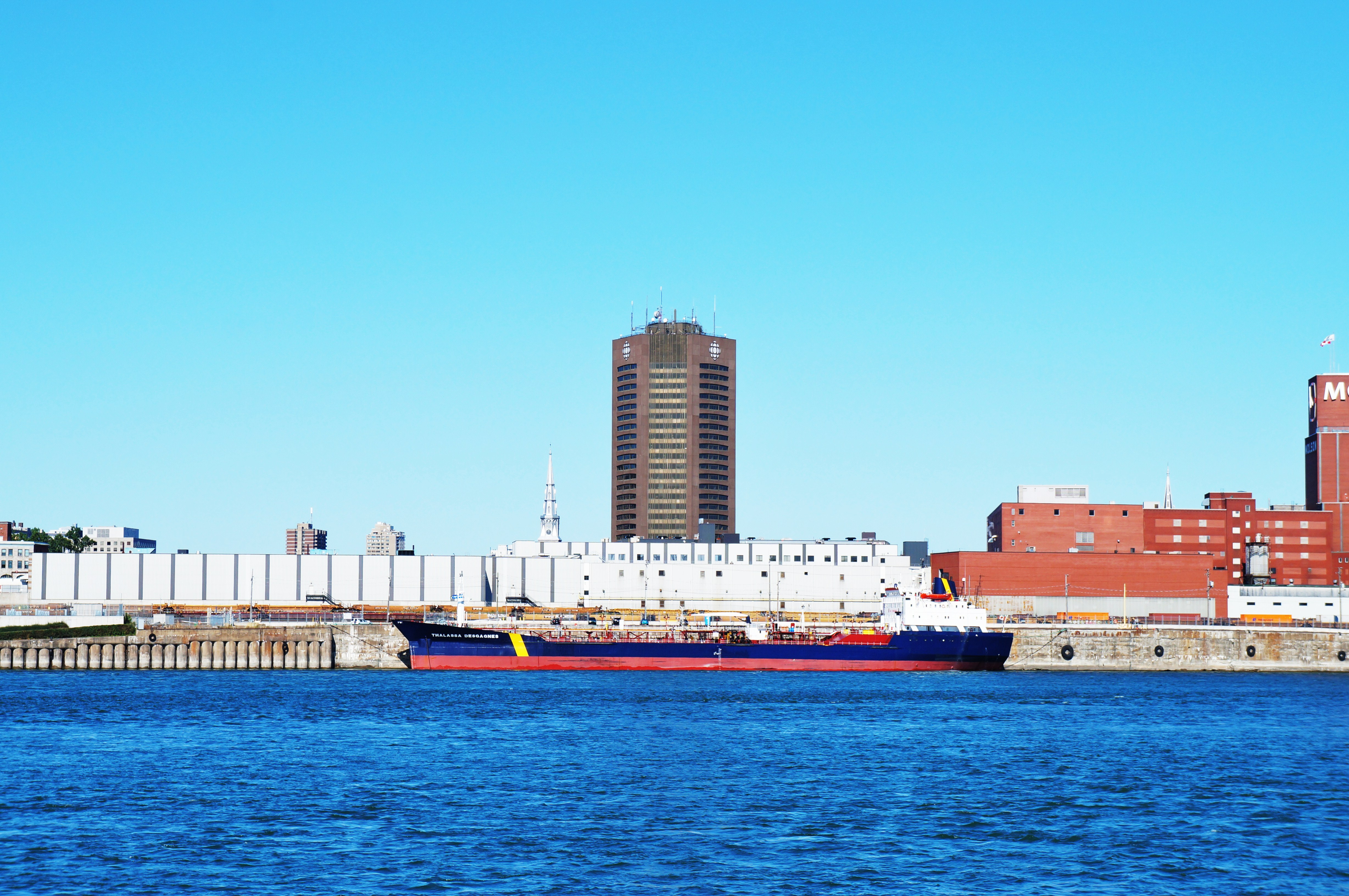
Asphalt Princess next to the Radio Canada Building in Montreal, Canada in September 2012

The tanker was constructed by Ankerlokken Glommen at their yard in Fredrikstad, Norway with the yard number 189. The vessel's keel was laid down in May 1975 and the ship was launched on 19 December 1975. Named Joasla, the tanker was completed on 8 May 1976 and handed over to its owners, I/S Joasla and registered in Oslo, Norway. In 1978, ownership of the vessel was acquired by Bjorn Ruud-Pedersen. In 1979, the vessel was acquired Bengt Anderssons Rev.Byra, registered in Sweden and renamed Orinoco.

In 1981, Horizon Development Corp Ltd purchased the ship, renamed it Rio Orinoco and registered the vessel in Limassol, Cyprus. On 16 October 1990, Rio Orinoco, with 9,080 metric tons (8,940 long tons; 10,010 short tons) of liquid asphalt aboard, ran aground on the south shore of Anticosti Island in the Gulf of St. Lawrence after developing engine problems on 15 October. The 21 crew members aboard attempted to refloat the vessel, but not before 200 tonnes (200 long tons; 220 short tons) of fuel oil spilled in the waters, though initial reports claimed nothing had spilled. Cleanup operations, coordinated by the Canadian Coast Guard, continued into November due to the remoteness of the island. On 17 October, the owners of the ship appointed salvors to removed the ship. The crew were evacuated and several attempts were made but the ship was not freed, further damaging Rio Orinoco. On 18 November, issuers declared the vessel a total loss and on 21 November, the owners formally abandoned the ship. Following this, the Canadian Coast Guard issued a contract proposal for salvors, deciding on Groupe Desgagné in mid June 1991. Groupe Desgagné was successful in its efforts in freeing the ship on 9 August.

As a salvage reward, the ship was acquired by Groupe Desgagnés and taken to MIL Davie Shipbuilding in Lauzon, Quebec to be rebuilt. The vessel re-entered service in 1993 and made its first voyage as Thalassa Desgagnes in 1994. The vessel remained in Groupe Desgagnés service until 2017, transporting asphalt from Venezuela to ports along the Atlantic coast of North America. On 13 February 2010, while moored in Montreal, welding work sparked a small explosion, and fire. The vessel's holds were empty at the time of the fire, which was quickly extinguished. One person was injured. On 6 January 2014, ice accumulation caused her to run aground on the St. Lawrence River, between Montreal and Trois-Rivières. On 3 July 2015, Groupe Desgagné announced they would be replacing Thalassa Desgagnes with a new vessel, powered by less polluting natural gas-fired engines. In 2017, the vessel was acquired by Asphalt Princess Shipping and renamed Asphalt Princess.

=== 2021 hijacking incident ===
At 14:18 UTC on 3 August 2021, watchkeepers at the United Kingdom Maritime Trade Operations (UKMTO) released a warning statement to international shipping that a "non-piracy" incident had taken place 61 nautical miles (113 km; 70 mi) east of the port of Fujairah in the United Arab Emirates (at 24.595°N 57.286°E) at 12:30 UTC. At 04:44 UTC on 4 August, UKMTO released an update declaring the incident a “potential hijacking”, where a group of eight or nine armed individuals were believed to have boarded the vessel without authorisation and ordered the ship to sail to Iran. At 05:32 UTC on 4 August, the UKMTO reported that the boarders had left the vessel and that the vessel was safe, signifying an end to the incident. At 07:26 UTC on 4 August, Al Jazeera reported on Twitter, that the Iranian Armed Forces claimed to be "providing assistance and security for merchant ships" and were ready to send “relief units” to the vessel.
