= Halfbreed (book) =

1973 memoir by Maria Campbell

- Author: Maria Campbell
- Genre: Memoir
- Publisher: McClelland and Stewart
- Publication date: 1973
- Publication place: Canada
- Pages: 184 pages pp.
- ISBN: 9780771024092

Halfbreed (sometimes known as Half-Breed) is a memoir by Maria Campbell, published by McClelland and Stewart in 1973. The book details Campbell's life growing up Métis in Saskatchewan.

The memoir has gone though several reprints, re-published most recently in 2019. This latest edition including a previously removed chapter, which detailed Campbell being sexually assaulted by an RCMP officer.

An adaptation of the book by Berkley Brady, the director of the 2022 Canadian horror film Dark Nature, is in the works.
