= Yugo & Lala 3 =

- Poster
- Chinese: 神秘世界历险记3
- Directed by: Wang Yunfei
- Production companies: Jiangsu Youman Cartoon TV; Beijing Qixinran Entertainment; Cheers Tone; Beijing Qi Cartoon Animation
- Distributed by: Eastern Mordor; Sihai Distribution Association; Beijing Weiying Shidai Technology; Gewara; Tao Piao Piao; Tianjin Huayi Brothers Blockbuster Films
- Release date: 29 July 2016
- Running time: 82 minutes
- Country: China
- Language: Mandarin
- Box office: CN¥64.9 million

Yugo & Lala 3 is a 2016 Chinese animated fantasy adventure film directed by Wang Yunfei. The third film in the Yugo & Lala film series, it was preceded by 2014's Yugo & Lala 2. It was released in China by 29 July 2016.

== Plot ==
An ancient mask breaks the peaceful life of the people in the mysterious world, and an inevitable war is about to break out. To stop the war, the new leader Lala asks her friend Wang Hugo from the human world to come back for help, but the naughty Hugo brings his father Wang Dashan into the mysterious world. Faced with the sudden changes around him and the fear of the unknown, Wang Dashan, who loves his daughter dearly, panics and makes a fool of himself.

Lala, Wang Hugo, Wang Dashan, and Uncle Bear, a straightforward and naive bear, set off on a journey to stop the war.

== Cast ==
- Liu Xiaoyu
- Meng Quanlin
- Lu Kui
- Baomu Zhongyang
- Guo Zhengjian
- Bai Xuecen
- Liu Qianhan
- Wang Linxi
- Zhang Yutong
- Deng Weifeng
- Feng Sheng
- Yang Tianxiang
- Su Shangqing
- Chen Liyang
- Guo Haoran
- Chen Meijun
- Xie Yaxin
- Han Xiao

== Reception ==
The film has grossed CN¥64.9 million at the Chinese box office.
