= Algonova (2008) =

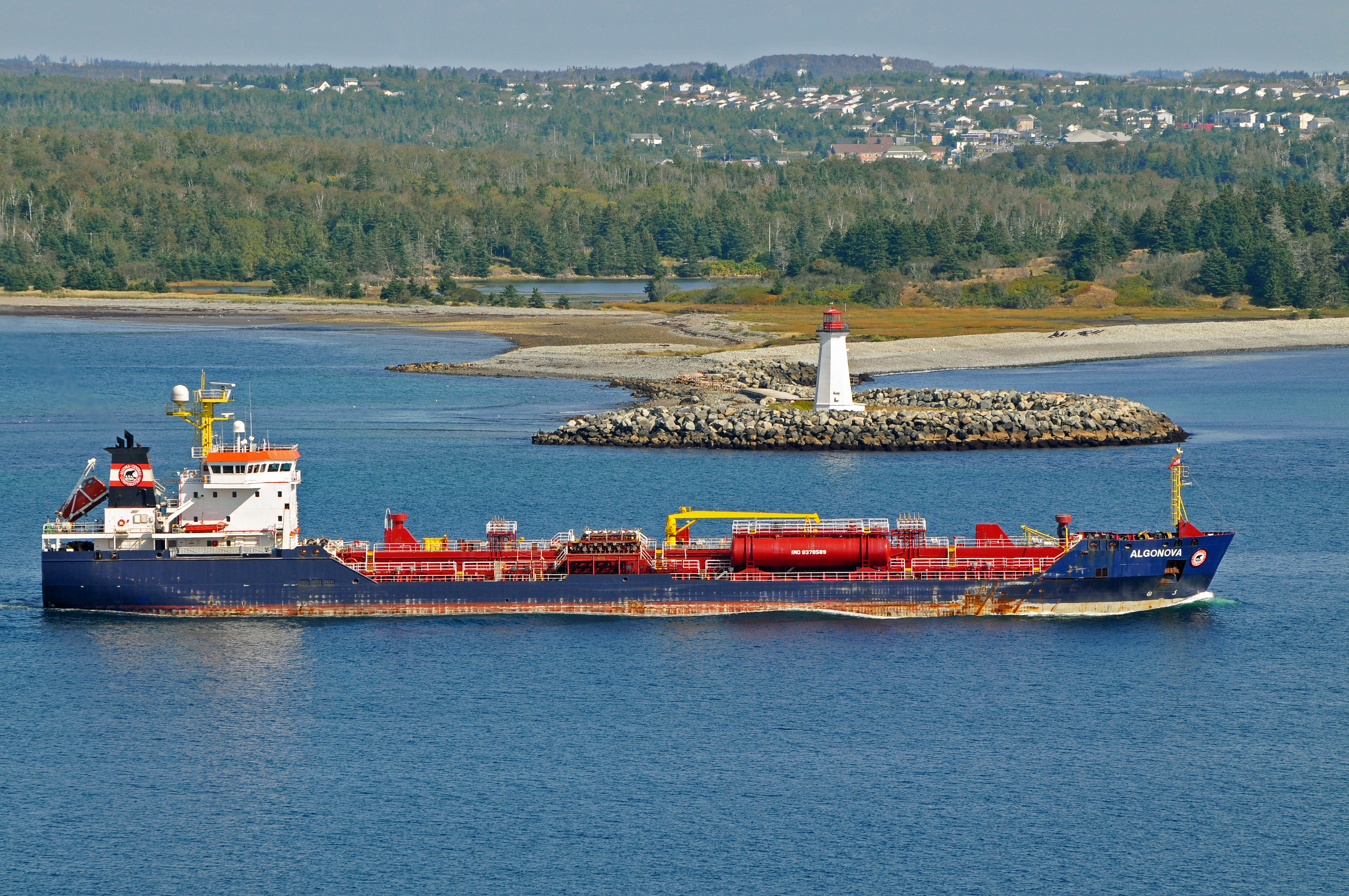
- Algonova off Halifax, Nova Scotia

History
- Name: Algonova
- Operator: Algoma Central
- Port of registry: (Canada) St. Catharines, Ontario
- Ordered: 2007
- Builder: Ereğli Shipyard
- Yard number: 4
- Laid down: 21 March 2006
- Launched: 17 April 2008
- Completed: 10 September 2008
- Identification: IMO number: 9378589
- Status: In active service

General characteristics
- Type: Double hulled tanker
- Tonnage: 8,009 GT; 11,856 DWT or 11,240 DWT
- Length: 129.9 m (426 ft 2 in) oa; 124.7 m (409 ft 1 in) pp
- Beam: 19.8 m (65 ft 0 in)
- Installed power: MaK 9M32C diesel engine, 6,118 bhp (4,562 kW)
- Propulsion: 1 shaft, bow thruster
- Speed: 14.5 knots (26.9 km/h; 16.7 mph)
- Capacity: 8,624 m^{3} (304,600 cu ft)

Algonova is double-hulled tanker built for Algoma Tankers Limited, a subsidiary of Algoma Central. The tanker's construction began in 2006 at Ereğli Shipyard in Turkey as Eregli 04. The ship was launched in 2008 as Algonova after the tanker was purchased by Algoma Tankers Limited while still under construction. The ship services ports on the Great Lakes and the Saint Lawrence Seaway. Algonova is the second ship to bear the name.

== Description ==
Algonova is a double-hulled tanker 129.9 m (426 ft 2 in) long overall and 124.7 m (409 ft 1 in) between perpendiculars with a beam of 19.8 m (65 ft 0 in). The ship has a gross tonnage (GT) of 8,009 and a deadweight tonnage (DWT) of 11,856 or 11,240 depending on the source. The ship is powered by a MaK 9M32C diesel engine rated at 6,118 brake horsepower (4,562 kW) driving one shaft with a controllable pitch propeller and a 500 kW (670 hp) bow thruster. The ship has a maximum speed of 14.5 knots (26.9 km/h; 16.7 mph). The vessel has a capacity for 8,624 m^{3} (304,600 cu ft). Algonova is classified by Lloyd's Register to Finnish-Swedish ice class 1A.

== Service history ==
The ship's keel was laid down on 21 March 2006 by Eregli Shipyard as Eregli 04 with the yard number 4. The tanker was purchased by Algoma Tankers Limited while still under construction in 2007 for CAN$43 million. The ship was acquired as part of Algoma Tankers Limited efforts to modernize its tanker fleet after regulations barred the use of single-hulled tankers on the Great Lakes and Saint Lawrence Seaway. Renamed Algonova, the vessel was launched on 17 April 2008. Delivery of the vessel was initially expected for February 2007. The ship was completed on 10 September 2008. Algonova services ports on the Great Lakes, Saint Lawrence Seaway and in Atlantic Canada. Algonova's ice class allows the vessel to deliver to ports on the Great Lakes during winter months.
