= Yugo & Lala =

- Poster
- Directed by: Wang Yunfei
- Music by: Sebastien Pan
- Release date: 10 August 2012
- Running time: 87 minutes
- Country: China
- Language: Mandarin
- Box office: ¥24 million (China)

Yugo & Lala (Chinese: 神秘世界历险记, lit. "A mysterious world adventures") is a 2012 Chinese computer animated film directed by Wang Yunfei. It was followed by the 2014 film Yugo & Lala 2.

== Synopsis ==
Precocious ten-year-old Yugo, a village girl who is also a student of martial arts, meets a white "liger", a half lion, half tiger creature born from a magic stone. It introduces itself as Lala. Shocked that she can understand the animal's language, Yugo chases it up a mountain where a waiting Cloud Whale swallows them both whole. Inside its giant stomach, there are many different creatures all excitedly being transported to Animal Paradise, a fantastical kingdom that welcomes only 99 chosen ones every ten years. However, human beings are forbidden in the kingdom, any that remain for more than three days will be transformed into an animal forever. To return home, Yugo seeks the help of the seemingly ferocious Uncle Bear, a black bear with a sharp tongue but a gentle heart. As time is running out for Yugo, she and Lala uncover Tiger General's devious plot to open a magical portal into Lala's world and turn every human into an animal. As Yugo's neighbours are transformed into animals one-by-one, she desperately seeks a way to destroy the gateway between the two worlds... only to discover that her new friend Lala is the magical portal.

== Cast ==
- Lu Liu
- Meng Quanlin
- Lu Kui
- Feng Sheng
- Jiang Guangtao
- Zhang Yaohan
- Li Lihong

English voice cast

- Maile Flanagan as Lala
- Abraham Benrubi as Mr. Bear
- J.K. Simmons as General Tiger
- Cristina Pucelli as Additional Voices
- Tom Arnold as Additional Voices
- Mira Sorvino
- George Takei
