= MV Damia Desgagnés =

Asphalt-bitumen-chemical tanker

History
- Name: Damia Desgagnés
- Owner: Groupe Desgagnés
- Operator: Groupe Desgagnés
- Port of registry: Quebec City, (Canada)
- Builder: Beşiktaş Shipyard, Yalova, Turkey
- Yard number: 60
- Completed: March 2017
- Identification: IMO number: 9766437; Call sign: CFAV; MMSI number: 316031773
- Status: In service

General characteristics
- Type: Tanker
- Tonnage: 11,978 GT; 15,100 DWT
- Length: 135.0 m (442.9 ft) oa; 132.6 m (435.0 ft) pp
- Beam: 23.5 m (77.1 ft)
- Depth: 11.3 m (37.1 ft)
- Propulsion: 1 × Wärtsilä 5RT-flex 50DF; 5,450 kW (7,310 hp); 1 × Controllable pitch propeller, bow thruster, stern thruster
- Speed: 14 knots (26 km/h; 16 mph)
- Capacity: 15,280 m^{3} (539,608 cu ft)

MV Damia Desgagnés is an asphalt-bitumen-chemical tanker owned and operated by Groupe Desgagnés for service on the Saint Lawrence Seaway. The ship was completed in March 2017. Damia Desgagnés is the first Canadian-flagged tanker to have a duel-fuel-powered propulsion system. The first of four ships of such a design, Damia Desgagnés ran aground on its first trip through the Saint Lawrence Seaway.

== Description ==
Damia Desgagnés is the first of four tankers designed specifically for Groupe Desgagnés to carry asphalt, bitumen and chemicals through the Saint Lawrence Seaway. The ship measures 135.0 m (442.9 ft) long overall and 132.6 m (435.0 ft) between perpendiculars, with a beam of 23.5 m (77.1 ft) and a depth of 11.3 m (37.1 ft). The ship has a 11,978 gross tonnage (GT) and 15,100 tons deadweight (DWT).

The ship is powered by a Wärtsilä 5RT-flex 50DF engine which can be powered by any of three types of fuel; heavy fuel oil, marine diesel oil or liquefied natural gas, marking Damia Desgagnés as the first Canadian-registered vessel to use this type of engine. The engine is rated at 5,450 kW (7,310 hp) and drives one controllable pitch propeller, a bow thruster, and a stern thruster. The ship is also equipped with three auxiliary generators and one emergency generator. The ship has a maximum speed of 14 knots (26 km/h; 16 mph). The ship's hull is of double hull design. The vessel has a capacity of 15,280 m^{3} (540,000 cu ft) and has twelve cargo tanks and two slop tanks and four cargo manifolds that produce a discharge rate of 1,600 m^{3} (57,000 cu ft) per hour.

== Service history ==
Damia Desgagnés was constructed at Beşiktaş Shipyard in Yalova, Turkey with the yard number 60. The ship was completed in March 2017 and accepted for delivery by the company on 30 March. The ship was named for Damien Beaulieu, the younger brother of the chairman of the board of Groupe Desgagnés, Louis-Marie Beaulieu. The vessel departed Turkey in April, taking on its first cargo in Europe before arriving in Canada in May. On its first journey up the Saint Lawrence Seaway, departing Montreal for Nanticoke, Ontario with a load of heavy fuel, the ship ran aground on 16 June, 3 nautical miles (5.6 km; 3.5 mi) east of Iroquois, Ontario. The ship's engines failed and Damia Desgagnés lost power and drifted on the river until the bow lodged in sand. No structural damage to the ship was recorded and no oil was spilled. However, all traffic on the Saint Lawrence Seaway was stopped as result of the grounding.
