= High Arctic Haulers =

2020 Canadian documentary television series

- Genre: Reality television
- Narrated by: Mark A. Miller
- Country of origin: Canada
- Original languages: English; Inuktitut; French
- No. of seasons: 1
- No. of episodes: 7

Production
- Executive producers: Ivan Fecan; Anthony Lacques; Mark A. Miller; Blair Reekie; David Way
- Producers: Jeffrey Kinnon; Kelly McClughan; Tim Hardy; P.J. Naworynski
- Production company: Great Pacific Media

Original release
- Network: CBC
- Release: January 5 – March 1, 2020

High Arctic Haulers is a reality television series that follows the annual sealift by Groupe Desgagnés that supplies the isolated communities in Canada's Arctic Archipelago. The first episode of the first season was broadcast on the CBC on January 5, 2020. The series was produced by Great Pacific Media.

== Background ==
Almost none of Canada's Northern communities have any port facilities, a fact the series portrays dramatically as it shows the extra difficulties the ships face unloading cargo: (1) unloading and launching a tugboat and barge, they carry as deck cargo; (2) using the tug and barge to carry front end loaders to the community's beach, where they will then unload pallets of cargo from subsequent barge loads. Series creator Kelvin Redvers told Nunavut News that the show was a "documentary series", not a reality-TV show, distinguishing his series from Reality-TV because "It truly is documentary. We’re simply following the story, following the lives, and we’re not embellishing or we’re not putting our own perspectives on what’s happening to try to change the narrative.” Redvers is from Hay River, Northwest Territories, sometimes called "The Hub of the North", where cargo from the south arrives, by rail, and is then loaded on barges for shipment down the Mackenzie River system, and then to sites in the Beaufort Sea and western Arctic. He described first pitching the show in 2014. Redvers said he had long been frustrated by film-makers from the South, whose films got key details all wrong. He said he was proud of portions of the show that profiled young people of First Nations background, playing a leadership role.

One of the items being shipped that episode one followed was school-teacher Vicki Tanuyak's shiny new red pickup truck. Tanuyak described how there were no garages, or dealerships, in her hometown of Chesterfield Inlet, Nunavut. She had saved for a replacement while her previous vehicle was failing on her, and purchased a new vehicle at a dealership, on a rare visit to the south. Her vehicle had to be shipped to Montreal by May to be delivered in July. Viewers saw how Tanuyak was able to monitor her truck's location online, while awaiting delivery.

== Episodes ==
No.	Title	Original release date	Canada viewers (millions)
1	"Chasing Ice"	January 5, 2020	N/A
2	"Patience is the Arctic"	January 12, 2020	N/A
3	"Not Everyone is a Sailor"	January 19, 2020	N/A
4	"High Arctic Homecoming"	January 26, 2020	N/A
5	"Wet Below Deck"	February 16, 2020	N/A
6	"To Thrive Up Here"	February 23, 2020	N/A
7	"The Arctic Cup"	March 1, 2020	N/A

== Reception ==
In its review of the first episode Jim Bell of Nunatsiaq News praised the episode, predicting Northerners would "fall in love" with its "rare inside look at one of the eastern Arctic’s most life-essential services". His review noted the producers had applied a formula that worked well for other successful shows, like Ice Pilots NWT or Ice Road Truckers, or Great Pacific's own Heavy Rescue: 401 and Highway Through Hell - "Rugged teams of blue-collar heroes, mostly male, struggl[ing] against bad weather, bad luck and other hardships."
