= Chuck Chicken =

2015 Malaysian animated TV series

- Logo for the series
- Genre: Action; Adventure; Comedy; Superhero; Magical boy
- Created by: Edmund Chan; Raye Lee
- Written by: Joseph Viciana
- Directed by: Ah Loong; Chua Chong Tee
- Theme music composer: Cole Rintoul (writer/singer), Siew and Sam Melamed
- Opening theme: "Chuck Chicken"
- Composer: Sébastien Pan
- Country of origin: Malaysia
- Original languages: English; Malay; Chinese
- No. of seasons: 1
- No. of episodes: 52

Production
- Executive producers: Edmund Chan; Raye Lee; Helen Dong
- Running time: 10–11 mins
- Production company: Animasia Studio

Original release
- Network: TV9; TV3
- Release: August 24, 2015

Related
- Chuck Chicken Power Up; Harry & Bunnie

Chuck Chicken (Kung Fu Chicken in China) is a Malaysian animated television series created by Edmund Chan and Raye Lee and produced by Animasia Studio. The series takes place on a bird-filled island of Rocky Perch, and it revolves around a chicken named Chuck. He turns into the eponymous "Kung Fu Chicken" with a golden egg, providing kung fu–style security and protection to the citizens of the island. When Chuck uses the golden egg with animal powers, he tries to defeat his enemies while protecting his egg-shaped planet; it looks like planet Earth, but with anthropomorphic birds instead of humans.

== Overview ==
The show has 52 episodes and is in Cantonese, English, Malay, Vietnamese, Mandarin, Indonesian, and Thai. Eleven years after its debut, the show was dubbed into Korean for the first time and aired on JEI TV. Originally, 52 episodes were released in 2010, with 11 minutes each for Season 1. It was made possible by the funding provided by the Malaysian Government under the Ministry of Communication and Multimedia, and it took Animasia Studio approximately 18 months for production by 100 Malaysian creative talents. On November 26, 2017, Netflix had picked up the show and played it worldwide. However, the show was removed from the streaming service in the United States on November 15, 2020, and worldwide on January 10, 2021. Since 2023, all episodes are available to watch on Dailymotion. Most can be found on the Chuck Chicken YouTube channel.

The show had received many positive reviews worldwide, but some critics have heavily criticized it for being a direct ripoff and plagiarism of Rovio's Angry Birds.

== Plot ==
The series takes place at Rocky Perch, which is home to a lot of birds of different forms. The Golden Egg Securities, the island's high-rank service, is run by Chuck Chicken and his teammates Flick and Wing. They provide kung-fu-styled security to the citizens and their valuables by battling against villains like the Cyber Ducks, Dr. Mingo, Pen and Guin, and the Sinister Emperor to keep their town at peace.

== Main characters ==
=== Heroes ===
- Chuck Adoodledoo — Chuck Adoodledoo (or simply Chuck) is a chicken who inherited Golden Egg Securities from the vanished master via mysterious circumstances. He has made it his mission to find him again. He was the clumsiest chicken on Rocky Perch Island until he received the Golden Egg, an object that bestows the wearer with amazing Kung Fu abilities. It also transforms the wearer into 12 animal-themed forms. In the guise of his alter ego, Kung Fu Chicken, he protects the inhabitants of Rocky Perch from Dr. Mingo and the many other villains that lurk around the island. In his role as Kung Fu Chicken, Chuck has many amazing abilities, but still relies on his best friends, Flick and Wing, to get him out of trouble when things go wrong. Since they go wrong frequently, they are kept very busy indeed.
- Flick Feathers — Flick Feathers (or simply Flick) is a beautiful, feisty white dove with attitude. She is the real “brain” of the team and the bird that is most likely to find a solution. Flick treats her work very seriously, and she likes to be diligent in everything she does. She is a Kung Fu expert with incredible speed and acrobatic abilities that she often uses to get her friends out of trouble. Flick is also an expert with her throwing ring, a device she can hurl with pinpoint accuracy.
- Wing Span — Wing Span (or simply Wing) is an outgoing, friendly hornbill, and the dreamer of the group. He is also an enthusiastic, amateur inventor, who is forever building strange devices that never actually work in the way he originally intended. Although Wing is a little disorganized, it doesn't stop him from creating even more hare-brained contraptions to aid him and his friends in security work. He is the shortest member of the team, and like his friends, he is a kung fu expert. Wing uses his gadget-packed wooden staff to make up for his lack of height and maneuverability.

=== Villains ===
- Dee, Don, and Dex — Dee, Don and Dex are a family of ducks that have been cyber-enhanced with robotic technology, making each duck super strong and fast. Don is known to be very smart, while Dex is stronger but dumber. Dee is one of Chuck's archenemies, and he has been searching the Magic Egg for years. His younger brothers Don and Dex are on a mission to be the richest birds on Rocky Perch Island. However, to do this, they must successfully steal valuables from under the noses of Golden Egg Securities. They first appeared in 'The Magic Egg'. In the episodes "Laughing Gas" and "Dexenstein", they team up with Dr. Mingo and his employees Pen and Guin.
- Dr. Mingo — Dr. Mingo is another one of Chuck's archenemies and a criminal mastermind when it comes to technology. He is a short-tempered megalomaniac on a quest to rule the island of Rocky Perch, and he uses his creations to perform spectacular robberies. Earlier in his life, he turned his back on his peace loving flamingo family to pursue a life of crime. Despite his appearance, he doesn't like the color pink; he hates any jokes or reference to his pink feathers. Dr. Mingo inhabits a secret laboratory in the center of the island's dormant volcano with his two penguin sidekicks Pen and Guin. Since Golden Egg Securities have started foiling his crimes, Dr. Mingo has become obsessed with finally capturing Chuck and his friends. In many episodes, he has tried to kiss Flick, but he does not get the result he expects.
- Pen and Guin — Pen and Guin are a pair of mischievous penguin twins that work for Dr. Mingo. The twins come from Antarctica, but since they miss the cold so much, they have to wear specially constructed suits that cool them at all times. They also wield Ray Guns that freeze their opponents into solid blocks of ice.
- Sinister Emperor — A sinister vulture entity who first appeared in the episode The Road of Danger. When Chuck banished him, he got his new power which was the Black Egg, which was formerly a hundred times more powerful than that of Chuck's egg before the latter was upgraded. Sinister was defeated by Chuck in the episode Return of the Sinister Emperor because Chuck's golden egg's powers were upgraded to a thousand times as powerful than the original form.

== Powers ==
Chuck is able to use twelve animal super powers while using the magic egg:

- Rhino Punch — Gives Chuck super-strength, making him more than twice as durable.
- Speeding Cheetah — Gives Chuck the ability to run at super-speed and also gives him super-human reflexes.
- Minuscule Mouse — Shrinks Chuck into a tiny form which allows him to enter and travel through tiny holes or through secret areas.
- Spider Feet — Gives Chuck the ability to stick and climb to or up walls and shoot webbing from his wrists.
- Rubber Snake — Gives Chuck rubber-like powers, so that he can bend, squash, stretch and shape-shift into all sorts of different forms.
- Spinning Mole — Enables Chuck to spin rapidly, tunneling underground.
- Armadillo Shield — Transforms Chuck's feathers into indestructible shield-like armor. This power also lets him curl into a ball to roll out and strike enemies.
- Eagle Eyes — Gives Chuck telescopic vision and gains wings to soar in the sky.
- Leaping Toadfish — This power gives Chuck fish scales, webbed feet, and the ability to breathe underwater.
- Sonic Bat — Chuck can grow huge super-sensitive bat ears that can make him hear very well.
- Invisible Chameleon — Helps Chuck turn invisible to follow enemies or help sneak around enemy areas.
- Smoky Skunk — Chuck emits a toxic smog that gives him the chance to escape from unwanted or dangerous battles, to subdue enemies quickly, or to kill out easy-to-kill foes.

On the other hand, Sinister Emperor is able to use super powers while using a black egg in a similar manner to Chuck:

- Power of the Thundercloud/Lightning - Sinister turns into a thundercloud unleashing various bolts of lightning.
- Power of the Tornado/Hurricane - Gives Sinister the power of the tornado or a hurricane.
- Power of the Meteoroid - Combines various rocks to turn Sinister a large meteor.

== Episodes ==
- The Magic Egg
- The Lucky Stone
- The Mysterious Stone
- Road to Danger
- Scrambled Egg
- The Robozilla
- Zombie Invasion
- The Alien
- The Attack of the Machines
- Combat in Death Valley
- The Double
- The Menace from Space
- Plant Panic
- The Incredible Shrinking Chicken
- The Box of Calamities
- Televised Revenge
- The Return of the Sinister Emperor
- The Baby That Came From Outer Space
- Magnetic Dex
- The Magic Bottle
- The Video Game
- The Plague of Insects
- The Nightmare
- The Weather Machine
- The Return of the Zombies
- Laughing Gas
- Crazy for Cookies
- Rotten Robert
- Hypnotic Telephones
- A Comic Book Superhero
- The Cuddly Toy from Hell
- The Night the World Ended
- Dexenstein
- The Mind Thief
- The Lovely Death
- Chuck vs. Oxidus
- Chuck's Apprentice
- A Mysterious Robbery
- The Batvampire
- The Last Warrior
- The Flying Dutchraven
- Gateway to Hell
- The Army of Shadows
- The Lost Heiress
- The Mega Diamond
- The Glaciator
- Wing's First Love
- Mystery at the School
- Jinx Power
- The Ogre from the Volcano
- The Mercenaries
- Mingo Romeo

== Collaboration ==
Animasia Studio has also collaborated with Sasbadi Holdings Berhad to produce Chuck Chicken books and games for sale and distribution worldwide. In addition, the coloring Books and comic Books based on the show have AR technology embedded inside.

== Current broadcasters ==
Country	Networks	Official Languages
Malaysia	TV3; TV9; Astro Ceria; TV2	Malay; English
Indonesia	RTV; GTV	Indonesia; English
Singapore	Suria	Malay; English
Southeast Asia	Disney Channel Asia; Disney XD Asia	Asian English
Hong Kong	TVB USA	Cantonese
India	Hungama TV	Indian English; Hindi; Tamil; Telugu
Iran	Pouya Channel	Persian
MENA	MBC 3	Standard Arabic
Israel	Junior Channel	Hebrew
Portugal	SIC K	Portuguese
China	IQiyi; CETV-1 Channel; Shenzhen Media Group; Kids Channel; Zhejiang Television Kids Channel; Dalian Television	Mandarin Chinese
Canada	Toon-A-Vision; Cartoon Network(formerly)	Canadian English
