= Smoke (TV series) =

- Promotional poster
- Genre: Crime drama
- Created by: Dennis Lehane
- Inspired by: Firebug by Truth Podcasting Corp.
- Starring: Taron Egerton; Jurnee Smollett; Rafe Spall; Ntare Guma Mbaho Mwine; Hannah Emily Anderson; Greg Kinnear; John Leguizamo
- Music by: Danny Bensi & Saunder Jurriaans
- Opening theme: "Dialing In" by Thom Yorke
- Countries of origin: Canada; United States
- Original language: English
- No. of seasons: 1
- No. of episodes: 9

Production
- Executive producers: Dennis Lehane; Joe Chappelle; Jane Bartelme; Kari Skogland; Marc Smerling; Taron Egerton; Kary Antholis; Bradley Thomas; Dan Friedkin; Richard Plepler
- Producers: Molly Miller; David Diliberto
- Cinematography: Sam McCurdy; François Dagenais; Todd McMullen
- Editors: Plummy Tucker; Rob Bonz; John Petaja; Michael Costello
- Running time: 42–65 minutes
- Production companies: Truth Media; Crime Story; Imperative Entertainment; EDEN Productions; Hans Bubby; Apple Studios

Original release
- Network: Apple TV+
- Release: June 27 – August 15, 2025

Smoke is an American crime drama television series created by Dennis Lehane, inspired by Firebug, a podcast about the crimes of arsonist John Leonard Orr. It premiered on Apple TV+ on June 27, 2025.

== Premise ==
A detective and an arson investigator work together to stop two serial arsonists in the Pacific Northwest.

== Cast ==
=== Main ===
- Taron Egerton as David "Dave" Gudsen, an arson investigator and former firefighter with the Umberland Fire Department
- Jurnee Smollett as Detective Michelle Calderone, a Columbia Metro Police Department detective assigned to assist Dave investigating the arsons in Umberland
- Rafe Spall as Captain Steven Burke, Michelle's married superior who she has an affair with
- Ntare Guma Mbaho Mwine as Freddy Fasano, a worker at Coop's Fried Chicken in the Trolley Town neighborhood who is a suspected arsonist
- Hannah Emily Anderson as Ashley Gudsen, a librarian and Dave's third wife
- Greg Kinnear as Commander Harvey Englehart, the chief of the Umberland Fire Department
- John Leguizamo as Ezra Esposito, a sufferer of alcohol addiction and former Columbia Metro Police Department detective who used to work with Dave

=== Recurring ===
- Luke Roessler as Emmett, Ashley's teenage son and Dave's stepson
- Dakota Daulby as Lee, Freddy's colleague at Coop's Fried Chicken
- Adina Porter as Brenda Cephus, a hairdresser and friend of Freddy
- Mishka Thébaud as Benji, Michelle's brother
- Erin Karpluk as Reba Daniels, an insurance adjuster and Gudsen's ex-wife
- Anna Chlumsky as Special Agent Dawn Hudson, an ATF agent assisting with the arson investigations

=== Guest ===
- David James Lewis as Archibald "Archie" Stanton, an Umberland firefighter and suspected arsonist
- Nozipho Mclean as Rose, Benji's wife and Michelle's sister-in-law

== Episodes ==
No.	Title	Directed by	Written by	Original release date
1	"Pilot"	Kari Skogland	Dennis Lehane	June 27, 2025 (Note: This episode was first shown at the 2025 Tribeca Festival on June 12, 2025.)
Dave Gudsen is an arson investigator, he lives with his wife Ashley and stepson Emmet. He is given a detective, Michelle Calderone, as a partner to help him solve a string of fires. Two different arsonist's, one for more than a year and the other 6 months. Michelle was moved to arson investigation after an affair with Captain, Steve Burke, ended sourly. Michelle and Dave began to go over the past fires. One arsonist uses a "slow burn" method and usually tragets stores or commercial buldings. The second arsonist on starts fires in Trolly Town and always at night, using a mik jug full of gasoline left under his victims porches.
2	"Your Happy Makes Me Sad"	Joe Chappelle	Dennis Lehane & Adriane McCray	June 27, 2025
Michelle realizes the first arsonist is faking his limp, when the rewatch footage from the lates D & C arsonist fire. Dave manages to get a sketch of a possible suspect from the Trolly Town fires, made by the second arsonist. Dave begins to work on a book. A book semi based on his own experinces as a arson investigator. We see Freddy, an older man working in the kitchen of Coops, a fast food chicken restaurant. He is becoming incresingly fed up with his job. Michelle and Dave follow a firefighter, Arch, they suspect to be the D & C arsonist. They follow him to some sort of trailer and then leave. Michelle goes back later on her own, where she finds a bunker which includes a BDSM dungeon underneath the trailer. Arch catches her and she shoots him in both thighs and calls for back up.
3	"Weird Milk"	Joe Chappelle	Molly Miller	July 4, 2025
Michelle gets cleared by HR to go back into the field, she is dubed a hero for her actions against Arch. Michelle starts to consider that Dave may be the D & C arsonist, while Dave continues on his book. Dave and Michelle realize the second arsonist always wraps black plastic bags aroun his milk jugs, the two conclude that only two stores near Trolly Town use black plastic bags. Michelle continues to have flashbacks of a fire she had been in as a young girl. Freddy applies for manager at his job and after bombing his first interview, does not get a second interview and he is heartbroken.
4	"Strawberry"	Joe Chappelle	Molly Miller and Kary Antholis	July 11, 2025
Dave teaches a fire sftey training to rookie firefighters. Dave tells Michelle his mom disappred one day when he was 15, only to be found two weeks later, leaving of her own will to start a new life, abandoning Dave. Dave's nice guy exterior is starting to crack when he gets in to an argument with his stepson, Emmet. Dave meets a women at the grocery store and the two go back to her place to have a BDSM encounter when Dave shows her what "streaking" means. He lights her stomach on fire for a second and then puts the fire out, the women at first, upset by this, but then becomes intrigued and becomes a willing partner, in "streaking".
5	"Size Matters"	Jim McKay	Steven Hanna and Steve Harris	July 18, 2025
Dave is out of town at a fire inspector convention. It is shown he seems to regularly cheat on his wife, Ashley. Michelle, who has been digging more into Dave, follows an ex partner of his, Ezra. Ezra was let go with full pension and benefits after "accidentally" shooting himself in the left foot. Ezra realizes that Michelle is tailing him and he approaches her. He express his deep hate for Dave and tells Michelle he belives that Dave is starting these fires.Ezra shows Michelle a video from when he and Dave were partners of Dave, lighting an abandoned trailer on fire, only for Ezra to realize the trailer was full of living dogs. Freddy is making multiple milk jugs full of gasoline, he then goes to the HR person whom he had interviewed for, and lights his house on fire, with the man and his sleeping wife inside. Dave sees on the news that the second arsonist just killed to people in a well off part of town and seems to be jelous by the attention the second arsonist is getting. Driving home, Dave is hit by a drunk driver.
6	"Manhood"	Jim McKay	Dennis Lehane	July 25, 2025
Dave is fine after his wreck but is still in the hospital. Ashley his wife visits him and tells him she wants a divorce. Dave is discharged and continues to spiral. Ezra and Michelle let Chief Harvey know, they believe Dave is the D and C arsonist. Captain Burke calls in this information about Dave to the ATF. Freddy does not show up for work on his scheduled shift, his co worker meets up with him at an abandoned board walk where Freddy takes his keys. Michelle is looking more into Freddy as the suspect as arsonist number 2, when she discovers he burnt down his last foster home when he was 19, killing the 6 people inside. Dave breaks in to Freddy's apartment and sees all the milk jugs full of gasoline. Michelle's brother visits her to let her know, their mother is being released from prison. Dave catches Freddy and brings him in.
7	"Whitewashed Tombs"	Joe Chappelle	Teleplay by : Dennis Lehane & Molly Miller; Story by : Steven Hanna & Adriane McCray	August 1, 2025
Michelle struggles with the news her mother is being released. Dave is dubbed a hero for catching Freddy, who was responsible for all the Trolly Town fires. Dave is a guest on a popular morning show for his heroic efforts and catching Freddy. Dave is hoping this will lead to a publisher wanting to publish Daves novel. Freddy will not speak to anyone, only asking the other officers, who Dave is. Dave goes to talk to Freddy, Freddy lets it be known, he knows Dave is the other arsonist, the D and C arsonist. Michelle speaks to Ashley at the gym and lets her know they suspect Dave for all the D and C arsons. Michelle visits Reba, Dave's second wife. Reba alerts Dave that Michelle is looking in to him. Dave later goes to the bar were other firefighters and cops are celebrating him, when Captain Burke sucker punches Dave for Dave talking about Michelle negativly. Harvey tells Michelle that he knows Dave is now aware they're investigating him. Freddy hangs himself at the police station, in his cell.
8	"Mercy"	Jim McKay	Molly Miller	August 8, 2025
Dave is making many of his slow burning fire starters, sitting 6 more fires overnight. Dave arrives back to work like nothing happened and claims he wants to solve the latest 6 fires from the night before. During lunch, Dave brings up the fire that Michelle's mother started when she was 12. Her mom had been escorting out of a hotel room, having her daughter wait in the closet while she did . Dave then calls Michelle, Mercy. Dave continues to taunt Michelle. Later that night Dave goes to see Reba, who tells him he has no self-awareness and saying that Dave always needed to be "the hero". He admits to Reba he is the D and C arsonist. Michelle and Captain Burke get into an argument, when she throat punches him after he grabs her, only for him to fall to the ground and die. She decides to set the house on fire, so she can blame the murder on Dave.
9	"Mirror, Mirror"	Joe Chappelle	Dennis Lehane	August 15, 2025
The team are all informed of Burke's murder. They all suspect Dave of the murder and fire. Dave comes in to work, again, as if nothing has happened. Dave and Michelle drive out to a major brush fire that is only 30% contained. They wreck on the way, and then Michelle shoves her gun in Daves mouth, thinking if she should kill him or bring him in. She ends up bringing him in and during the interrogation, he taunts her more and says he knows she is responsible for the death of Burke. During this time it is show to the audience, that Dave looks completely different. He is not the skinny, fit, chiseled version we have been seeing of him, in reality he is balding, pudgy and unkept. Showing that Dave had been under the illusion he was the character he had been writing in his book. The show ends with Michelle and Dave staring at each other from oppisite sides of the interrogation table.

== Production ==
=== Development ===
It was announced in December 2022 that Dennis Lehane and Taron Egerton, who had worked together on Apple TV+'s miniseries Black Bird, would reteam for Firebug, a new television series at Apple TV+, inspired by the crimes of arsonist John Leonard Orr. In addition to starring, Egerton serves as executive producer alongside Richard Plepler through Eden Productions, Dan Friedkin and Bradley Thomas through Imperative Entertainment, Joe Chappelle, Marc Smerling for Truth Podcasting Corp, Jane Bartelme and Kary Antholis for Crime Story Media, LLC.

=== Casting ===
In March 2024, Jurnee Smollett and John Leguizamo joined the cast, with Kari Skogland set to direct and executive produce the series. Chappelle and Jim McKay also directed the episodes. Rafe Spall, Greg Kinnear, Ntare Mwine and Hannah Emily Anderson would be added to the cast in May.

=== Filming ===
Filming began in Vancouver in March 2024.

== Release ==
The first two episodes of the series were shown at the 2025 Tribeca Festival on June 12, 2025. The series was retitled from Firebug to Smoke, and it premiered on June 27, 2025.

== Reception ==
The review aggregator website Rotten Tomatoes reported a 73% approval rating based on 56 critic reviews. The website's critics consensus reads, "Smoke obscures its appeal with coy plotting until it eventually lights a fire under its story, but commanding turns from Taron Egerton and Jurnee Smollett keep this drama watchable throughout." Metacritic, which uses a weighted average, assigned a score of 60 out of 100 based on 19 critics, indicating "generally favorable".
