= Sedna Desgagnés =

Cargo ship

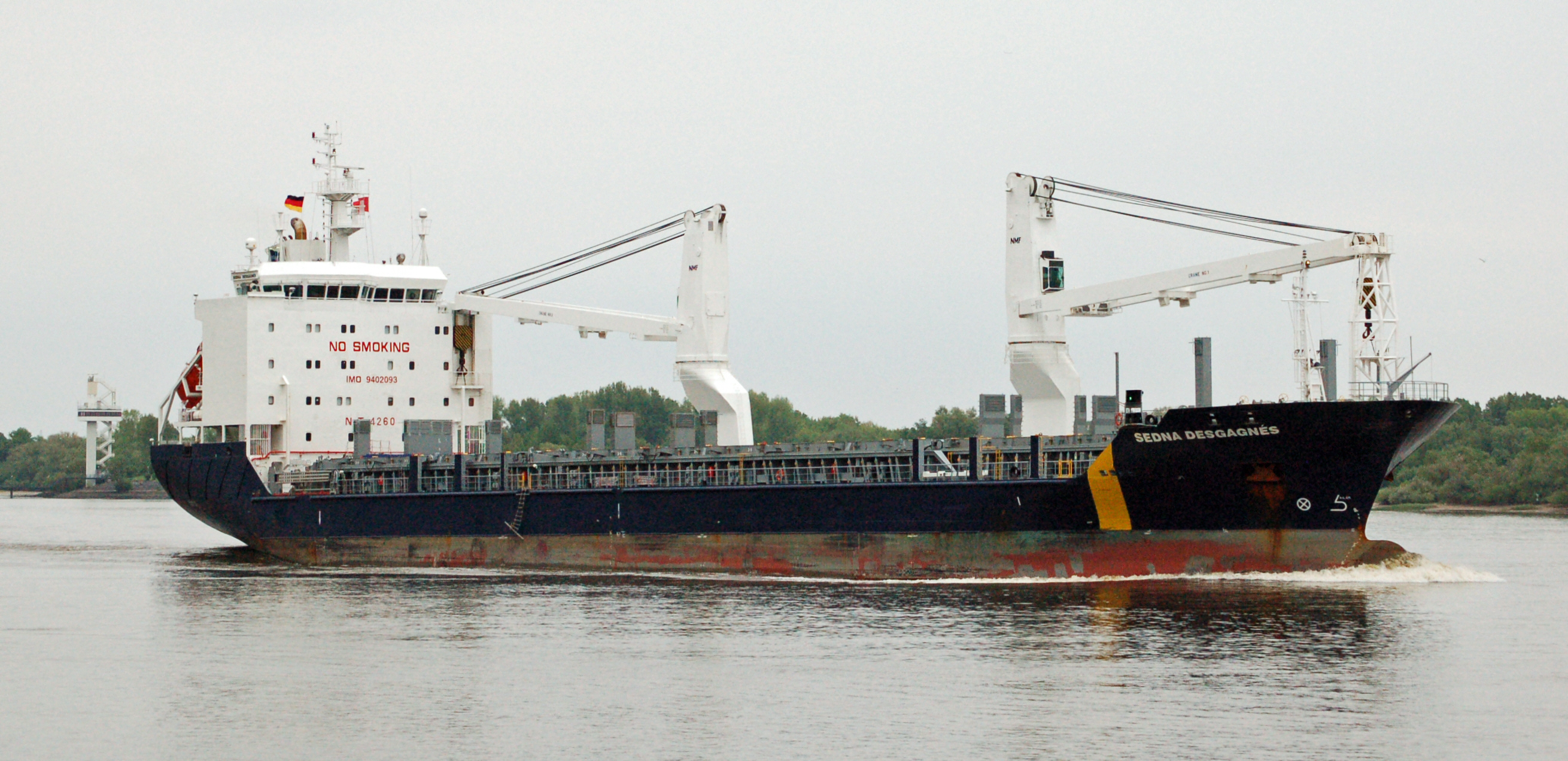
- Sedna Desgagnés

History
- Name: Beluga Festivity; Sedna Desgagnés
- Operator: Groupe Desgagnés
- Port of registry: (Canada) Quebec City
- Builder: Qingshan, Wuhan
- Yard number: 20060304
- Laid down: 16 November 2007
- Launched: 12 May 2008
- Completed: 23 February 2009
- In service: 2009
- Identification: IMO number: 9402093; Call sign: CYQE; MMSI number: 314296000
- Status: In service

General characteristics
- Type: Beluga E/F cargo ship
- Tonnage: 9,611 GT; 12,612 DWT
- Length: 139 m (456 ft 0 in) oa; 130.7 m (428 ft 10 in) pp
- Beam: 21 m (68 ft 11 in)
- Draught: 8 m (26 ft 3 in)
- Installed power: 1 × MAK Caterpillar 6M43C diesel engine, 5,400 kW (7,200 hp); 3 auxiliary engines/generators of 395 kW (530 hp) each
- Propulsion: 1 shaft; 1 bow thruster of 500 kW (670 hp)
- Speed: 15.5 knots (28.7 km/h; 17.8 mph)
- Capacity: 665 TEU; 15,953 m^{3} (563,400 cu ft)

Sedna Desgagnés is a Beluga E/F type cargo ship built in China from 2007 to 2009 and entered service with the Canadian shipping line Groupe Desgagnés in 2009. The television series High Arctic Haulers followed the vessel as she made the annual deliveries of supplies to a series of communities in Canada's Arctic Archipelago, during the short shipping season. The vessel also sails on the Great Lakes and St. Lawrence Seaway and is in service.

== Description ==
Designated a multi-purpose dry cargo ship by Groupe Desgagnés, Sedna Desgagnés is a Beluga E/F type vessel. The cargo ship is measured at 9,611 gross tonnage (GT) and 12,612 tons deadweight (DWT). Sedna Desgagnés is 139 m (456 ft 0 in) long overall, 130.7 m (428 ft 10 in) between perpendiculars with a beam of 21 m (68 ft 11 in) and a draught of 8 m (26 ft 3 in).

The ship is powered by a single MAK Caterpillar 6M43C diesel engine turning one shaft creating 5,400 kW (7,200 hp). The vessel is equipped with three auxiliary engines/generators of 395 kW (530 hp) each and one bow thruster of 500 kW (670 hp). Sedna Desgagnés has a maximum speed of 15.5 knots (28.7 km/h; 17.8 mph) and has a consumption of 23 t (23 long tons; 25 short tons) of IFO 380 fuel per day.

Sedna Desgagnés has a monohull that is strengthened to carry shipping containers has capacity for 665 TEU and 15,953 m^{3} (563,400 cu ft) of dry goods. The vessel has three cargo holds and two cranes each capable of lifting 180 t (180 long tons; 200 short tons) but can be twinned for a total lifting capability of 360 t (350 long tons; 400 short tons). The vessel is rated as DNV-GL - 100A5 E3, equivalent to Lloyd's 100A1 Ice Class 1A.

== Construction and career ==
The ship's keel was laid down on 16 November 2007 at Qingshan Shipyard in Wuhan, China with the yard number 20060304. The vessel was launched on 12 May 2008 and completed on 23 February 2009. When completed the vessel was named Beluga Festivity. That year, the vessel was renamed Sedna Desgagnés, registered in Quebec City, Quebec, Canada with the IMO number 9402093, call sign CYQE and MMSI number 314296000. (Note: Equasis has the vessel registered in Barbados with the call sign 8PVW.) The ship entered service in 2009.

Sedna Desgagnés ran aground in the St. Lawrence Seaway, near Prescott, Ontario, on 14 October 2012. Carrying a cargo of pig iron, the cargo had to be shifted to a lighter before the vessel could be freed by two tugs on 20 October.

The television series High Arctic Haulers followed the vessel as she made the annual deliveries of supplies to a series of communities in Canada's Arctic Archipelago, during the short shipping season.

In June 2021, Sedna Desgagnés performed the first voyage of a new container feeder service between the ports of Montreal, Quebec and Hamilton, Ontario.
