= Cold Road =

2024 Canadian thriller film

- Directed by: Kelvin Redvers
- Written by: Kelvin Redvers
- Produced by: Kelvin Redvers; Matt Watterworth; Gianna Isabella Magliocco
- Starring: Roseanne Supernault
- Cinematography: Daniel Everitt-Lock
- Edited by: Jerry Skibinsky
- Production companies: IndigiFilm; Iylond Entertainment
- Distributed by: Levelfilm
- Release date: January 15, 2024 (Rio Theatre)
- Running time: 100 minutes
- Country: Canada
- Language: English

Cold Road is a 2024 Canadian thriller film, directed by Kelvin Redvers. The film stars Roseanne Supernault as Tracy, an indigenous woman who is driving, accompanied solely by her dog Pretzel, to her home reserve in far northern Saskatchewan to see her dying mother, but who is under threat from a big rig truck driver who is following her.

The cast also includes Taylor Kinequon, Samuel Hoeksema, Kim Faires, Chad Cosgrave, Nora Mcadam, Cassandra Phillips-Grande, Carla Fox, C. Blake Evernden, Peter Redvers, William Louttit and Lisa Pantherbone.

== Distribution ==
A working print of the film, with an unfinished audio mix, was screened in Yellowknife and Redvers' hometown of Hay River, Northwest Territories, in 2023, and the completed film had its official premiere on January 15, 2024, at the Rio Theatre in Vancouver, British Columbia. It was acquired for distribution by Levelfilm.

It was screened in communities in the Canadian Arctic, including Hay River and Iqaluit, beginning January 26. It then had a one-week theatrical run in theatres in Alberta beginning February 9, and continued screening in Edmonton until February 21, before premiering nationally on streaming platforms in March.

== Critical response ==
Writing for Exclaim!, Courtney Small gave the film a mixed review, praising Supernault's performance but stating that "while Cold Road does an effective job of conveying the fear and isolation Tracy endures, especially when the truck is weaving back and forth on the road like a python about to strike, Redvers's script often struggles with the limiting nature of the film's setting. Since much of the film consists of Tracy and Pretzel in the car, the film often explains more than it shows, creating copious amounts of exposition that's more of a curse than a gift."

== Awards ==
Brent Planiden and Chris Ferguson received a Canadian Screen Award nomination for Best Sound Mixing at the 12th Canadian Screen Awards.
