= Kwai Boo =

- Poster
- 桂宝之爆笑闯宇宙
- Directed by: Yunfei Wang
- Music by: Sébastien Pan
- Distributed by: Beijing Juhe Yinglian Media; Beijing Motianlun Media
- Release date: 6 August 2015
- Running time: 95 minutes
- Country: China
- Language: Mandarin
- Box office: CN¥64.2 million

Kwai Boo (Chinese: 桂宝之爆笑闯宇宙) is a 2015 Chinese animated science fiction comedy film directed by Yunfei Wang. The film was released on 6 August 2015.

== Voice cast ==
- Yunfei Wang
- Ah-Gui
- Tianxiang Yang
- Shan Xin
- Xiaoxi Tang
- Guannan He
- Tute Hameng
- A Jie
- Bao Mu Zhong Yang
- Xiaoyu Liu

== Reception ==
The film earned CN¥64.174 million at the Chinese box office.
