= Yugo & Lala 2 =

- Directed by: Wang Yunfei
- Music by: Sebastien Pan
- Release date: 8 August 2014
- Running time: 80 minutes
- Country: China
- Language: Mandarin
- Box office: US$8,660,000

Yugo & Lala 2 (Chinese: 神秘世界历险记2) is a 2014 Chinese animated family adventure film directed by Wang Yunfei. It's a sequel of Yugo & Lala (2012) and was followed by 2016's Yugo & Lala 3.

== Synopsis ==
Yugo has been telling her father a bedtime story repeatedly that she was the only human visitor to a fantastical kingdom in the clouds where she befriended two animals, Lala and Uncle Bear. The three fought the evil Tiger General, who had risen up against the kingdom's ruler. It was the former ruler's dying wish that Lala would replace him. Missing her friends, Yugo finds her way back to the fantastical kingdom where she finds a disheartened Uncle Bear. He is sad that Lala is leaving him to move into the palace; and Lala is not sure that she is the right animal to rule the kingdom. Meanwhile, a new sinister plot is developing... The kingdom's ancient behemoths have shrunken in size after their annual migration. Investigating, Yugo, Lala and Uncle Bear are trapped in the underground kingdom of the rats where all the shrunken animals have ended up. With the help of an ingenious mole, they fight the rodent soldiers and escape. Yugo tracks down the very last behemoth in the kingdom and learns that the kingdom's water supply is being deliberately poisoned. When they learn that the only uncontaminated water left in the kingdom is under the control of the militaristic rats, Yugo and her furry friends must save the kingdom again.

== Cast ==
- Liu Xiaoyu
- Meng Quanlin
- Lu Kui
- Lin Qiang
- Yang Tianxiang
- Feng Sheng
- Song Ming

== Reception ==
The film earned CN¥61.962 million at the Chinese box office.
