= MV Mathilda Desgagnés =

Cargo vessel built to supply bases in the Canadian Arctic

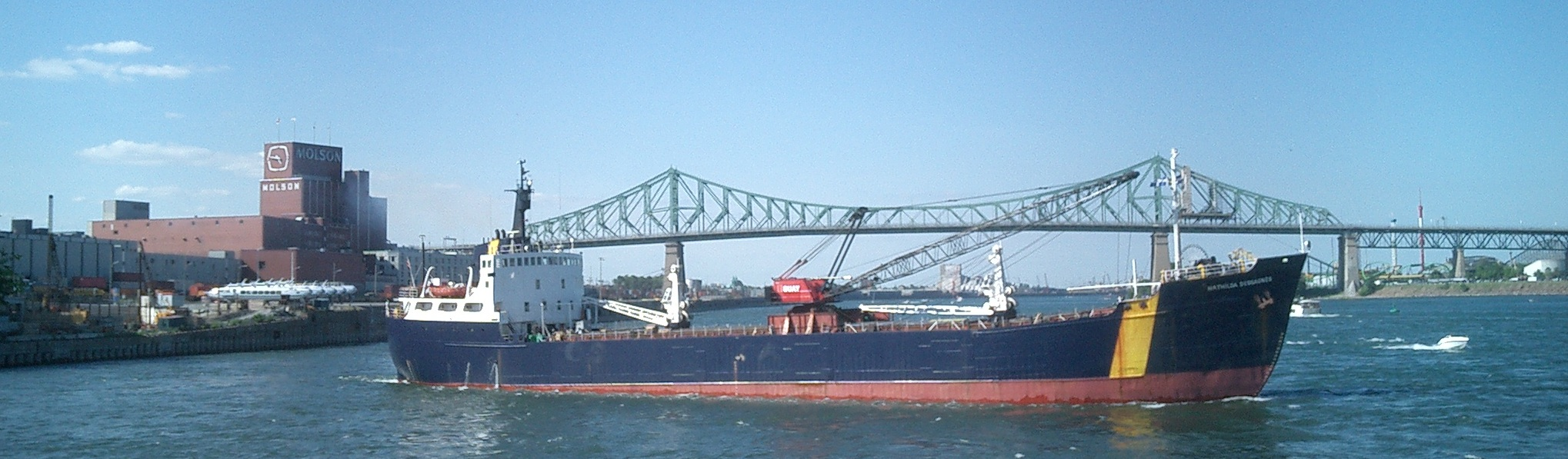
The Mathilda Desgagnes often carried cargo to Arctic bases

The Mathilda Desgagnes was the name of a cargo vessel built to supply bases in the Canadian Arctic for Canada Steamship Lines. She was built in 1959 as the MV Eskimo, a name she sailed under for 20 years. She was refitted in 1979, and sailed under the name Mathilda Desgagnes, continuing to serve the Canadian Arctic, until 2006.

In 2007 she was sold to Transcomar Shipping, of Port-au-Prince, and was renamed MV Gisela. Her registration was changed from Canada to Panama.
