= Roseanne Supernault =

Canadian film and television actress

- Born: 1993 (age 32–33)

Roseanne Supernault (born 1993) is a Canadian film and television actress, best known for her roles as Natalie Stoney in the television series Blackstone and as the title character in the 2013 film Maïna. Originally from East Prairie, Alberta, she is of Métis and Cree descent.

== Career ==
Supernault won the Best Actress Award at the 2013 American Indian Film Festival for her performance in Maïna.

A graduate of the Victoria School of Performing and Visual Arts in Edmonton, Alberta, she has also appeared in the films Rhymes for Young Ghouls and Through Black Spruce, and the television series Rabbit Fall, Into the West and Mixed Blessings.

Supernault runs acting workshops in Vancouver for Indigenous youths and has been active in the Idle No More movement.

== Filmography ==
=== Film ===
Year	Title	Role	Notes
2010	Every Emotion Costs	Quilla	
2013	Maïna	Maïna	
2013	Rhymes for Young Ghouls	Anna	
2016	Neither Wolf Nor Dog	Wenonah / Danelle	
2016	The Northlander	Mari	
2017	Juliana & the Medicine Fish	Gabby Reid	
2017	River of Silence	Tanis Wolf	
2018	Through Black Spruce	Eva	
2019	The Incredible 25th Year of Mitzi Bearclaw	Simone Muskrat	
2022	Dark Nature	Shaina	
2023	Hey, Viktor!	Rosie Getsumoni	
2024	Cold Road	Tracy	

=== Television ===
Year	Title	Role	Notes
2005	Into the West	Prairie Flower	Episode: "Wheel to the Stars"
2008	Rabbit Fall	Dawn Flamont	Episode: "Berry Fast"
2009–2014	Blackstone	Natalie Stoney	17 episodes
2010	Mixed Blessings	Teresa	Episode: "The Young Apprentice"
2011	Doomsday Prophecy	Raven	Television film
2012	Caution: May Contain Nuts	Uhura	Episode: "Telegraphed Basterds"
2014	Strange Empire	Nuttah	Episode: "The Whiskey Trader"
2015–2017	The Drive	Mia	6 episodes
2017	Jamestown	Matachanna	5 episodes
2022	Acting Good	Jo	
