= Algoma Tankers Limited =

Canadian shipping company

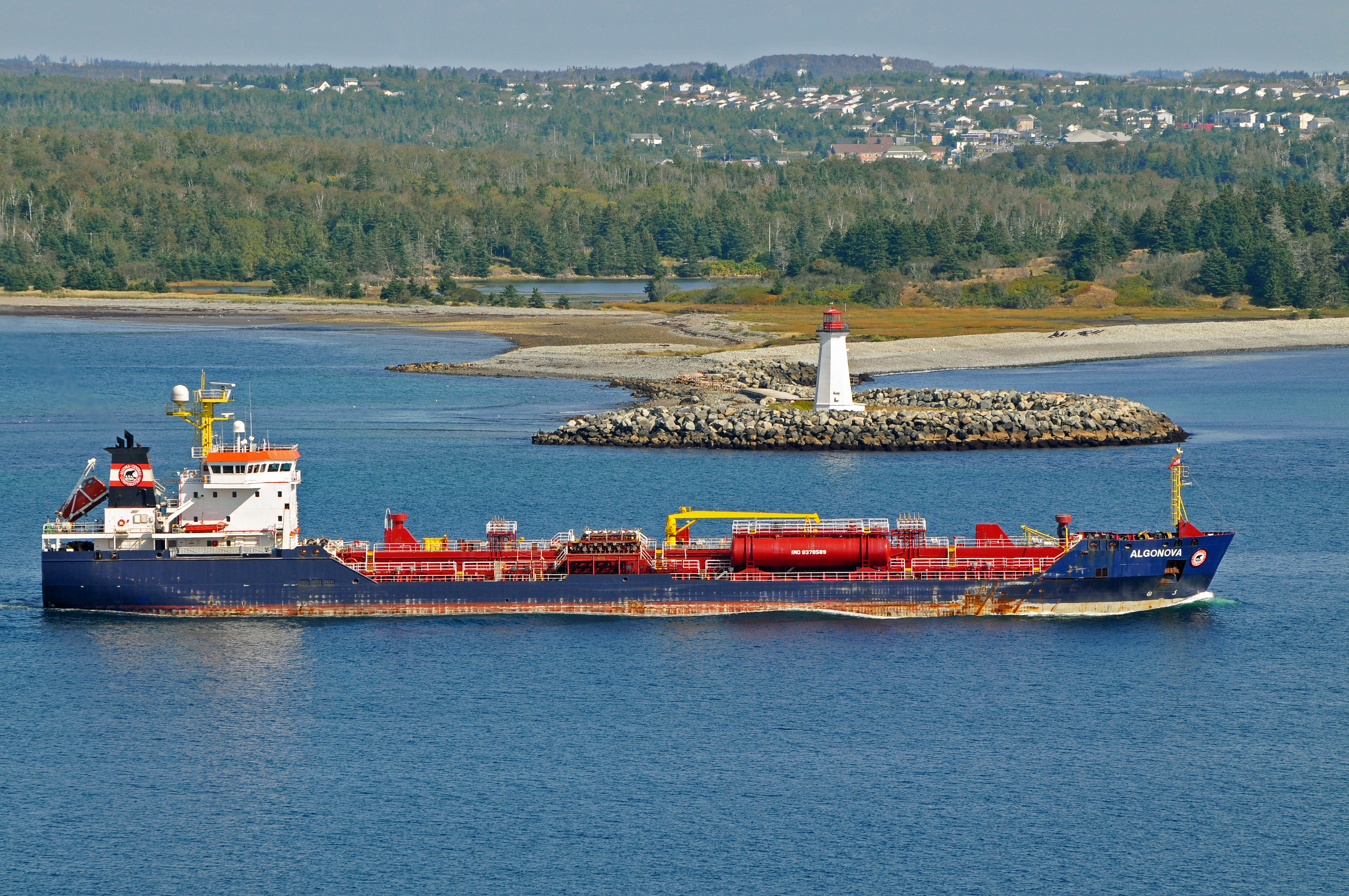
Algonova, one of the freighters in the Algoma Tankers fleet

Algoma Tankers Limited is a subsidiary of Canada's Algoma Central Marine, the country's largest inland shipping company.

Algoma Tankers Limited operates an ice‑class fleet of eight Canadian‑flag product tankers, specializing in the transportation of petroleum products throughout the Great Lakes, and St. Lawrence Seaway system. Its fleet includes Algosea, Algonova, Algoma Hansa, AlgoCanada, Algoscotia, and Algoma Dartmouth.

Some of the vessels are built to withstand traveling through moderate ice and operate in the winter.
