= Hannah Emily Anderson =

Canadian actress

- Born: Winnipeg, Manitoba, Canada
- Education: George Brown College
- Occupation: Actress
- Years active: 2012–present

Hannah Emily Anderson is a Canadian actress. She is known for her roles in the films Jigsaw and What Keeps You Alive, and the TV series The Purge.

== Early life ==
Anderson was born in Winnipeg, Manitoba. She graduated from the George Brown Theatre School in Toronto.

== Career ==
In January 2017, Anderson joined the cast of the film Jigsaw, the eighth film in the Saw franchise, playing the role of Eleanor Bonneville. The film was released in October 2017 and grossed $103 million worldwide, but received generally negative reviews from critics.

In June 2017, Anderson was cast as Jackie in the 2018 horror film What Keeps You Alive, alongside her Jigsaw co-star Brittany Allen. The film had its wide release in August 2018, and received positive reviews from critics. Dennis Harvey of Variety magazine wrote: "Anderson is very good in a pocket-size variation on Rosamund Pike's 'Gone Girl' type".

In April 2018, Anderson was cast as Jenna Betancourt, an anti-Purge proponent, in the horror series The Purge. The series is based on the franchise of the same name. The series ran for two seasons, and was cancelled in May 2020.

Anderson starred as Joy in the 2022 horror film Dark Nature, which received a limited theatrical release in North America in May 2023. In March 2023, she was cast as Mary in Return to Silent Hill, the third film in the Silent Hill film series.

== Filmography ==
=== Film ===
Year	Title	Role	Notes
2017	Love of My Life	Kaitlyn	
2017	Jigsaw	Eleanor Bonneville	
2018	What Keeps You Alive	Jackie / Megan	
2019	X-Men: Dark Phoenix	Elaine Grey	
2021	Don't Say His Name	Jessica	
2020	The Curse of Audrey Earnshaw	Bridget Dwyer	
2022	Dark Nature	Joy	
2026	Return to Silent Hill	Mary Crane / Maria / Angela / Moth Mary	

=== Television ===
Year	Title	Role	Notes
2012	The L.A. Complex	Reader	Episode: "Do Something"
2012	Saving Hope	Hannah	Episode: "The Law of Contagion"
2013	Republic of Doyle	Margot	"Retribution" (season 4; episode 9)
2014	Lizzie Borden Took an Ax	Bridget Sullivan	Television film
2014	Reign	Rowan	"Dirty Laundry" (season 1; episode 14) "The Darkness" (season 1; episode 15)
2014–2015	Lost Girl	Persephone	"Like Hell: Part 2" (season 5; episode 2) "Like Father, Like Daughter" (season 5; episode 10)
2015	Killjoys	Shyla	Episode: "The Harvest" (season 1; episode 3)
2016	Gangland Undercover	Sarah Jane	Season 2
2016	Shoot the Messenger	Chloe Channing	
2017	Girls' Night Out	Rebecca	Television film
2018	The Purge	Jenna Betancourt	Season 1
2021	My Father's Other Family	Rose McHenry	Television film (Lifetime)
2025	Smoke	Ashley Gudsen	Miniseries on Apple TV+
