= Dark Nature (2022 film) =

2022 Canadian horror film

- Film poster
- Directed by: Berkley Brady
- Written by: Berkley Brady
- Starring: Hannah Emily Anderson; Roseanne Supernault
- Cinematography: Jaryl Lim
- Edited by: David Hiatt
- Distributed by: Epic Pictures Group
- Release dates: 2022 (Fantasia Fest); May 19, 2023 (North America)
- Running time: 85 minutes
- Country: Canada
- Language: English

Dark Nature is a 2022 Canadian horror film written and directed by Berkley Brady in her directorial debut. It stars Hannah Emily Anderson, Helen Belay, Madison Walsh, Roseanne Supernault and Kyra Harper.

== Plot ==
Joy lives with her abusive boyfriend Derek. One night, he attempts to strangle her, but she fends him off and locks herself in a room. She comes out of the room to find that he has killed her dog.

Six months later, Joy has left Derek. Her long-time friend Carmen invites her on a retreat in the woods with her therapist Dr. Dunnley to help her deal with her trauma, which she accepts. Joy and Carmen travel with another patient Tara to meet Dunnley and Shaina. While travelling through the forest, Joy and Shaina discuss their respective traumas. That night, Joy experiences nightmares involving Derek and a monstrous creature.

The next day, when she and Carmen are performing a trust exercise in the forest, Joy hears Derek calling her name. She confronts Dunnley about whether they are lost. Joy later admits to Carmen that she heard Derek, which Carmen expresses doubt about, since she didn't hear anything. Around the same time, Tara becomes separated from Shaina while performing the same exercise, and hallucinates her hands being bound and bloody. After Joy finds her, she notes that she also experienced hallucinations.

While the group is walking through a cavern, Joy experiences auditory hallucinations. In the forest, Joy and Carmen are briefly separated while Joy is relieving herself. She sees Derek and the creature again, and an unseen force starts strangling her. Carmen finds her and brings her back to camp. Joy has become convinced that something is following them. That night, she experiences nightmares again.

Upon waking up the next day, the group realises that Tara has gone missing, and their supplies have vanished. While looking for Tara, Dunnley also experiences hallucinations, and goes missing as well. Joy and Carmen try and fail to persuade Shaina that they should go to get help. Shaina tries to look for Dunnley and Tara, but falls off a rock while experiencing hallucinations of her time as a soldier in Afghanistan. Joy and Carmen are unable to find her body.

While looking for the others, Joy and Carmen come across a cave, and find Tara inside it. Carmen tries to save Dunnley, but she is killed by the creature. Joy, Carmen and Tara hide from it in a cluster of logs in a nearby river, but it finds them. Tara sacrifices herself to allow Joy and Carmen to escape. They make it back to the camp to treat Carmen's leg injury.

Joy admits that she saw Derek the day they left for the retreat. It is revealed that she knocked him out in self-defense after letting him into her house. That night, the creature kidnaps Carmen, forcing Joy to return to the cave to save her. Joy sees the creature as Derek, and briefly embraces it before stabbing it and setting it on fire with Derek's lighter. She and Carmen escape from the cave with heavy injuries, and set out for a hospital.

== Cast ==
- Hannah Emily Anderson as Joy
- Madison Walsh as Carmen
- Roseanne Supernault as Shaina
- Helen Belay as Tara
- Kyra Harper as Dr. Carol Dunnley
- Daniel Arnold as Derek

== Production ==
Filming took place in the fall of 2021 near the Canyon Creek Ice Cave in Kananaskis. The production set was occasionally visited by a grizzly bear.

== Release ==
The film premiered at the Fantasia International Film Festival in 2022. It was screened at the Marché du Film, and at film festivals in England, Ireland, Japan, Sweden, Wales and several cities in the United States.

The film received a limited theatrical release across North America on 19 May 2023. It was released on video on demand on 23 May. It is distributed by the Epic Pictures Group under their Dread label.

== Reception ==
On the review aggregator website Rotten Tomatoes, the film has an approval rating of 71% based on 17 reviews, with an average rating of 6.2/10.

Joe Lipsett of Bloody Disgusting gave the film 3/5 stars, noting its similarities to The Descent and writing: "Unfortunately, Dark Nature skips over its most unique and intriguing elements... in order to get to the only-somewhat satisfying violent bits. The make-up effects are solid, sure, but the film laid the groundwork for a deeper exploration of healing via female friendships and therapy that ultimately fails to pay off." Rachel Reeves of Rue Morgue magazine called the film "a vital feature debut with a strong voice, style and story", adding that director Berkley Brady "mixes up a tasty cinematic cocktail strongly infused with her own creative flavor." Rachel West of the Alliance of Women Film Journalists wrote, "Clocking in at less than 90 minutes, Dark Nature never feels rushed. Though certain aspects may come across as underdeveloped at times (namely some of the women’s backstories), the story is held together by a strong female ensemble."

The film was longlisted for the 2022 Jean-Marc Vallée DGC Discovery Award.
