= Double-hulled tanker =

Plan of a double-hulled tanker

A double-hulled tanker refers to an oil tanker which has a double hull. They reduce the likelihood of leaks occurring compared to single-hulled tankers, and their ability to prevent or reduce oil spills led to double hulls being standardized for oil tankers and other types of ships including by the International Convention for the Prevention of Pollution from Ships or MARPOL Convention. After the Exxon Valdez oil spill disaster in Alaska in 1989, the US government required all new oil tankers built for use between US ports to be equipped with a full double hull.

== Reasons for use ==
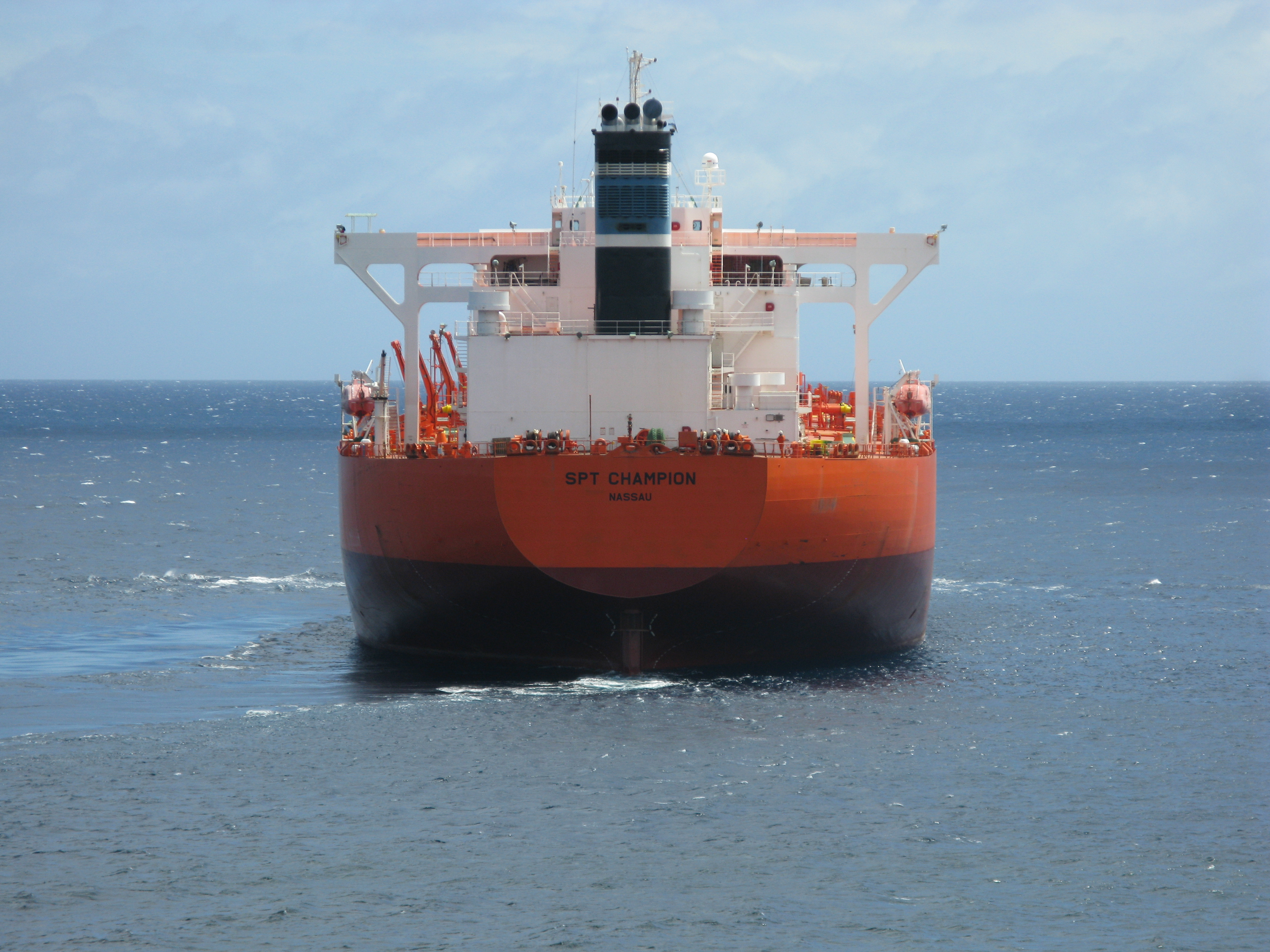
The double-hulled SPT Champion in Curaçao

A number of manufacturers have embraced oil tankers with a double hull because it strengthens the hull of ships, reducing the likelihood of oil disasters in low-impact collisions and groundings over single-hull ships. They reduce the likelihood of leaks occurring at low speed impacts in port areas when the ship is under pilotage. Research of impact damage of ships has revealed that double-hulled tankers are unlikely to perforate both hulls in a collision, preventing oil from seeping out. However, for smaller tankers, U-shaped tanks might be susceptible to "free flooding" across the double bottom and up to the outside water level each side of the cargo tank. Salvors prefer to salvage doubled-hulled tankers because they permit the use of air pressure to vacuum out the flood water. In the 1960s, collision proof double hulls for nuclear ships were extensively investigated, due to escalating concerns over nuclear accidents.

The ability of double-hulled tankers to prevent or reduce oil spills led to double hulls being standardized for other types of ships including oil tankers by the International Convention for the Prevention of Pollution from Ships or MARPOL Convention. In 1992, MARPOL was amended, making it "mandatory for tankers of 5,000 dwt and more ordered after 6 July 1993 to be fitted with double hulls, or an alternative design approved by IMO". However, in the aftermath of the Erika incident of the coast off France in December 1999, members of IMO adopted a revised schedule for the phase-out of single-hull tankers, which came into effect on 1 September 2003, with further amendments validated on 5 April 2005.

After the Exxon Valdez oil spill disaster, when that ship grounded on Bligh Reef outside the port of Valdez, Alaska in 1989, the US government required all new oil tankers built for use between US ports to be equipped with a full double hull. However, the damage to Exxon Valdez penetrated sections of the hull (the slops oil tanks, or slop tanks) that were protected by a double bottom, or partial double hull.

== Maintenance issues ==
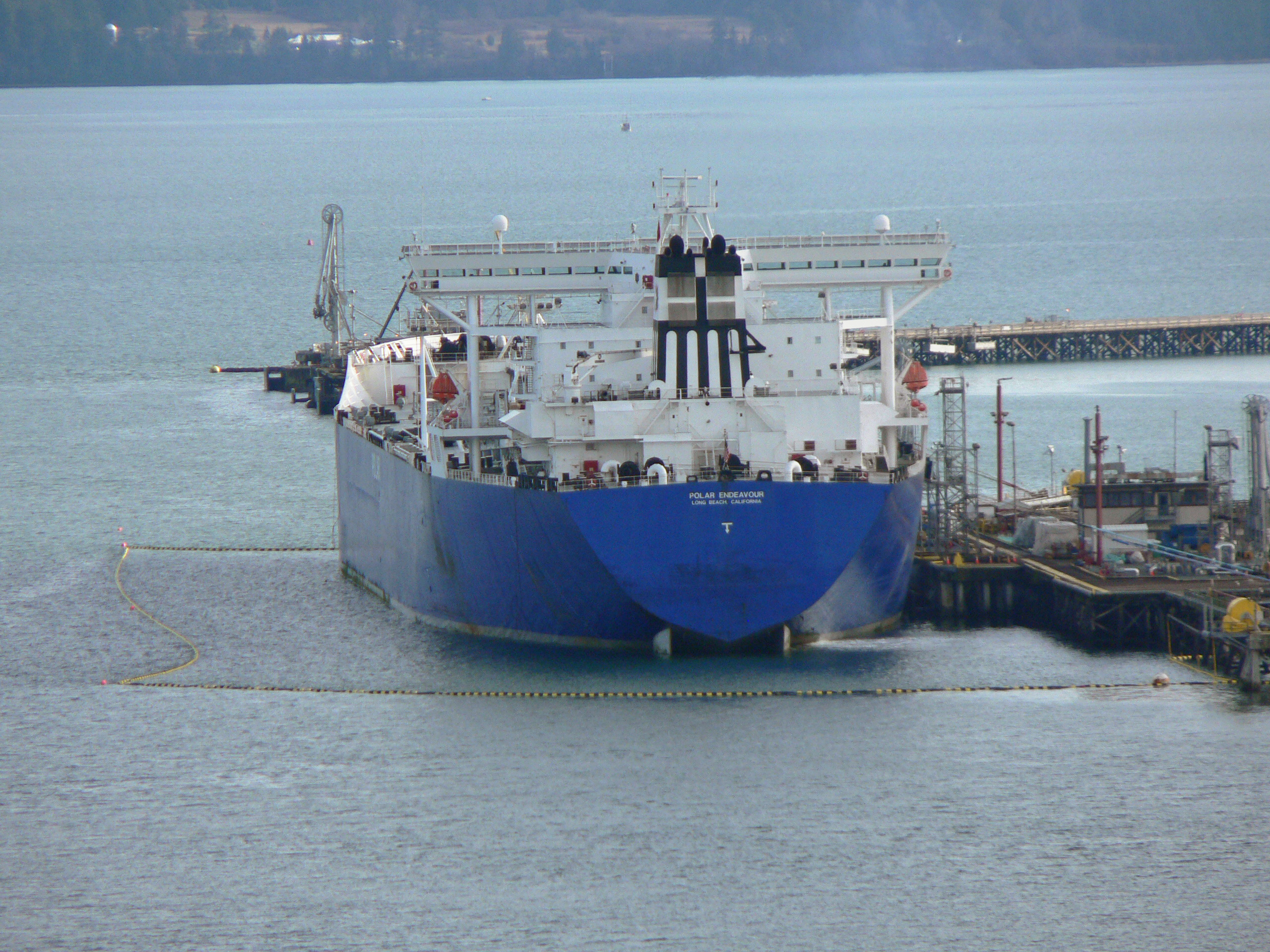
The double-hulled Polar Endeavour

Although double-hulled tankers reduce the likelihood of ships grazing rocks and creating holes in the hull, a double hull does not protect against major, high-energy collisions or groundings which cause the majority of oil pollution, despite this being the reason that the double hull was mandated by United States legislation. Double-hulled tankers, if poorly designed, constructed, maintained and operated can be as problematic, if not more problematic than their single-hulled counterparts. Double-hulled tankers have a more complex design and structure than their single-hulled counterparts, which means that they require more maintenance and care in operating, which if not subject to responsible monitoring and policing, may cause problems. Double hulls often result in the weight of the hull increasing by at least 20%, and because the steel weight of doubled-hulled tanks should not be greater than that of single-hulled ships, the individual hull walls are typically thinner and theoretically less resistant to wear. Double hulls by no means eliminate the possibility of the hulls breaking apart. Due to the air space between the hulls, there is also a potential problem with volatile gases seeping out through worn areas of the internal hull, increasing the risk of an explosion.

Several international conventions against pollution are in place, as of 2003 but there was still no formal body setting international mandatory standards. The International Safety Guide for Oil Tankers and Terminals (ISGOTT) does provide guidelines giving advice on optimum use and safety. For example, it recommends ballast tanks are not entered while loaded with cargo, and that weekly samples are made of the atmosphere inside for hydrocarbon gas. Due to the difficulties of maintenance, ship builders have been competitive in producing double-hulled ships which are easier to inspect, such as ballast and cargo tanks which are easily accessible and easier to spot corrosion in the hull. The Tanker Structure Cooperative Forum (TSCF) published the Guide to Inspection and Maintenance of Double-Hull Tanker Structures in 1995 giving advice based on experience of operating double-hulled tankers.

== See also ==
- MV Kalia
