= Evan Helmuth =

American actor (1977–2017)

- Born: Evan Hershey Helmuth; May 18, 1977; Reston, Virginia, U.S.
- Died: July 17, 2017 (aged 40); Los Angeles, California, U.S.
- Education: Interlochen Arts Academy; USC School of Dramatic Arts (B.A.)
- Occupation: Actor
- Years active: 1999–2015

Evan Hershey Helmuth (May 18, 1977 – July 17, 2017) was an American film and television actor. Helmuth was best known for his lead role as Father David Keane in the 2012 horror film, The Devil Inside. His other film credits included Fever Pitch in 2005, in which he played Jimmy Fallon's best friend, Ready or Not in 2009, and Jobs in 2013.

== Biography ==
=== Early life ===
Helmuth was born May 18, 1977, to John William Helmuth and Kerry O’Brien Helmuth. He was raised in Reston, Virginia until the age of 10, when his family moved to Ames, Iowa. Helmuth initially attended arts camp at Interlochen Center for the Arts in Interlochen, Michigan for several summers before enrolling at Interlochen's full-time high school arts academy for three years. He graduated from Interlochen as a theater major in 1995.

Helmuth studied at the University of Southern California's School of Dramatic Arts, where he received his bachelor's degree in 1999 as the recipient of USC's Jack Nicholson Award for outstanding actor. While attending USC, Helmuth met writer and producer Josh Appelbaum, who later co-wrote the 2005 episode of the television series, Alias, that featured Helmuth as a guest star.

=== Career ===
Helmuth worked in film and television following his graduation from the University of Southern California, including Garfield: The Movie in 2004.

In 2005, Helmuth appeared in the Farrelly brothers' romantic comedy, Fever Pitch, as Troy, the best friend and sidekick of Jimmy Fallon's character. Helmuth later co-starred in the 2009 independent comedy, Ready or Not, alongside Christian Oliver and Seamus Dever.

Helmuth was best known for his lead role as Father David Keane in the 2012 horror film, The Devil Inside, directed by William Brent Bell. The film, which stars Fernanda Andrade, Helmuth, and Simon Quarterman, was produced on a shoestring budget. However, the film debuted with a surprising $34.5 million to win its opening weekend in January 2012.

Most recently, Helmuth appeared in the 2013 biopic, Jobs.

In addition to his spot on Alias, Helmuth's television credits included guest roles on NCIS (2006), Bones (2012), Rizzoli & Isles (2012), Perception (2013), and Battle Creek (2015).

=== Death ===
Helmuth died at the age of 40 on July 17, 2017, in Los Angeles, California, after complications from a stroke.

== Filmography ==
=== Film ===
Year	Title	Role	Notes
1999	Self Storage	Evan	
2002	Speakeasy	Hotel Employee #2	
2002	The United States of Leland	Grocery Guy	
2004	Dead & Breakfast	The Bass Player	
2004	Garfield: The Movie	Steward	
2005	Fever Pitch	Troy	
2007	Mr. Woodcock	Dinosaur / Watson	Uncredited
2008	The Last Lullaby	Frank Bart	Uncredited
2009	Ready or Not	Lawrence	
2009	Other People's Parties	Kevin	
2010	Removal	Todd	
2011	Love's Christmas Journey	Deputy Harve	TV movie (Hallmark Channel)
2012	The Devil Inside	Father David Keane	
2012	Commander and Chief	Jared	
2013	Jobs	Francis	

=== Television ===
Year	Title	Role	Notes
2002	Fastlane	Elvin	Episode: "Mighty Blue"
2004	American Family	P.F.C. Smith	Episode: "Shadows"
2005	E-Ring	Marcus	Episode: "Delta Does Detroit"
2005	Alias	Man in a Suit	Episode: "The Horizon"
2006	NCIS	Jeff Beilsman	Episode: "Family Secret"
2006	CSI: NY	Blake Mathers	Episode: "All Access"
2007	What About Brian	Trip Hanley	Episode: "What About Temptations"
2010	Castle	Nick Johnston	Episode: "He's Dead, She's Dead
2012	Bones	Karl Singler	Episode: "The Warrior in the Wuss"
2012	Awake	Ronald Petrowski	Episode: "Say Hello to My Little Friend"
2012	The Client List	Phil	Episode: "The Cold Hard Truth"
2012	Rizzoli & Isles	Jake Spencer	Episode: "Throwing Down the Gauntlet"
2013	Perception	Charlie Kendricks	Episode: "Ch-Ch-Changes"
2015	Battle Creek	Mike Goodman	Episode: "Old Wounds", (final appearance)

=== Video games ===
Year	Title	Role	Notes
2000	MechWarrior 4: Vengeance	William Dresari	Voice role
2011	L.A. Noire	Michael Driscoll	Voice role
