= Lindenlaub =

Lindenlaub is a surname. Notable people with the surname include:

- Andreas Lindenlaub (born 1949), German politician (DSU) and former representative of the People's Chamber of East Germany
- Dieter Lindenlaub (Professor Dr. Dieter Lindenlaub), professor of economics
- Karl Walter Lindenlaub (born 1957), German cinematographer
- Uwe Lindenlaub (born 1966), German table tennis-player
