= Hollywood Music in Media Award for Best Original Score in a Sci-Fi/Fantasy Film =

Film score award

Hollywood Music in Media for Best Original Score in a Sci-Fi/Fantasy/Horror Film
- Country: United States
- Presented by: Hollywood Music in Media Awards (HMMA)
- First award: 2014
- Currently held by: Daniel Pemberton; Project Hail Mary (2026)
- Website: www.hmmawards.com

The Hollywood Music in Media Award for Best Original Score in a Sci-Fi/Fantasy Film is one of the awards given annually to people working in the motion picture industry by the Hollywood Music in Media Awards (HMMA). It is presented to the composers who have composed the best "original" score, written specifically for a sci-fi/fantasy motion picture. It was grouped with "horror" films, until that genre was given its own category. The award was first given in 2014, during the fifth annual awards.

== Winners and nominees ==
=== 2010s ===
Hollywood Music in Media Award for Best Original Score in a Sci-Fi/Fantasy Film

Year	Film	Nominees
(2014); 5th
(2014); 5th	The Hobbit: The Desolation of Smaug	Howard Shore
(2014); 5th	Dawn of the Planet of the Apes	Michael Giacchino
(2014); 5th	Guardians of the Galaxy	Tyler Bates
(2014); 5th	Maleficent	James Newton Howard
(2014); 5th	Noah	Clint Mansell
(2014); 5th	Transformers: Age of Extinction	Steve Jablonsky
(2015); 6th
(2015); 6th	Mad Max: Fury Road	Junkie XL
(2015); 6th	Ant-Man	Christophe Beck
(2015); 6th	Avengers: Age of Ultron	Danny Elfman and Brian Tyler
(2015); 6th	Cinderella	Patrick Doyle
(2015); 6th	The Martian	Harry Gregson-Williams
(2015); 6th	Tomorrowland	Michael Giacchino
(2016); 7th
(2016); 7th	The Jungle Book	John Debney
(2016); 7th	Arrival	Jóhann Jóhannsson
(2016); 7th	Doctor Strange	Michael Giacchino
(2016); 7th	Midnight Special	David Wingo
(2016); 7th	10 Cloverfield Lane	Bear McCreary
(2016); 7th	X-Men: Apocalypse	John Ottman

Hollywood Music in Media Award for Best Original Score in a Sci-Fi/Fantasy/Horror Film

Year	Film	Nominees
(2017); 8th
(2017); 8th	The Shape of Water	Alexandre Desplat
(2017); 8th	Blade Runner 2049	Benjamin Wallfisch & Hans Zimmer
(2017); 8th	Get Out	Michael Abels
(2017); 8th	Logan	Marco Beltrami
(2017); 8th	Thor: Ragnarok	Mark Mothersbaugh
(2017); 8th	Wonder Woman	Rupert Gregson-Williams
(2018); 9th
(2018); 9th	Black Panther	Ludwig Göransson
(2018); 9th	Ant-Man and the Wasp	Christophe Beck
(2018); 9th	Deadpool 2	Tyler Bates
(2018); 9th	Mary Poppins Returns	Marc Shaiman
(2018); 9th	A Quiet Place	Marco Beltrami
(2018); 9th	Ready Player One	Alan Silvestri

Hollywood Music in Media Award for Best Original Score in a Sci-Fi/Fantasy Film

Year	Film	Nominees
(2019); 10th
(2019); 10th	Avengers: Endgame	Alan Silvestri
(2019); 10th	Alita: Battle Angel	Junkie XL
(2019); 10th	Dark Phoenix	Hans Zimmer
(2019); 10th	Maleficent: Mistress of Evil	Geoff Zanelli
(2019); 10th	Shazam!	Benjamin Wallfisch
(2019); 10th	Spider-Man: Far From Home	Michael Giacchino

=== 2020s ===
Year	Film	Nominees
(2020); 11th
(2020); 11th	Tenet	Ludwig Göransson
(2020); 11th	The New Mutants	Mark Snow
(2020); 11th	The Old Guard	Volker Bertelmann & Dustin O'Halloran
(2020); 11th	Palm Springs	Matthew Compton
(2020); 11th	Wonder Woman 1984	Hans Zimmer
(2021); 12th
(2021); 12th	Dune	Hans Zimmer
(2021); 12th	Black Widow	Lorne Balfe
(2021); 12th	Cinderella	Mychael Danna & Jessica Weiss
(2021); 12th	Shang-Chi and the Legend of the Ten Rings	Joel P. West
(2021); 12th	The Suicide Squad	John Murphy
(2022); 13th
(2022); 13th	Doctor Strange in the Multiverse of Madness	Danny Elfman
(2022); 13th	Black Adam	Lorne Balfe
(2022); 13th	Black Panther: Wakanda Forever	Ludwig Göransson
(2022); 13th	Spider-Man: No Way Home	Michael Giacchino
(2022); 13th	The Batman	Michael Giacchino
(2022); 13th	Thor: Love and Thunder	Michael Giacchino
(2023); 14th
(2023); 14th	The Marvels	Laura Karpman
(2023); 14th	Asteroid City	Alexandre Desplat
(2023); 14th	Barbie	Mark Ronson and Andrew Wyatt
(2023); 14th	The Creator	Hans Zimmer
(2023); 14th	The Hunger Games: The Ballad of Songbirds & Snakes	James Newton Howard
(2023); 14th	Transformers: Rise of the Beasts	Jongnic Bontemps
(2024); 15th
(2024); 15th	Dune: Part Two	Hans Zimmer
(2024); 15th	Deadpool & Wolverine	Rob Simonsen
(2024); 15th	Furiosa: A Mad Max Saga	Tom Holkenborg
(2024); 15th	IF	Michael Giacchino
(2024); 15th	Red One	Henry Jackman
(2025); 16th
(2025); 16th	Avatar: Fire and Ash	Simon Franglen
(2025); 16th	Jurassic World Rebirth	Alexandre Desplat
(2025); 16th	Momo	Fil Eisler
(2025); 16th	Creation of the Gods II: Demon Force	Gordy Haab
(2025); 16th	Captain America: Brave New World	Laura Karpman
(2025); 16th	The Fantastic Four: First Steps	Michael Giacchino
(2025); 16th	Tron: Ares	Nine Inch Nails
(2025); 16th	Thunderbolts*	Son Lux
(2026); 17th
(2026); 17th	Project Hail Mary	Daniel Pemberton
(2026); 17th	Disclosure Day	John Williams
(2026); 17th	Dune: Part Three	Hans Zimmer
(2026); 17th	Hope	Michael Abels
(2026); 17th	Spider-Man: Brand New Day	Michael Giacchino
(2026); 17th	The Hunger Games: Sunrise on the Reaping	James Newton Howard
(2026); 17th	Whalefall	Joseph Trapanese
