= The Boy (2016 film) =

2016 film by William Brent Bell

- Theatrical release poster
- Directed by: William Brent Bell
- Written by: Stacey Menear
- Produced by: Jim Wedaa; Roy Lee; Matt Berenson; Tom Rosenberg; Gary Lucchesi; Richard Wright
- Starring: Lauren Cohan; Rupert Evans
- Cinematography: Daniel Pearl
- Edited by: Brian Berdan
- Music by: Bear McCreary
- Production companies: Lakeshore Entertainment; Huayi Brothers Pictures; Vertigo Entertainment; STXfilms
- Distributed by: STX Entertainment (United States); Huayi Brothers (China)
- Release dates: January 20, 2016 (Los Angeles, California); January 22, 2016 (United States); April 1, 2016 (China)
- Running time: 97 minutes
- Countries: United States; China
- Language: English
- Budget: $10 million
- Box office: $73.9 million

The Boy is a 2016 horror film directed by William Brent Bell and written by Stacey Menear. The film stars Lauren Cohan and Rupert Evans. It is an international co-production between China and the United States. Filming began on March 10, 2015, in Victoria, British Columbia. STXfilms released The Boy in the United States on January 22. The film received mixed to negative reviews from critics and grossed $73 million worldwide on a $10 million budget. A sequel, Brahms: The Boy II, was released on February 21, 2020.

== Plot ==
Greta Evans, an American travelling in the United Kingdom, is hired as a nanny by the elderly Heelshires. The couple introduce Greta to her charge, a doll named Brahms, which the Heelshires treat as if it were their real son. They coach Greta on taking care of Brahms and their house while they are on holiday.

Greta ignores the rules. She regularly calls her sister, who tells her that Greta's abusive ex-boyfriend Cole has been trying to find out where she is. Malcolm, the Heelshires' "grocery boy", stops by often, and Greta learns from him that the real Brahms was killed in a fire 20 years ago on his eighth birthday. Malcolm asks Greta out and she accepts. While showering for her date, her dress and jewellery vanish. She investigates a noise in the attic, but ends up getting trapped and inadvertently knocked unconscious, missing her date. She explains to Malcolm what happened, and they discuss the real Brahms, whom Malcolm says Mr. Heelshire described as "odd".

Strange events occur. Greta locks herself in her room. She then finds a peanut butter and jelly sandwich outside her door and a child's voice promises he will be good. Greta begins to take the rules seriously.

She realizes that the doll only moves when she is not in the room with him. Malcolm informs Greta that a girl Brahms was friends with (named Emily Cribbs) was found in the forest with her skull crushed. Afterwards, the Heelshires' house was burnt down with him in it. Malcolm warns her not to stay but Greta feels obligated to care for Brahms, believing that the child's spirit is possessing the doll. The Heelshires write a goodbye letter to Brahms before drowning themselves.

Cole arrives unexpectedly, demanding Greta return to America with him in the morning. Malcolm arrives and offers his help, but she declines it, so he leaves, but stays in his car to be nearby. Greta asks the doll for help and Cole wakes up and sees a message written in blood telling him to leave. Cole gets angry and Malcolm comes back in to investigate the commotion. Cole smashes the doll to pieces, which causes the house to begin to shake, and they hear noises behind the walls. A mirror explodes and the real, living Brahms — a full grown man, who had been hiding in the walls and wearing a doll mask — emerges from it and kills Cole.

Greta and Malcolm flee into the wall cavity where the real Brahms had been hiding, and discover Brahms' room, along with a female doll dressed in Greta's stolen dress. Brahms knocks out Malcolm but Greta is able to escape the house, before returning to save Malcolm. She realizes Brahms is still child-like, and invokes the rules and forces Brahms to bed. He asks for a good night kiss, which Greta gives and uses it as a distraction to stab him. Brahms tries to choke her but she pushes the weapon in deeper and he collapses. Greta rescues Malcolm and they escape.

In a final scene, someone is seen repairing the doll.

== Cast ==
- Lauren Cohan as Greta Evans
- Rupert Evans as Malcolm
- Jim Norton as Mr. Heelshire
- Diana Hardcastle as Mrs. Heelshire
- Ben Robson as Cole
- Stephanie Lemelin as voice of Sandy
- Jett Klyne as young Brahms Heelshire
- James Russell as adult Brahms Heelshire
- Lily Pater as Emily Cribbs

== Production ==
=== Development ===
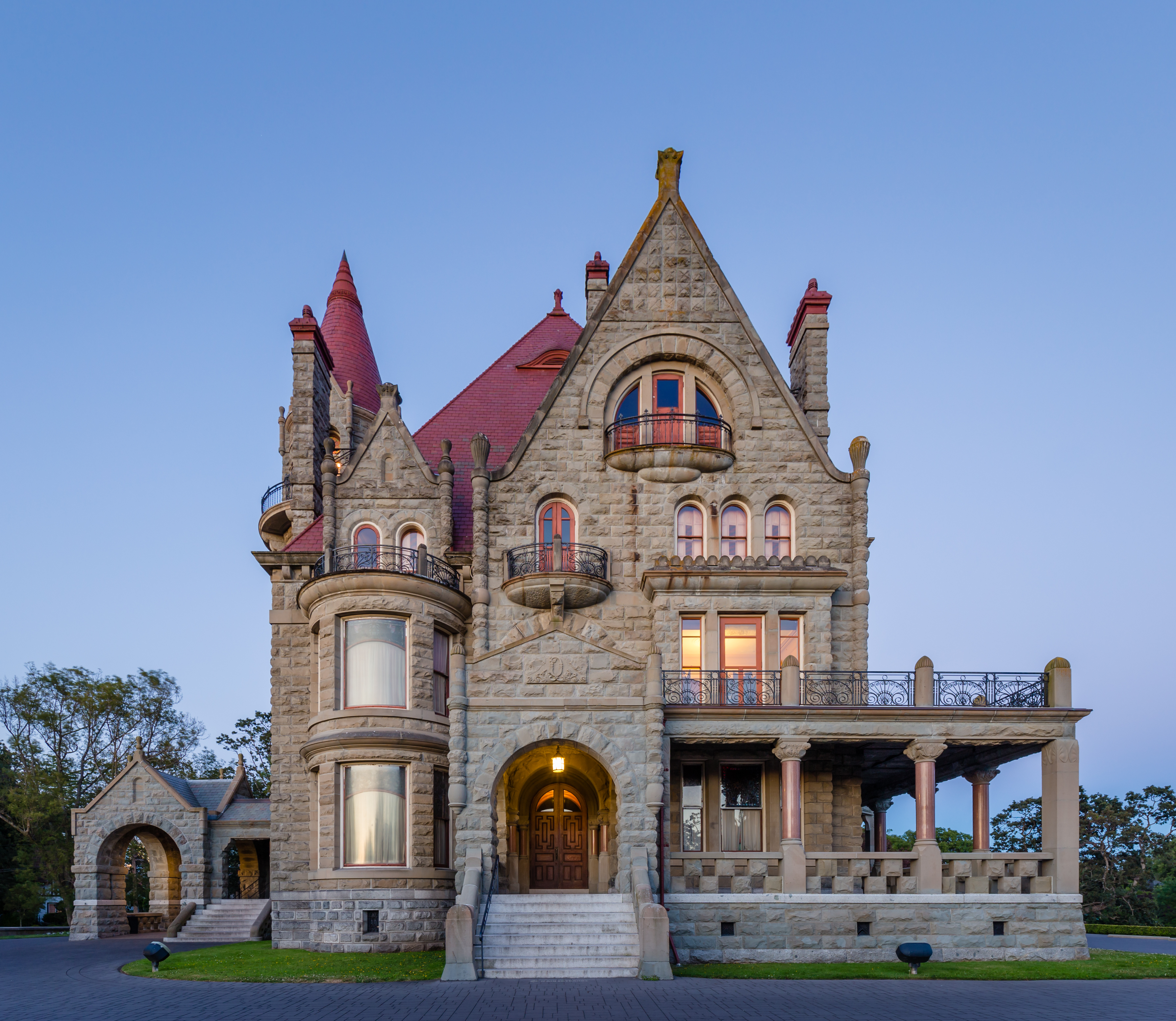
Craigdarroch Castle, used as the filming location for The Boy

On July 14, 2014, it was announced that The Devil Inside's director William Brent Bell was set to direct a supernatural thriller, The Inhabitant, which Tom Rosenberg and Gary Lucchesi would produce through Lakeshore Entertainment, along with Roy Lee, Matt Berenson, Jim Wedaa, through Vertigo Entertainment. The script was written by Stacey Menear.

=== Casting ===
On January 23, 2015, Lauren Cohan signed on to star for the lead role in the film, which by then had been retitled The Boy. On March 11, 2015, more cast members were announced, including Jim Norton, Diana Hardcastle, Ben Robson, Rupert Evans and James Russell.

=== Filming ===
On March 10, 2015, principal photography on The Boy officially began in Victoria, British Columbia, Canada, at Craigdarroch Castle. Filming was completed a month later, on April 12, 2015.

== Release ==
On February 25, 2015, STX Entertainment acquired the US rights to the film and set the film for a February 5, 2016, release, but in March 2015 the release of the film was moved up to January 22, 2016.

=== Home media ===
The Boy was released on DVD and Blu-ray on May 10, 2016. A 4K UHD Blu-ray released occurred on September 3, 2024. It grossed $4.051 million in home video sales.

== Reception ==
=== Box office ===
The Boy grossed $35.8 million in the United States and Canada, and $38.1 million in other territories, for a worldwide total of $73.9 million, against a production budget of $10 million.

The film was released in the United States on January 22, 2016, alongside Dirty Grandpa and The 5th Wave, and was projected to gross $10–13 million from 2,671 theaters in its opening weekend. The film made $3.9 million on its first day and $10.8 million in its opening weekend, finishing fifth at the box office.

=== Critical response ===
On Rotten Tomatoes, the film holds an approval rating of 31% based on 64 reviews and an average rating of 4.50/10. The site's consensus reads "The Boy could have gone in any number of scary or interesting directions, but instead settles for usual jump scares scattered throughout a pedestrian plot." Metacritic gives the film a weighted average score of 42 out of 100 based on 10 critics, indicating "mixed or average reviews". Audiences polled by CinemaScore gave the film an average grade of "B−" on an A+ to F scale.

Joe Leydon criticized the average story line in Variety and commented, "Despite game efforts by the cast, this tepid horror opus is never scary enough to overcome its silly premise." Chris Alexander of ShockTilYouDrop called it "one of the best contemporary wide-release horror movies I've seen in years". A review for The Wrap stated that the "scary-doll horror flick is creepy and clever".

In 2017, GQ Magazine called it "the most underrated horror movie of 2016".

== Sequel ==
By October 2018, it was announced that a sequel was in development. Katie Holmes was cast to play Liza, the mother of a young family who, unaware of the dark history, move into the Heelshire Mansion. The premise follows the story of the youngest son finding the porcelain doll, and befriending Brahms. William Brent Bell and Stacey Menear returned as director and screenwriter, respectively. Tom Rosenberg, Gary Lucchesi, Eric Reid, Matt Berenson, Jim Wedaa and Roy Lee served as producers. It was released on February 21, 2020.

== See also ==
- List of horror films of 2016
- Bad Ronald, a 1974 film also featuring a troubled boy who murders a young girl and is then hidden by a parent in the walls of his house.
