= Trust Me, I'm a Doctor (film) =

2026 film by Thane Economou

- Directed by: Thane Economou
- Written by: Thane Economou
- Based on: Trust Me, I'm a Doctor: My Life Before, During and After Anna Nicole Smith by Sandeep Kapoor
- Produced by: Ryan Hawkins; Al Engemann; Rebecca Case; Geenah Krisht
- Starring: Kal Penn; Abbie Cornish; Linda Hamilton
- Cinematography: Bobby Shore
- Edited by: Brian Berdan
- Music by: Kshmr; Daniel Stockdale
- Production companies: Stadium Films; Picture Movers Anonymous; Good Good Films
- Distributed by: Briarcliff Entertainment
- Release date: October 16, 2026
- Running time: 111 minutes
- Country: United States
- Language: English
- Box office: $250,043

Trust Me, I'm a Doctor is a 2026 American biographical film written and directed by Thane Economou. Based on Sandeep Kapoor's 2017 memoir Trust Me, I'm a Doctor: My Life Before, During and After Anna Nicole Smith, the film depicts Kapoor's relationship with Anna Nicole Smith as her physician and the criminal case brought against him in the wake of her death.

The film opened to negative reviews.

== Plot ==
Doctor Sandeep Kapoor is eating lunch when an elderly woman, Margie, collapses at another table. He performs CPR until an ambulance arrives. He befriends Margie's physician, Victor Kovner, and purchases Kovner's practice when he retires.

Kovner introduces Kapoor to Anna Nicole Smith, whom he treats and prescribes to under a pseudonym to protect her privacy. Smith takes a number of medications to manage chronic pain, including an exceptionally high dose of methadone. Kapoor finds this unorthodox, as methadone is more commonly used to treat opioid use disorder, which Smith has no history of, but he ultimately agrees to continue to prescribe it to her.

Smith introduces Kapoor to Howard K. Stern, an attorney who worked on her marital inheritance lawsuit before becoming her business manager, and Larry Birkhead, her photographer. Smith invites Kapoor, a gay man, to join her aboard her float at the West Hollywood pride parade. He joins her at a debaucherous afterparty at The Abbey, despite considering it an ethical breach of the doctor–patient relationship.

Smith becomes pregnant and stops taking her methadone, worried it will harm her unborn daughter. Kapoor advises her to continue, judging that her withdrawals will be more harmful for the baby than the methadone would be. Smith and Stern travel to the Bahamas for the birth, which Kapoor suspects is for Stern to take advantage of lax Bahamian laws to declare paternity. Smith's adult son Daniel comes to Kapoor for shoulder pain before traveling to the Bahamas to join her. Daniel dies after mixing medications Kapoor prescribed him with his mother's methadone.

Months later, Smith dies in a Florida from a prescription drug overdose of her own. A media frenzy erupts, centered on Kapoor, and his medical office and home are raided by the Medical Board of California. Kapoor, Stern, and Smith's psychiatrist Khristine Eroshevich are charged with multiple felonies in an alleged criminal conspiracy to supply Smith with excessive prescription drugs and cover it up, leading to her death. Kapoor hires high-profile attorney Ellyn Garofalo to mount his criminal defense and manage his crisis communications.

Garofalo arranges for Kapoor to be interviewed by Harvey Levin on TMZ so he can defend his public image. Kapoor argues that the case has been overly sensationalized, and that he is being scapegoated by California Attorney General Jerry Brown and Los Angeles County District Attorney Steve Cooley, whom he argues are seeking a high-profile prosecution in order to score political points as they seek higher offices in the upcoming election.

At trial, Garofalo is able to get several pieces of evidence excluded, and impeach the testimony of several key prosecution witnesses. Stern and Eroshevich are convicted on some of the charges, while Kapoor is found not guilty on all counts.

Years later, Kapoor meets Smith's daughter Dannielynn, who is being raised in relative anonymity by Birkhead, who has been ruled to be her real father. Stern's and Eroshevich's convictions are overturned on appeal. Kapoor receives a call from Levin, inviting him to come on TMZ and opine on the prosecution of Michael Jackson's physician after Jackson's death from prescription drugs.

== Cast ==
- Kal Penn as Sandeep Kapoor
- Abbie Cornish as Anna Nicole Smith
- Linda Hamilton as Ellyn Garofalo, Kapoor's attorney
- David Julian Hirsh as Howard K. Stern
- Elon Gold as Harvey Levin
- Jocelyne Zucco as Margie, an elderly patient Kapoor befriends
- Jordan Kronis as Daniel Smith, Anna's adult son
- Virginia Cowan as Khristine Eroshevich, Anna's psychiatrist
