= Brian Berdan =

American film editor

Brian Berdan is an American film editor.

== Personal life ==
After graduating from UC Berkeley in 1984, Berdan started his career with a job sweeping floors at Studio C, in San Francisco, then moved on to Lucasfilm in the post production division. From there, he began his freelance editing career as an apprentice editor on David Lynch's Blue Velvet. He also trained on Peter Bogdanovich's Noises Off and Oliver Stone's Heaven & Earth. It was Stone who gave Berdan his first credit as Editor on the manic and controversial Natural Born Killers. He continued working with Stone on Nixon and U Turn.

== Filmography ==
Editor
Year	Film	Director	Notes
1994	Natural Born Killers	Oliver Stone	Second collaboration with Oliver Stone
1995	The Sadness of Sex	Rupert Wainwright	
1995	Nixon	Oliver Stone	Third collaboration with Oliver Stone
1997	Grosse Pointe Blank	George Armitage	First collaboration with George Armitage
1998	Smoke Signals	Chris Eyre	
1998	Around the Fire	John Jacobsen	
1999	The Book of Stars	Michael Miner	
2000	Auggie Rose	Matthew Tabak	
2001	Finder's Fee	Jeff Probst	
2002	The Mothman Prophecies	Mark Pellington	
2004	The Big Bounce	George Armitage	Second collaboration with George Armitage
2005	The Cave	Bruce Hunt	
2006	Crank	Mark Neveldine; Brian Taylor	First collaboration with Mark Neveldine and Brian Taylor
2006	Outsourced	John Jeffcoat	
2007	Cleaner	Renny Harlin	First collaboration with Renny Harlin
2009	12 Rounds	Renny Harlin	Second collaboration with Renny Harlin
2011	Love	William Eubank	First collaboration with William Eubank
2011	5 Days of War	Renny Harlin	Third collaboration with Renny Harlin
2011	Ghost Rider: Spirit of Vengeance	Mark Neveldine; Brian Taylor	Second collaboration with Mark Neveldine and Brian Taylor
2014	The Signal	William Eubank	Second collaboration with William Eubank
2016	The Boy	William Brent Bell	First collaboration with William Brent Bell
2019	Crypto	John Stalberg Jr.	
2020	Underwater	William Eubank	Third collaboration with William Eubank
2020	Brahms: The Boy II	William Brent Bell	Second collaboration with William Brent Bell
2021	Separation	William Brent Bell	Third collaboration with William Brent Bell
2023	Consecration	Christopher Smith	
2026	Trust Me, I'm a Doctor	Thane Economou	

Editorial department
Year	Film	Director	Role	Notes
1986	Blue Velvet	David Lynch	Apprentice editor	First collaboration with David Lynch
1987	Three for the Road	Bill L. Norton	Assistant editor	
1987	Rented Lips	Robert Downey Sr.	Additional editor	
1987	Cherry 2000	Steve De Jarnatt	Apprentice film editor	
1990	Madhouse	Tom Ropelewski	Apprentice editor	
1990	Wild at Heart	David Lynch	First assistant film editor	Second collaboration with David Lynch
1992	Noises Off	Peter Bogdanovich	Additional editor	
1992	Night and the City	Irwin Winkler	Assistant editor	First collaboration with Irwin Winkler
1993	Homeward Bound: The Incredible Journey	Duwayne Dunham	Additional editor	
1993	Heaven & Earth	Oliver Stone	Associate editor	First collaboration with Oliver Stone
1995	The Basketball Diaries	Scott Kalvert	Additional editor	
1995	The Net	Irwin Winkler	Additional editor	Second collaboration with Irwin Winkler
1997	U Turn	Oliver Stone	Additional editor	Fourth collaboration with Oliver Stone
2002	Farewell to Harry	Garrett Bennett	Additional editor	
2005	Domino	Tony Scott	Additional editor	
2017	Song to Song	Terrence Malick	Additional editor	

Additional crew
Year	Film	Director	Role	Notes
2006	The Dead Girl	Karen Moncrieff	Title designer	
2013	Devil's Pass	Renny Harlin	Title designer	Fourth collaboration with Renny Harlin

Soundtrack
Year	Film	Director	Role	Notes
1994	Natural Born Killers	Oliver Stone	Performer: "Wild Plate Rubs" Writer: "Wild Plate Rubs", "BB Tone"	Uncredited
2002	The Mothman Prophecies	Mark Pellington	Performer: "Lurid" Writer: "Lurid"	
2006	Crank	Mark Neveldine; Brian Taylor	Performer: "Satiated" Writer: "Satiated"	
2007	Cleaner	Renny Harlin	Performer: "Jim Brown" Writer: "Jim Brown"	
2011	Ghost Rider: Spirit of Vengeance	Mark Neveldine; Brian Taylor	Performer: "Fight Club" Writer: "Fight Club"	

Thanks
Year	Film	Director	Role
2004	Lenny the Wonder Dog	Oren Goldman; Stav Ozdoba	Our particular thanks to

Visual effects
Year	Film	Director	Role	Notes
2021	Isolation	Bobby Roe	Visual effects	": "Pacific Northwest" segment

Documentaries

Editor
Year	Film	Director
2022	Nuclear Now	Oliver Stone

Editorial department
Year	Film	Director	Role
2021	JFK Revisited: Through the Looking Glass	Oliver Stone	Additional editor

Shorts

Editor
Year	Film	Director
2017	Sun Up, Sun Down	Ghizlane S. Morlot

TV movies

Editor
Year	Film	Director
1995	Amanda and the Alien	Jon Kroll
1999	The Thirteenth Year	Duwayne Dunham

TV series

Editor
Year	Title	Notes
2014	Rosemary's Baby	2 episodes
2015	The Royals	1 episode
2017−19	Happy!	—N/a
2021	JFK: Destiny Betrayed	4 episodes

Editorial department
Year	Title	Role	Notes
1989−90	Twin Peaks	Assistant editor; Associate editor	2 episodes
2017	Twin Peaks	Additional editor	18 episodes
