= Separation (2021 film) =

2021 horror film

- Theatrical release poster
- Directed by: William Brent Bell
- Written by: Nick Amadeus; Josh Braun
- Produced by: Jordan Beckerman; William Brent Bell; Jesse Korman; Jordan Yale Levine; Clay Pecorin; Russ Posternak
- Starring: Rupert Friend; Mamie Gummer; Madeline Brewer; Violet McGraw; Simon Quarterman; Brian Cox
- Cinematography: Karl Walter Lindenlaub
- Edited by: Brian Berdan
- Music by: Brett Detar
- Production companies: RainMaker Films; Yale Productions
- Distributed by: Open Road Films; Briarcliff Entertainment
- Release date: April 30, 2021
- Running time: 107 minutes
- Country: United States
- Language: English
- Box office: $4.5 million

Separation is a 2021 American supernatural horror film directed by William Brent Bell, from a screenplay by Nick Amadeus and Josh Braun. It stars Rupert Friend, Mamie Gummer, Madeline Brewer, Violet McGraw, Simon Quarterman, and Brian Cox. The film follows a father who must take care of his daughter after his wife, who filed for divorce, suddenly dies in an accident, as the two become haunted by a mysterious entity.

Separation was released on April 30, 2021, by Open Road Films and Briarcliff Entertainment. It received mainly negative reviews from critics.

== Plot ==
Illustrator Jeff Vahn is divorced from his wife Maggie, who also fights for sole custody of their daughter Jenny. Failing at his career and distraught at the possibility of losing Jenny, Jeff argues over the phone with Maggie, who is then killed in a hit and run.

After Maggie's funeral, her father Paul Rivers prepares to sue Jeff for custody of Jenny, who reverts to a state of depression and begins acting strangely. Unable to successfully comfort or help her, Jeff reaches out to an old friend for a small job opportunity at a comic book company. Jenny's babysitter, Samantha Nally, begins watching her full-time as Jeff starts his new job.

It becomes apparent that Jeff's house is haunted. He has recurring nightmares of spirits lurking around the house and enters trances where he draws frightening creatures which the spirits bring to life. The ghosts interact with Jenny, and Jeff suspects they are being controlled by Maggie, who seeks revenge from beyond the grave.

After Jenny survives an allergic reaction to her food, Jeff decides to move upstate so she can live closer to Paul. The two men amicably resolve their custody battle, and Jeff also earns a promotion at work. However, a private investigator contacts Paul with the identity of Maggie's killer—Samantha—who then pushes Paul from the house's second story.

Jeff calls 911 for Paul, who is injured but alive. Samantha admits that she's in love with Jeff, and killed Maggie to protect him; she also poisoned Jenny's food, believing Jenny was keeping her from getting closer to Jeff. Jeff realizes Maggie's ghost truly has come back for revenge and is leading the other ghosts—however, her revenge is against Samantha, not Jeff. Maggie kills Samantha, and Jenny goes up to the attic to talk with Maggie. She slips and Jeff attempts to catch her, but they both free-fall from the attic window. Jeff and Jenny wake up uninjured on the ground and realize Maggie saved them from the fall. As Maggie's spirit finally departs, first responders arrive at the house.

== Cast ==
- Rupert Friend as Jeff Vahn
- Mamie Gummer as Maggie Vahn
- Madeline Brewer as Samantha Nally
- Brian Cox as Paul Rivers
- Violet McGraw as Jenny Vahn
- Simon Quarterman as Alan Ross
- Mark Pettograsso as Brian Cox's stunt double
- Eric Troy Miller as Connor Gibbons
- Manny Perez as Officer Pitt
- Lorrie Odom as Officer Rossi
- Lilah Shreeve as Barista
- Chelsea Debo as Cori
- Kayla Wesley as Young Jenny
- Ratnesh Dubey as Male Paramedic
- Trey Ellett as Dad
- Anna Maria Vargas as Teenage Girl

== Production ==
In October 2018, it was announced Rupert Friend would star in the film, with William Brent Bell directing from a screenplay by Nick Amadeus and Josh Braun. Bell, Jordan Yale Levine, Jordan Beckerman, Russ Posternak, Jesse Korman, Clay Pecorin, and Russell Geyser, were announced as producers under their Yale Productions and RainMaker Films banners, respectively. In November 2018, Mamie Gummer, Madeline Brewer, Brian Cox and Violet McGraw joined the cast of the film.

In early 2020, the film was in final stages of post-production.

== Release ==
In March 2021, Open Road Films and Briarcliff Entertainment acquired distribution rights to the film, and set it for an April 23, 2021, release. It was then pushed back to April 30, 2021.

== Reception ==
=== Box office ===
The film made $1.8 million from 1,751 theaters in its opening weekend, finishing fourth at the box office. It fell 40% in its second weekend to $1.1 million, finishing sixth.

=== Critical response ===
On the review aggregator website Rotten Tomatoes, 7% of 30 critics' reviews are positive, with an average rating of 4.30/10. The website's consensus reads: "A lifeless divorce drama cosplaying as a horror film, Separation is a disjointed mess that fails to escape its formulaic trappings." Audiences surveyed by PostTrak gave the film a 42% positive score, with 27% saying they would definitely recommend it.

Nick Schager of Variety called the film's story "a dull and misogynistic affair that imagines multiple types of women as malevolent fiends who terrorize supposedly sympathetic men", and criticized its script and performances. Frank Scheck of The Hollywood Reporter wrote that the film "attempts to inject scares into a Kramer vs. Kramer-inspired scenario", but "squanders its intriguing setup and terrific performances by devolving into familiar genre tropes." A. A. Dowd of The A.V. Club gave the film a D grade, writing: "this bargain-basement thriller approaches both its jack-in-the-box scares and its domestic scenario with the negligence of an unfit parent; it will spook neither the superstitious nor the matrimonially anxious." Brian Tallerico of RogerEbert.com gave the film 0/4 stars, calling it "a movie that fails as both a domestic drama and as a horror flick" and "a viciously misogynistic film that feels like the result of a drunk guy at a bar wondering if his ex-wife is so cruel that she would haunt him from beyond the grave."
