= Jonathan Murphy (actor) =

American actor (born 1981)

- Born: Jonathan Michael Murphy; August 3, 1981 (age 45); Arlington, Texas
- Occupations: Film, television actor

Jonathan Michael Murphy (born August 3, 1981) is an American actor, producer, and screenwriter.

== Early life and education ==
Born and raised in Arlington, Texas, Murphy began acting in high school theater productions before moving on to community theater after graduating from Texas Christian University.

== Career ==
Murphy appeared in the ABC television series October Road as Ronnie Garrett and joined the cast of the ABC Family series Wildfire as Calvin Handley in season four. Murphy was cast as Chris Skelton in the short-lived American version of Life On Mars opposite Harvey Keitel and Jason O'Mara. He also appeared in a season three episode of Ghost Whisperer (3x15).

== Filmography ==
=== Film ===
Year	Title	Role	Notes
2003	Scarecrow Slayer	Jobin	
2006	Mini's First Time	Jason	
2008	Broken Windows	Nate	
2009	Ready or Not	Dean	
2019	Animal Among Us	The Reporter	

=== Television ===
Year	Title	Role	Notes
2002	The Bold and the Beautiful	Messenger	2 episodes
2003	American Dreams	Student	Episode: "Crossing the Line"
2003	Without a Trace	Ethan Sawyer	Episode: "Sons and Daughters"
2004	The Trail to Hope Rose	Jack Lester	Television film
2004	Judging Amy	Martin Carroll	Episode: "Legacy"
2005	Crossing Jordan	Joey Campbell	Episode: "Embraceable You"
2005	The Comeback	Kevin the P.A.	Episode: "Valerie Saves the Show"
2005	Cold Case	Angus	Episode: "Bad Night"
2007–2008	October Road	Ronnie Garrett	18 episodes
2008	Ghost Whisperer	Toby Bates	Episode: "Horror Show"
2008	Wildfire	Calvin Handley	5 episodes
2008–2009	Life on Mars	Chris Skelton	17 episodes
2010	House	Cotter Macklin	Episode: "The Choice"
2013	NCIS: Los Angeles	Ian Bruckhurst	Episode: "Paper Soldiers"
2016	The Stalker Experiment	Man Two	TV Mini Series

=== Video games ===
Year	Title	Role	Notes
2016	Mafia III	Jesse	
