= Lord of Misrule (film) =

- Theatrical release poster
- Directed by: William Brent Bell
- Screenplay by: Tom de Ville
- Produced by: Deepak Nayar; Nik Bower; Jason Newmark; Laurie Cooke; William Brent Bell; James Tomlinson; Alison Brister
- Starring: Tuppence Middleton; Ralph Ineson; Evie Templeton; Matt Stokoe
- Cinematography: Simon Rowling
- Edited by: Andrew Leven
- Music by: Brett Detar
- Production companies: Riverstone Pictures; The Machine Room; Bigscope Films; REP Productions 12
- Distributed by: Magnet Releasing
- Release date: 8 January 2024 (UK)
- Running time: 104 minutes
- Countries: United Kingdom; Ireland

Lord of Misrule is a 2024 British folk horror film directed and co-produced by William Brent Bell and written by Tom de Ville. Starring Tuppence Middleton, Ralph Ineson, Evie Templeton, and Matt Stokoe, the film follows a young mother, the town's new minister, as she is in a desperate search for her missing young daughter.

Lord of Misrule was released by Magnolia Pictures and Magnet Releasing in select theatres, digital, and streaming on 8 January 2024. The film received mixed reviews from critics.

== Plot ==
Rebecca Holland has recently taken a job as the vicar of the parish church of Berrow, a rural English village. After attending a village harvest festival at which her daughter Grace is chosen as the 'Harvest Angel', Grace goes missing. Villagers and the police search for her, but the traditions in the village surrounding the god Gallowgog begin to cause suspicion.

== Cast ==
- Tuppence Middleton as Rebecca Holland
- Matt Stokoe as Henry Holland
- Evie Templeton as Grace Holland
- Ralph Ineson as Jocelyn Abney
- Alexa Goodall as Bryony Furleigh
- Anton Valensi as George Furleigh
- Rosalind March as Miri Tremlow
- Jane Wood as Ida Tremlow
- Sally Plumb as Marjorie Garfoot
- David Langham as DI Hythe
- Robert Goodman as Graham Nash

== Production ==
Filming took place in Aldbury, Hertfordshire, starting in October 2021. The film was developed by Bankside Films, with UK rights sold to Signature Entertainment in 2023.

== Release ==
Lord of Misrule was released by Magnolia Pictures and Magnet Releasing in select theatres, digital, and streaming via Hulu. The film was released digitally on 8 January 2024.

== Reception ==
=== Critical response ===
Lord of Misrule was included on the Hollywood Reporter list of "Best Horror Films of 2023." On the review aggregator website Rotten Tomatoes, 63% of 19 critics' reviews are positive, with an average rating of 5.5/10. Metacritic, which uses a weighted average, assigned the film a score of 46 out of 100, based on 5 critics, indicating "mixed or average" reviews.

Leslie Felperin, in The Guardian, awarded it two stars, calling it "a poor man's reworking" of The Wicker Man. Alan Jacques, for the Limerick Post, awarded three stars, describing the film as having "heaps of unfulfilled potential. Palpable atmosphere and compelling drama are often lost in a muddle of cliches and shiftless theatrics. Overall though, the absorbing twist at the end more than makes up for many of its inadequacies." Meagan Navarro, for Bloody Disgusting, wrote that the film "can't fully escape the trappings established by quintessential folk horror films like The Wicker Man", but "is carried by the strength of its intriguing mythology and stunning production value". Daniel Akinbola, for Filmhounds, gave it three stars, stating that it "doesn't do anything innovative", but "is a solid folk horror with a few stand out moments and solid performances".
