= Karl Walter Lindenlaub =

German cinematographer

- Born: 19 June 1957 (age 69); Bremen, West Germany
- Years active: 1980–present

Karl Walter Lindenlaub, ASC, BVK (born 19 June 1957) is a German cinematographer.

He has been nominated for a Primetime Emmy Award for his work on the miniseries two-part miniseries Houdini.

== Filmography ==
=== Film ===
Year	Title	Director
1983	Tango im Bauch	Ute Wieland
1983	Alleingang	Egon Werdin
1985	Lebe kreuz und sterbe quer	Douglas Wolfsperger
1987	Hollywood-Monster	Roland Emmerich
1988	Im Jahr der Schildkröte	Ute Wieland
1990	Moon 44	Roland Emmerich
1991	Eye of the Storm	Yuri Zeltser
1991	Das tätowierte Herz	Ernst Josef Lauscher
1992	Universal Soldier	Roland Emmerich
1993	CB4	Tamra Davis
1994	Stargate	Roland Emmerich
1995	Rob Roy	Michael Caton-Jones
1995	Last of the Dogmen	Tab Murphy
1996	Up Close & Personal	Jon Avnet
1996	Independence Day	Roland Emmerich
1997	Red Corner	Jon Avnet
1997	The Jackal	Michael Caton-Jones
1999	The Haunting	Jan de Bont
2000	Isn't She Great	Andrew Bergman
2001	One Night at McCool's	Harald Zwart
2001	The Princess Diaries	Garry Marshall
2002	City by the Sea	Michael Caton-Jones
2002	The Banger Sisters	Bob Dolman
2002	Maid in Manhattan	Wayne Wang
2005	Because of Winn-Dixie	Wayne Wang
2005	Guess Who	Kevin Rodney Sullivan
2006	Black Book	Paul Verhoeven
2007	Georgia Rule	Garry Marshall
2008	The Chronicles of Narnia: Prince Caspian	Andrew Adamson
2009	Ninja Assassin	James McTeigue
2011	Kill the Irishman	Jonathan Hensleigh
2011	Dolphin Tale	Charles Martin Smith
2014	The Identical	Dustin Marcellino
2016	Nine Lives	Barry Sonnenfeld
2016	Underworld: Blood Wars	Anna Foerster
2017	Revolt	Joe Miale
2018	Driven	Nick Hamm
2020	Brahms: The Boy II	William Brent Bell
2021	Separation	William Brent Bell
2025	Amrum	Fatih Akin

Documentary film

Year	Title	Director	Notes
1992	Celibidache	Jan Schmidt-Garre	With Diethard Prengel

=== Television ===
TV movies

Year	Title	Director	Notes
1980	Altosax	Thomas Merker	
1993	Casualties of Love: The "Long Island Lolita" Story	John Herzfeld	
1993	Polski Crash	Kaspar Heidelbach	
2013	Call Me Crazy: A Five Film	Ashley Judd	Segment "Maggie"
2014	Dead Boss	Barry Sonnenfeld	

TV series

Year	Title	Director	Notes
1987	Hafendetektiv	Peter Fratzscher	Episode "Die marokkanischen Brüder"
1988	Büro, Büro	Markus Bräutigam	3 episodes
1991	Leo und Charlotte	Kaspar Heidelbach	
2013	Beverly Hills Cop	Barry Sonnenfeld	Unaired pilot
2014	Houdini	Uli Edel	Miniseries
2016-2017	Suits		14 episodes
2020	Cosmos: Possible Worlds	Ann Druyan; Brannon Braga	All 13 episodes
2022	Halo	Otto Bathurst; Jonathan Liebesman	6 episodes
2023-2026	For All Mankind	Dan Liu; Maja Vrvilo; Sarah Boyd	5 episodes
