= Alexa Goodall =

- Goodall in 2025.
- Born: 2012 (age 13–14); Harrogate, England
- Occupation: Actor
- Years active: 2022–present

Alexa Goodall (born 2012, Harrogate) is a British child actor known for appearing as the title character in the 2025 film Momo. In October 2026, she played AJ in Ghosts: The Possession of the Button House, the film-continuation of the BBC sitcom Ghosts.

== Filmography ==
=== Film ===
Year	Title	Role	Notes
2024	Lord of Misrule	Bryony Furleigh	
2024	Robin and the Hoods	Knight 1	
2025	Momo	Momo	Title role
2026	Ghosts: The Possession of Button House	AJ	

=== Television ===
Year	Title	Role	Notes
2022	The Devil's Hour	Evelyn Wiseman	1 episode
2023	Lockwood & Co.	Canary	1 episode
2023	The Long Shadow	Sonia McCann	1 episode
2024	A Gentleman in Moscow	Nina Kulikova	4 episodes
