= Maria Kalinina =

Russian model (born 1971)

Maria "Masha" Fedorovna Kalinina
- Мария Фёдоровна Калинина
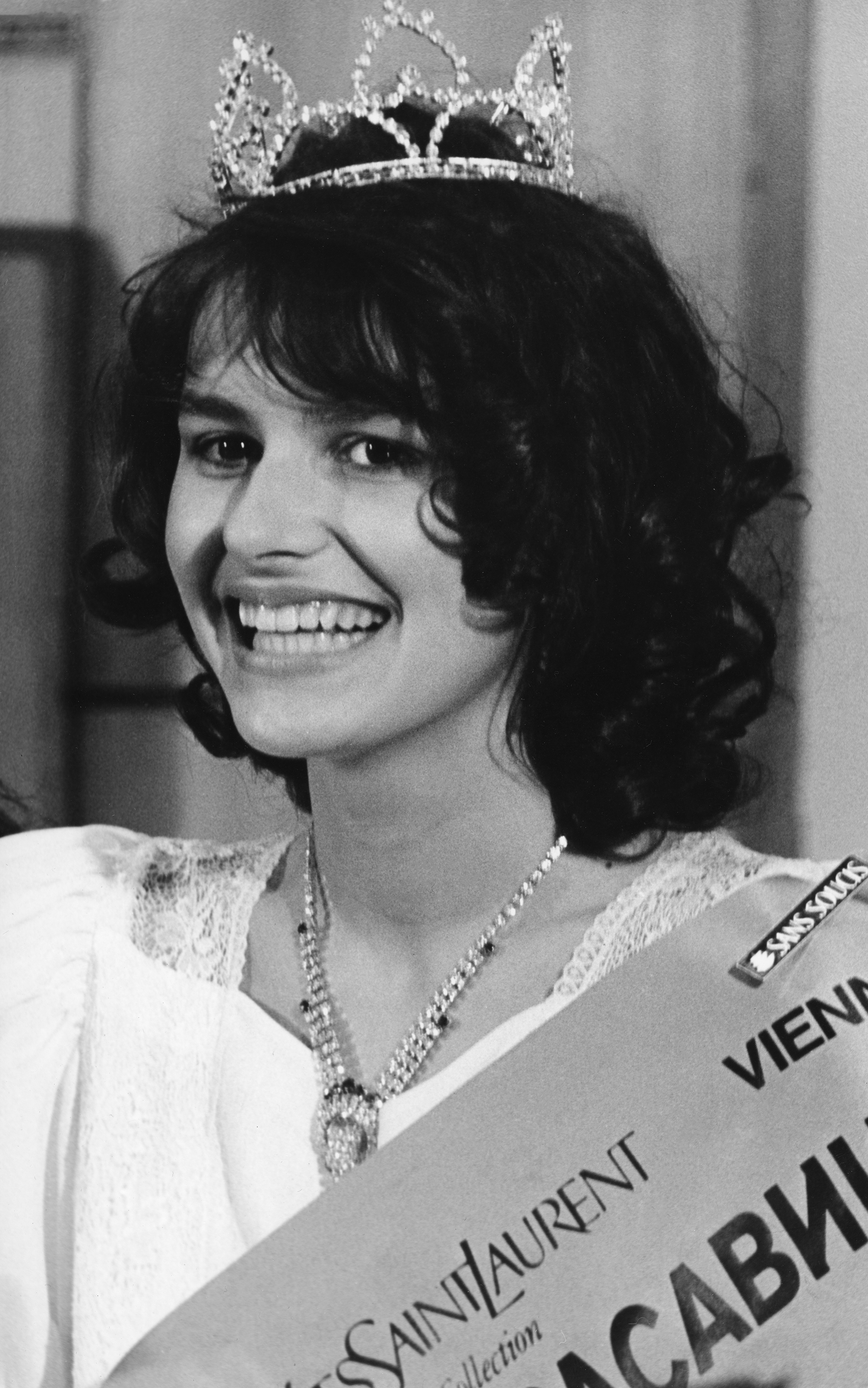
- Kalinina winning Moscow Beauty '88
- Born: 1971 (age 54–55); Moscow, Russian SFSR, Soviet Union
- Occupations: Model, actress, yoga instructor
- Known for: Winner of Moscow Beauty '88 pageant
- Spouse: Valery Sigal (m. 2012)
- Modeling information
- Height: 176 cm (5 ft 9 1/2 in)

Maria "Masha" Fedorovna Kalinina (Russian: Мария Фёдоровна Калинина, born 1971) is a Russian-American model, actress, and yoga instructor.

At the age of 16, Kalinina became famous for winning "Moscow Beauty (Russian: Московская красавица)", often called "Miss Moscow", the first beauty contest held in the capital of the Soviet Union. After winning, she toured Europe, modeling, appearing on television, recording a French language record, and playing in an Italian film. In 1990, Kalinina moved to the United States, where she became an actress in minor roles, and married a fellow emigrant. Her role as the villainess in the 2006 horror film Stay Alive affected her enough that she gave up dark roles and became a vegetarian and a yoga instructor; she taught yoga classes in the US, Russia, and internationally.

== Early life ==
Maria "Masha" Fedorovna Kalinina was born in Moscow, in September 1971. She was an only child, her father was a doctor and her mother a hotel administrator at Intourist. On her father's side she is a descendant of politician and diplomat Prince Boris Alekseevich Kurakin via Prince Fiodor Alekseevich Kurakin, and on her mother's side from Tyumen merchant Vasily Sobennikov and vice admiral and explorer Vasily Golovnin.

Kalinina first modeled at the age of 14, for advertising posters and calendars. She says she applied to model for Vyacheslav Zaitsev, but was turned down for being too short, 176 cm (5 ft 9 1/2 in), when he wanted 180 cm (5 ft 11 in).

== Moscow Beauty '88 ==
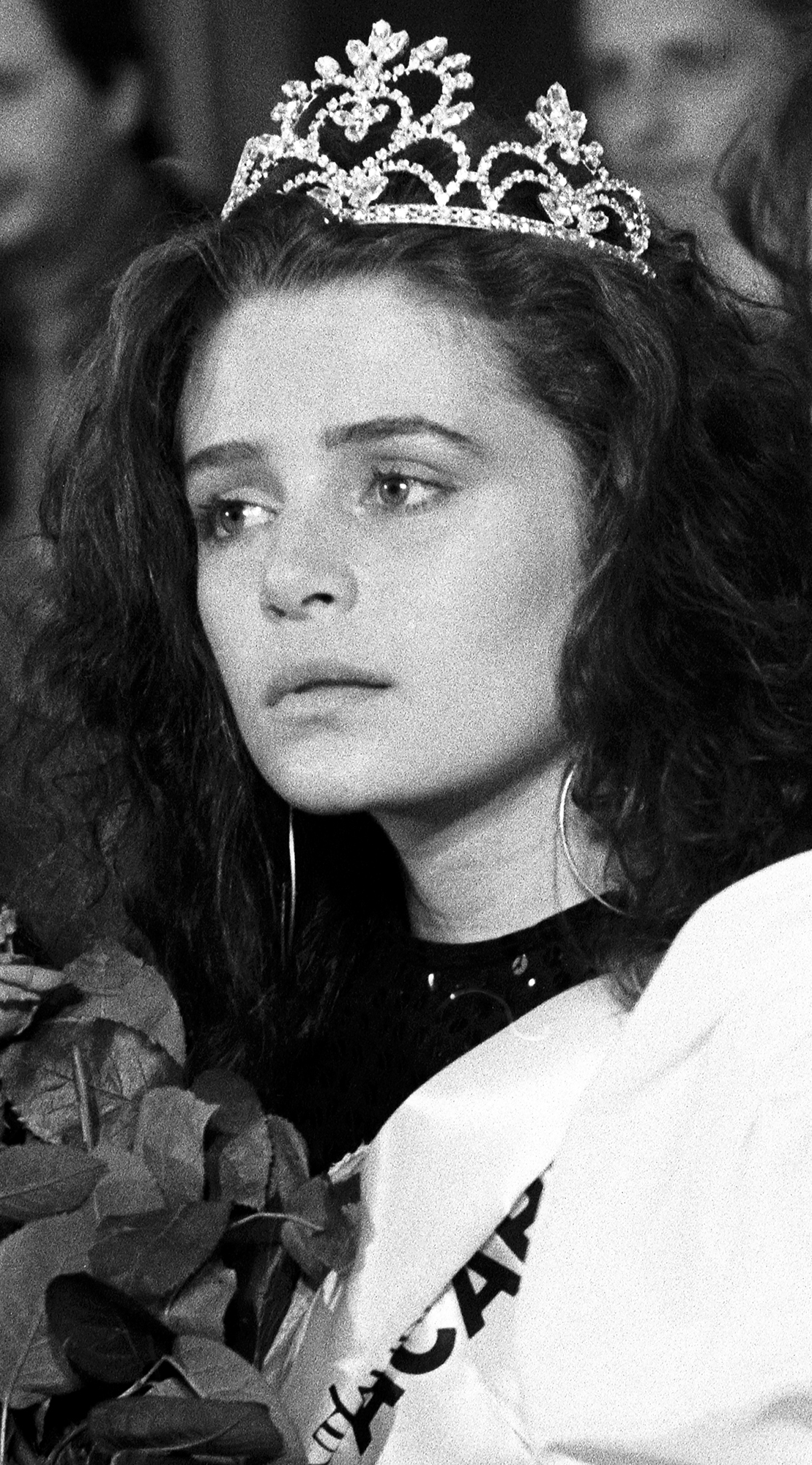
Runner-up Oksana Fandera at the Moscow Beauty '88 contest

The Perestroika liberalization movement within the Soviet Union of the late 1980s allowed the country's first beauty pageants. "Miss Irkutsk" and "Miss Odessa" were held in 1987, "Vilnius Beauty" and "Miss Riga" in the spring of 1988. However, the Moscow contest, "Moscow Beauty (Russian: Московская красавица) 1988", colloquially referred to as "Miss Moscow", attracted the most attention, and would at times later be referred to as the Soviet Union's first official beauty pageant. It was organized by the Soviet newspaper Moskovskij Komsomolets and German fashion magazine Burda Moden. Months before the contest, thousands of applicants stretched in a queue from the Park Kultury metro station to the Gorky Park administrative building where the selection of the contestants was held.

The final judging was a three-day event, held at the Luzhniki Palace of Sports, from June 10 through 12, with 12,000 spectators attending in person, and millions more watching via television. 12 judges included musician Muslim Magomayev, actress Anastasiya Vertinskaya, and author Yuri Polyakov; comedy was provided by Mikhail Zadornov. Changing rooms for contestants were uncomfortable, there was only cold water for washing, and announcements of who was to advance to each next round – from top 36 to top 18, and finally to top six – were made to the home telephone number of the contestants at one in the morning.

Kalinina was 16 years old, the youngest contestant of the top 36. She had yet to finish high school, her final exams were the day after the contest. Her talent demonstrations included sewing a dress in 20 minutes, and an aerobics workout; she also strutted across the stage in a Betty Boop parody, bending over and flipping up her skirt to reveal a thong bikini while saying "Whoop!".

When the contestants were reduced to six finalists, the judges reviewed their internal passports in conference. One of the finalists, Oksana Fandera, turned out to be from Odesa, so unsuitable to be the first Moscow Beauty. She later became a famed Soviet and Russian actress. Another, Elena Durneva, had an undesirable last name (Дурнева – similar to the Russian words for stupid, bad, or foolish); she also later became an actress, and a presenter on the 2×2 Russian television channel. Yet another had a husband and child. A fourth was too vampish, so not qualifying to represent the common Moscow woman. Kalinina was awarded the title for being pretty, yet typical, having an acceptable name, a sense of humor, and a winning smile.

After Kalinina won, she was showered with long-stemmed roses; the falling flowers hit her and knocked off her crown. Her prizes included a trip to Austria, a cruise on the Adriatic Sea, a television, and many cosmetics from the Soviet and Western contest sponsors. She also got a one year contract with Burda Moden, at the low salary of 110 rubles per month; Kalinina had anticipated it would be as a fashion model, but it was mainly a desk job.

== Europe ==
After winning, Kalinina wrote a book about the contest, Me, Miss Moscow: The Diary of a Beauty Queen, and traveled in Europe. The first chapters of her book were serialized in Russian magazine Студенческий меридиан (Student Meridian) under the title Из дневника королевы (From the Diary of a Queen) in early 1991. Kalinina appeared on a 1988 episode of German television show Wetten, dass..?. She modeled for French fashion designers, and voiced a French record, Fais moi l’amour (literally Make Love to Me, but usually translated Love Me), in 1989, and in 1990, she acted in an Italian comedy film, Occhio alla perestrojka (Watch out for Perestroika), and appeared on the cover of Belgian almanac Snoecks.

Also in 1989, Kalinina was photographed by Lord Patrick Lichfield for the cover of the 1990 Unipart British automotive calendar, appearing in a white fur coat and hat. She was offered 500,000 pounds or 51 million rubles to pose nude for the calendar but refused; when the calendar was printed with a similar model appearing nude inside, Kalinina sued and won an apology.

== United States ==
In the fall of 1990, Kalinina came to the United States as the guest of American businessman Paul Tatum; only as a friend, not a romantic partner. She met US president George H. W. Bush, and California US Representative Christopher Cox at a meeting of Republicans in Washington. She remained living in the US, and tried for an acting career, taking acting classes and acquiring representation by public relations firm Hill & Knowlton. Kalinina represented the Soviet Union on a special International Star Search 1991 episode of the television show Star Search. She refused offers to pose nude for magazines Penthouse and Playboy, and called a press conference to deny allegations of an affair with President of the Soviet Union Mikhail Gorbachev that were made in Bild-Zeitung, a Hamburg newspaper.

In 1996, and in 1998, she met with future US president Donald Trump, then owner of the Miss Universe beauty pageant. In 2020, Volume V of the redacted Senate Intelligence Committee report on Russian interference in the 2016 United States presidential election reported speculation that Trump had an affair with "a former Miss Moscow" in 1996, which international news sources explicitly connected with Kalinina. Kalinina, in interviews, stated that Trump had feelings for her, but denied any affair. She says he asked her to abandon her boyfriend, to which she replied that then he should leave his wife, and they parted as friends.

In 2002, Kalinina met Valery Sigal, an immigrant from Kyiv to Los Angeles, younger by three years; at first he was her fitness instructor, then they lived together for 10 years, then married.

Kalinina says she lived comfortably in the US via acting in dramatic and commercial roles, though she did not like that her dramatic roles were invariably of villains, killers, addicts, and other unbalanced people. In 2006, Kalinina appeared in what would be her largest American film role, as the villainess, the resurrected Countess Elizabeth Bathory, in the horror film Stay Alive. The film was critically panned. Kalinina herself decided not to play dark roles any more. She says that after performing killing and torture on screen, she needed to cleanse herself.

== Yoga ==
In 2006, Kalinina took up yoga and meditation, became a vegetarian, stopped wearing fur, or leather, or items made with feathers. She regularly attended a Hindu temple dedicated to Krishna, but said her study of Indian philosophy helped her understand her Christian faith, which she did not intend to give up. She began teaching yoga classes, and often visited Russia to do so. She became active in animal rights.

By 2008, Kalinina was fully a vegan, a certified Kundalini yoga instructor from the IKYTA school of Yogi Bhajan, and a member of the VITA Russian animal rights organization. In 2008, Kalinina became an honorary president of the Krasa Rossii beauty pageant, and taught yoga classes to the contestants.

Kalinina held yoga classes in Santa Monica, and Moscow, and travelling sessions in Turkey, India, and Bali.
