= Matthew Peterman =

American screenwriter and film producer (born 1975)

- Peterman in 2007
- Born: July 7, 1975 (age 50); Atlanta, Georgia, U.S.
- Occupations: Screenwriter, film producer

Matthew Peterman (born July 7, 1975) is an American screenwriter and film producer.

In 2000, along with writing partner William Brent Bell, Peterman wrote screenplay Mercury, which was bought by Universal Studios with Gale Anne Hurd and f/x studio Digital Domain producing. Since then, the duo have set up several film projects at studios including Warner Bros. and Walt Disney Studios as well as television projects at Sony, the WB and ABC.

Peterman's most recent project is as co-writer and producer of the horror thriller, Stay Alive and the found footage supernatural horror, The Devil Inside. Stay Alive was acquired and distributed domestically by Buena Vista Pictures and internationally by Universal Pictures.

== Filmography ==
Producer:

- Stay Alive (2006)
- The Devil Inside (2012)

Writer:

- Stay Alive (2006) (written by)
- The Devil Inside (2012) (written by)
- Wer (2013)
