= Simon Quarterman =

English actor and producer (born 1977)

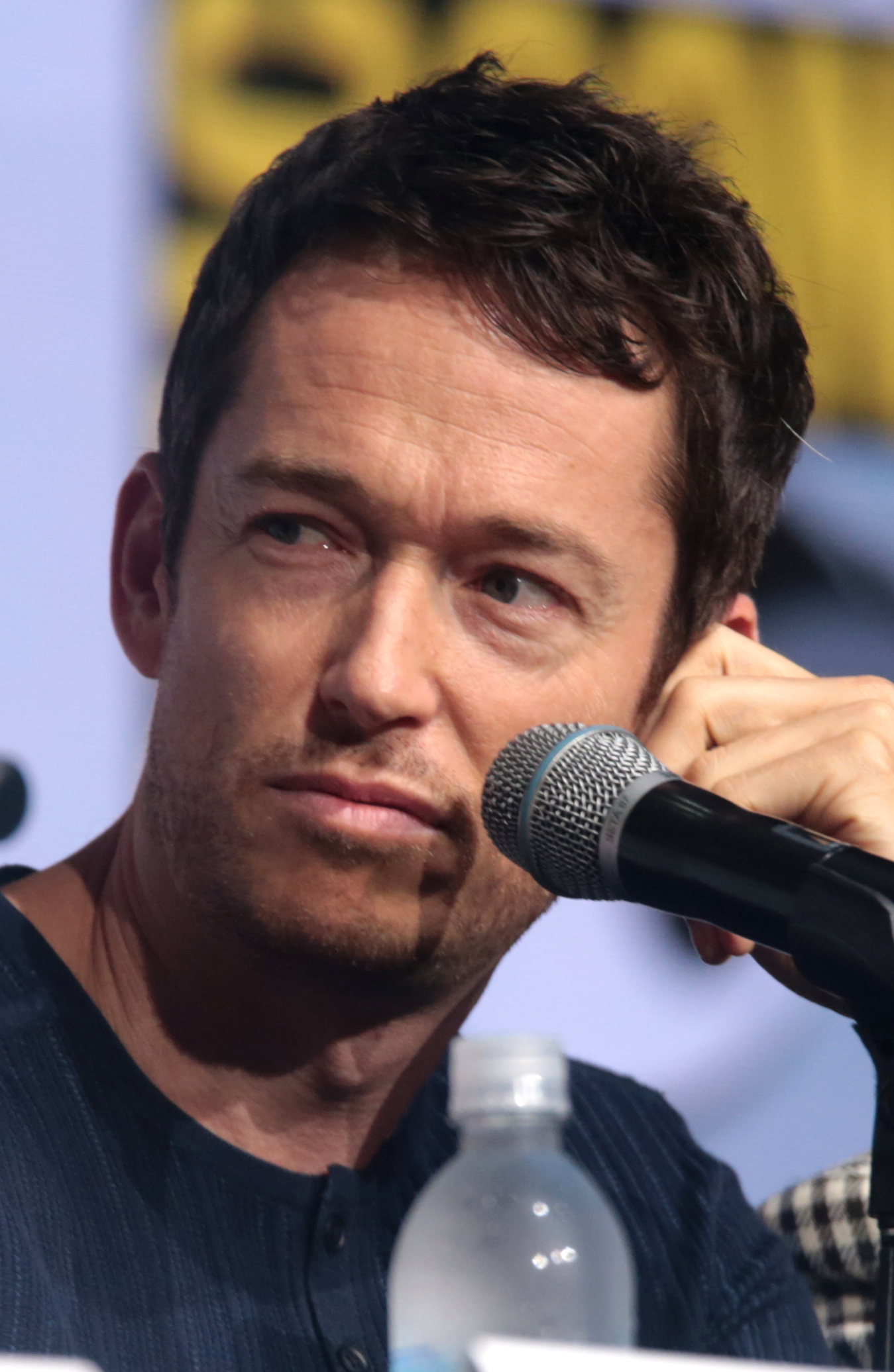
- Quarterman at the 2017 San Diego Comic-Con promoting Westworld
- Born: 14 November 1977 (age 48)
- Occupation: Actor
- Years active: 2000–present

Simon Quarterman (born 14 November 1977) is an English actor and producer, best known for playing narrative director Lee Sizemore in the HBO science fiction drama Westworld. He also portrays Father Ben Rawlings in the supernatural horror film The Devil Inside (2012). He appeared in director William Brent Bell's horror film Wer.

== Career ==
Quarterman also played the role of Ari in The Scorpion King 2: Rise of a Warrior.

He has appeared in several British television shows, including Down to Earth, Midsomer Murders, Holby City, and EastEnders, playing Paul Jenkins, and the miniseries Victoria & Albert.

He portrayed Lee Sizemore in the HBO science fiction Western TV show Westworld.

== Filmography ==
Film roles
| Year | Title | Role | Notes |
|---|---|---|---|
| 2007 | Inside | Beck | Short film |
| 2008 | The Scorpion King 2: Rise of a Warrior | Ari | Direct-to-Video |
| 2012 | The Devil Inside | Father Ben Rawlings | |
| 2013 | Wer | Gavin Flemyng | |
| 2014 | The Glamour of it All | Simon | Short film |
| 2015 | Estranged | Callum | |
| 2017 | Negative | Hollis | |
| 2021 | Violet | Martin | |
| 2021 | Separation | Alan Ross | |

Television roles
| Year | Title | Role | Notes |
|---|---|---|---|
| 1999 | Holby City | Joe Peters | Episode: "Tidings of Comfort and Joy" |
| 2000 | Down to Earth | Duncan | 2 episodes |
| 2000 | The Sleeper | PC Browning | Miniseries |
| 2000 | Lorna Doone | Soldier at Sedgemoor | TV movie |
| 2001 | Perfect Strangers | Young Waiter | Miniseries |
| 2001 | Victoria & Albert | Young Prince Albert Edward | TV movie |
| 2001 | Midsomer Murders | Young Christian Aubrey | Episode: "The Electric Vendetta" |
| 2001 | Murder Rooms: Mysteries of the Real Sherlock Holmes | Baynes | Episode: "The Patient's Eyes" |
| 2001 | Swallow | Monitoring Staff | Miniseries |
| 2006 | Holby City | Zack Nash | 2 episodes |
| 2006 | Simon Schama's Power of Art | Young Simon | Episode: "Rothko" |
| 2007 | EastEnders | Jenkins | 1 episode |
| 2007 | The Whistleblowers | Clerk | Episode: "Environment" |
| 2015 | Stitchers | Dr. Sebastian Zuber | Episode: "Finally" |
| 2016–2020 | Westworld | Lee Sizemore | Main cast |

Video Game roles
| Year | Title | Role | Notes |
|---|---|---|---|
| 2021 | Call of Duty: Vanguard | Sgt. Richard Webb | Voice, likeness and motion capture |
