= Brahms: The Boy II =

2020 film by William Brent Bell

- Theatrical release poster
- Directed by: William Brent Bell
- Written by: Stacey Menear
- Based on: Characters by Stacey Menear
- Produced by: Matt Berenson; Gary Lucchesi; Tom Rosenberg; Jim Wedaa; Eric Reid; Roy Lee; Richard S. Wright
- Starring: Katie Holmes; Ralph Ineson; Owain Yeoman; Christopher Convery
- Cinematography: Karl Walter Lindenlaub
- Edited by: Brian Berdan
- Music by: Brett Detar
- Production companies: Lakeshore Entertainment; STXfilms
- Distributed by: STX Entertainment
- Release date: February 21, 2020
- Running time: 86 minutes
- Country: United States
- Language: English
- Budget: $10 million
- Box office: $20.3 million

Brahms: The Boy II is a 2020 American supernatural horror film starring Katie Holmes, Ralph Ineson, Christopher Convery and Owain Yeoman. A sequel to the 2016 film The Boy, it is directed by William Brent Bell and written by Stacey Menear, the respective director and writer of the original film.

Brahms: The Boy II follows a young boy who, after moving into a mansion with his parents following a traumatizing incident at his previous home, finds a lifelike porcelain doll that he becomes attached to. The film was released in the United States by STX Entertainment on February 21, 2020, and was panned by critics, many of whom deemed it inferior to its predecessor. The film was also a financial disappointment, grossing $20.3 million worldwide against a budget of $10 million plus advertising costs, less than a third of the first film's gross. It was also Lakeshore Entertainment's last film before they were shut down.

== Plot ==
After a traumatic home invasion, Liza and her son Jude are left deeply shaken. Jude becomes mute, and Liza suffers from nightmares. To heal, they move to a remote estate with Sean, who is Liza’s husband and Jude's father. While exploring the woods, Jude finds a buried doll called Brahms, which he becomes unnervingly attached to. Soon, strange events begin happening in the house, with Brahms seemingly influencing Jude’s behavior. Jude, who has been silent since the attack, starts speaking again, but only when he is alone with Brahms. Liza notices increasingly disturbing signs, including Jude writing new rules for Brahms, as well as drawings that suggest violent tendencies.

Liza grows more unsettled, especially after a violent accident involving a visiting cousin, Will, which seems to have been caused by Brahms. Despite her concerns, Sean and their therapist believe that Brahms is helping Jude cope with his trauma. Liza’s suspicions deepen when she learns about the mansion’s dark history and the previous family’s suicide. She also finds even more disturbing notes, indicating that Brahms wants to harm her and Sean.

One night, Joseph, the mansion's groundskeeper, breaks in and intends to harm Liza, claiming that Brahms "called" to him and revealing how the doll has influenced the actions of its previous owners. Shortly afterwards, Jude dons a mask resembling the doll and prepares to attack Liza. Sean intervenes, smashing the doll with a mallet, which interrupts its possession of Jude. To their horror, Brahms’ head shatters, revealing a grotesque demonic entity inside. A fiery explosion kills Joseph, and the family believes that they have destroyed Brahms for good after Jude tosses the doll into the fire.

The family returns to their old home, thinking the nightmare is over. However, Jude still keeps the mask and continues to speak to it, suggesting that Brahms still has control over him.

== Cast ==
- Katie Holmes as Liza
- Owain Yeoman as Sean
- Christopher Convery as Jude
- Ralph Ineson as Joseph
- Anjali Jay as Dr. Lawrence
- Oliver Rice as Liam
- Natalie Moon as Pamela
- Daphne Hoskins as Sophie
- Joely Collins as Mary

== Production ==
By October 2018, it was announced that a sequel was in development, with Katie Holmes joining the cast of the film, William Brent Bell returning to direct and Stacey Menear back to write the script of the film, respectively, with Matt Berenson, Gary Lucchesi, Tom Rosenberg, Jim Wedaa and Eric Reid serving as producers, under their Lakeshore Entertainment banners, and STX Entertainment producing and distributing the film.

In November 2018, Christopher Convery, Ralph Ineson and Owain Yeoman also joined the cast of the film.

Principal photography began in January 2019 and wrapped that March. Parts of the sequel were filmed in Victoria on Vancouver Island, located in British Columbia, Canada.

== Release ==
The film was theatrically released in the United States on February 21, 2020. It was previously scheduled for July 26, 2019, and then December 6, 2019.

== Reception ==
=== Box office ===
Brahms: The Boy II grossed $12.6 million in the United States and Canada, and $7.7 million in other territories, for a worldwide total of $20.3 million, against a production budget of $10 million.

In the United States and Canada, the film was released alongside The Call of the Wild and Impractical Jokers: The Movie as well as the wide expansion of The Lodge, and was projected to gross $5–8 million from 2,151 theaters in its opening weekend. The film made $2.2 million on its first day, including $375,000 from Thursday night previews. It went on to debut to $5.7 million, finishing fifth at the box office. In its second weekend the film dropped 55% to $2.6 million, finishing sixth.

=== Critical response ===
On Rotten Tomatoes, the film holds an approval rating of 11% based on 56 reviews, with an average rating of 3.7/10. The site's critics consensus reads: "More likely to induce boredom than quicken the pulse, Brahms: The Boy II is chiefly scary for the way it undermines the effectiveness of its above-average predecessor." On Metacritic, the film has a weighted average score of 29 out of 100, based on 13 critics, indicating "generally unfavorable" reviews. Audiences polled by CinemaScore gave the film an average grade of "C−" on an A+ to F scale, and PostTrak reported it received an average 1 out of 5 stars from viewers they polled, with 24% of people saying they would definitely recommend it.

Benjamin Lee, writing for The Guardian, gave the film one star out of five, describing it as "so punishingly dull to watch, filled with dry, perfunctory dialogue from Stacey Menear's consistently uninventive script and shot without even a glimmer of style," adding that "even at a brisk 86 minutes, it feels like unending torture..." with a finale "that buckles under the weight of its own stupidity, as well as some god-awful CGI."

=== Accolades ===
Katie Holmes was nominated at the Golden Raspberry Awards as Worst Actress (for her appearance in this movie and also in The Secret: Dare to Dream).

== Possible sequel ==
In August 2022, Bell stated he has plans for a third installment. The filmmaker stated that his intentions are to round out the character of Brahms, with the completion of a trilogy. While the second film centered around the porcelain doll "Brahms", the potential next movie would once again continue the story of the character from the original release. Later that month, Bell expounded on his ideas for potential future installments including a sequel and possible prequel options. When discussing the future of the series, the filmmaker stated that had Jason Blum collaborated on the movies, the third installment would have been released by the time the second was. Bell continued that the next movie will reveal that Brahms Heelshire survived the events at the end of the first installment, and that it will reveal what he has been up to; while expressing plans for the character and his doll counterpart to appear in the film. He stated: "...there's a lot of great stories and there's prequels. ...[It's a] rich world that lends itself to a lot."
