= Wer (film) =

2013 American horror film

- Theatrical release poster
- Directed by: William Brent Bell
- Written by: William Brent Bell; Matthew Peterman
- Produced by: Matthew Peterman; Morris Paulson; Steven Schneider
- Starring: A.J. Cook; Brian Scott O'Connor; Simon Quarterman; Sebastian Roché; Vik Sahay
- Cinematography: Alejandro Martínez
- Edited by: William Brent Bell; Tim Mirkovich
- Music by: Brett Detar
- Production companies: Sierra Pictures; Incentive Filmed Entertainment; Prototype; Room 101, Inc.
- Distributed by: Focus World
- Release dates: November 16, 2013 (Japan); September 23, 2014 (United States)
- Running time: 93 minutes
- Country: United States
- Language: English

Wer is a 2013 American horror film directed by William Brent Bell and starring A.J. Cook as a defense attorney who discovers that her client is a werewolf. The film was released in Japan on November 16, 2013, and was released to VOD in the United States in August 2014.

== Plot ==
French police, led by Captain Klaus Pistor, question Claire Porter as she recovers in a hospital bed. American tourists vacationing in France, Claire’s husband Henry and son Peter were viciously mauled to death in a savage attack by an unknown beast. When Claire makes a claim that the shadowy figure resembled a man, the police arrest brutish local man Talan Gwynek for the murders. Claire later dies in the hospital from her wounds.

Expatriate attorney Katherine Samantha Moore requests to represent Talan. Fellow American Eric Sarin works as her investigator. Kate hires English animal expert Dr. Gavin Flemyng, with whom she had a romantic relationship five years earlier, to complete the defense team.

While interviewing Talan at the police station, a struggle breaks out with the authorities. Gavin is scratched by Talan while trying to shield Kate.

Kate’s team travels to Talan’s remote house in the woods to interview his mother. Mrs. Gwynek tells them that she is originally from Romania. She claims that Talan would have been too physically weak to commit the murders because he suffers from a rare genetic condition passed down through the males in their family. She also makes a claim that the police are targeting Talan because the government wants to take their land for use as a nuclear waste disposal site.

Gavin attempts to flirt with Kate, which spurs resentment from Eric. Gavin also begins feeling gradually more ill since suffering the scratch at the police station.

The defense team comes to believe that Talan may suffer from porphyria. While undergoing medical examinations in police custody, a stress test involving a strobe light causes Talan to react violently. Using apparent superhuman strength, Talan kills almost everyone in the room and escapes the building.

A citywide manhunt eventually traces Talan to an abandoned building. Talan is caught on camera transforming into a werewolf before attacking an armed assault team, falling eight stories to the ground below, and evading capture.

A second manhunt finally corners Talan after he kills several police officers. Talan is riddled with bullets and his apparently dead body is then transported in a police vehicle. Kate and Eric follow the police caravan. The van carrying Talan overturns as Talan comes back to life to continue his rampage.

Meanwhile, after becoming increasingly ill, Gavin investigates the Gwynek residence and ends up killing Mrs. Gwynek after coming to realize that he now has the same affliction as Talan. Gavin shaves off all of his body hair as he begins giving in to his new werewolf alter ego and howls at the Moon in his final form.

In the commotion at the crash site, Talan kills Eric. Talan moves to attack Kate next, but Gavin arrives to battle the other werewolf. The fight ends when Gavin strangles Talan, presumably killing him.

Kate confronts the transformed Gavin at gunpoint. Before she can shoot him, a sniper’s bullet fired by Pistor from a police helicopter hits Kate in the gut. Gavin goes into a fit of rage, throwing an assault team member’s body into the helicopter and causing it to crash into a ditch and killing Pistor.

News footage in the aftermath reveals that Kate survived. Pistor is implicated in a conspiracy that killed Talan’s father George to take the Gwynek’s land. Talan Gwynek's body was never recovered, and he remains at large and is assumed to be responsible for the continued killings, meanwhile Gavin’s true identity as a werewolf remains a secret and Gavin says that Talan is a werewolf.

== Cast ==
- A. J. Cook as Kate Moore
- Vik Sahay as Eric Sarin
- Simon Quarterman as Gavin Flemyng
- Sebastian Roché as Klaus Pistor
- Brian Scott O'Connor as Talan Gwynek
- Stephanie Lemelin as Claire Porter
- Oaklee Pendergast as Peter Porter
- Angelina Armani as Claire's Sister
- Brian Johnson as Henry Porter
- Collin Blair as British Reporter (as Collin Jay Blair)
- Corneliu Ulici as Police Officer

== Production ==
Plans for Wer were initially announced in January 2012 during an interview with Dread Central, when Bell and producer Matthew Peterman said they had been working on a werewolf-themed project for the past 10 months. The two initially planned to begin production on the film, a "faux-documentary style project," in Romania during April 2012.

In March 2012, Cook was confirmed as the lead heroine of Wer, and Rob Hall's Almost Human, Inc company was recruited to create the movie's special effects. Later that same year, Vik Sahay and Sebastian Roché were also attached to the project. Sahay initially debated whether or not to take the role of Eric Sarin due to a busy schedule, but ultimately decided to join because the character and the movie's world "were just too interesting to walk away from".

Filming for Wer began in May 2012 in Bucharest, Romania, and Bell shot the movie concurrently with another project, The Vatican. A trailer for Wer was released in October 2013.

== Reception ==
Jon Dickinson of Scream praised the film's acting — in particular O'Connor's (Talan), and with the exception of Cook's (Kate) —, police thriller atmosphere and realistic take on lycanthropy, while criticizing its "choppy" CGI effects, poor camera work on action scenes, and "generic third act."
