= Ready or Not (2009 film) =

- Theatrical poster
- Directed by: Sean Doyle
- Screenplay by: Sean Doyle; Travis Kurtz
- Produced by: Minor Childers; Sean Doyle
- Starring: Christian Oliver; Seamus Dever; Evan Helmuth; Jonathan Murphy; Alex Rocco; Fernanda Romero
- Cinematography: Anton Klima
- Edited by: Lucas Spaulding
- Music by: Erik Godal
- Release dates: January 1, 2009; March 24, 2009 (DVD)
- Running time: 88 minutes
- Country: United States
- Language: English

Ready or Not is a 2009 independent American comedy film directed by Sean Doyle and written by Doyle and Travis Kurtz. The film stars Christian Oliver, Seamus Dever, Evan Helmuth, and Jonathan Murphy as four college friends who become stranded in Mexico during a bachelor party, leading to a series of misadventures.

== Plot ==
Four college friends, led by best man Marc, attend a bachelor party in Las Vegas for Chris, who is getting married in six days. Marc convinces them to extend the celebration by taking a plane to Mexico, where they become stranded. Now they must get back to the United States in time for Chris' wedding.

== Cast ==
- Christian Oliver as Chris
- Seamus Dever as Marc
- Evan Helmuth as Lawrence
- Jonathan Murphy as Dean
- Alex Rocco as Don Julio
- Fernanda Romero as Puri
- Marco Rodríguez as Pedro
- Jordi Vilasuso as El Solo, the matador
- Andrea Bogart as Kelly, Chris' fiancée
- Ray Santiago as Nacho
