= Stay Alive =

2006 horror film

- Theatrical release poster
- Directed by: William Brent Bell
- Written by: William Brent Bell; Matthew Peterman
- Produced by: McG; Peter Schlessel; James D. Stern; Matthew Peterman
- Starring: Jon Foster; Samaire Armstrong; Frankie Muniz; Jimmi Simpson; Milo Ventimiglia; Sophia Bush; Adam Goldberg
- Cinematography: Alejandro Martinez
- Edited by: Harvey Rosenstock
- Music by: John Frizzell
- Production companies: Spyglass Entertainment; Endgame Entertainment; Wonderland Sound and Vision; Stay Alive Productions
- Distributed by: Buena Vista Pictures Distribution (Note: Distributed through the Hollywood Pictures banner.)
- Release date: March 24, 2006
- Running time: 86 minutes
- Country: United States
- Language: English
- Budget: $20 million
- Box office: $27.3 million

Stay Alive is a 2006 American supernatural techno horror film directed by William Brent Bell, who co-wrote it with Matthew Peterman. The film was produced by McG, and released on March 24, 2006, in the United States by Buena Vista Pictures Distribution to negative reviews from critics and grossed $27.3 million against a $20 million budget.

== Plot ==
After playing a video game titled Stay Alive, friends Loomis Crowley, Rex, and Sarah are killed in manners that mirror their in-game characters' deaths.

At Loomis's funeral, some of his belongings are given to his friend Hutch MacNeil—including the game. Hutch checks out the game, and is joined by his girlfriend October, Phineus (October's brother), Abigail (Sarah's friend), Swink and Hutch's boss, Miller, plays online from his office.

Stay Alive is a multiplayer survival horror set in a derelict mansion on Gerouge Plantation. The title screen shows "The Prayer of Elizabeth," a request for "all who resist" to perish so that their blood can keep Countess Bathory young. After all players recite the prayer, the game begins.

The players head toward a mausoleum and tower, fighting through a cemetery of evil ghost children and gathering items, including roses. October, an occult enthusiast, explains wild roses repel undead spirits. Miller's character is separated from the others. Since he is out of roses, the Countess, appearing as a woman in a red dress, kills the character. Shortly after, the Countess's ghost appears in Miller's office and kills him by stabbing him with conjoined scissor blades like the ones in the game.

Two detectives, Thibodeaux and King, question Hutch about the murder. Hutch learns that like Miller, Loomis and Miller also played Stay Alive and died the same way as their game characters. Researching Bathory, October learns she bathed in young women's blood to maintain her youth. Her weakness was mirrors—she could not stand seeing herself growing old.

Phineus plays alone and, despite quitting the game before his character dies, is run over by a horse-drawn carriage and killed. The survivors agree to stop playing. Ignoring Swink's warning, detective King plays until his character dies. He then heads to the local video game store to question the store clerk, but gets no answers. After leaving, King is killed in his car.

Searching Loomis's house, Hutch and Abigail discover the game developer's location: the real Gerouge Plantation. October discovers that the Countess, locked in her estate's tower for her gruesome acts, vowed to return one day. The Prayer has somehow resurrected her, allowing her to return. The Countess can only be killed by driving three nails into her body to trap her soul. Shortly after October shares her discovery, the Countess attacks her and slits her throat.

The three survivors—Hutch, Abigail and Swink—realize that once the game started, it can play by itself. They drive to Gerouge Plantation. While Swink stays in the van and plays on his laptop to distract Bathory, Hutch and Abigail search the plantation.

The Countess cheats and attempts to kill Swink in real life, despite his character being alive. Swink runs and falls into a bush of roses. Hutch and Abigail return to the van to find Swink's character dead. They take the laptop and some wild roses, which they drop to deter undead children as they move toward the tower.

In the tower, they become separated. Bathory's phantom attacks Abigail. At the top of the tower, Hutch finds the preserved body of the Countess. He hammers three nails into it, dispersing the spirits, but the body reanimates. Recalling her hatred of mirrors, Hutch uses the laptop screen to repel her and set the room on fire. Swink, still alive thanks to the rose bush, bursts in with Abigail and drags Hutch to safety. As Bathory's body burns, the three leave the tower.

Some time later, the game store sells copies of Stay Alive. Intrigued, Fidget, the store's clerk, puts a copy in a PlayStation 2. As the game's intro begins, the group reciting Elizabeth Bathory's prayer is heard as the game zooms to Bathory, staring out her window.

== Cast ==
- Jon Foster as Hutch MacNeil
- Samaire Armstrong as Abigail
- Frankie Muniz as Swink Sylvania
- Sophia Bush as October Bantum
- Jimmi Simpson as Phineus Bantum
- Wendell Pierce as Detective Waymon Thibodeaux
- Rio Hackford as Detective Charles King
- Milo Ventimiglia as Loomis Crowley
- Adam Goldberg as Miller Banks
- Maria Kalinina as Countess Elizabeth Bathory
- Billy Slaughter as Rex
- Nicole Oppermann as Sarah
- Lauren Lorbeck as Emma
- Billy Louviere as Fidget, the Video Game Store Clerk
- James Haven as Jonathan Malkus, the creator of the game (only in the Unrated Director's Cut)
- Alice Krige as the Author (only in the Unrated Director's Cut)

== Box office ==
Stay Alive was released in U.S. theaters on March 24, 2006. The film opened at #3 in the U.S. box office with $10.7 million that first weekend. It ultimately grossed a total of $23.08 million in the United States. The movie grossed a total of over $27.1 million worldwide.

== Critical reception ==
Stay Alive received negative critical reviews. Rotten Tomatoes holds this film with a 12% rating based on 58 reviews, with an average rating of 3.20/10. The site's critics consensus states: "A by-the-numbers teen horror flick, Stay Alive fails to exploit its premise for any real scares." Metacritic reported the film had an average score of 24 out of 100 based on 17 reviews. Audiences polled by CinemaScore gave the film an average grade of "C+" on an A+ to F scale.

Writing for Newsday, John Anderson commented that "'Stay Alive' spends a lot of time inside the video game system, and what will terrify the audience very early on is the realization that there's better acting in the video game than on the big screen." Meanwhile, writing for Variety, Anderson concluded: "Seldom is there anything close to real passion or panic on display here from cast members." Gregory Kirschling of Entertainment Weekly gave the film a D− and commented, "this dopey movie keeps flouting its own rules, so that one character who dies in the game gets to live, while poor suckers get offed for real even though we never saw their Game Overs." Entertainment Weekly gave the "Unrated Director's Cut" version a C+.

Despite its initial negative reception, Stay Alive has been regarded by some in the years since as a cult classic horror movie.

== Home video release ==
The DVD was released by Buena Vista Home Entertainment (under the Hollywood Pictures Home Entertainment banner) in the United States on September 19, 2006. It was made available in an unrated edition (100 minutes) and a "PG-13" edition (85 minutes). The 15 minutes of new unrated footage include a new character and subplot. The unrated edition features more adult material. As of December 2011, the total amount of DVD units sold is 874,827, bringing in $13,636,869 in revenue.

== Potential sequel ==
In August 2022, Bell revealed that developments for a potential sequel film are ongoing. The filmmaker stated that creatives "are trying very hard to make another one". In March 2026, the 20th anniversary of the film, Bell and Peterman continued to show interest in a sequel, even though they admitted that doing one now would seem unlikely. They offered an explanation for the return of Jimmi Simpson's character Phineas, "he would have been this ghost in the machine. He's fucking trapped. At the point where they reach that next level in the story, they'd find that [Phineas] has been there the whole time, and he can't leave. It'd give us more fun with Jimmi Simpson, and he'd be the mentor to the movie's new characters for a little bit."

== See also ==
- List of ghost films
- Countess Dracula (1971), film about Elizabeth Bathory
- Eternal (2004), another film inspired by Bathory
- Survival horror
- Techno-horror
