= Christopher Convery =

American actor (born 2008)

- Born: January 15, 2008 (age 18); Las Vegas, Nevada, U.S.
- Other name: Chris Convery
- Education: Professional Performing Arts School
- Occupation: Actor
- Years active: 2016–present
- Relatives: Christian Convery (cousin)

External image
- Christopher Convery IMDb photo

Christopher Convery (born January 15, 2008) is an American actor. He starred as Jude in Brahms: The Boy II. He also starred in Sony’s The Girl in the Spider's Web (2018). He starred in the Netflix series On the Verge in the role of Albert.

== Early life and career ==
Convery was born in Las Vegas, Nevada on January 15, 2008. His younger brother Sean (b. 2013) is also an actor. His family moved to New York City when he was seven years old after he landed a principal role on Broadway in Kinky Boots starring opposite Billy Porter. They lived in New York City for five years where Christopher starred in multiple films and television series. Later, they moved to Los Angeles and currently resides there. He is the cousin of actor Christian Convery.

He attends the Professional Performing Arts School in New York City. He is also a singer and a pianist. He has performed at 54 Below, Birdland and The Green Room in New York City.

Convery began his professional acting career at the age of seven on Broadway in the role of Young Charlie in Kinky Boots (2013), directed by Jerry Mitchell. Since then he has acted in various roles including Young Billy in the Netflix series Stranger Things (2019), a recurring role as Martin in Fox's TV series Gotham (2017–18) and appearances in other TV series such as MacGyver (2020), Chicago Med (2019), Succession (2018), The Blacklist: Redemption (2017), and Haters Back Off (2017). He also appeared in the 2022 drama film Prisoner's Daughter as the role of Ezra.

== Filmography ==
=== Film ===
Year	Title	Role
2018	The Girl in the Spider's Web	August Balder
2019	By Dawn	Kelan Pack
2020	Brahms: The Boy II	Jude
2022	Prisoner's Daughter	Ezra MacLeary
2022	Pinball: The Man Who Saved the Game	Seth

=== Television ===
Year	Title	Role	Notes
2017	The Blacklist: Redemption	Keaton Lang	Episode: "Hostages"
2017	Haters Back Off	Young Patrick	Episode: "my 1rst bae"
2017–18	Gotham	Martin	5 episodes
2018	Succession	Kid at Theme Park #1	Episode: "Celebration"
2019	Chicago Med	Jesse Green	Episode: "The Things We Do"
2019	Stranger Things	Young Billy Hargrove	Episode: "Chapter Six: E Pluribus Unum"
2020	MacGyver	Asher Reinman	Episode: "Kid + Plane + Cable + Truck"
2021	On the Verge	Albert	10 episodes
2022	FBI: International	Gabriel Delvina	Episode: "Snakes"

=== Theatre ===
Year	Title	Role
2016–2018	Kinky Boots	Young Charlie
