= The Devil Inside (film) =

2012 American horror film

- Theatrical release poster
- Directed by: William Brent Bell
- Written by: William Brent Bell; Matthew Peterman
- Produced by: Matthew Peterman; Morris Paulson
- Starring: Fernanda Andrade; Simon Quarterman; Evan Helmuth
- Cinematography: Gonzalo Amat
- Edited by: Timothy Mirkovich; William Brent Bell
- Music by: Brett Detar; Ben Romans
- Production companies: Insurge Pictures; Prototype
- Distributed by: Paramount Pictures
- Release date: January 6, 2012
- Running time: 83 minutes
- Country: United States
- Languages: English; German; Latin; Italian
- Budget: $1 million
- Box office: $101.8 million

The Devil Inside is a 2012 American supernatural horror film directed by William Brent Bell, who co-wrote it with Matthew Peterman and co-edited it with Timothy Mirkovich. It stars Fernanda Andrade, Simon Quarterman, and Evan Helmuth. Presented as found footage, the film follows a woman as she becomes involved in a series of exorcisms during her quest to determine what happened to her mother, who murdered three people due to demonic possession.

The Devil Inside was released by Paramount Pictures on January 6, 2012. It received universally negative reviews from both critics and audiences; its ending was singled out for mockery, with some outlets publishing articles discussing whether it is the worst ending in cinema history. Despite this, it was a commercial success, grossing $101.8 million on a $1 million budget.

== Plot ==
On October 30, 1989, Maria Rossi committed a triple murder during an exorcism performed on her. The Catholic Church became involved, and she has since been in a Catholic psychiatric hospital in Rome. Her daughter, Isabella, learned of the murders from her father, who died three days after telling her.

Twenty years later, Isabella is in the process of filming a documentary with filmmaker Michael Schaefer about exorcisms and, to find out more about her mother, she visits Maria in Rome and meets two priests, Ben Rawlings and David Keane. Maria speaks in different accents and soils herself while screaming in an unidentified language. She has inverted crosses carved into her arms and her bottom lip and tells Isabella that killing a child is against God's will. Isabella had an abortion years ago and her mother had no way of knowing that—a sign that showed possible possession. David and Ben take her on an unsanctioned exorcism performed on Rosalita, a young woman. Rosalita calls Isabella by her name, despite not knowing her, and attacks the crew. Eventually, they get her under control.

During an exorcism on Maria, she mentions knowing what Ben did in the past and transfers demons to David and Isabella. The process is unsuccessful. The group presents evidence to the Church. Ben finds that there are four different demons speaking in unison. While performing an immersion baptism at church, David mutters lines from the Bible and starts forcefully submerging the baby in the holy water before passing out.

Soon after, Ben finds David at home with blood all over his forearms, much the way Maria was. The police arrive, and David acquires an officer's handgun. Ben tells him to fight it, but he begins to weep, reciting the Lord's Prayer, and forgets the last few words. He then shoots himself. Isabella begins having a seizure.

Ben and Michael take her to the hospital, where Isabella slashes a nurse's throat. Ben comes to the realization that Isabella is possessed. Ben and Michael leave with her in a car, heading to get help for an exorcism. Isabella tries to strangle Michael and breathes into his mouth. He instantly shows signs of possession, accelerating into oncoming traffic. The car collides, killing Ben and Michael in the process, while Isabella disappears from the wreckage.

A title card is shown informing that the case of the Rossi family is still unresolved and directing viewers to a website "for more information on the ongoing investigation". (Note: The website displayed, therossifiles.com, has been defunct since 2013. An archived version of the site as it appeared on the film's U.S. release date of January 6, 2012, is still available through the Wayback Machine.)

== Cast ==
- Fernanda Andrade as Isabella Rossi
- Simon Quarterman as Father Ben Rawlings
- Evan Helmuth as Father David Keane
- Ionut Grama as Michael Schaefer
- Suzan Crowley as Maria Rossi
- Bonnie Morgan as Rosalita
- Brian Johnson as Lieutenant Dreyfus
- Preston James Hillier as Male Reporter
- D.T. Carney as Detective
- John Prosky as Father Christopher Aimes

== Production ==
The film traces its origins to 2005, when Matthew Peterman read about the Catholic Church's school of exorcism and approached William Brent Bell to suggest using the idea for a screenplay. The two co-wrote a traditional script but eventually, according to Peterman, "got frustrated with that process". Following a suggestion from producer Morris Paulson, they rewrote it into a style reflecting the mockumentary and found footage techniques.

Principal photography began in 2010 in several locations, including Bucharest, Rome, and Vatican City. Lorenzo di Bonaventura and Steven Schneider took the film to Paramount Pictures, who ultimately produced it through their low-budget branch Insurge Pictures, acquiring the film as their first release in the hopes that it would replicate the success of Paranormal Activity.

== Reception ==
The film was not screened for critics. On the review aggregator website Rotten Tomatoes, 6% of 88 critics' reviews are positive. The website's consensus reads: "The Devil Inside is a cheap, choppy unscary mess, featuring one of the worst endings in recent memory." Metacritic, which uses a weighted average, assigned the film a score of 18 out of 100, based on 19 critics, indicating "overwhelming dislike". It received an "F" from CinemaScore, which tracks audience reaction.

The film topped the box office on its opening weekend, the first after the New Year's Day holiday (referred to as the dump months). It displaced Mission: Impossible – Ghost Protocol, which had held the position for three straight weeks. At the time, it was the third-best January opening weekend after Cloverfield and the Star Wars special edition. In its second weekend, the film dropped 76.2%, the largest second weekend drop for a film since Jonas Brothers: The 3D Concert Experience dropped 77.4%.

Peter Howell of the Toronto Star wrote that the film was a candidate for the worst film of the year. Stephen Whitty of The Star-Ledger wrote, "After The Blair Witch Project got by with sticks and stones and offscreen noises, filmmakers started thinking they didn't have to show anything. Well, no. It's better when you don't show too much—but if your story is about the supernatural, eventually you're going to have to come up with something. The Devil Inside can't." Michael Phillips of the Chicago Tribune felt that the film "joins a long, woozy-camera parade of found-footage scare pictures, among them The Blair Witch Project, the Paranormal Activity films and certain wedding videos that won't go away". Michael Rechtshaffen of The Hollywood Reporter stated that the film "proves as scary and unsettling as a slab of devil's food cake—only considerably less satisfying". The New York Times reviewer Manohla Dargis had a positive response to Crowley's acting and the scenes where the possessed is played by a contortionist, but said the film was just another foray into "a tediously exhausted subgenre that was already creatively tapped out when The Blair Witch Project spooked audiences more than a decade ago".

The film's ending received particular criticism. David Haglund of Slate asked whether it is the worst movie ending of all time, citing various negative audience reactions. He wrote, "What upset them even more than its abruptness was the title immediately following it that urged audiences to visit a website to learn more. [It's] a marketing twist that makes audiences feel taken advantage of." The writers defended themselves by saying that they knew the unconventional closure would draw criticism, but that it "felt authentic to us". Peterman said, "Sometimes real life doesn't follow a perfect structure. Things aren't always wrapped up and resolved when or how you'd like them to be. All of us enjoyed leaving things open ended. We thought it was visceral, we thought it was unique." Social media was flooded with videos of furious audience reactions, including one video showing an audience loudly booing and demanding refunds from Paramount. Some pointed out the website link being the worst addition, as they felt they paid admission to an incomplete film and were rewarded with an ending website title card that did not work. Bell defended the film by pointing out that the title card directing to a website was added by Paramount, given they "thought it was kind of cool to continue the story on this website".

Besides the preponderance of negative reviews, a handful of critics gave the film a positive review. Steve Barton of Dread Central stated, "The Devil Inside is home to moments that will shock, scare, disturb, and leave you gasping. It's a trip to the dark side that's well worth taking." Joe Leydon of Variety wrote that the film "generates a fair amount of suspense during sizable swaths of its familiar but serviceable exorcism-centric scenario".

== Legacy ==
The film's commercial success despite negative critical and audience reaction made it one of several that led studios to reconsider their longtime practice of confining horror films to the dump months and Halloween season. "For years, horror movies made $19–20 million in a January release. They would take the weekend and that would be it," C. Robert Cargill of Ain't It Cool News told Hollywood.com. "But The Devil Inside proved that even in our worst dumping ground, you can appeal to a market that won't see movies, and in fact they'll throw money at a terrible movie if it looks like it's good. I mean, $35 million is sick money for an opening weekend for a film that cost, what, $250,000?"

== See also ==
- Exorcism in Christianity
