= Momo (2025 film) =

- Directed by: Christian Ditter
- Screenplay by: Christian Ditter
- Based on: Momo by Michael Ende
- Produced by: Christian Becker
- Starring: Alexa Goodall; Araloyin Oshunremi; Kim Bodnia; Claes Bang; Laura Haddock; Jennifer Amaka Pettersson; David Schütter; Martin Freeman
- Cinematography: Christian Rein
- Edited by: Sandy Saffeels; Friedemann Schmidt
- Music by: Fil Eisler
- Production companies: Rat Pack Filmproduktion; Westside Filmproduktion; Constantin Film; Pakt Media
- Distributed by: Constantin Film
- Release date: 2 October 2025 (Germany)
- Running time: 91 minutes
- Country: Germany
- Language: English

Momo is a 2025 English-language German fantasy film written and directed by Christian Ditter. It adapts Michael Ende’s 1973 novel Momo. The film stars Alexa Goodall as the title character alongside Araloyin Oshunremi, Kim Bodnia, Claes Bang, Laura Haddock, Jennifer Amaka Pettersson, David Schütter and Martin Freeman. The project was developed by producer Christian Becker for Rat Pack Filmproduktion, Westside Filmproduktion and Constantin Film in collaboration with Pakt Media. Fil Eisler composed the score, Christian Rein served as cinematographer and the film was edited by Sandy Saffeels and Friedemann Schmidt. Momo had its world premiere at the 2025 Zurich Film Festival during the gala section and was released theatrically in Germany on 2 October 2025.

== Plot ==
Momo is an orphan girl who lives in the ruins of an ancient amphitheatre and befriends the locals. She has a gift for listening to people and helping them solve their problems. When a powerful corporation of grey-clad agents persuades people to “save” their time in a time bank, the populace becomes obsessed with efficiency and loses their sense of joy. Momo discovers that the so-called time savings are being stolen, and with the help of Master Hora and his tortoise Cassiopeia, she confronts the time thieves before their time is lost.

== Cast ==
- Alexa Goodall as Momo
- Araloyin Oshunremi as Gino
- Jennifer Amaka Pettersson as Liliana
- Claes Bang as the Judge
- Laura Haddock as Jackie
- Martin Freeman as Master Hora
- Kim Bodnia as Bepo
- Skylar Blu Copeland as Maria
- Maxwell Smith as Paolo
- David Schütter as Brutes
- Dusko Valentić and Kurt Ravn as Uncle Roman
  - Jon Glover as Uncle Roman (voice)
- Mylène Gomera as Sergeant Gray
- Madeleine Akua as Jenny
- Charlie Mann as Jack
- Anna Martine Freeman as Dan
- Naomi McDonald as Cassiopeia (voice)

== Production ==
The novel Momo has been adapted several times, notably a 1986 live-action film and a 2001 animated feature. In May 2024, Deadline reported that producer Christian Becker and writer-director Christian Ditter were developing a big-budget English-language adaptation. Alexa Goodall was cast as the young orphan and a main cast including Araloyin Oshunremi, Kim Bodnia, Claes Bang, Laura Haddock, Jennifer Amaka Pettersson, David Schütter and Martin Freeman. A second article from the Cannes market explained that the project was one of Rat Pack’s most ambitious, and noted that Michael Ende’s novel has sold more than 13 million copies worldwide.

The official Michael Ende site summarises the film’s premise and lists the producers as Rat Pack Filmproduktion, Westside Filmproduktion, Constantin Film Production and Pakt Media, with Christian Ditter directing and Christian Becker producing. The same source notes that the running time is about 92 minutes.

=== Filming ===
According to a production listing in Variety, the crew includes cinematographer Christian Rein, composer Fil Eisler and editors Sandy Saffeels and Friedemann Schmidt. The article lists Christian Becker as producer and Martin Bachmann, Oliver Berben, Roman Hocke and Martin Moszkowicz among the executive producers. The OutNow review reports that Ditter shot the film in English with an international cast and filmed on location in Croatia and Slovenia. In particular, the Pula Arena was used as Momo's home.

== Release ==
Momo was selected as one of the gala world premieres at the 2025 Zurich Film Festival. Screen Daily noted that the festival runs from 25 September to 5 October 2025 and described the film as a fantasy about a young orphan who fights a corporation that steals people’s time. The OutNow film page lists 2 October 2025 as the film’s theatrical release in German-speaking Switzerland; Constantin Film released it in Germany on the same date. The running time is 91 minutes.

== Reception ==
Variety reviewer Carlos Aguilar wrote that Ditter’s film is “visually enticing” but that its themes and characters are too superficially rendered. Aguilar noted that the plot centres on an enigmatic red-haired girl who listens to people and learns of the Grey corporation’s villainous plans. He also described the Grey agents as “time thieves” who convince people to wear bracelets that monitor productivity as a critique of economic systems that demand constant efficiency. In a review for the Swiss website OutNow, Petra Schrackmann praised the film’s fantasy effects but criticised its cold tone and English-language performances; she felt the film targets the self-optimisation craze of social media rather than offering the novel’s critique of capitalism. She also said the updated adaptation lacked magic and warmth despite some beautiful imagery.

== See also ==
- Momo (1986 film)
- Momo (2001 animated film)
- Momo (2003 animated television series)

== Links ==
https://www.imdb.com/title/tt26325131/
