= Prescription drug overuse =

Excess use of prescription medications

Prescription drug overuse or non-medical prescription drug use is the use of prescription medications that is more than the prescribed amount, regardless of whether the original medical reason to take the drug is legitimate. A prescription drug is a drug substance prescribed by a doctor and intended to for individual use only.

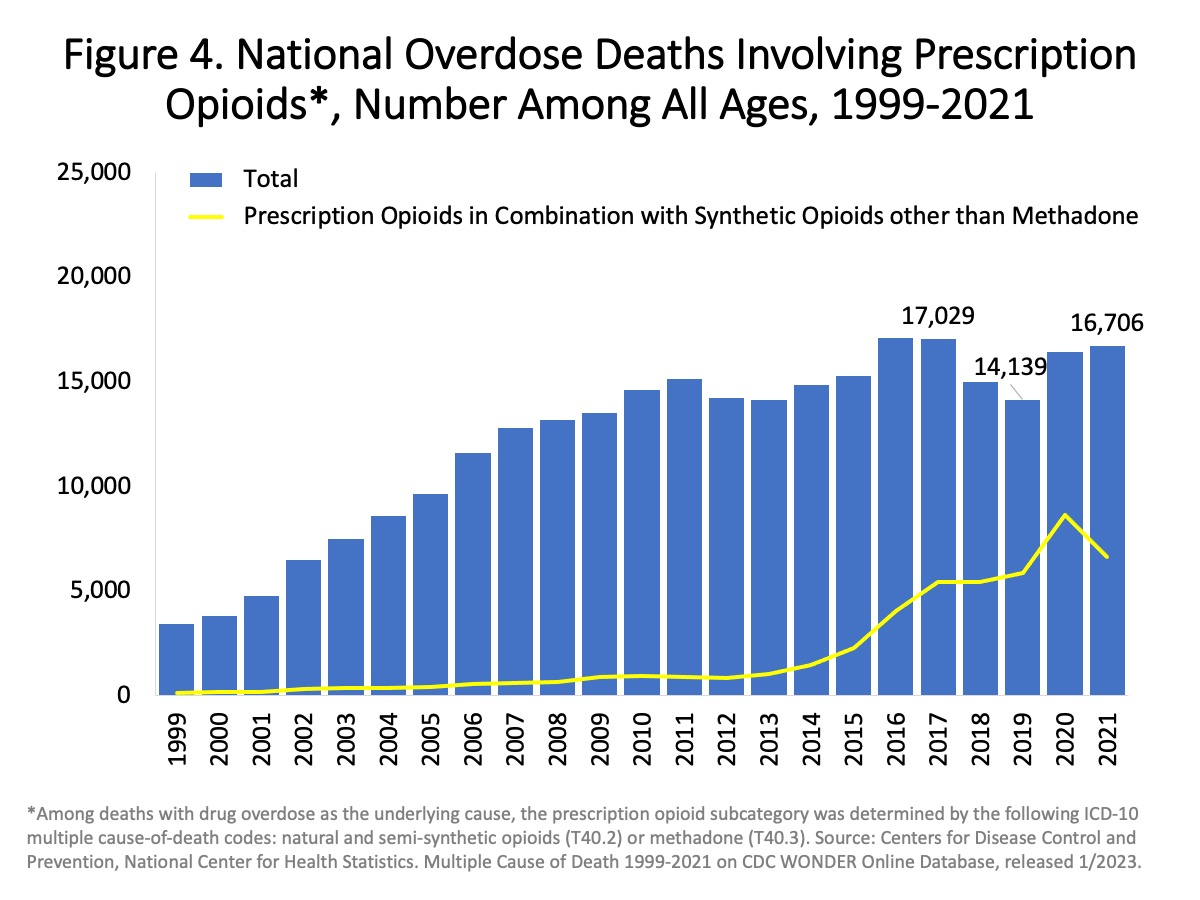
Trend of national death involving prescription opioid overdose in the United States

Commonly overused prescription drugs include opioids, stimulants, antibiotics. Some drugs are overused due to their addictive nature. In particular, the misuse of prescribed opioid painkillers has emerged as significant public health concern. For instance, in the United States alone, there were 16,706 deaths attributed to prescription opioid overdose in 2021. In response to the social and medical consequences of prescription drug overuse, various governmental initiatives have been implemented to mitigate prescription drug abuse.

== Types of commonly overused prescription drugs ==
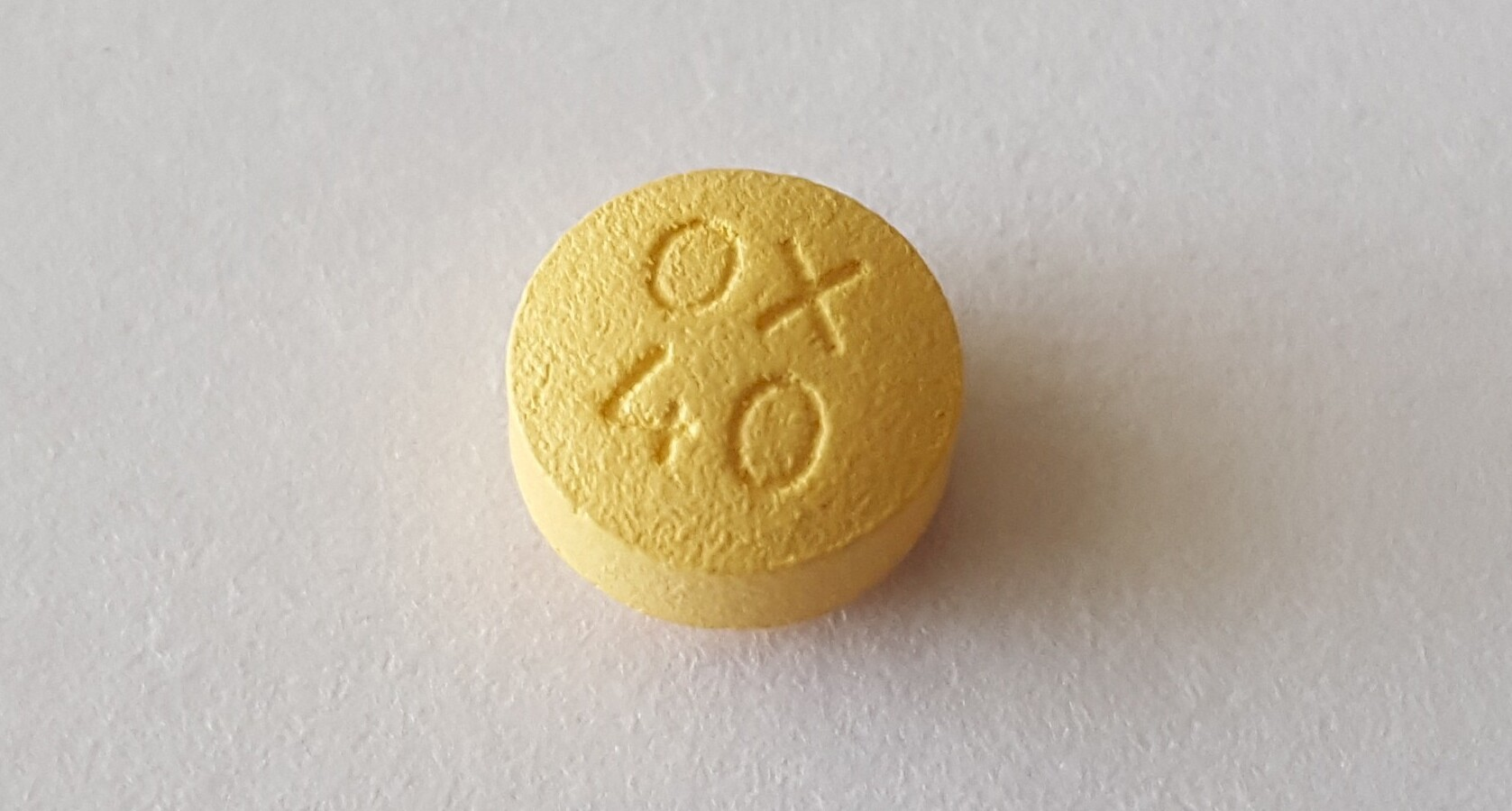
Oxycodone pill, a commonly overused prescription opioid

Opioids, such as fentanyl, morphine, and oxycodone, are used to treat post-surgery pain and chronic pain. Opioids work by affecting the brain cells and reducing the perception of pain. Other side effects include euphoria, mood changes, and the clouding or complete loss of consciousness. Due to their high potential misuse and addictive properties, opioids are highly regulated and controlled by healthcare departments.

Additionally, stimulants, antianxiety medicines, and sedatives are addictive drugs that are commonly overused. Antianxiety medicines, such as benzodiazepine, are used to treat anxiety and panic attacks.

Antibiotics are often overused in a primary healthcare setting to treat bacterial infection. General practitioners sometimes overprescribe antibiotics in mild sore throat or ear infections, due to concerns over infection complications. Antibiotics are often overused due to physicians' overprescription or unreasonable medical requests made by patients. Unlike other prescription drugs, antibiotics are not addictive.

== Causes of prescription drug overuse ==
=== Addictive nature of certain prescription drugs ===
The addictive nature of certain prescription drugs stems from their impact on the brain's 'reward system' . Some addictive drugs stimulate the release of dopamine, a hormone associated with pleasure and happiness, reinforcing the desire for continued drug use.

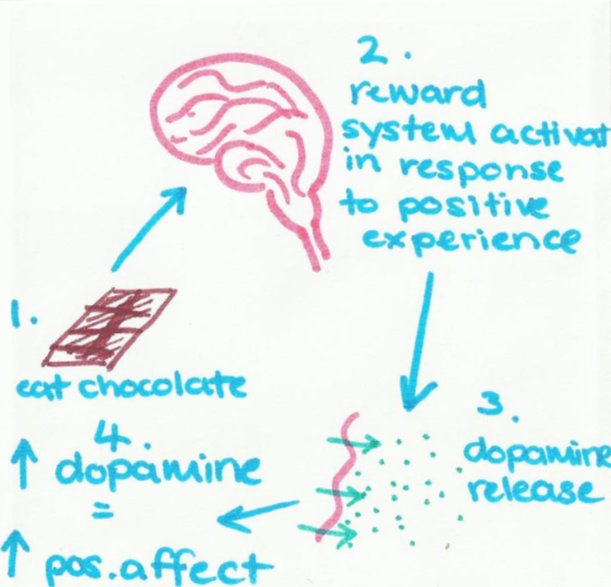
A simple analogy of the 'brain reward' system

Tolerance may develop over time, in which the brain adapts to the drug and produces fewer 'happy hormones' compared to the initial drug intake. Individuals might consume more of the drug to achieve the same level of pleasure. A simple analogy is a child consumes a piece of chocolate and enjoys it very much, and progressively, he consumes more chocolate over time. Drug addicts may become unable to resist the urge to take the drugs, similar to how a child cannot resist taking chocolate.

=== Overprescription by physicians ===
Insulin for Diabetes Mellitus

Physicians sometimes overprescribe medications. This is hard to avoid as weighing up the balance between benefit and harm of prescribing more medications depends on the physicians' objective opinions . Although treatment guidelines are established to guide the prescription process, the guidelines are usually based on a single illness, and fail to account for the concurrent diseases and extreme old age . Commonly overprescribed drugs include insulin for diabetes mellitus, statin drugs for high blood cholesterol, antihypertensives for hypertension, and proton pump inhibitors for excessive gastric acid production .

=== Polypharmacy ===
Polypharmacy refers to the concurrent use of 5 or more types of medications. It can be classified as appropriate or inappropriate, depending on whether the number of medications prescribed is clinically indicated. One of the causes of inappropriate polypharmacy stems from overprescription and misprescription. As older adults may have multiple concurrent chronic diseases, and the appropriate medications and doses may be different for them, inappropriate prescription may occur. Visiting multiple physicians and obtaining medications with similar drug effects, and self-purchasing medications, can both contribute to polypharmacy in older adults. Therefore, the management of polypharmacy in older age patients should be treated seriously and vigilantly by healthcare professionals.

== Oxycodone in the opioid epidemic ==
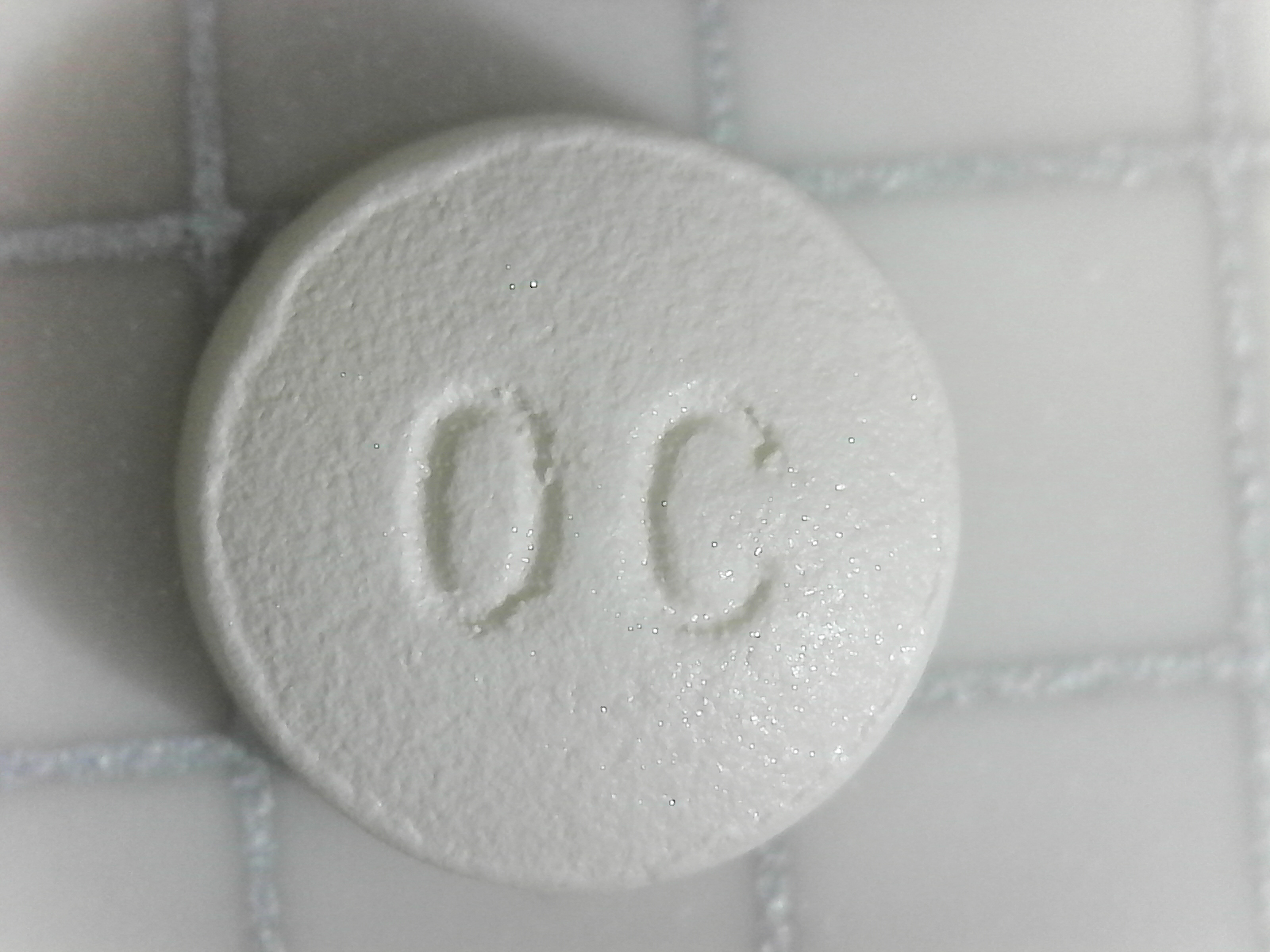
Oxycontin pill, 10 mg

Chemical structure of Oxycodone

Oxycodone, marketed under the brand name Oxycontin, played a significant role in fueling the opioid epidemic in the United States. Purdue Pharma's aggressive marketing tactics, including physician targeting and misleading advertising, contributed to the widespread overuse and overprescription of the drug. After the release of Oxycontin in 1996, the drug swiftly became one of the most overused drugs between 1997-2007 in the United States. The consequences of the Oxycontin epidemic have been devastating, with tens of thousands of overdose deaths attributed to oxycodone products.

=== Oxycontin's vast promotion ===
Between 1996-2001, Purdue Pharma organised more than 40 pain management conferences, held in resort destinations such as Florida and Arizona. These conferences recruited and trained up to 2500 physicians to advocate for the use Oxycontin at other talks.

Logo of Purdue Pharma

Purdue also funded nine programs designed to educate hospital staff on postoperative pain management, and distributed videos and a book about Oxycontin directly to the medical staff. While the Food and Drug Administration (FDA) was responsible to oversee all drug advertising materials to ensure accuracy, the agency faced challenges due to understaffing and the volume of promotional materials, resulting in delays in identifying misleading drug advertisements.

United States Food and Drug Administration (FDA)

To further incentivize sales, Purdue Pharma implemented a highly lucrative bonus system for its sales representatives. This system targeted physicians who frequently initiated opioid treatments, encouraging them to increase their prescription rates and prescribed dosages.

=== Consequences of the Oxycontin epidemic ===
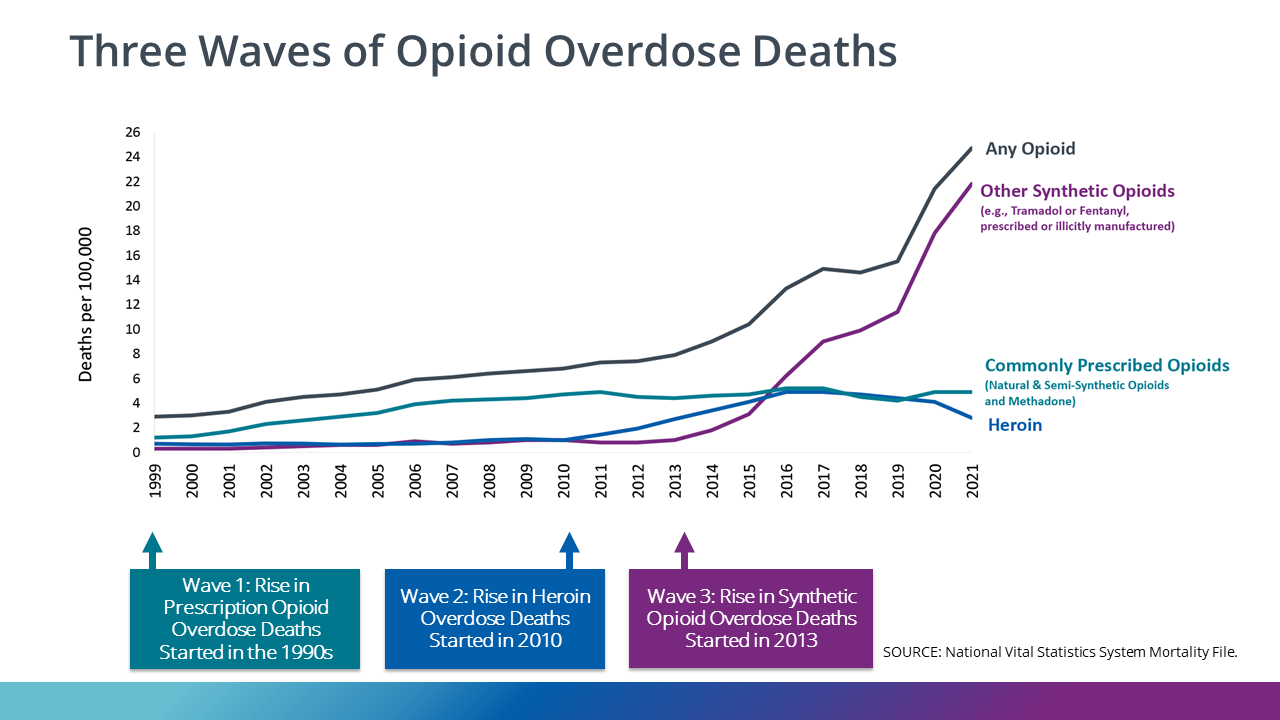
3 wave of opioid epidemic in the United States

The release of Oxycontin marked the beginning of a devastating opioid epidemic, with oxycodone products remaining among the most frequently encountered drugs by law enforcement. From 2011 to 2016, over 33000 overdose deaths in the United States involved the use of oxycodone.

Purdue Pharma asserted that the drug offered 12-hour pain relief, however, evidence revealed that the company was aware of the drug's rapid release through clinical trials conducted prior to marketing. As the pain-relieving effects of the medication wear off sooner than expected, users of Oxycontin are at an increased risk of experiencing withdrawal.

Overprescription of Oxycontin was indirectly promoted by the sales representatives. Knowing that the drug effects wear off earlier than advertised, the sales representatives encouraged the physicians to increase the dose of drugs, instead of increasing the frequency of drug intake. Overprescription may have contributed to the development of drug withdrawal effects.

The Oxycontin epidemic prompted scrutiny of Purdue Pharma's marketing practices and the need for comprehensive solutions to address the prescription drug overuse epidemic. It also showcased the importance of ethical marketing practices within the pharmaceutical industry, as well as stringent regulatory measures to prevent similar crises from occurring.

== Antibiotics ==
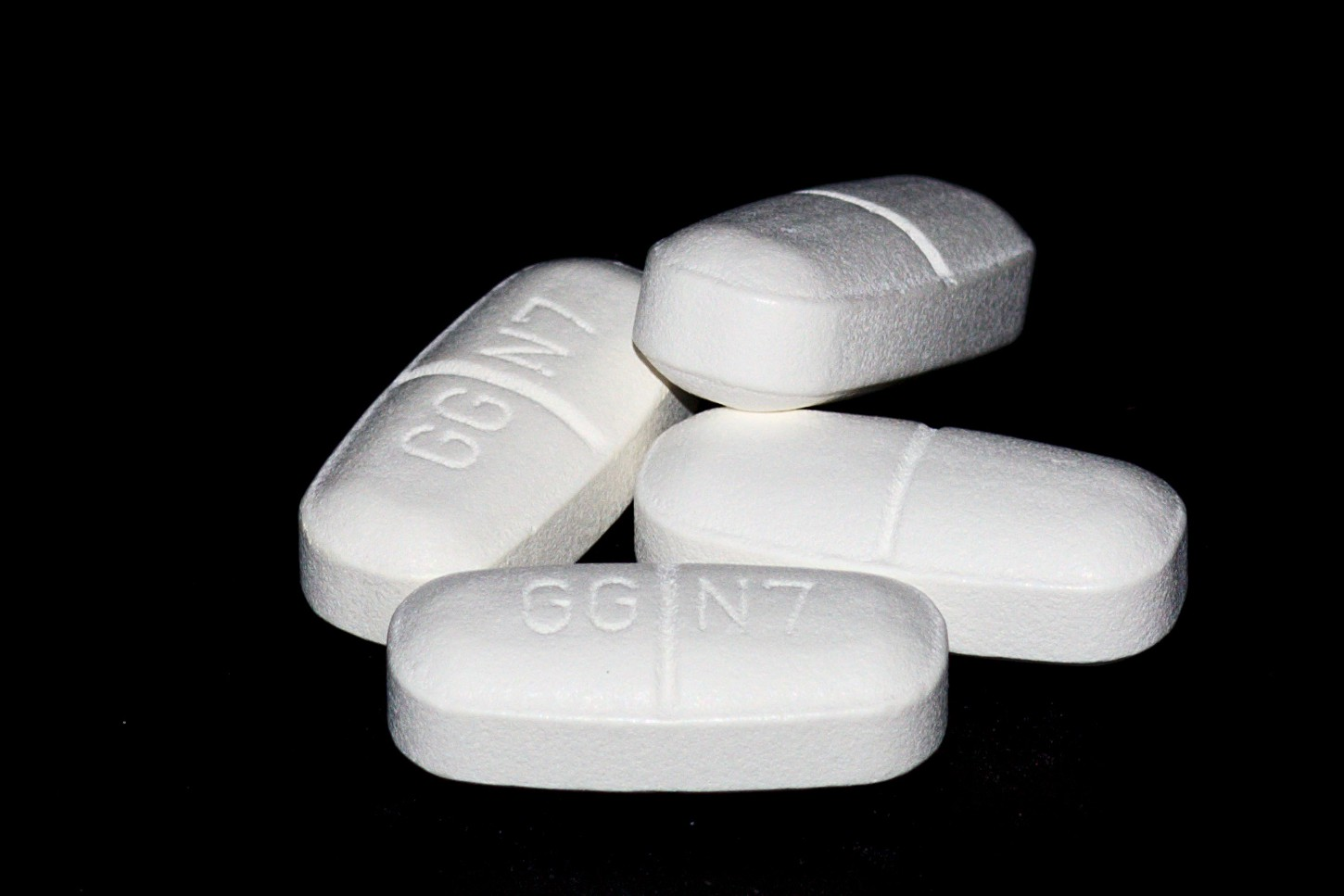
Penicillin pill

Antibiotics work by killing bacteria directly or inhibiting its ability to reproduce and multiply. Antibiotics are prescribed to treat bacterial infections, such as urinary tract infections and E. Coli. Some common antibiotics include penicillins, amoxicillin, and tetracycline. Antibiotics do not work on viruses as viruses do not have the structure that antibiotics act on.

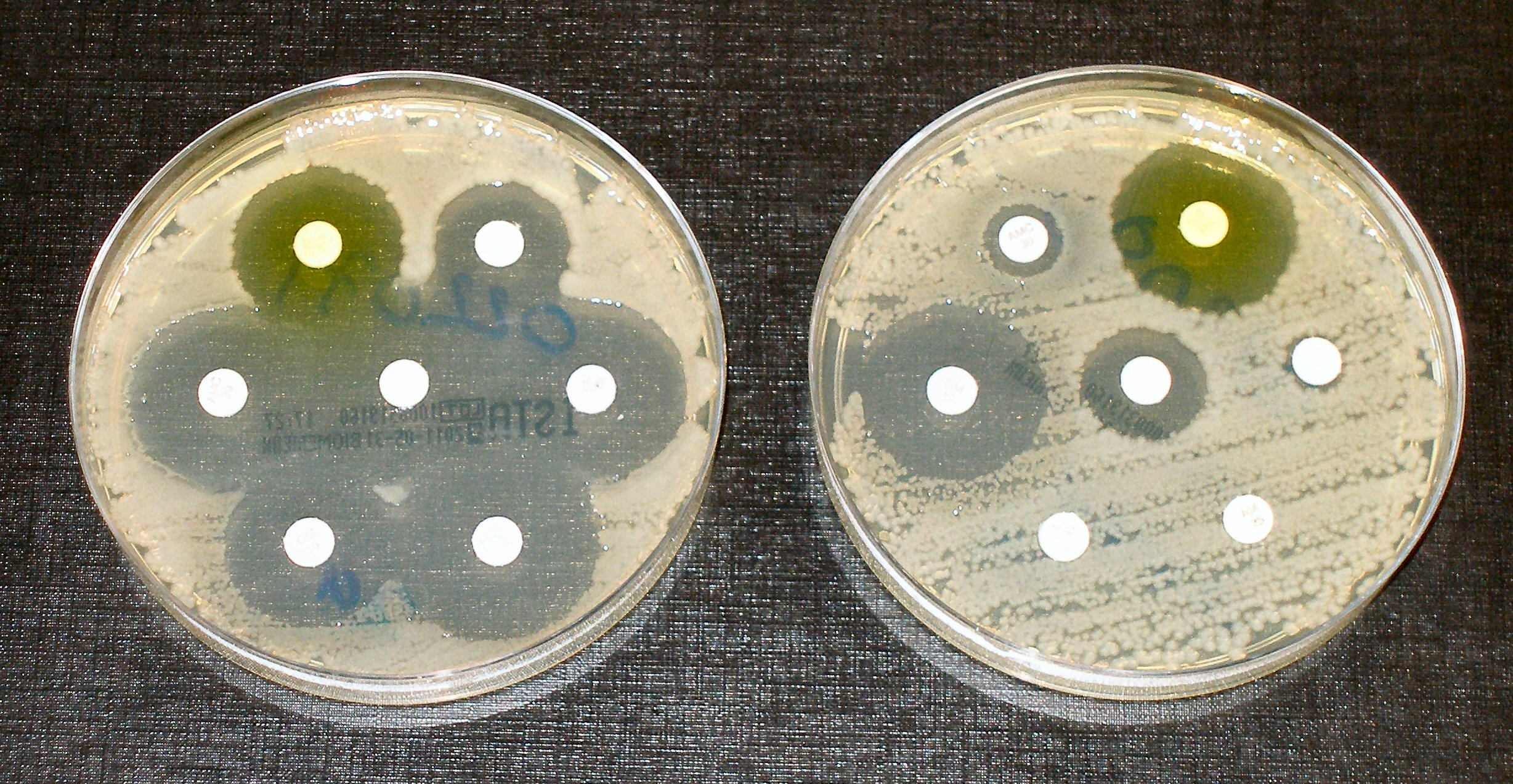
Antibiotic resistance shown in the right Petri dish. The white pills are antibiotics. The unclear regions indicate the extent of bacterial growth and antimicrobial resistance.

Antimicrobial resistance (AMR) is caused by overprescription of antibiotics. Antimicrobial resistance refers to bacteria, fungi, viruses and parasites which has evolved and developed the ability to withstand and defeat the effects of antibiotics. This makes the infections more difficult to treat, and increases risks of transmission. Antimicrobial resistance is a mechanism of natural selection in which bacteria evolves and adapts to the antibiotics. This process naturally occurs over time, but the excessive and improper use of antibiotics accelerates it. In 2023, 569,000 deaths were associated with antimicrobial resistance across 35 countries of the WHO regions of Americas.

=== Causes of antibiotics overprescription ===
Clear guidelines are established to guide the prescription of antibiotics. For example, administering antibiotics for viral illnesses such as influenza or the common cold is not beneficial and leads to side effects. Yet, the problem of antibiotics overprescription is still prevalent.

The influence of patients on physicians is one of the major contributing factors. Patients or their families sometimes anticipate an antibiotics prescription at the clinics, regardless of whether an antibiotic is truly needed. It is proven that the underlying pressure from patients, whether its spoken or perceived, may increase the likelihood of prescribing antibiotics. Patients may not have sufficient knowledge on their illnesses and the uses of antibiotics, and self-determine that antibiotics are the best cure for their illnesses.

Decision fatigue also contributes to antibiotics overprescription. It refers to the deteriorating quantity of physicians to make accurate decisions based on the patients' unique profile. In a clinical setting, doctors often have limited time to see the patients, give diagnoses, and formulate treatment plans. Some doctors tend to prescribe antibiotics, necessary or not, to avoid lengthy explanations and discussions with patients.

=== Common example of antimicrobial resistance ===
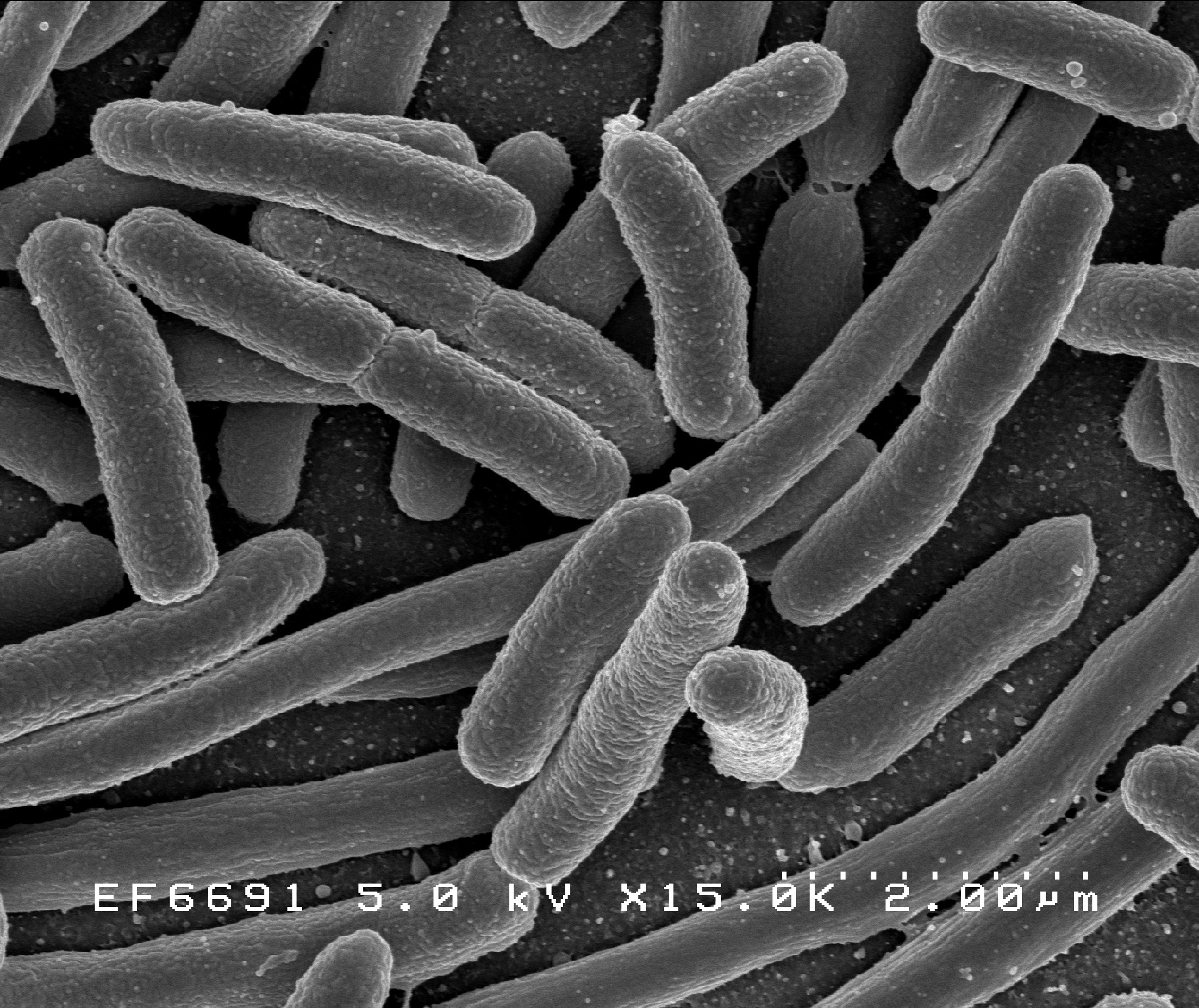
E. coli bacteria

Cephalosporin-resistant E. Coli is an E. Coli bacteria that evolve to produce enzymes known as extended-spectrum beta-lactamases, making them resistant against various types of antibiotics, such as Cephalosporin and penicillin. According to WHO, median report rates had shown 76 countries of 42% for third-generation cephalosporin-resistant E. coli.

=== Consequences of antimicrobial rResistance ===
Antimicrobial resistance is a serious threat to global health, affecting countries in all regions regardless of the income levels. The rate of resistance development exceeds the rate of new antibiotics development. The discrepancy limits the effectiveness of antibiotics and the potential choices of drugs used to treat bacterial infections, posing a significant challenge to modern medicine. In addition to health concerns, antimicrobial resistance poses a significant burden on healthcare costs. The World Bank estimates an addition of over US$1 trillion healthcare costs by 2050 and US$1 trillion to US$3.4 trillion in gross domestic product losses per year by 2023.

== Prevention ==
=== Education ===
Raising awareness through educating parents, teenagers, patients, and healthcare professionals is a crucial first step in changing the issue of prescription drug overuse. There have been significant progress in raising the awareness of the dangers of overusing prescription drugs, but many parents still have the misconception that prescription drugs are less dangerous than illegal drugs when abused, solely because prescription drugs are government-approved. Hence, many misguided parents do not understand the perilous consequences of giving prescribed medications to family members for whom it was not prescribed. Besides, some parents are even unaware of the fact that youths are abusing their prescription medications from unlocked cabinets.

Physicians, pharmacists and other healthcare professionals also play a significant role in controlling the use of prescribed medications. Most healthcare providers receive minimal training on the importance of proper and appropriate dispensing of opioids to avoid adverse drug reactions and addictions.

Educational campaigns are thus essential in tackling prescription drug overuse, as it strengthens the public's understanding of prescription drug overuse. Promotion and training regarding proper prescription drug prescribing and dispensing, targeting healthcare professionals, can also enhance monitoring and prevention of overuse.

=== The role of NGOs and government bodies ===
Governments have implemented different initiatives and legislations that aim to mitigate the misuse of medications, along with the existing regulations and ordinances for the control of the retail of drugs. The legislation addresses common issues, such as doctor-shopping, prescription drug monitoring laws, and access to certain types of medications.

For prescription monitoring laws, government bodies initiated legislation for the code of practice for pharmacists to dispense medications in different regions. In certain Asian jurisdictions, such as Hong Kong, their healthcare systems do not implement the separation of prescribing and dispensing. This means that the practice of physicians prescribing is not independent from a pharmacist providing that medication. In Hong Kong, the sales and supply of medications in retail settings is controlled based on the Pharmacy and Poisons Ordinance (Cap.138) legislation. Retail pharmacists are required to keep registers where details of the prescription must be recorded upon dispensing of medications under a prescription. This prevents the risk of over-dispensing by pharmacists, as well as keeping the supply of medications under control.

In the United States, prescription drug programs are electronic databases in which physicians and clinicians can record and track the history of medications prescribed to patients. These programs are associated with lower rates of the prescription of opioids. In addition, the Centers for Disease Control and Prevention (CDC) issued opioids indicated for chronic pain guidelines in 2016, which prevented overprescription of opioids by physicians.

Healthcare professionals also play an impactful role in the dispensing and use of controlled substances. Pharmacists should ensure drug compliance by patient counseling on various uses of drugs, as well as the potential risk factors and side effects. It is crucial to maximize the effectiveness of controlled substances through concurrent lifestyle modifications, and to minimize the number of medications used whenever feasible. This approach helps to ensure adherence to the treatment regimen, and avoid the overuse of prescription drug.
