= William Brent Bell =

American screenwriter and film director

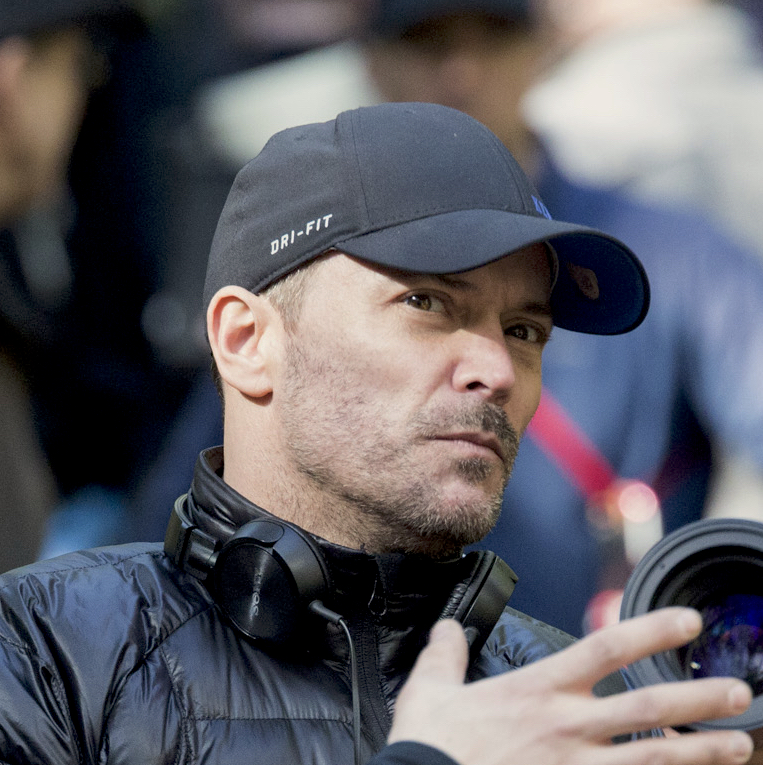
- Bell on the set of The Boy in 2015
- Born: Lexington, Kentucky, U.S.
- Occupations: Film director, screenwriter, producer
- Years active: 1997–present

William Brent Bell is an American film director, screenwriter, and producer. He is known for films Stay Alive (2006), The Devil Inside (2012), Wer (2013), The Boy (2016), Brahms: The Boy II (2020), Separation (2021), Orphan: First Kill (2022), Lord of Misrule (2023), and Orphans (2026). His films have grossed over $300 million worldwide at the box office.

== Life and career ==
Bell was born in Lexington, Kentucky. Along with writing partner Matthew Peterman, Bell sold screenplay Mercury to Universal Studios with Gale Anne Hurd producing. Bell and Peterman set up studio projects such as Ignition at Warner Bros. and Illusion at Walt Disney Pictures. The duo created several one-hour TV series including Eye to Eye with Warner Bros. Television and McG, Worthy and McGraw with ABC Television and Tim Minear as well as The Fix with Sony Television.

Bell's first horror project was as co-writer and director of Stay Alive, produced with McG and Peter Schlessel and financed by Spyglass Entertainment. Stay Alive was distributed domestically by Buena Vista Pictures and internationally by Universal Pictures. His second horror film was The Devil Inside, co-written and produced by Peterman and Morris Paulson. The film was released by Paramount Pictures. The film topped the US box office on its opening weekend, becoming a record-breaking commercial success and grossing over $100 million.

In 2013, Bell shot his third horror film, Wer which was released by Focus Features. Nav Qateel of Influx Magazine called Wer, "the best Werewolf film I've seen in years, or perhaps, ever." Epic Horror Review wrote, "Wer not only redefines the werewolf movie but also saves it." Wer would go on to be described by horrornews.net as, "One of the best films I've seen so far this year and a must to watch." and "a film that you want to not only watch but add to your collection" by wickedchannel.com

In 2014, Bell sold his pilot Posthuman to USA Network and Universal Cable Productions with Jason Blum producing. In 2015, Bell set up a series at Fox entitled Haunted with Chris Morgan.

In 2015, Bell would direct The Boy, produced by Lakeshore Entertainment and Roy Lee. The script was written by Stacey Menear and starred Lauren Cohan, Diana Hardcastle, Ben Robson, Rupert Evans, and James Russell. STX Entertainment released The Boy on January 22, 2016, and it went on to gross a worldwide total of $77 million, against a budget of just $8 million. Chris Alexander of ShockTilYouDrop called it "one of the best contemporary wide release horror movies I've seen in years." Joe Leydon criticized the story line as average in Variety and commented, "Despite game efforts by the cast, this tepid horror opus is never scary enough to overcome its silly premise." In 2017, GQ Magazine called the film, "the most underrated horror movie of 2016."

In 2019 Bell directed the sequel Brahms: The Boy II, starring Katie Holmes, Ralph Ineson, Christopher Convery and Owain Yeoman. It was written by Stacey Menear and released in 2020 by STX Entertainment. Later that year, Bell directed and produced Separation based on a screenplay by Nick Amadeus and Josh Braun, starring Rupert Friend, Violet McGraw, Mamie Gummer, Madeline Brewer and Brian Cox. In March 2021, Open Road Films and Briarcliff Entertainment released the film.

In 2021, Bell directed Orphan: First Kill from a screenplay by David Coggeshall, a prequel to the 2009 film Orphan. David Leslie Johnson-McGoldrick served as executive producer. Isabelle Fuhrman reprised her role as Esther, with Julia Stiles also starring. Paramount Pictures acquired U.S. distribution rights to the film, Orphan: First Kill was released on August 19, by Paramount Players in select theatres, digital, and streaming via Paramount+. As of December 15, 2022, the $8 million Orphan: First Kill grossed $44.5 million worldwide. On review aggregator Rotten Tomatoes, the film holds an approval rating of 72% based on 137 reviews

In 2023, Bell produced and directed Lord of Misrule, a folk horror film starring Tuppence Middleton, Ralph Ineson, Evie Templeton, and Matt Stokoe. Lord of Misrule was released by Magnolia Pictures and Magnet Releasing in select theatres, digital, and streaming via Hulu in 2024. The film currently holds an approval rating of 63% with an audience rating of 80% on Rotten Tomatoes Lord of Misrule was included on the Hollywood Reporter list of "Best Horror Films of 2023."

Bell is currently in post on his latest film, Orphans. The prequel to Orphan: First Kill for Dark Castle will be released domestically by Paramount Pictures via Republic Pictures and internationally by Lionsgate.

== Filmography ==
Year	Film	Director	Writer	Producer
1997	Sparkle and Charm	Yes	Yes	Yes
2006	Stay Alive	Yes	Yes	No
2012	The Devil Inside	Yes	Yes	Yes
2013	Wer	Yes	Yes	Yes
2016	The Boy	Yes	No	No
2020	Brahms: The Boy II	Yes	No	No
2021	Separation	Yes	No	Yes
2022	Orphan: First Kill	Yes	No	No
2023	Lord of Misrule	Yes	No	Yes
2026	Orphans	Yes	No	Yes
