= Orphan (film series) =

American horror film series

Orphan (franchise)
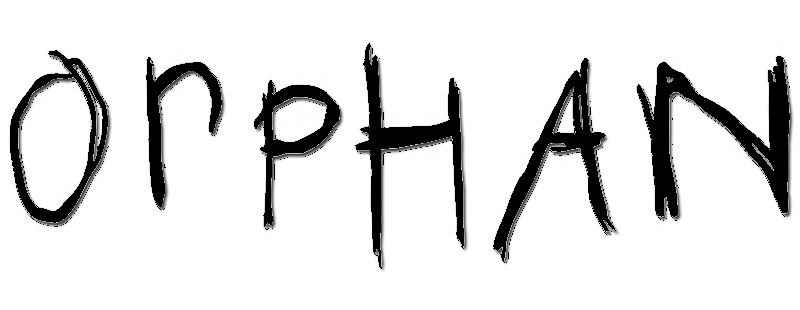
- Official film series logo
- Based on: Characters by Alex Mace
- Starring: Isabelle Fuhrman
- Production company: Dark Castle Entertainment
- Distributed by: Warner Bros. Pictures (2009); Paramount Players (2022); Republic Pictures (TBA)
- Release dates: July 24, 2009 (Orphan); August 19, 2022 (Orphan: First Kill)
- Country: United States
- Language: English
- Budget: > ~$40,000,000 (3 films)
- Box office: $124,355,110 (2 films)

The Orphan film series, consists of American psychological slasher-horror movies, based on characters created by Alex Mace and starring Isabelle Fuhrman in the primary role; consisting of a theatrical film, a hybrid limited theatrical-VOD-streaming prequel, and its sequel described as an "inbetweenquel" in production. The plot centers around a psychopathic serial killer Estonian named Leena Klammer who lives with a hypopituitarism hormonal condition which caused proportionate dwarfism, and allows her to pose as an orphaned child. Taking on the alias of Esther Albright, Leena repeatedly orchestrates scenarios where she can victimize her would-be adoptive parents. Each installment follows the attempts of survival by adopters, while Leena sadistically manipulates their marriages, tortures and kills her adopted families.

While the movies received mixed critical reception, each installment turned a profit at the box office. The series garnered a fanbase, and through retrospective modern analysis, the original earned its status as a cult classic within its genre.

== Films ==
Title	Director	Screenwriter	Story by	Producer(s)
Orphan	Jaume Collet-Serra	David Leslie Johnson-McGoldrick	Alex Mace	Joel Silver, Susan Downey, Jennifer Davisson Killoran and Leonardo DiCaprio
Orphan: First Kill	William Brent Bell	David Coggeshall	David Leslie Johnson-McGoldrick and Alex Mace	Alex Mace, Hal Sadoff, Ethan Erwin and James Tomlinson
Orphans	William Brent Bell	David Coggeshall		Alex Mace, David Leslie Johnson-McGoldrick and Norman Golighty

Orphan story chronology
- Orphans (TBA)
- Orphan: First Kill (2022)
- Orphan (2009)

=== Orphan (2009) ===
Kate and John Coleman begin to rebuild their estranged marriage, after the passing of their stillborn baby named Jessica. Together they determine to adopt, welcoming a 9-year-old Estonian orphan named Esther into their family. The family works together to have meaningful relationships with Esther, though this proves difficult as their son Daniel has strained interactions with her, and their deaf and mute daughter Max struggles to have a legitimate bond. Through a series of troublesome events, Kate begins to question Esther's mental state. As he continues to grow closer to his adoptive daughter, John refuses to acknowledge the concerns that the rest of the family sees as behavioral trouble. Kate begins to investigate the background of her adoptive daughter and to her horror discovers that Esther is actually a full-grown woman named Leena Klammer who is a violent serial killer with a hormonal hypopituitarism which caused a rare medical case of proportionate dwarfism; she previously escaped the Saarne Institute mental hospital. Realizing her family is in danger, Kate frantically works to save the lives of those closest to her before Leena can kill again.

=== Orphan: First Kill (2022) ===
Prior to being adopted by the Coleman family, Leena Klammer expertly orchestrates her escape from the Estonian mental hospital known as the Saarne Institute by seduction and murder. Making her way to Russia, Leena cons local authorities into believing she is a missing American child named Esther Albright. Upon notification that their lost daughter has been found, the wealthy couple Allen and Tricia Albright travel to retrieve her before returning home. As questions begin to arise, Tricia and their son Gunnar rightfully doubt that Esther has returned to them. As the truth is revealed, Tricia frantically works to protect her family from the machinations of the socio-psychopath determined to murder again.

=== Orphans (TBA) ===
In August 2022, when asked about his approach to making the sequel, Bell stated that there would need to be a third film in order for Orphan to be considered a franchise. Later, Fuhrman expressed interest in continuing to portray the character in additional films. Bell later stated that should the prequel prove to be successful, a third film could be developed. The filmmaker expressed interest in exploring a darker third installment that would complete a full story of Leena Klammer/Esther, while stating that there could be multiple sequels: "...Isabelle [Fuhrman] is so passionate about the character – [she] can play this character forever… there's a lot to that character, and I think in the future stories, she would probably become a bit more cold-hearted again. Fuhrman confirmed that discussions for a third film, among the creatives and studio are ongoing, stating that there would not be another "13 years this time around" before a sequel is developed. In December 2023, it was announced that a third film was officially in development.

In November 2024, Dark Castle announced that a third film had been green-lit by Lionsgate, which would launch the project at the American Film Market. Brent Bell and Coggeshall is set to return as director and screenwriter, while Isabelle Fuhrman reprises her role as Leena Klammer/Esther. Fuhrman later expressed excitement, stating that the quality of the script is what convinced her to sign on to the project. By April 2025, the actress stated that the next installment will be an 'inbetweenquel' as it will depict separate events that take place after Orphan (2009), as well as the prequel Orphan: First Kill (2022). Later, it was clarified that Orphans will be a prequel to both movies. Stephen Moyer, Susanne Wuest, and Simon Man will feature in supporting roles. Alex Mace, David Leslie Johnson-McGoldrick, and Norman Golighty serve as producers; Fuhrmann, Kelly Gallagher, and Victor Moyers are executive producers, while Robert Bell, Josh Ethier, Jonathan Halperyn, and Daniel Kresmerywhile serve as co-producers. The project is a joint-venture production between Lionsgate, Dark Castle Entertainment, Republic Pictures, Gnosis Moving Pictures, and Hero Squared Productions.

Principal photography commenced on November 10, 2025; with production wrapping by December 12 of the same year.

== Main cast and characters ==
List indicators

This section includes characters who will appear or have appeared in more than two films in the series.

- An empty grey cell indicates the character was not in the film, or that the character's official presence has not yet been confirmed.
- ^{C} indicates a cameo role.
- ^{P} indicates an appearance in onscreen photographs.
- ^{V} indicates a voice-only role.

Character	Films		
Character	Orphan	Orphan: First Kill	Orphans
Character	2009	2022	TBA
Leena Klammer Esther Albright–Coleman	Isabelle Fuhrman	Isabelle Fuhrman	Isabelle Fuhrman
Katherine "Kate" Coleman	Vera Farmiga		
John Coleman	Peter Sarsgaard		
Sister Abigail	CCH Pounder		
Daniel "Dan" Coleman	Jimmy Bennett		
Dr. Browning	Margo Martindale		
Dr. Värava	Karel Roden		
Maxine "Max" Coleman	Aryana Engineer		
Grandma Barbara Coleman	Rosemary Dunsmore		
Tricia Albright		Julia Stiles	
Allen Albright		Rossif Sutherland	
Detective Donnan		Hiro Kanagawa	
Gunner Albright		Matthew Finlan	
Dr. Segar		Samantha Walkes	
Dr. Novory		Dave Brown	

== Additional crew and production details ==
Film	Crew/Detail					
Film	Composer	Cinematographer	Editor	Production companies	Distributing companies	Running time
Orphan	John Ottman	Jeff Cutter	Tim Alverson	Dark Castle Entertainment, Appian Way Productions	Warner Bros. Pictures	2 hrs 3 mins
Orphan: First Kill	Brett Detar	Karim Hussain	Josh Ethier	Dark Castle Entertainment, Entertainment One, Eagle Vision	Paramount Pictures, Paramount+	1 hr 38 mins
Orphans	TBA	Maxime Alexandre	Josh Ethier	Dark Castle Entertainment, Lionsgate Films, Eagle Vision, Republic Pictures, Gnosis Moving Pictures, Hero Squared Productions	Lionsgate Studios	TBA

== Reception ==
=== Box office and financial performance ===
Film	Box office gross			Box office ranking		Total home video sales	Budget	Worldwide net total income	Ref.
Film	North America	Other territories	Worldwide	All-time North America	All-time worldwide	Total home video sales	Budget	Worldwide net total income	Ref.
Orphan	$41,596,251	$37,173,177	$78,769,428	#2,297	#2,327	$16,379,048	$20,000,000	$75,148,476	
Orphan: First Kill	$5,413,227	$40,172,455	$45,585,682	#6,636	#3,452	$439,692	~$20,000,000	≥$26,025,374	
Orphans						TBA			—N/a

=== Critical and public response ===
Film	Rotten Tomatoes	Metacritic	CinemaScore
Orphan	60% (163 reviews)	42/100 (25 reviews)	B−
Orphan: First Kill	69% (150 reviews)	54/100 (27 reviews)	—N/a
Orphans			
