= List of Paramount Pictures films (2020–2029) =

The following is a list of films produced by Paramount Pictures and released (or scheduled to be released) in the 2020s.

All films listed are theatrical releases unless specified.

- A ‡ signifies a streaming release exclusively through Paramount+.
- A § signifies a simultaneous release to theaters and on Paramount+.
- A * signifies a streaming release through a third-party streaming service.

== Released ==
Release date	Title	Notes
January 10, 2020	Like a Boss	co-production with Artists First
January 31, 2020	The Rhythm Section	distribution outside Germany, Austria and China only; produced by Eon Productions, Global Road Entertainment and Danjaq LLC
January 31, 2020	Adú	Spanish film; distribution only; produced by Telecinco Cinema
February 14, 2020	Sonic the Hedgehog	co-production with Marza Animation Planet, Sega Sammy Group, Original Film and Blur Studio
May 19, 2020	Body Cam	distribution only; produced by Ace Entertainment, Paramount Players and BET Films
May 22, 2020	The Lovebirds *	co-production with MRC, 3 Arts Entertainment and Quinn's House; distributed by Netflix
June 5, 2020	Mighty Oak	distribution only; produced by Brookwell McNamara Entertainment
September 25, 2020	The Trial of the Chicago 7 *	studio credit only; co-production with Cross Creek Pictures, DreamWorks Pictures, Marc Platt Productions and ShivHans Pictures; distributed by Netflix
October 2, 2020	Spontaneous	distribution only; produced by Awesomeness Films and Jurassic Party Productions
October 16, 2020	Love and Monsters	U.S. distribution only; co-production with Entertainment One and 21 Laps Entertainment; distributed internationally by Netflix
October 23, 2020	Pixie	U.K., Irish, Australian and New Zealand distribution and North American video distribution only; produced by Fragile Films, Ingenious Media, Northern Ireland Screen and Endeavor Content
October 30, 2020	Spell	co-production with Paramount Players, LINK Entertainment and MC8 Entertainment
March 4, 2021	The SpongeBob Movie: Sponge on the Run ‡	co-production with Paramount Animation, Nickelodeon Movies, MRC, and United Plankton Pictures; distributed by Paramount+ (Note: Released in Canada and China theaters on August 14, 2020.)
March 5, 2021	Coming 2 America *	co-production with Eddie Murphy Productions, Misher Films and New Republic Pictures; distributed by Amazon Studios
April 23, 2021	The Space Between	distribution only; produced by Night & Day Pictures, Samuels Media Capital and Tangerine Pictures
April 30, 2021	Without Remorse *	co-production with Skydance Media, Weed Road Pictures, Outlier Society, New Republic Pictures and Midnight Radio Productions; distributed by Amazon Studios
May 28, 2021	A Quiet Place Part II	co-production with Platinum Dunes and Sunday Night Productions
June 10, 2021	Infinite ‡	co-production with di Bonaventura Pictures, Closest to the Hole Productions and New Republic Pictures; distributed by Paramount+
July 2, 2021	The Tomorrow War *	Chinese distribution only; co-production with Skydance Media and New Republic Pictures; distributed by Amazon Studios
July 23, 2021	Snake Eyes: G.I. Joe Origins	co-production with Metro-Goldwyn-Mayer, Skydance Media, Entertainment One, Hasbro Studios and Di Bonaventura Pictures
August 6, 2021	Bring Your Own Brigade ‡	distribution only; co-distribution with CBSN Films; produced by Topic Studios, XTR, Artemis Rising, Tree Tree Tree and Good ‘n Proper Production
August 20, 2021	Paw Patrol: The Movie §	distribution outside Canada only; co-production with Nickelodeon Movies and Spin Master Entertainment
October 29, 2021	Paranormal Activity: Next of Kin ‡	co-production with Paramount Players and Blumhouse Productions; distributed by Paramount+
November 10, 2021	Clifford the Big Red Dog §	distribution outside Canada, the U.K. and Ireland theatrically only; co-production with Entertainment One, The Kerner Entertainment Company, New Republic Pictures and Scholastic Entertainment
December 15, 2021	Rumble ‡	co-production with Paramount Animation, WWE Studios, Walden Media and Reel FX Animation Studios; distributed by Paramount+
January 14, 2022	Scream	distribution outside Scandinavia, Poland, Hungary, Romania, Bulgaria, the Czech Republic, Slovakia and Israel only; produced by Spyglass Media Group, Project X Entertainment and Radio Silence Productions
February 4, 2022	Jackass Forever	co-production with MTV Entertainment Studios, Dickhouse Productions and Gorilla Flicks
February 11, 2022	The In Between ‡ *	co-production with Paramount Players; distributed by Paramount+ in the United States and Netflix internationally
March 25, 2022	The Lost City	co-production with Fortis Films, 3dot Productions and Exhibit A Films
April 1, 2022	The Contractor	U.S. distribution only; produced by STXfilms, 30West, Thunder Road Films and Ingenious Media
April 8, 2022	Sonic the Hedgehog 2	co-production with Sega Sammy Group, Marza Animation Planet, Original Film and Blur Studio
May 13, 2022	Senior Year *	co-production with Paramount Players and Broken Road Productions; distributed by Netflix
May 27, 2022	Top Gun: Maverick	co-production with Skydance Media, TC Productions and Jerry Bruckheimer Films
June 17, 2022	Jerry & Marge Go Large ‡	co-production with Paramount Players, MRC and Levantine Films; distributed by Paramount+
June 24, 2022	Full of Grace	Spanish film; distribution only; produced by Misent Producciones, Mod Producciones and Mod Producciones
July 15, 2022	Paws of Fury: The Legend of Hank	distribution in North and Latin America, Australia, New Zealand, Spain, Andorra, Turkey, India, Japan, Malaysia, Thailand, the Philippines and Korea with Nickelodeon Movies only; produced by GFM Animation, Aniventure, Align, Brooksfilms, Flying Tigers Entertainment, HB Wink Animation and Cinesite
August 11, 2022	Laal Singh Chaddha	Indian film; co-production with Aamir Khan Productions and Viacom18 Studios
August 12, 2022	Secret Headquarters ‡	co-production with Jerry Bruckheimer Films; distributed by Paramount+
August 19, 2022	Orphan: First Kill §	U.S. distribution under Paramount Players only; produced by Dark Castle Entertainment, Entertainment One and Eagle Vision
August 24, 2022	Tad, the Lost Explorer and the Emerald Tablet	Spanish film; distribution only; produced by Telecinco Cinema, Lightbox Animation Studios, Ikiru Films, Anangu Grup and La Tadeopelícula AIE
September 16, 2022	Two Many Chefs	Spanish film; distribution only; produced by MOD Pictures and Kowalski Films
September 23, 2022	On the Come Up ‡	co-production with Paramount Players, Temple Hill Entertainment and State Street Pictures; distributed by Paramount+
September 30, 2022	Smile	co-production with Paramount Players and Temple Hill Entertainment
October 7, 2022	Significant Other ‡	co-production with Paramount Players; distributed by Paramount+
December 23, 2022	Babylon	co-production with C2 Motion Picture Group, Marc Platt Productions and Material Pictures
February 3, 2023	80 for Brady	distribution only; produced by 199 Productions and Fifth Season
March 10, 2023	Scream VI	distribution outside Scandinavia, Poland, Hungary, Romania, Bulgaria, the Czech Republic, Slovakia and Israel only; produced by Spyglass Media Group, Project X Entertainment and Radio Silence Productions
March 31, 2023	Dungeons & Dragons: Honor Among Thieves	distribution outside the U.K. and Ireland theatrically only; co-production with Entertainment One, Sierra Pictures and Hasbro Studios
April 10, 2023	Organ Trail	distribution only; produced by Tatterdemalion Pictures and Three Point Capital
June 9, 2023	Transformers: Rise of the Beasts	co-production with Skydance Media, Hasbro Studios, New Republic Pictures, Di Bonaventura Pictures, and Bay Films
June 30, 2023	Indiana Jones and the Dial of Destiny	studio credit only; co-production with Walt Disney Pictures and Lucasfilm; distributed by Walt Disney Studios Motion Pictures
July 12, 2023	Mission: Impossible – Dead Reckoning Part One	co-production with Skydance Media and TC Productions
August 2, 2023	Teenage Mutant Ninja Turtles: Mutant Mayhem	co-production with Nickelodeon Movies and Point Grey Pictures
September 8, 2023	My Animal	distribution outside Canada only; produced by XYZ Films, Photon Films, Good Movies, Band with Pictures, Jobpro Productions, Greenground Productions Vigilante and Crave
September 29, 2023	Paw Patrol: The Mighty Movie	distribution outside Canada only; co-production with Nickelodeon Movies and Spin Master Entertainment
October 6, 2023	Pet Sematary: Bloodlines ‡	co-production with Paramount Players, Di Bonaventura Pictures and Room 101, Inc.; distributed by Paramount+
October 20, 2023	Killers of the Flower Moon	theatrical and VOD distribution outside Italy only; produced by Apple Studios, Imperative Entertainment, Sikelia Productions and Appian Way Productions
October 27, 2023	Under the Boardwalk	distribution only; produced by Paramount Animation, New Republic Pictures and Big Kid Pictures
January 12, 2024	Mean Girls	co-production with Paramount Players, Broadway Video and Little Stranger
February 2, 2024	The Tiger's Apprentice ‡	co-production with Paramount Animation, Jane Startz Productions and New Republic Pictures; distributed by Paramount+
February 14, 2024	Bob Marley: One Love	co-production with Tuff Gong and Plan B Entertainment
April 12, 2024	Sweet Dreams	distribution only; produced by The Barnum Picture Company
April 12, 2024	Checkmates	Spanish film; distribution only; produced by Telecinco Cinema, Felicitas Media and Lightbox Animation Studios
May 17, 2024	IF	co-production with Sunday Night Productions and Maximum Effort
June 28, 2024	A Quiet Place: Day One	co-production with Platinum Dunes and Sunday Night Productions
August 13, 2024	Watchmen: Chapter I	international distribution only; co-production with Warner Bros. Animation and DC Entertainment; distributed by Warner Bros. Home Entertainment in North America
September 13, 2024	Here After	distribution only; produced by Artina Films, ClaRo Productions, Fenix Entertainment, Hopscotch Pictures, and Likely Story
September 20, 2024	Transformers One	co-production with Paramount Animation, Di Bonaventura Pictures, New Republic Pictures, Bay Films and Hasbro Entertainment
September 27, 2024	Apartment 7A ‡	co-production with Paramount Players, Sunday Night Productions and Platinum Dunes; distributed by Paramount+
October 18, 2024	Smile 2	co-production with Temple Hill Entertainment and Bad Feeling
November 22, 2024	Gladiator II	co-production with Scott Free Productions, Red Wagon Entertainment and Parkes+MacDonald Image Nation
November 25, 2024	Dear Santa ‡	co-production with Conundrum Entertainment; distributed by Paramount+
November 26, 2024	Watchmen: Chapter II	international distribution only; co-production with Warner Bros. Animation and DC Entertainment; distributed by Warner Bros. Home Entertainment in North America
December 13, 2024	September 5	co-distribution outside Germany, Austria and Switzerland with Republic Pictures only; produced by BerghausWöbke Filmproduktion, Constantin Film, Projected Picture Works and Edgar Reitz Filmproduktion
December 20, 2024	Sonic the Hedgehog 3	co-production with Sega Sammy Group, Original Film, Marza Animation Planet and Blur Studio
December 25, 2024	Better Man	North American, French and Japanese distribution only; produced by Footloose Productions, Zero Gravity Management, Jumpy Cow Pictures and Rocket Science
February 14, 2025	Heart Eyes	international distribution outside Scandinavia, Poland, Hungary, Romania, Bulgaria, the Czech Republic, Slovakia and Israel with Republic Pictures only; produced by Spyglass Media Group and Divide/Conquer; distributed in North America by Sony Pictures Releasing under Screen Gems
March 14, 2025	Novocaine	distribution only; produced by Infrared Pictures, Safehouse Pictures and Circle of Confusion
May 23, 2025	Mission: Impossible – The Final Reckoning	co-production with Skydance Media and TC Productions
July 17, 2025	Friendship	international distribution under Republic Pictures only; produced by Fifth Season and BoulderLight Pictures
July 18, 2025	Smurfs	co-production with Paramount Animation, Marcy Media Films, LAFIG Belgium and Peyo Company
August 1, 2025	The Naked Gun	co-production with Fuzzy Door Productions
August 14, 2025	The Mortimers	Spanish film; distribution only; produced by Telecinco Cinema, Pokeepsie Films and Pokeepsietxea
October 10, 2025	Vicious ‡	co-production with Atlas Independent and Unbroken Pictures; distributed by Paramount+
October 10, 2025	Roofman	North American, U.K. and Irish distribution only; produced by Miramax, FilmNation Entertainment, Limelight, High Frequency Entertainment, Hunting Lane and 51 Entertainment
October 24, 2025	Regretting You	distribution outside Germany, Austria, Switzerland and the CIS only; produced by Constantin Film, Harbinger Pictures, Frayed Pages Entertainment and Heartbones Entertainment
November 14, 2025	The Running Man	co-production with Kinberg Genre and Complete Fiction; rights licensed to Dutch FilmWorks for the Benelux and Kino Swiat for Poland
December 19, 2025	The SpongeBob Movie: Search for SquarePants	co-production with Paramount Animation, Nickelodeon Movies, MRC, and United Plankton Pictures (Note: Released in select international theaters on December 18, 2025.)
January 9, 2026	Primate	co-production with 18hz Productions
February 27, 2026	Scream 7	distribution outside Scandinavia, Poland, Hungary, the Czech Republic, Slovakia, Romania, Bulgaria and Israel only; produced by Spyglass Media Group, Project X Entertainment, Outerbanks Entertainment and Radio Silence Productions
May 8, 2026	Billie Eilish – Hit Me Hard and Soft: The Tour (Live in 3D)	distribution only; produced by Darkroom Records, Interscope Films and Lightstorm Earth
May 20, 2026	Jack Ryan: Ghost War *	co-production with Metro-Goldwyn-Mayer, Sunday Night Productions and Big Indie Pictures; distributed by Amazon MGM Studios via Amazon Prime Video
May 22, 2026	Passenger	co-production with 18hz Productions and Coin Operated
June 5, 2026	Savage House	distribution only; produced by Record Player Films and Deluge Pictures
June 5, 2026	Scary Movie	distribution only; produced by Miramax, Wayans Bros. Entertainment and Original Film
June 26, 2026	Jackass: Best and Last	co-production with MTV Entertainment Studios and Dickhouse Productions
July 24, 2026	Avatar Aang: The Last Airbender §	co-production with Nickelodeon Movies and Avatar Studios; distributed by Paramount+
August 14, 2026	Paw Patrol: The Dino Movie	distribution outside Canada only; co-production with Paramount Animation, Nickelodeon Movies and Spin Master Entertainment
August 26, 2026	Tad and the Magic Lamp	Spanish film; distribution only; produced by Telecinco Cinema, Lightbox Animation Studios, Ikiru Films, Anangu Grup and La Tadeopelícula AIE
September 4, 2026	By Any Means	U.S. distribution only; produced by Hammerstone Studios, Thunder Road, Freedom Principle, North.Five.Six, Bright White Light, Closest to the Hole Productions and Leverage Entertainment
September 25, 2026	Heart of the Beast	co-production with Temple Hill Entertainment, Crave Films and Wild Chickens Productions
October 16, 2026	Street Fighter	distribution outside China only; produced by Legendary Pictures, Capcom and On the Roam
November 13, 2026	Ebenezer	co-production with Black Label Media, Motel Mojave, Wattsco and IN.2 Films

== Upcoming ==
Release date	Title	Notes	Production status
November 25, 2026	Focker-in-Law	international distribution only; co-production with Universal Pictures, Tribeca Enterprises, Red Hour Productions and Particular Pictures	Completed
December 23, 2026	The Angry Birds Movie 3	distribution only; produced by Rovio Entertainment, Sega Sammy Group, Prime Focus Studios, One Cool Films, Flywheel Media and Dentsu	Completed
December 25, 2026	Mr. Irrelevant	co-production with Skydance Sports, Blackjack Films and Megamix	Completed
January 7, 2027	Zac Power	Australian and New Zealand distribution only; produced by Flying Bark Productions and Cheeky Little Media	Post-production
January 15, 2027	Children of Blood and Bone	co-production with Temple Hill Entertainment and Sunswept Entertainment	Completed
January 29, 2027	The Rescue	co-production with Spyglass Media Group and Hideout Pictures	Post-production
February 26, 2027	K-Pop: The Debut	co-production from Hybe America and Epic Magazine	Post-production
March 19, 2027	Sonic the Hedgehog 4	co-production with Sega Sammy Group, Original Film, Marza Animation Planet and Blur Studio	Post-production
April 9, 2027	Boys for Life	distribution only; produced by Paramount Primal	Filming
June 11, 2027	Possession	co-production with Bad Feeling, Icki Eneo Arlo and Vertigo Entertainment	Filming
July 16, 2027	Crawl 2		Filming
July 30, 2027	A Quiet Place Part III	co-production with Platinum Dunes and Sunday Night Productions	Post-production
August 13, 2027	Untitled Teenage Mutant Ninja Turtles: Mutant Mayhem sequel	co-production with Paramount Animation, Nickelodeon Movies and Point Grey Pictures	In production
August 20, 2027	Get Lite	co-production with Khalabo Ink Society, A Seed and Wings Productions and OFFBRND	Filming
August 27, 2027	Molepeople	distribution only; produced by Paramount Primal and Blumhouse Atomic	Pre-production
October 22, 2027	Paranormal Activity	co-production with Blumhouse Productions, Atomic Monster, Solana Films and Room 101	Filming
November 12, 2027	Tomorrow, and Tomorrow, and Tomorrow	co-production with Temple Hill Entertainment	Pre-production
January 14, 2028	Untitled Longlegs film	co-production with Range Media Partners, Phobos and C2	Pre-production
February 4, 2028	Heart Eyes 2	distribution outside Scandinavia, Poland, Hungary, Romania, the Czech Republic, Slovakia, Bulgaria and Israel only; produced by Spyglass Media Group and Divide/Conquer	Pre-production
May 12, 2028	One Italian Summer	co-production with Temple Hill Entertainment and TFC Productions	Pre-production
June 2, 2028	Untitled Days of Thunder sequel	co-production with Jerry Bruckheimer Films and TC Productions	Pre-production
June 30, 2028	Call of Duty	co-production with Xbox Pictures, Activision, Film 44 and Bosque Ranch Productions	Pre-production
October 13, 2028	Freddy the 13th	distribution only; produced by Paramount Animation	Pre-production
October 20, 2028	Untitled G.I. Joe film	co-production with Hasbro Entertainment, Di Bonaventura Pictures and Rough House Pictures	Pre-production
November 3, 2028	Untitled Duffer Brothers film	co-production with Upside Down Pictures	Pre-production
November 17, 2028	Untitled Teenage Mutant Ninja Turtles film	co-production with Nickelodeon Movies and Original Film	Pre-production
December 22, 2028	Untitled Sonic spin-off film	co-production with Sega Sammy Group, Original Film, Marza Animation Planet and Blur Studio	Pre-production

=== Undated films ===
Release date	Title	Notes	Production status
2029	Untitled fourth Paw Patrol film	distribution outside Canada only; co-production with Paramount Animation, Nickelodeon Movies and Spin Master Entertainment	Pre-production
TBA	The Gangster, the Cop and the Devil	co-production with Blumhouse Productions, Atomic Monster, Big Punch Global, Balboa Productions, B&C Group and BA Entertainment	Pre-production
TBA	High Side	co-production with Chernin Entertainment	Pre-production
TBA	Untitled The Adventures of Tintin sequel	co-production with Nickelodeon Movies, Amblin Entertainment, WingNut Films and The Kennedy/Marshall Company	Pre-production
TBA	Untitled Damien Chazelle film	co-production with Wild Chickens Productions	Post-production
TBA	Whitney Springs	co-production with PGLang and Park County	Post-production

=== In development ===
Title	Notes
American Girl	co-production with Mattel Studios and Temple Hill Entertainment
The Arcane Arts	co-production with Temple Hill Entertainment
BadAsstronauts	co-production with Broken Road Productions
Bald Eagles	co-production with Range Media Partners
Ballistic	co-production with GoldDay
Bella	co-production with 87Eleven Entertainment
Beyblade	co-production with Jerry Bruckheimer Films
Blood Count	co-production with SpringHill Company
Boy Band	co-production with Maximum Effort and 21 Laps Entertainment
Cosmic Motors	co-production with Skydance Animation
C.O.S.M.O.S.	co-production with Paramount Animation
Diya	co-production with Paramount Animation, GoldDay and Good Karma Productions
Dropz	co-production with Paramount Animation and Gloria Sanchez Productions
Familiar	co-production with 18hz Productions
Fashionista	distribution only; produced by Paramount Players, Ethea Entertainment, and Kellagio Entertainment
The Final Girl Support Group	co-production with Double Dream and Aperture Entertainment
The Fuckboat	co-production with Barnstorm
Gladiator III	co-production with Scott Free Productions, Red Wagon Entertainment and Parkes+MacDonald Image Nation
Harbinger	co-production with Valiant Entertainment, Roth/Kirschenbaum Films, and Original Film
Here Be Monsters	co-production with Scott Free Productions
Hit the Gas	co-production with Original Film
Houdini	co-production with Di Bonaventura Pictures
The Island	co-production with Day Zero Productions and Mainstay Entertainment
Jaguar	co-production with Skydance Animation
Kill Them All	co-production with The Saw Mill and Oni Press
The League of Gentlemen	co-production with Future Artists Entertainment
A Little Slice of Hell	co-production with Maximum Effort and Assemble Media
Major Matt Mason	co-production with Mattel Studios, Playtone and Weed Road Pictures
The Midnight Library	distribution outside the U.K., Ireland, Australia, New Zealand, France, Germany, Austria, Switzerland, Italy, Scandinavia, the Benelux, Poland, Russia and South Africa only; produced by StudioCanal and Blueprint Pictures
Mighty Mouse	co-production with Paramount Animation and Maximum Effort
Muttnik	co-production with Paramount Animation and Imagine Entertainment
The Naughty List	co-production with Paramount Animation and Troublemaker Studios
Nevermoor	co-production with Goddard Textiles
An Officer and a Gentleman	co-production with Temple Hill Entertainment
Once Upon a Motorcycle Dude	co-production with Paramount Animation
Over Asking	
Pumpkinhead	co-production with Paramount Players
Quinceanerx	distribution only; produced by Paramount Players
Rabbit Rabbit Rabbit	co-production with Blumhouse Atomic and 3 Arts Entertainment
Rachel Nevada	co-production with Maximum Effort
Rainbow Six	co-production with Skydance Media, Weed Road Pictures, Outlier Society, and 87Eleven Entertainment
Real Pigeons Fight Crime	co-production with Paramount Animation
Recovery Agent	co-production with Carol Mendelsohn Productions and Pilot Wave
Red Rising	co-production with about:blank
Rosaline Palmer Takes the Cake	co-production with Original Film
Rush Hour 4	distribution only; produced by New Line Cinema and Eagle Pictures
The Saint	co-production with Di Bonaventura Pictures
Scream 8	co-production with Spyglass Media Group, Project X Entertainment and Radio Silence Productions
Silencer	co-production with NeoText Corporation and Di Bonaventura Pictures
Sleepy Hollow	co-production with Broken Road Productions
Smile 3	co-production with Temple Hill Entertainment
The Stand	co-production with Cross Creek Pictures
Sunset Boulevard	co-production with LW Entertainment and Trillium Productions
Superworld	co-production with Paramount Animation and Temple Hill Entertainment
Susie Thunder	co-production with Epic Magazine
Swan Lake	co-production with Paramount Animation and Temple Hill Entertainment
Sweet Spot	distribution only; produced by Paramount Primal
Thicc	co-production with Broken Road Productions, New York and Vox Media Studios
To Catch a Thief	co-production with Pilot Wave and Original Film
Tower Defense	distribution only; produced by Paramount Primal
The Traveler	co-production with Indivisible Productions
The Troop	distribution only; produced by Paramount Primal and Lyrical Media
Untitled Clifford the Big Red Dog sequel	co-production with eOne Films, The Kerner Entertainment Company, New Republic Pictures, and Scholastic Entertainment
Untitled Cyberpunk 2077 film	co-production with CD Projekt Red and Di Bonaventura Pictures
Untitled Dave Boyle film	co-production with 18hz Productions
Untitled Face/Off sequel	co-production with Original Film and Permut Presentations
Untitled fourth Cloverfield film	co-production with Bad Robot
Untitled H. G. Wells film	co-production with OddBall Entertainment
Untitled Hawaii Five-O film	
Untitled How to Lose a Guy in 10 Days sequel	U.S. and Canadian distribution only; co-production with Imperative Entertainment, Rocket Science and Shiny Penny
Untitled The Italian Job sequel	
Untitled James Vanderbilt film	co-production with Vinson Films and Project X Entertainment
Untitled Jimmy Neutron: Boy Genius sequel	co-production with Paramount Animation and Nickelodeon Movies
Untitled The Longest Yard remake	co-production with Gunpowder & Sky
Untitled MASH film	
Untitled Medieval Times film	co-production with Medieval Times Entertainment
Untitled Mindy Kaling comedy	co-production with Paramount Animation
Untitled A Nightmare on Elm Street film	U.S. distribution only; produced by Paramount Primal and New Line Cinema; distributed internationally by Warner Bros. Pictures
Untitled Rugrats live-action film	co-production with Paramount Players, Nickelodeon Movies and Klasky Csupo
Untitled Spice Girls film	co-production with Paramount Animation and 19 Entertainment
Untitled Star Trek film	co-production with GoldDay
Untitled Survivor film	co-production with Paramount Animation, Castaway Productions, Survivor Productions, LLC and CBS Studios
Untitled The Tomorrow War sequel	co-production with Amazon MGM Studios and Skydance Media
Untitled third Top Gun film	co-production with Skydance Media, TC Productions and Jerry Bruckheimer Films
Untitled TikTok horror film	co-production with Original Film
Untitled Transformers film	co-production with Hasbro Entertainment, Bayhem Films and Di Bonaventura Pictures
Vertigo	co-production with Davis Entertainment and Team Downey
Wilderness Reform	co-production with Lab Brew and 12:01 Films
Winters Games	co-production with Star Thrower Entertainment
World War Z 2	co-production with Plan B Entertainment
Yokai Samba	co-production with Paramount Animation and Nickelodeon Movies
You Should Be Dancing	co-production with Amblin Entertainment, GK Films, Scott Free Productions and Sister
Your Name	distribution outside Japan only; co-production with Bad Robot and Toho
