= Orphan (2009 film) =

Film by Jaume Collet-Serra

- US theatrical release poster
- Directed by: Jaume Collet-Serra
- Screenplay by: David Leslie Johnson
- Story by: Alex Mace
- Produced by: Joel Silver; Susan Downey; Jennifer Davisson Killoran; Leonardo DiCaprio
- Starring: Vera Farmiga; Peter Sarsgaard; Isabelle Fuhrman; CCH Pounder; Jimmy Bennett
- Cinematography: Jeff Cutter
- Edited by: Tim Alverson
- Music by: John Ottman
- Production companies: Dark Castle Entertainment; Appian Way Productions
- Distributed by: Warner Bros. Pictures
- Release dates: July 21, 2009 (Westwood); July 24, 2009 (United States)
- Running time: 123 minutes
- Countries: United States; Canada; Germany; France
- Language: English
- Budget: $20 million
- Box office: $78.8 million

Orphan is a 2009 psychological horror film directed by Jaume Collet-Serra and written by David Leslie Johnson from a story by Alex Mace. The film stars Vera Farmiga, Peter Sarsgaard, Isabelle Fuhrman, CCH Pounder, and Jimmy Bennett. The plot centers on a couple who, after the loss of their stillborn child, adopt a psychopathic nine-year-old girl with a mysterious past.

The film is an international co-production between the United States, Canada, Germany and France. It was produced by Joel Silver and Susan Downey of Dark Castle Entertainment, and Leonardo DiCaprio and Jennifer Davisson Killoran of Appian Way Productions. Principal photography for the film took place in Canada, in the cities of St. Thomas, Toronto, Port Hope, and Montreal.

Orphan was released by Warner Bros. Pictures in the United States and Canada on July 24, 2009. It was released in Germany on October 22, and in France on December 30. The film received mixed reviews from critics and grossed $78.8 million worldwide. The film successfully launched its titular film series starring Fuhrman, including the prequels titled Orphan: First Kill (2022), and Orphans in production.

== Plot ==
In Hamden, Connecticut, Kate and John Coleman's marriage is strained after the stillbirth of their third child, Jessica, whose loss is particularly hard on Kate, a recovering alcoholic. She and John then decide to adopt a 9-year-old Russian girl, Esther, from St. Mariana's Home for Girls, a local orphanage. Their 6-year-old deaf daughter, Max, embraces Esther, but their 12-year-old son, Daniel, is far less welcoming.

One night, Kate and John begin to have sex until Esther interrupts them. Kate becomes suspicious when Esther expresses far more knowledge of sex than expected of a child her age. Esther then exhibits hostile behavior in front of Max and Daniel, such as killing an injured pigeon and breaking the ankle of a bullying classmate named Brenda. Sister Abigail, the head of the orphanage, visits the household, warning Kate and John that tragic events and incidents occur around Esther, including the house fire that killed her previous adoptive family. When Abigail attempts to leave, Esther causes her to crash her car on the road and then bludgeons her to death with a hammer. She forces Max to help her move the body and then hides the evidence in Daniel's treehouse. Daniel sees them at the treehouse, and later that night, Esther interrogates him about what he saw, threatening to castrate him if he tells his parents.

As Kate becomes further convinced about Esther's unusual behavior, John believes she is being paranoid and tells Esther to do something nice for Kate. Esther rips out the flowers from Jessica's grave and gives them to Kate as a bouquet. Kate is horrified and grabs Esther's arm in distress, asserting that she did this on purpose. That night, Esther breaks her own arm with a vice, and falsely blames Kate, causing further strife in Kate and John's marriage. The next day, Esther releases the brake in the car, causing it to roll into oncoming traffic with Max inside. She also points out the wine she found in the kitchen, causing John and Kate's therapist to suggest Kate return to rehab, with John threatening to leave her and take the children if she refuses. Kate discovers that Esther came from a mental hospital named the Saarne Institute, and the orphanage she claims she was from has no record of her.

When Daniel learns about Sister Abigail's death from Max and searches the treehouse, Esther, having heard their conversation last night, sets it on fire with him inside. He falls from the treehouse while trying to escape, causing him to fall unconscious from the impact. Esther uses this opportunity to try to kill him, but is thwarted by Max. Daniel is seriously injured, and while in the ICU in the hospital, Esther tries to asphyxiate him, stopping his heart, but the doctors come in time to revive him. Kate, enraged about what happened and believing Esther was involved, slaps her before being restrained and sedated. That night, Esther dresses provocatively and attempts to seduce John, and after realizing that Kate was right about her, he angrily threatens to send her back to the orphanage. At the hospital, Kate is contacted by Dr. Värava of the Saarne Institute and learns that Esther is actually a 33-year-old Estonian woman named Leena Klammer. She has hypopituitarism, a rare hormonal disorder that stunted her physical growth and caused proportional dwarfism, and she has spent most of her life posing as a little girl. He states that she has killed at least seven people and was one of the institute's most violent inmates, being kept restrained at all times. She also tricked a family in Estonia into adopting her, and when she failed to seduce the father, she killed him and the rest of the family, burning the house down to destroy the evidence.

While Kate is talking to Dr. Värava, Leena furiously removes her makeup that makes her look childlike; the ribbons she wears around her neck and wrists conceal the livid scars she received from trying to break out of her restraints. She also removes her prosthetic childlike teeth, revealing her real, rotting teeth, and destroys her room. When the power goes out and Leena disappears, John enters her room and uses the aquarium blacklight to find her hidden, violent paintings. After tearing them off the wall, he discovers pornographic images resembling himself and Leena painted on the walls. She then attacks him downstairs and stabs him to death.

Kate rushes home and, after finding John's body, searches the house desperately to find Max. Leena attempts to shoot her, wounding her arm. After Leena opens fire on Max in the greenhouse, Kate breaks through the greenhouse roof and knocks her unconscious by landing on her. Kate and Max flee as police arrive, but Leena attacks them near the frozen pond, hurling them onto the ice. As the two women engage in a violent struggle, Max tries to shoot Leena herself but misses, hitting and shattering the ice and causing her and Kate to be sent underwater. Kate begins to climb out with Leena clinging to her legs. Leena reverts to her Esther persona, begging "Mommy" not to let her die, while hiding the knife behind her back. Kate retorts "I'm not your fucking mommy!" angrily and kills her by kicking her in the face, snapping her neck and sinking her body. Kate and Max are met by police.

== Cast ==
- Vera Farmiga as Kate
- Peter Sarsgaard as John
- Isabelle Fuhrman as Esther
- CCH Pounder as Sister Abigail
- Jimmy Bennett as Daniel
- Margo Martindale as Dr. Browning
- Karel Roden as Dr. Värava
- Aryana Engineer as Max
- Rosemary Dunsmore as Grandma Barbara
- Genelle Williams as Sister Judith
- Jamie Young as Brenda

== Production ==
Vera Farmiga and Peter Sarsgaard were cast in main roles in late November 2007. Principal photography for the film took place in Canada, in the cities of St. Thomas, Toronto, Port Hope, and Montreal.

Esther of Estonia was inspired by the May 2007 media coverage of 34-year-old Barbora Skrlová, a woman impersonating an orphan who took over her first adoptive family, manipulated the mother and her sister to chain and starve both their sons/nephews, and ran away from the police when caught. She eventually was found impersonating Adam, a thirteen-year-old boy who had gone missing in Norway.

== Release ==
Orphan had its world premiere in Westwood, Los Angeles on July 21, 2009. That same month, it screened at the Fantasia International Film Festival. Warner Bros. Pictures originally scheduled the film for an US and Canadian theatrical release in November 2008, but later moved it back to July 24, 2009. Warner Bros. also distributed the film in France on December 30, 2009. It was released by Optimum Releasing in the United Kingdom on August 7, 2009. In Germany, the film was distributed by Kinowelt Filmverleih on October 22, 2009.

Orphan was released on DVD and Blu-ray on October 27, 2009, in the United States by Warner Home Video and in the United Kingdom on November 27, 2009.

== Reception ==
=== Box office ===
The film opened in the 4th spot at the box office, making a total of $12.8 million, behind G-Force, Harry Potter and the Half-Blood Prince, and The Ugly Truth. The film went on to gross a worldwide total of $78.3 million.

=== Critical response ===
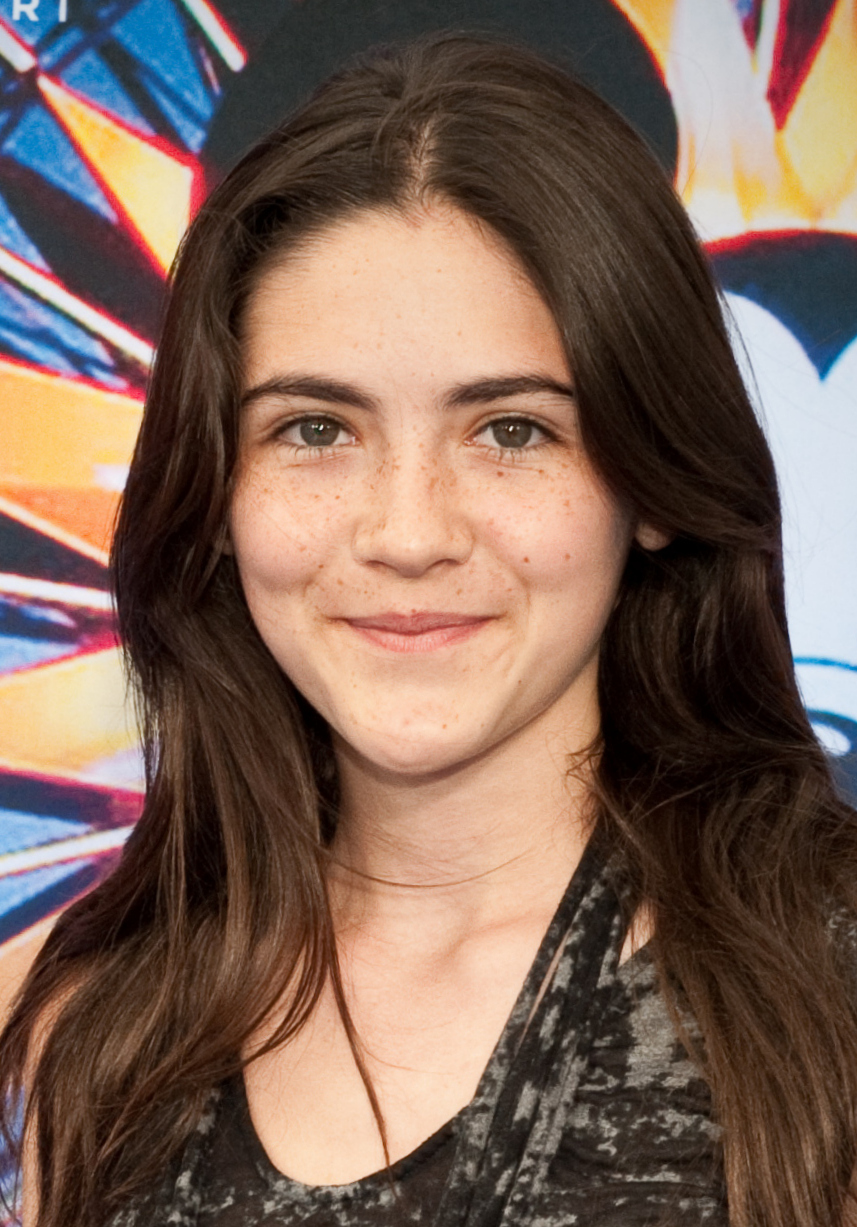
Isabelle Fuhrman's performance as Esther was praised.

On the review aggregator website Rotten Tomatoes, 60% of 163 critics' reviews are positive, with an average rating of 5.7/10. The website's consensus reads: "While it has moments of dark humor and the requisite scares, Orphan fails to build on its interesting premise and degenerates into a formulaic, sleazy horror/thriller." Metacritic, which uses a weighted average, assigned the film a score of 42 out of 100, based on 25 critics, indicating "mixed or average" reviews. Audiences polled by CinemaScore gave the film an average grade of "B−" on an A+ to F scale.

Roger Ebert of the Chicago Sun-Times gave Orphan 3 1/2 stars out of 4, writing: "After seeing 'Orphan,' I now realize that Damien of 'The Omen' was a model child. The Demon Seed was a bumper crop. Rosemary would have been happy to have this baby. Here is a shamelessly effective horror film based on the most diabolical of movie malefactors, a child. You want a good horror film about a child from hell, you got one." Mick LaSalle of the San Francisco Chronicle also gave a positive review, commenting: "Orphan provides everything you might expect in a psycho-child thriller but with such excess and exuberance that it still has the power to surprise." Todd McCarthy of Variety was less impressed, writing: "Teasingly enjoyable rubbish through the first hour, Orphan becomes genuine trash during its protracted second half."

Manohla Dargis of The New York Times wrote: "Actors have to eat like the rest of us, if evidently not as much, but you still have to wonder how the independent film mainstays Vera Farmiga and Peter Sarsgaard ended up wading through Orphan and, for the most part, not laughing." Owen Gleiberman of Entertainment Weekly gave the film a D+ score, noting: "Orphan isn't scary – it's garish and plodding." Keith Phipps from The A.V. Club wrote: "If director Jaume Collet-Serra set out to make a parody of horror film clichés, he succeeded brilliantly."

The film's content, depicting a murderous adoptee, was not well received by some adoption groups. The controversy caused filmmakers to change a line in one of their trailers from: "It must be difficult to love an adopted child as much as your own" to "I don't think Mommy likes me very much". Melissa Fay Greene of The Daily Beast commented: "The movie Orphan comes directly from this unexamined place in popular culture. Esther's shadowy past includes Eastern Europe; she appears normal and sweet but quickly turns violent and cruel, especially toward her mother. These are clichés. This is the baggage with which we saddle abandoned, orphaned, or disabled children given a fresh start at family life."

== Prequel ==
In February 2020, development of a prequel film was announced, titled Esther, with William Brent Bell signed on as director from a script by David Coggeshall. The project will be a joint-venture between eOne and Dark Castle Entertainment and will be distributed by Paramount Pictures under its Players division. Alex Mace, Hal Sadoff, Ethan Erwin and James Tomlinson will produce the film, with David Leslie Johnson as an executive producer. Production was set to begin summer 2020. In October 2020, Julia Stiles said she was about to start working on the film. In November, the title was changed to Orphan: First Kill, with Isabelle Fuhrman returning to star in the film. The film was released on August 19, 2022.
