= Orphans (upcoming film) =

- Directed by: William Brent Bell
- Screenplay by: David Coggeshall
- Based on: Characters by Alex Mace
- Produced by: Alex Mace; David Leslie Johnson-McGoldrick; Norman Golightly
- Starring: Isabelle Fuhrman; Stephen Moyer; Susanne Wuest
- Cinematography: Maxime Alexandre
- Edited by: Josh Ethier
- Production companies: Dark Castle Entertainment; Eagle Vision; Gnosis Moving Pictures; Hero Squared Productions
- Distributed by: Republic Pictures (United States)
- Countries: United States; Canada
- Language: English

Orphans is an upcoming psychological horror film directed by William Brent Bell and written by David Coggeshall. It is the third installment in the Orphan film series, and is a prequel to both Orphan (2009) and Orphan: First Kill (2022). It stars Isabelle Fuhrman, reprising her role as Esther.

== Cast ==
- Isabelle Fuhrman as Esther / Leena
- Stephen Moyer
- Susanne Wuest
- Simon Man

== Production ==
=== Development ===
In August 2022, when asked about his approach to making the sequel, William Brent Bell stated that there would need to be a third film in order for Orphan (2009) to be considered a franchise. Later, Isabelle Fuhrman expressed interest in continuing to portray Leena/Esther in additional films. Bell stated that should Orphan: First Kill (2022) be successful, a third film could be developed. The filmmaker expressed interest in exploring a darker third installment that would complete a full story of Leena Klammer/Esther Coleman, while stating that there may be multiple sequels: "...Isabelle [Fuhrman] is so passionate about the character – [she] can play this character forever… there's a lot to that character, and I think in the future stories, she would probably become a bit more cold-hearted again. Fuhrman confirmed that discussions for a third film, among the creatives and studios are ongoing, stating that there would not be another "13 years this time around" before a sequel is developed. In December 2023, the filmmaker confirmed that a third film is in active development, with Fuhrman reprising the titular role.

In November 2024, Dark Castle confirmed that a third film had been green lit by Lionsgate Films, which would launch the project at the American Film Market. Brent Bell and David Coggeshall is set to return as director and screenwriter respectively, while Isabelle Fuhrman reprises her role as Leena Klammer / Esther Coleman. Fuhrman later expressed excitement, stating that the quality of the script is what convinced her to sign on to the project. By April 2025, the actress stated that the next installment will be an 'inbetweenquel' as it will depict separate events that take place after Orphan as well as the prequel Orphan: First Kill. In May 2025, Fuhrman stated Coggeshall was continuing to write the script, while expressing excitement for the realization of the movie for the fans. Praising Coggeshall's script, she assured that she believes the movie would be great.

Later, it was clarified that Orphans will be a prequel to both movies. Alex Mace, David Leslie Johnson-McGoldrick and Norman Golighty serve as producers; Fuhrmann, Kelly Gallagher and Victor Moyers are executive producers, while Robert Bell, Josh Ethier, Jonathan Halperyn and Daniel Kresmerywhile serve as co-producers. The project is a joint-venture production between Lionsgate, Dark Castle Entertainment, Republic Pictures, Gnosis Moving Pictures, and Hero Squared Productions.

=== Casting ===
Isabelle Fuhrman reprises her lead role as Leena, who frequently uses the alias "Esther". In December 2025, Stephen Moyer, Susanne Wuest and Simon Man were announced to feature in supporting roles.

=== Filming ===
Under the working title Orphans, principal photography began in Budapest on November 5, 2025, with Maxime Alexandre as the cinematographer; with production wrapping on December 12.

== Release ==
In December 2025, Republic Pictures, whose sister company Paramount Players had distributed Orphan: First Kill, acquired U.S. distribution rights to Orphans.
