= Deborah Kampmeier =

American film director

- Born: Deborah Jane Kampmeier; November 21, 1964 (age 61); Chattanooga, Tennessee, United States
- Occupations: Filmmaker, producer
- Years active: 2003–present
- Notable work: Hounddog, Virgin, Split

Deborah Jane Kampmeier (born November 21, 1964) is an American filmmaker and producer best known for writing and directing films such as Virgin (2003), Hounddog (2007), Split (2016) and Tape (2020).

== Early life ==
Deborah Kampmeier was born in Chattanooga, Tennessee. She began her career in theater as an actress after training at the National Shakespeare Conservatory from 1983 to 1985. She went to prom with actor RuPaul. Kampmeier taught acting in NYC for 20 years at such institutions as NYU, Stella Adler Studios, Michael Howard Studios, Playwrights Horizons and The National Shakespeare Conservatory.

== Films ==
Kampmeier made her first feature film Virgin (2003), starring Elisabeth Moss and Robin Wright Penn, on a budget of $65,000. The film picked up awards at the Hamptons Film Festival, Sedona Film Festival, Santa Fe Film Festival, and Female Eye Film Festival. The film earned two nominations at the 19th Independent Spirit Awards, the John Cassavetes Award for Kampmeier and Best Female Lead for Moss.

Her second feature film, Hounddog (2007), starring Dakota Fanning and Piper Laurie, debuted at the 2007 Sundance Film Festival, where it was nominated for the Grand Jury Prize. The film was met with significant controversy due to a rape scene featuring a then twelve-year-old Fanning. This sequence caused film critics and activists to condemn the film, with many deeming it "child abuse". Bill Donohue, president of the Catholic League for Religious and Civil Rights, called for a federal investigation against Kampmeier, with Donohue stating that the film was breaking anti-pornography laws and that Fanning was being exploited.

Sundance Film Festival organizer, Geoffrey Gilmore, praised Kampmeier for trying to cover "challenging material". Kampmeier responded to the criticism by explaining that Fanning and the two other child actors in the film, Cody Hanford and Isabelle Fuhrman, were only acting and decried the attacks against "my mother, my agent ... my teacher, who were all on the set that day" by critics. Fanning herself stated, "I'm not going through anything like that, it's just my character. It's just another scene and wasn't any different from anything else I've done" and said that the controversy was "blown out of proportion".

Kampmeier released her third feature film, Split (2016), which premiered at the Sarasota Film Festival. The film follows a young actress who is split from her full self when she falls in love with a mask-maker and the relationship takes on dark subtleties. It stars Amy Ferguson, Morgan Spector, and Kampmeier's daughter, Sophia Oppenheim, in her film debut. Indie Outlook described the film as "an arrestingly raw howl of fury at the global stigmatization of female sexuality.

In 2026, it was announced that Kampmeier is writing and directing a drama film titled Holy Whore. Filming was expected to take place in Mexico starting late summer, but no further updates have been released as of November.

== Themes ==
Kampmeier's films have been noted for their strong feminist themes, as all of her films have featured female protagonists. Speaking of her debut film Virgin in an interview with Jan Lisa Huttner, Kampmeier noted that "one of the criticisms [she] hear[s] a lot is that there are no sympathetic male characters in Virgin". She also mentioned the difficulties she experienced in marketing the film after explaining to film executives that her target audience was women. She was told that "women aren't a ‘demographic,' at least not a demographic you can market to. Boyfriends and husbands make the decisions". Kampmeier concluded that the roadblocks she faced in finding a distributor for the film cemented her desire to focus on the experiences of being a woman in her subsequent films.

== Television ==
In 2019, Kampmeier was selected by director Ava DuVernay to direct an episode of the television series, Queen Sugar. This marked Kampmeier's television directorial debut. She has also directed Tales of the Walking Dead, Star Trek: Picard, and The Gilded Age.

== Filmography ==
=== Film ===
Year	Title	Credited as			Notes
Year	Title	Director	Writer	Producer	Notes
2003	Virgin	Yes	Yes	Yes	
2007	Hounddog	Yes	Yes	Yes	
2015	Ramona	No	No	Yes	Short film
2016	Peel	Yes	Yes	Yes	Short film
2016	Split	Yes	Yes	Yes	
2016	Without Grace	Yes	No	No	Short film
2020	Tape	Yes	Yes	No	Also editor

=== Television ===
Year	Title	Notes
2019	Queen Sugar	"All The Borders"
2020	Cherish the Day	"Oasis", "Basis"
2021	Clarice	"Add-a-Bead", "Silence Is Purgatory"
2021–23	FBI: International	"Secrets as Weapons", "American Optimism", "He Who Speaks Dies"
2022	Star Trek: Discovery	"The Galactic Barrier"
2022	Tales of the Walking Dead	"La Doña"
2023	Star Trek: Picard	"Dominion", "Surrender"
2023	Harlan Coben's Shelter	"See Me Feel Me Touch Me Heal Me", "Candy's Room"
2023	The Gilded Age	"Some Sort of Trick", "His Grace the Duke"
2024	Outer Range	"Everybody Hurts", "All the World's a Stage"
2024	Brilliant Minds	"The Blackout Bride"
