= Hounddog (film) =

- Theatrical release poster
- Directed by: Deborah Kampmeier
- Written by: Deborah Kampmeier
- Produced by: Deborah Kampmeier; Robin Wright Penn; Raye Dowell; Jen Gatien; Terry Leonard
- Starring: Dakota Fanning; Piper Laurie; David Morse; Robin Wright Penn; Isabelle Fuhrman
- Cinematography: Jim Denault; Edward Lachman
- Edited by: Sabine Hoffmann
- Music by: Gisburg
- Production companies: Empire Film Group; Hannover House
- Release date: January 22, 2007 (Sundance)
- Running time: 102 minutes
- Country: United States
- Language: English
- Budget: <$4 million
- Box office: $131,961

Hounddog is a 2007 American Southern Gothic coming-of-age drama film written, directed, and produced by Deborah Kampmeier. The film stars Dakota Fanning, Piper Laurie, David Morse, Robin Wright Penn, and Isabelle Fuhrman in her film debut. Filmed near Wilmington, North Carolina and set in 1956 Alabama, the film follows a troubled girl who finds solace from an abusive life through the music of Elvis Presley.

Hounddog premiered at the Sundance Film Festival on January 22, 2007, where it was nominated for the Grand Jury Prize, and was given a limited theatrical release on September 19, 2008. Although Fanning was praised for her performance, the film was panned by critics due to a controversial rape scene that was filmed when Fanning was only twelve years old. It was also a commercial failure, grossing $131,961, against an estimated $4 million production budget.

== Plot ==
In 1956, 12-year-old Alabama native Lewellen lives in poverty with her stern, religious grandmother, who has taken it upon herself to raise the girl, as Lewellen's father, Lou, cannot provide her stability. Lou struggles with alcoholism, though he tries his best to make Lewellen happy, such as gifting her an Elvis Presley vinyl record. He even tries to provide a motherly figure for Lewellen by dating a mysterious woman, Ellen, who promised one night to rescue Lewellen from life in the rural South should her relationship with her father fall apart. Ellen is later revealed to be Lewellen's maternal aunt and Grannie's estranged daughter.

Lewellen finds consolation in playing with her best friend Buddy, idling away her last preteen summer with typical outdoor rural pastimes such as swimming in the pond and exploring the woods. Lewellen and Buddy make a new friend, Grasshopper, who is spending the summer with her grandparents. Lewellen begins to idolize Elvis, even more so after she learns he is coming to Alabama for a concert. Lewellen finds that singing Elvis' music is a way to channel her trauma into something constructive and creative. Charles acts as a mentor, imparting wisdom of his snake handler religion to explain this to Lewellen, in other words, how to create something positive out of something venomous and deadly.

Ellen leaves after Lou assaults her, pretending she doesn't know who Lewellen is after her car is towed. Lou is struck by lightning while mowing the lawn, leaving him mentally handicapped, but the thought of Elvis coming to town gives Lewellen the resolve to carry on despite her circumstances. Buddy tells Lewellen that the local milkman, Wooden's Boy, has an Elvis ticket and is willing to give it to her if she does her Elvis dance for him. Just as Lewellen starts singing and dancing, Wooden's Boy tells her to take off her clothes. Lewellen questions doing such an act, but agrees to do so after Buddy tells her it is part of the deal. Once Lewellen finishes, Wooden's Boy unzips his trousers and rapes her while a horrified Buddy looks away.

The assault causes severe emotional trauma for Lewellen that manifests as an illness. During church service, Buddy and Grasshopper laugh at Lewellen, causing her to walk out. Subsequently, Buddy breaks his promise to Lewellen by taking Grasshopper to see Elvis instead. Charles and Grannie are distressed by Lewellen's sudden decline in health, and in fits of feverish illness, she hallucinates being attacked by venomous snakes. Ellen returns to town to take Lewellen with her, but Grannie threatens to kill her if she comes back. Later that day, Charles discovers Ellen has been bitten by a rattlesnake and nurses her back to health.

Charles overhears Wooden's Boy bragging to Buddy about what he did to Lewellen. Enraged, Charles resolves to help Lewellen reclaim her voice by encouraging her to sing "Hound Dog". An emotional Lewellen struggles to sing, but she manages to pull through and reduces Charles and his bandmates to tears. The next morning, Lewellen finds a puppy abandoned on the road, and shortly after, Ellen drives up in her car. Lewellen shows her the puppy and Ellen expresses that she wants Lewellen to go with her now to start a new life together, as she’d promised. While Ellen waits in her car on the side of the road, Lewellen goes to find her grandmother and father one final time, and spots them outside attempting to kill a large, venomous snake. She watches them for a moment from a distance, then calls to her father. He looks to Lewellen and she tells him that she loves him. Lou smiles and replies with, “Yes ma’am” before looking back to the snake. Lewellen says nothing more, then turns and walks away for the last time, leaving her home and old life behind.

== Cast ==
- Dakota Fanning as Lewellen
- Isabelle Fuhrman as Gwendalyn "Grasshopper"
- Piper Laurie as Grannie
- Jill Scott as Big Mama Thornton
- David Morse as Lou
- Robin Wright Penn as Ellen
- Christoph Sanders as Wooden's Boy
- Cody Hanford as Buddy
- Afemo Omilami as Charles
- Ryan Pelton as Elvis Presley
- Sean A. Wallace as Boy

== Reception ==
The film garnered a great deal of attention, and generated intense controversy, owing to the use of a very young actress in a role that included a rape scene far before reaching a consent age. Though the scene only showed Fanning's face and her character's reaction to the trauma of the act, it became known as the "Dakota Fanning rape movie" at the Sundance Film Festival. Fanning expressed ire towards the attacks against her family, most of which she said were directed toward her mother.

Because of the outcry over Hounddog, North Carolina State Senator and minority leader Phil Berger called for all future films made in North Carolina to have their scripts approved in advance if they are to get the normal production subsidy from the state. Berger says that he has not seen the film but is acting in response to what he has read about it.

Review aggregation website Rotten Tomatoes gives the film a score of 15% based on reviews from 54 critics, with the website's consensus stating: "Despite a noble effort from Dakota Fanning, Hounddog is overwrought, cliche-ridden and downright exploitative." Metacritic, which uses a weighted average, assigned the film a score of 31 out of 100, based on 18 critics, indicating "generally unfavorable" reviews.

Fanning was praised for her performance by Roger Ebert, who compared it to Jodie Foster's in Taxi Driver.

=== Box office ===
In its opening weekend of September 19–21, 2008, the film took in $13,744 in 11 theaters. It grossed $131,961 in its entire run.
