= Socorro Santiago =

American actress (born 1957)

- Born: July 12, 1957 (age 68); New York City, New York
- Occupation: Actress
- Years active: 1977–present

Socorro Santiago (born July 12, 1957) is an American actress of stage, film, and television. She is known for appearances in Law & Order and a recurring role on All My Children as Isabella Santos from 1993 to 2004.

Santiago was born in New York City to a Puerto Rican mother and Mexican father and attended Juilliard. Initially she began her career as a dancer in dance troupe before moving into acting. She made her acting debut in the 1977 Off-Broadway play Crack and her Broadway debut in the 1980 play The Bacchae.

== Awards ==
Socorro Santiago awards and nominations
Year	Award	Category	Result	Ref.
1998	ALMA Award	Outstanding Actress in a Daytime Soap Opera for All My Children	Nominated	
1999	ALMA Award	Outstanding Actress in a Daytime Soap Opera for All My Children	Won	
2008	IRNE Awards	Best Actress (Drama) for Boleros for the Disenchanted	Nominated	

== Filmography ==
=== Film ===
- Raw Deal (1986) - Nurse at Center
- A Shock to the System (1990) - Rental Car Attendant, Additional Dialogue
- Heaven's Prisoners (1996) - Spanish Nun
- Night Falls on Manhattan (1996) - Lab Assistant
- The Associate (1996) - Syntonex Worker
- Hurricane Streets (1997) - Gloria
- The Devil's Advocate (1997) - Nurse #1
- Happiness (1998) - Crying Teacher
- Lulu on the Bridge (1998) - Paramedic #1
- Music of the Heart (1999) - Lucy's Mother
- Virgin (2003) - Lorna
- Breaking Point (2009) - Nurse Rawlings
- All Good Things (2010) - Nurse
- Butterflies of Bill Baker (2013) - Nerse Bertha
- Gabriel (2014) - Rosa
- Widows (2018) - Lita
- Vampires vs. the Bronx (2020) - Tía Maria
- An Ornament of Faith (2020) - Mother

=== Television ===
Socorro Santiago television credits
Year	Title	Role	Notes
1988	The Equalizer	Mrs. Sanchez	Episode: "Sea of Fire"
1989	The Equalizer	Mother	Episode: "17 Zebra"
1991	Law & Order	Cora Amado	Episode: "God Bless the Child"
1993–2004	All My Children	Isabella Santos	25 episodes
1994	The Cosby Mysteries	Doris Montero	1 episode
1995	New York News	Mary Ann	1 episode
1995	Law & Order	Clarice Reynolds	Episode: "Cruel and Unusual"
1997	Law & Order	Teresa Regalado	Episode: "Working Mom"
1998	Law & Order	Alma Cabrera	Episode: "Punk"
1999	Third Watch	Mrs. Caffey	Episode: "History of the World"
2000	Third Watch	Mrs. Caffey	Episode: "Alone in a Crowd"
2000	Third Watch	Mrs. Caffey	Episode: "This Band of Brothers"
2001	Law & Order	Teresa Martinez	Episode: "White Lie"
2003	Law & Order	Anna Rodriguez	Episode: "Sheltered"
2005	Law & Order	Estela Richter	Episode: "Life Line"
2005	Law & Order: Criminal Intent	Mrs. Raphael	Episode: "Ex Statis"
2010	The Good Wife	Warden's Secretary	1 episode
2011	Law & Order: Special Victims Unit	Domenica Ramos	Episode: "Personal Fouls"
2013	Law & Order: Special Victims Unit	Judge P. Ortiz	Episode: "Funny Valentine"
2013	Law & Order: Special Victims Unit	Judge P. Ortiz	Episode: "Traumatic Wounds"
2014	Law & Order: Special Victims Unit	Judge P. Ortiz	Episode: "Downloaded Child"
2015	Blue Bloods	Manuela Torres	Episode: "The Poor Door"
2016	Madam Secretary	Woman	1 episode
2019	Prodigal Son	Lydia	Episode: "Stranger Beside You"
2022	What We Do in the Shadows	Valeria	Episode: "Pine Barrens"
2023	What We Do in the Shadows	Valeria	Episode: "Local News"

=== Voice acting ===
- Frontline (1999)
- Smuggler's Run (2000) - Conchita Gonzalez
- Dora the Explorer (2004–2006) - Mami, Tía
- True Crime: New York City (2005) - Teresa
