= Tape (2020 film) =

- Directed by: Deborah Kampmeier
- Written by: Deborah Kampmeier
- Produced by: Annarosa Mudd; Veronica Nickel; Deborah Kampmeier
- Starring: Isabelle Fuhrman; Tarek Bishara; Annarosa Mudd
- Cinematography: Valentina Caniglia
- Edited by: Deborah Kampmeier
- Music by: Leslie Graves
- Production company: Full Moon Films
- Distributed by: Full Moon Films
- Release date: March 26, 2020
- Running time: 98 minutes 102 minutes
- Country: United States
- Language: English

Tape is a 2020 American thriller drama film written and directed by Deborah Kampmeier and starring Isabelle Fuhrman, Tarek Bishara and Annarosa Mudd.

== Plot ==
A male director interviews a vulnerable young actress and seems to offer her help to get ahead in the industry, but his motivation is far from altruistic.

== Cast ==
- Isabelle Fuhrman as Pearl
- Annarosa Mudd as Rosa Terrano
- Tarek Bishara as Lux St. Seguin
- Allison Wynn as Lizabeth
- Isabella Pisacane as Jessica Ardizzone
- Alexanna Brier as Chrissy
- Lolly Jensen as Lauren
- Sophia Adleras Faye Moro
- Kana Hatakayama as Daisy

== Production ==
In March 2018, it was announced that Fuhrman was cast as the lead in the film.

== Release ==
The film was given a virtual theatrical release on March 26, 2020 and debuted via streaming on Amazon Prime on April 10, 2020.

== Reception ==
The film has a 63% rating on Rotten Tomatoes based on 24 reviews. Matt Fagerholm of RogerEbert.com awarded the film three and a half stars. Joe Friar of The Victoria Advocate awarded the film three stars. Alex Saveliev of Film Threat rated the film a 3 out of 10. Kate Erbland of IndieWire graded the film a C.

Owen Gleiberman of Variety gave the film a positive review and wrote, "Yet even as the film feels up-to-the-minute, it’s been made with a certain threadbare, streets-of-New-York punk feminist mythologizing that may remind you, at times, of the films of Beth B."

Frank Scheck of The Hollywood Reporter also gave the film a positive review and wrote, "A hard-hitting psychological drama about an actress who surreptitiously monitors her former assailant and his current prospective victim, Tape benefits from its well-executed thriller mechanics and terrific performances by its three leads."

Jeannette Catsoulis of The New York Times gave the film a negative review and wrote, "Tape, in short, is a terrible movie about appalling behavior."

Kimber Meyers of the Los Angeles Times also gave the film a negative review and wrote, "But while Tape is admirable in its aims to frankly explore what happens behind closed doors, it’s less laudable in its execution."
