= Virgin (2003 film) =

- Theatrical release poster
- Directed by: Deborah Kampmeier
- Written by: Deborah Kampmeier
- Produced by: Sarah Schenck; Robin Wright
- Starring: Elisabeth Moss; Robin Wright; Daphne Rubin-Vega
- Cinematography: Benjamin Wolf
- Edited by: Jane Pia Abramowitz
- Distributed by: Full Moon Films
- Release dates: June 14, 2003 (LAFF); September 3, 2004 (United States)
- Running time: 114 minutes
- Country: United States
- Language: English
- Budget: <$75,000
- Box office: $9,614

Virgin is a 2003 American drama film written and directed by Deborah Kampmeier in her feature directorial debut. Starring Elisabeth Moss, Robin Wright, and Daphne Rubin-Vega, the film follows a Baptist teenager who, after discovering she is pregnant with no memory of having had sex, comes to believe that she is carrying the child of God.

Virgin premiered at the Los Angeles Film Festival on June 14, 2003, and was theatrically released in the United States on September 3, 2004. Despite mixed reviews from critics, Moss was singled out for praise for her performance. At the 19th Independent Spirit Awards, Moss was nominated for Best Female Lead, and Kampmeier and Sarah Schenck were nominated for the John Cassavetes Award.

== Plot ==
17-year-old Jessie lives in an unnamed blue-collar town with her parents and younger sister, Katie. Though she was raised Baptist by her religious family, she is rebellious and has fallen into habits of drinking and shoplifting. One night at a church dance, Jessie goes off to the woods with her crush, Shane. Unaware that Shane has put a date rape drug into her drink, Jessie gets drunk and passes out. Shane sexually assaults her while she’s unconscious. Some time after Jessie regains consciousness, she finds herself pregnant. With no memory of having had sex, she believes that she is carrying a child of God. She is shunned by her family—and eventually the whole community—when word of her claim spreads.

== Cast ==
- Elisabeth Moss as Jessie Reynolds
- Robin Wright as Mrs. Reynolds
- Daphne Rubin-Vega as Frances
- Socorro Santiago as Lorna
- Peter Gerety as Mr. Reynolds
- Stephanie Gatschet as Katie Reynolds
- Charles Socarides as Shane
- Sam Riley as Michael
- Casey Wilson as girlfriend (uncredited)
- Curtiss Cook as Security Guard (uncredited)

== Production ==
The film was shot in 21 days on digital video. Robin Wright’s support was an integral part of the film getting financed and produced.

== Reception ==
Roger Ebert gave the film 3 out of 4 stars. In a positive review, TV Guide said that while the film’s symbolism can be heavy-handed, "Moss' extraordinary performance as the restless, troubled Jesse makes up for a multitude of minor flaws; it's so transparent it scarcely seems like acting at all, and gives the film a haunting power that's hard to shake off." PopMatters wrote, "Virgin's potential subversion lies in its demonstration of the ways U.S. ideals and expectations are literally inscribed on the body of young women. Yet the film is ultimately hopeful."

In a negative review, Wesley Morris of The Boston Globe wrote, "So much of Virgin is bunk masquerading as sexual politics. It could have been a truly provocative work of religious devotion but settles for weakly held feminist positions that make Christianity look like the scariest religion ever." He also argued the film doesn’t quite know what it wants to be, commenting the premise "sounds like the start of a John Waters movie, only [the film] is not a comedy. It also evokes something by Carl Dreyer, but [the film] is not that pious." Scott Tobias of The A.V. Club opined, "A truly courageous movie might have taken Moss' character at her word and followed through on the premise of a 21st-century Virgin Mary."

On review aggregate website Rotten Tomatoes, Virgin has an approval rating of 38% based on 21 reviews.

== Awards and nominations ==
=== Won ===
- Hamptons International Film Festival 2003: Best Screenplay: Deborah Kampmeier
- Nashville Film Festival 2003: 2nd place Dreammaker Award: Deborah Kampmeier
- Santa Fe Film Festival 2003: Milagro Award : Best Independent Spirit: Deborah Kampmeier
- Sedona International Film Festival 2004: Director's Choice Award: Best Actress: Elisabeth Moss
- Toronto Female Eye Film Festival 2003: Jury Award: Best Feature Film: Deborah Kampmeier

=== Nominated ===
- Golden Starfish Award: Best Fiction Feature Film/Video: Deborah Kampmeier
- Independent Spirit Awards 2004
  - Best Female Lead: Elisabeth Moss
  - John Cassavetes Award: Deborah Kampmeier (writer/director) and Sarah Schenck (producer)
