= Last Breath (2025 film) =

2025 film by Alex Parkinson

- US theatrical release poster
- Directed by: Alex Parkinson
- Written by: Mitchell LaFortune; Alex Parkinson; David Brooks
- Based on: Last Breath by: Alex Parkinson; Richard da Costa
- Produced by: David Brooks; Paul Brooks; Hal Sadoff; Norman Golightly; Jeremy Plager; Stewart le Maréchal; Al Morrow; Anna Mohr-Pietsch
- Starring: Woody Harrelson; Simu Liu; Finn Cole; Cliff Curtis
- Cinematography: Nick Remy Matthews; Ian Seabrook (Note: Underwater Director of Photography.)
- Edited by: Tania Goding
- Music by: Paul Leonard-Morgan
- Production companies: Longshot Films; Dark Castle Entertainment; Gold Circle Films; MetFilm
- Distributed by: Focus Features (Select territories); Entertainment Film Distributors (United Kingdom); FilmNation Entertainment (International)
- Release dates: 27 February 2025 (Greece and the Netherlands); 28 February 2025 (US); 14 March 2025 (UK)
- Running time: 93 minutes
- Countries: United Kingdom; United States
- Language: English
- Budget: $23.8 million
- Box office: $24.8 million

Last Breath is a 2025 biographical survival thriller film directed by Alex Parkinson and written by Parkinson, Mitchell LaFortune, and David Brooks. It stars Woody Harrelson, Simu Liu, Finn Cole, and Cliff Curtis. It is a feature film remake of the 2019 documentary that Parkinson co-directed with Richard da Costa, and follows a group of deep-sea divers who race to rescue a stranded teammate after an accident.

The film was theatrically released in the United States on 28 February 2025, by Focus Features and Entertainment Film Distributors, respectively. It received generally positive reviews from critics.

== Plot ==
Chris Lemons, Duncan Allcock, and David Yuasa are members of a team of saturation divers who work to maintain undersea gas lines in the North Sea. While on rotation, the divers live onboard a vessel in pressurized chambers which maintain conditions required for diving and working at 300 feet (90 m) below sea level. The divers are transported to and from these chambers by a pressurized diving bell, which is lowered to depth from the ship and allows the divers to remain at pressure for the entirety of their four-week work rotation.

During a deployment, Lemons and Yuasa exit the bell to begin work on an undersea gas line manifold, while Allcock remains stationed in the bell to monitor their status and attend to the umbilical lines that supply them with communications, hot water and breathing gas.

Lemons and Yuasa navigate to the manifold and prepare to begin their work, but on the surface in heavy seas, their vessel's dynamic positioning system (DPS) experiences a malfunction, causing the ship to begin drifting away from the work site. The bell is dragged along with Allcock still inside, and Lemons and Yuasa scramble to climb to the top of the manifold so that they will be unobstructed when they are also pulled along.

Yuasa successfully ascends the manifold, but Lemons' umbilical line becomes entangled in the structure. Yuasa, realizing that Lemons' umbilical will snap within moments, tells Lemons to switch to his backup air supply, which will provide him with ten minutes of emergency oxygen. He promises to come back for Lemons, but tells him he must be on top of the manifold for Yuasa to be able to locate him. Moments later, the umbilical snaps, leaving Lemons behind with only his emergency air supply and no means of communicating. Yuasa is carried away on the diving platform still attached to the bell and the ship.

Meanwhile, on the ship's bridge, the crew look for solutions to the DPS's malfunction. They are unable to drop anchor due to their proximity to various gas lines: severing one would create an environmental catastrophe. With no other options, the captain and the first mate decide to manually operate the ship's thrusters, preventing them from drifting even further away from the work site while a third crew member works to bypass the reboot process for the DPS.

Yuasa makes it back to the bell and regroups with Allcock. On the bridge, another crewmember using a remotely operated underwater vehicle (ROV) is able to locate Lemons. He is able to observe that Lemons is still alive, but has fallen unconscious and is showing symptoms of oxygen deprivation. He attempts to rescue Lemons with the ROV, but is unable to lift him as Lemons had fastened himself to the manifold to avoid being swept away by the undersea currents.

The crew are able to reboot the DPS and reposition over the work site. Yuasa is able to redeploy from the bell and rescue Lemons, whose oxygen ran out 29 minutes prior. Allcock brings Lemons aboard the bell and performs mouth-to-mouth resuscitation, after which Lemons begins breathing again. Yuasa reenters the bell, and he and Allcock both attempt to communicate with an unresponsive Lemons, who appears to have suffered severe brain damage as a result of prolonged oxygen deprivation. Just as the two divers begin to accept that they were too late, Lemons begins to speak and respond normally.

The rotation is aborted and Lemons recuperates in the saturation chamber during the voyage home. Back at port, he parts ways with Allcock and Yuasa before journeying home and reuniting with his fiancée, revealing to her what happened.

In an epilogue, the audience is told that Lemons suffered no lasting mental or physical impairment as a result of the incident, with experts unable to explain the reasons for his survival. Lemons, Yuasa, and Allcock returned to work three weeks later to finish the job they started.

== Cast ==
- Woody Harrelson as Duncan Allcock
- Simu Liu as David Yuasa
- Finn Cole as Chris Lemons
- Cliff Curtis as Captain Andre Jenson
- Mark Bonnar as Craig
- MyAnna Buring as Hanna
- Bobby Rainsbury as Morag, Chris' fiance
- Josef Altin as Mike

== Production ==
In May 2022, it was announced that Alex Parkinson was directing a narrative film remake of his 2019 documentary, with Woody Harrelson, Simu Liu and Djimon Hounsou cast to star.

Principal photography began in Malta on May 29, 2023 with filming running through July 17, 2023 with Finn Cole joining the cast.

In May 2024, Focus Features acquired distribution rights to the film in territories including the U.S., France, Scandinavia, Australia, New Zealand, China, Indonesia, Malaysia, South Korea and Vietnam for $5 million, while FilmNation Entertainment co-financed the film and handled international sales.

== Release ==
Last Breath was first released in Greece and the Netherlands on 27 February 2025, and was released in the United States on 28 February 2025. Social media analytics firm RelishMix reported that online marketing led to 37.2 million interactions across social media platforms, 60% behind the average for drama-thrillers. According to iSpot, Focus spent $5.1 million on linear TV advertising (comparatively, they spent $6.1 million on Conclave and twice as much on Nosferatu in 2024).

=== Box office ===
In the United States and Canada, Last Breath was projected to gross $5–9 million from 3,011 theaters in its opening weekend. The film made $3 million on its first day, including an estimated $1 million from Thursday night previews. It went on to debut to $7.85 million, finishing second at the box office behind holdover Captain America: Brave New World. It made $4.1 million in its second weekend, a 47.8% drop to finish in third. After decreasing its theater count to 2,661 screens, the film made $2.3 million in its third weekend, dropping to tenth place. It then went down to 1,519 theaters, grossing under a million dollars in its fourth weekend and dropping out of the box office top ten.

=== Critical response ===
On the review aggregator website Rotten Tomatoes, 79% of 134 critics' reviews are positive, with an average rating of 6.7/10. The website's consensus reads: "Ratcheting up the tension to a riveting degree, Last Breath tells a remarkable true story with the utmost efficiency and a dependably terrific performance from Woody Harrelson." Metacritic, which uses a weighted average, assigned the film a score of 65 out of 100, based on 33 critics, indicating "generally favorable" reviews. Audiences polled by CinemaScore gave the film an average grade of "B+" on an A+ to F scale, while PostTrak reported an average of 4.5 out of 5 stars from filmgoers, with 61% saying they would definitely recommend the film.

Richard Roeper of the Chicago Sun-Times gave the film three out of four stars and wrote that the film "maintains a sense of suspense throughout, and delivers a powerful emotional impact in its final scenes."
