= Tipi Tales =

Canadian TV series

- Genre: Children's television
- Country of origin: Canada
- Original language: English
- No. of seasons: 3
- No. of episodes: 78

Production
- Production locations: Winnipeg, Manitoba, Canada
- Running time: 10–14 minutes
- Production company: Eagle Vision

Original release
- Network: APTN; Treehouse TV
- Release: February 5, 2003 – 2007

Tipi Tales is a Canadian children's puppet television series about a First Nations family living in a woodlands cottage, and focused on teaching children about the importance of family and friends, as well as First Nations culture.

The show premiered on 5 February 2003, and ended in 2007. The series had three seasons, each consisting of twenty-six 10- to 14-minute episodes (a total of 78 episodes). The characters were represented by puppets.

The show was co-produced by APTN and Treehouse TV, and filmed by Eagle Vision in their dedicated studio in Winnipeg, Manitoba. Both networks aired the show simultaneously; the show was also broadcast in New Zealand and Australia. Reruns were cancelled from Treehouse TV on 6 September 2009, while APTN's reruns continued until 2010.

== Characters ==
The series centers around four Ojibway cousins who learn various wisdoms of life during their visits to their great-grandfather’s home.

=== Russell ===
Russell (voiced by Herbie Barnes) is four years old. He is big for his age but is a very gentle and sensitive boy. People often expect more from him because of his size. He loves to eat and is always hoping that Great-Grandmother has something cooking in the kitchen, especially cookies or pies.

Russell has many fears. He tries hard to keep them to himself, but they usually surface in some type of disaster. He looks up to Junior and Elizabeth and wants to be "grown-up" just like them.

Russell counts on Sam to be his accomplice. Junior is his hero and Russell takes great pride in playing drums for Junior's dancing or even being asked to play with him. He is goofy and loud, and his enthusiasm for life is contagious. But his greatest gift is the joy he brings to others.

=== Sam ===
Samantha "Sam" (voiced by Jan Skene) is a three-year-old who is a mischievous, funny, free spirit living in the moment. She thinks everything is "the bestest!" She's cute and snuggly with a curly bob of black hair flopping carelessly on top of her head. Sam can get away with just about anything. Her cousins find her a little annoying but would do anything for her.

Sam always pushes the limits and rarely listens to anyone. She thinks she doesn't need anyone's advice, but that usually gets her into her biggest scrapes.

In a way that only a three-year-old can, Sam always tells it like it is. She's smart, quick, and has sudden bolts of great big ideas. As a result, she can persuade her cousins to do wild and crazy things. She lives with joy and abandon.

=== Elizabeth ===
Elizabeth (voiced by Rebecca Gibson) is a precocious and confident five-year-old. She is artistic, expressive, and has an opinion on everything. She sees herself as the leader of the group. She can sometimes be self-absorbed and often ends up being excluded.

The "princess" of the group, Elizabeth wants things to go her way and is determined to see that happen. She has many fears but usually manages to hide them well. She fights for what she believes in (even when she is wrong) and periodically has meltdowns, but she has a good heart and loves her cousins very much.

While she can be nurturing, she often plays the martyr, complete with whole body sighs. "I have to do everything myself I guess...." Elizabeth knows she is destined for greatness. Even though she drives them crazy, her cousins all look up to her.

=== Junior ===
Junior (voiced by Ryan Rajendra Black) is a five-year-old Ojibway boy who stays at his great-grandparents' house in the every week while his parents work. His real name is Eugene, which he hates, so everyone calls him Junior. Junior is traditional and proud of it. He wears long braids and loves everything about being Native. He is very spiritual. Focused and serious, his feelings often get hurt. He and Elizabeth frequently clash over leadership issues. He can be very self-righteous, even a bulldozer at times, but he has great passion for life and nature.

Great-Grandfather is his hero and like him, Junior is a great dancer and loves telling traditional stories. He is sincere, loving, and hungry for life.

=== Great-Grandparents ===
The great-grandparents act as caregivers to their great-grandchildren. They share information and encourage new ways of thinking, guiding the children to the animal who will help them discover the best course of action.

==== Great-Grandmother ====
Great-Grandmother (voiced by Michelle St. John) is wise and kind, but often enigmatic. Great-Grandmother has a sense of humour and the kids make her laugh all the time.

Great-Grandmother makes saskatoonberry pies which are highly regarded in the show. She makes quilts and gardens that are also praised.

==== Great-Grandfather ====
Great-Grandfather (voiced by Jules Desjarlais) is a fairly traditional man, but is willing to accept the modern world through the children. Great-Grandfather is a dreamer and storyteller but lives the seven principles.

Great-Grandfather listens well and understands. He doesn't judge. He has endless stories that enchant and inform the kids. He loves playing his drum and teaching the children to do a Native dance. His laugh is infectious and he never seems to get riled.

He is tender and humble and has a wonderful sense of humour. He has a respect for the natural world and teaches the kids about the voice in the wind, the spirit of the tree and giving a gift of thanks. He knows the stars, moon, and sun personally.

=== Episodes ===
Tree of Love The Winner The Loser Pudgy Bear Thunder The Promise The Tree House Picking Berries The Race Girl Who Cried Windigo Big Whopper Little Girl Lost Too Many Words Friends Last Laugh The Song Sleepy Time Pow Wow All About Me Stand Up Chocolate Snatcher Tummy Ache Runner Boy Fly A Kite Missing Pie Mystery Rabbit Hop

=== Animals ===
When the children have a problem, the great-grandparents instruct them to speak with an animal guide to help solve the problem. They would usually sing songs with the children. Each animal represents one of the Seven Sacred Laws, or teachings:

- Wolf is Humility
- Sabe (Bigfoot) is Honesty
- Bear is Courage
- Eagle is Love
- Buffalo is Respect
- Turtle is Truth
- Beaver is Wisdom

=== Songs ===
Wolf:Humility

Original Music By:Fred Penner

Not Too Big

Not Too Small

Just The Right Size Is Best Of All

Don’t Try To Be Someone That You’re Not

Be Proud Of All You’ve Got

Every Morning You Look In The Mirror

Who Is The Person You See

Is It Someone Who’s Bossy You’re Shy

Or Someone With Humanity

Not Too Big

Not Too Small

Just The Right Size Is Best Of All

Don’t Try To Be Someone That You’re Not

Be Proud Of All You’ve Got

Growing Up Isn’t Easy It’s True

That We Take You By The Hand

There Are Things You Shouldn’t Do

And In Time You’ll Understand

When Someone Hurts Your Feelings

And You Feel You Wanna Cry

Don’t Go And Do The Same Thing To Some Other Girl Or Guy

Not Too Big

Not Too Small

Just The Right Size Is Best Of All

Don’t Try To Be Someone That You’re Not

Be Proud Of All You’ve Got

Not Too Big

Not Too Small

Just The Right Size Is Best Of All

Don’t Try To Be Someone That You’re Not

Be Proud Of All You’ve Got
