= Ian Seabrook =

Canadian-British film and television cinematographer

- Born: Canada
- Occupation: Cinematographer
- Years active: 1998–present
- Website: www.dorsalfin.net == Other website == : Ian Seabrook

Ian Seabrook is a cinematographer, specializing in underwater cinematography. He is known for his underwater and second unit cinematography. Seabrook is also a professional diver.

== Career ==
Seabrook began his career as a stills photographer, photographing underwater in Australia on the Great Barrier Reef. He transitioned to working as an underwater cinematographer in 1998. In 2018, Seabrook photographed underwater sequences for Disney's Jungle Cruise. In 2020 Seabrook photographed National Geographic Documentary Films’ The Rescue with filmmakers Elizabeth Chai Vasarhelyi and Jimmy Chin. This is a documentary about the 2018 Tham Luang cave rescue, Seabrook recreated the cave-diving team's work in extracting the stranded Thai soccer team.

Seabrook also photographed underwater cinematography for the films Last Breath, Indiana Jones and the Dial of Destiny, Old, Man of Steel and Batman v Superman.
