= Dear Eleanor =

- Theatrical release poster
- Directed by: Kevin Connolly
- Written by: Cecilia Contreras; Amy Garcia
- Produced by: Caleb Applegate; Chuck Pacheco; Hillary Sherman
- Starring: Isabelle Fuhrman; Liana Liberato; Jessica Alba; Josh Lucas; Luke Wilson; Joel Courtney; Ione Skye; Patrick Schwarzenegger
- Cinematography: Steven Fierberg
- Edited by: Jim Flynn
- Music by: Aaron Zigman
- Production company: Nine Nights
- Distributed by: Destination Films
- Release date: July 5, 2016
- Running time: 86 minutes
- Country: United States
- Language: English

Dear Eleanor is a 2016 American film, directed by Kevin Connolly, and starring Isabelle Fuhrman, Josh Lucas, Liana Liberato, and Jessica Alba. Written by Cecilia Contreras and Amy Garcia, it is a coming of age story about two best friends traveling across the U.S. in 1962 to meet their childhood hero, Eleanor Roosevelt.

== Plot ==
In 1962, in the shadow of the Cuban Missile Crisis, two teenage girls (Isabelle Fuhrman and Liana Liberato) break out of their normal life, jump in the car and embark on a trip across the country in search of the former First Lady of the United States, Eleanor Roosevelt. Their Thelma & Louise cross-country adventure is a mix of hilarious joy ride and an empowering personal odyssey that not only tests their friendship for the first time but also lands the girls in jail.

== Cast ==
- Isabelle Fuhrman as Maxine ”Max the Wax” Wax
- Liana Liberato as Eleanor ”Ellie” Potter
- Jessica Alba as Aunt Daisy, Max's aunt
- Josh Lucas as Frank Morris
- Ione Skye as Charlotte
- Luke Wilson as Bob Potter
- Patrick Schwarzenegger as Bud
- Joel Courtney as Billy
- Paul Johansson as Hugh
- Claire van der Boom as Caroline Potter

== Production ==
Chuck Pacheco, Hillary Sherman and Caleb Applegate produced the film, which began shooting in Boulder County, Colorado on May 14, 2013. The town of Niwot doubled for 1960s town of Manteca, California. Towns in Colorado's Front Range section of the Rocky Mountains, including Longmont, Lyons, Nederland, Boulder and Hygiene, were also used as locations. Filming took place in Downtown Denver at the Paramount Theatre before shooting wrapped in mid-June. Re-shoots occurred approximately a year later. A Colorado state economic incentive program helped to attract the production, which would spend $2.5 million in the state.

== Release ==
The film was released on video on demand and DVD on July 5, 2016.
