= Elina Fuhrman =

Moldovan–American journalist, author, activist, chef, and businessperson

- Born: Elina Kozmits; February 18, 1969 (age 57); Moldavian SSR, USSR
- Occupations: Journalist, author, activist, chef, businessperson
- Years active: 1999–present
- Spouse: Nick Fuhrman (m. 1991; died 2024)
- Children: 2, including Isabelle Fuhrman

Elina Kozmits Fuhrman (born February 18, 1969) is a Moldovan–American journalist, author, thought leader, and businessperson. She is the founder and CEO of Soupelina, helping women overcome cancer naturally.

== Early life ==
Elina Fuhrman was born Elina Kozmits in the Moldavian SSR of the Soviet Union. She emigrated to the United States from Moscow in 1989 and later became a naturalized U.S. citizen. Her mother, Rita Kozmits, also immigrated to the United States. In May 1991, Elina married Nick Fuhrman, a congressional candidate from Madison, Wisconsin. The couple has two daughters: actress Isabelle Fuhrman and singer Madeline Fuhrman. In 1999, the family moved to Atlanta when Elina joined CNN. They later relocated to Los Angeles. Her husband died in 2024, aged 60.

Elina Fuhrman earned a degree in journalism from the University of Wisconsin, Madison, and studied English and linguistics at Moscow State Pedagogical University.

== Career ==
Elina Fuhrman was a writer, producer, and correspondent for CNN International. She has received awards for her coverage of the war in Afghanistan and the September 11th terrorist attacks in New York City, Washington, D.C., and near Shanksville, Pennsylvania. She has covered major world events such the Middle East, the trial of former Yugoslav leader Slobodan Milošević, and the wars in Iraq and Chechnya. Her work has appeared on CNN, NPR, and in publications such as The New York Times, The Atlanta Journal-Constitution, InStyle, Conde Nast Traveler, SELF, and Jezebel.

=== Soupelina ===
In 2013, Fuhrman founded Soupelina, a vegan soup company. On February 2, 2016, she published her first book, Soupelina's Soup Cleanse, which was featured in The New York Times during the week of its release; Soupelina's Soup Cleanse was also featured in the monthly women's fashion magazine Harper's Bazaar.

== Publications ==
Fuhrman's publications include;

- Soupelina's Soup Cleanse: Plant-Based Soups and Broths to Heal Your Body, Calm Your Mind, and Transform Your Life (2016)
- Soup up your life!: 50 vegane Rezepte für ein neues Körpergefühl (with Brigitte Rüßmann and Wolfgang Beuchelt, translators) (2016)
- 'Depura Sopa: Sopas, cremas y caldos vegetales que depuran, sanan y revitalizan, (with Tatiana Vargas Löwy, translator) (2017)
