= Last Breath (2019 film) =

2019 British documentary film

- Directed by: Richard da Costa; Alex Parkinson
- Written by: Alex Parkinson
- Produced by: Al Morrow; Richard da Costa; Stewart Le Maréchal; Angus Lamont; Dylan Williams; Alex Parkinson
- Starring: Chris Lemons; David Yuasa; Duncan Allcock; Craig Frederick; Michal Cichorski
- Cinematography: Alistair McCormick
- Edited by: Sam Rogers
- Music by: Paul Leonard-Morgan
- Production companies: MetFilm; Floating Harbour; Crab Apple Films; Backflip Media
- Distributed by: Dogwoof
- Release date: 5 April 2019
- Running time: 90 minutes
- Country: United Kingdom
- Language: English

Last Breath is a 2019 British documentary film directed by Richard da Costa and Alex Parkinson. It relates the story of a serious saturation diving accident in 2012, when diver Chris Lemons had his excursion umbilical cable severed and was trapped around 100 metres (330 ft) under the sea without heat or light, and with only the small amount of breathing gas in his bailout cylinder.

In 2025, Parkinson directed a feature film version of the event.

== Plot ==
The documentary uses genuine footage and audio recorded at the time of the accident on the divers' voice communications equipment and helmet cameras, supplemented with interviews of several of the individuals involved, as well as some reconstructed footage, to tell the story of the accident.

Chris Lemons, along with his colleagues Duncan Allcock and David Yuasa, were carrying out repairs 100 metres (330 ft) below the surface of the North Sea, supported by the support vessel Bibby Topaz. The vessel's dynamic positioning system, supplied by Kongsberg Maritime, failed. This caused the vessel to drift in rough seas, dragging the divers away from the area they were working and eventually snapping the umbilical tether that provided Lemons with heliox breathing gas, as well as hot water to heat his suit, power for his light, and a communications link to the bell and surface. He was left with only five minutes supply of breathable gas contained in the emergency gas supply cylinders he carried on his back.

For reasons that are unclear to Lemons and his colleagues, but attributed in part to the cold water and having been breathing a gas mix with a high partial pressure of oxygen, Lemons survived for around 30 minutes while he was located by a remotely operated underwater vehicle and then by Yuasa, who was able to pull him back onboard the diving bell.

== Release ==
Last Breath was distributed in the UK by Dogwoof and was released simultaneously in cinemas and on Netflix on 5 April 2019.

In France the documentary was distributed by Arte on 11 September 2019 with the title Le survivant des abysses.

== Reception ==
On the review aggregator website Rotten Tomatoes, 87% of 15 critics' reviews are positive, with an average rating of 6.8/10. Metacritic, which uses a weighted average, assigned the film a score of 61 out of 100, based on five critics, indicating "generally favorable" reviews.

Empire gave it three stars, describing it as 'a great story' but comparing it unfavourably to similar survival documentaries such as Touching the Void. The Financial Times awarded four stars, and called it a 'powerful documentary'.
