= David Leslie Johnson-McGoldrick =

American screenwriter

- Born: David Leslie Johnson; Mansfield, Ohio, U.S.
- Education: Ohio State University (BFA)
- Occupations: Screenwriter; television writer; television producer; film producer
- Years active: 1994–present
- Spouses: Kimberly Lofstrom (div. 2012) Stacy McGoldrick (m. 2015)

David Leslie Johnson-McGoldrick (né Johnson) is an American screenwriter and producer of film and television. He has written the screenplays for the films Orphan (2009), Wrath of the Titans (2012), The Conjuring 2 (2016) and its sequels The Conjuring: The Devil Made Me Do It (2021) and The Conjuring: Last Rites (2025), and the DC Extended Universe films Aquaman (2018) and its sequel Aquaman and the Lost Kingdom (2023).

== Early life and education ==
Johnson was born and raised in Mansfield, Ohio. He began writing plays in the second grade. He graduated from Lexington High School in Lexington, Ohio. He attended Ohio State University in Columbus, Ohio, and graduated with a Bachelor of Fine Arts degree in photography and cinema.

== Career ==
Johnson began his career as a production assistant on Frank Darabont's The Shawshank Redemption, which was filmed on location in Johnson's hometown of Mansfield, Ohio, at the historic Ohio State Reformatory, where Johnson's great-grandfather had been a prison guard. Johnson spent the next five years as Darabont's assistant, using the opportunity to hone his craft as a screenwriter. He wrote at least two scripts for the cancelled Return of the Thing, a four-hour sequel mini-series to John Carpenter's 1982 cult classic The Thing. The project was ultimately cancelled for unknown reasons. He later worked with Darabont on his television series The Walking Dead and Mob City.

Johnson has collaborated several times with filmmaker James Wan, contributing entries in The Conjuring franchise, dramatizations of the real-life cases of Ed and Lorraine Warren, as well as the DC Comics film Aquaman and its sequel. He is set to write a film adaptation of the board game Mice and Mystics. He wrote a sequel to The Flash as well.

== Filmography ==
Film

Year	Title	Writer	Executive producer	Director
2009	Orphan	Yes	No	Jaume Collet-Serra
2011	Red Riding Hood	Yes	No	Catherine Hardwicke
2012	Wrath of the Titans	Yes	No	Jonathan Liebesman
2016	The Conjuring 2	Yes	No	James Wan
2018	Aquaman	Yes	No	James Wan
2021	The Conjuring: The Devil Made Me Do It	Yes	No	Michael Chaves
2022	Orphan: First Kill	Story	Yes	William Brent Bell
2023	Aquaman and the Lost Kingdom	Yes	No	James Wan
2025	The Conjuring: Last Rites	Yes	Yes	Michael Chaves
2026	Insidious: Out of the Further	Story	Yes	Jacob Chase

Television

Year	Title	Writer	Consulting producer	Notes
2011–2022	The Walking Dead	Yes	Yes	14 episodes
2013	Mob City	Yes	No	2 episodes

Other credits

Year	Title	Role
1994	The Shawshank Redemption	Production assistant
1999	The Green Mile	Assistant to Frank Darabont
2021	Till Death	Producer
2026	Orphans	Producer
