= Spell (film) =

2020 film by Mark Tonderai

- Release poster
- Directed by: Mark Tonderai
- Written by: Kurt Wimmer
- Produced by: Gordon Gray; Kurt Wimmer; Morris Chestnut; Brian Wilkins
- Starring: Omari Hardwick; Loretta Devine; John Beasley
- Cinematography: Jacques Jouffret
- Edited by: Sarah C. Reeves
- Music by: Ben Onono
- Production companies: Paramount Players; Mayhem Pictures; MC8 Entertainment
- Distributed by: Paramount Pictures
- Release date: October 30, 2020
- Running time: 92 minutes
- Countries: United States; South Africa
- Language: English
- Box office: $500,104

Spell is a 2020 supernatural thriller film directed by Mark Tonderai and starring Omari Hardwick and Loretta Devine. It was released in the United States through digital by Paramount Pictures on October 30, 2020.

== Premise ==
While flying to his father's funeral in rural Appalachia Kentucky, an intense storm causes Marquis to lose control of the plane carrying himself and his family. He soon awakens wounded, alone and trapped in Ms. Eloise's attic. Eloise claims she can nurse him back to health with a hoodoo figure she has made from his blood and skin. Unable to call for help, Marquis desperately tries to break free from her dark magic and save his family from a sinister ritual before the rise of the blood moon.

== Cast ==
- Omari Hardwick as Marquis T. Woods
- Loretta Devine as Ms. Eloise
- John Beasley as Earl
- Lorraine Burroughs as Veora Woods
- Hannah Gonera as Samsara Woods
- Kalifa Burton as Tydon Woods
- Tumisho Masha as Sheriff
- Steve Mululu as Lewis

== Production ==
The film was shot in South Africa around the outskirts of Cape Town and Stellenbosch.

== Release ==
The film was released on digital platforms by Paramount Pictures on October 30, 2020. It was originally scheduled to be released theatrically on August 28, 2020 before it was pulled from the schedule due to the COVID-19 pandemic. It was later rescheduled to be released on home media on October 30, 2020.

== Reception ==
On the review aggregator website Rotten Tomatoes, 49% of 51 critics' reviews are positive, with an average rating of 5.3/10. The website's consensus reads: "Despite a promising beginning, this repetitive and predictable thriller lacks enough of an identity to cast much of a Spell." Metacritic, which uses a weighted average, assigned the film a score of 38 out of 100, based on 6 critics, indicating "generally unfavorable" reviews.

Tomris Laffly of RogerEbert.com awarded the film one and a half stars. Meagan Navarro of Bloody Disgusting awarded the film one and a half skulls out of five.

Peter Debruge of Variety gave the film a positive review and wrote, "this is a decently stylish thriller with occult elements that should satisfy viewers’ genre requirements, though few will demand a second watch (or sequel)." Frank Scheck of The Hollywood Reporter gave the film a negative review and wrote, "Unfortunately, the filmmaker's stylistic efforts aren't enough to compensate for the predictable, cliché-ridden aspects of the screenplay..."
