= Eagle Vision (company) =

Canadian production company

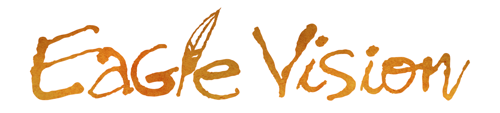
- Industry: Film & television
- Founded: 1999 in Winnipeg, Manitoba
- Founder: Lisa Meeches; Wayne Sheldon
- Headquarters: Winnipeg, Manitoba, Canada
- Owner: Lisa Meeches, Kyle Irving
- Website: eaglevision.ca

Eagle Vision is a Canadian independent film and television production company based in Winnipeg, Manitoba. It is an Aboriginal-owned production company founded in 1999 by Lisa Meeches, President of Meeches Video Productions Inc. and Wayne Sheldon, President of MidCanada Production Services Inc.

Eagle Vision is currently run by Meeches and producer Kyle Irving, son of Bob Irving, a Canadian sportscaster.

In 2006, Eagle Vision was co-producer of the Oscar and Golden Globes award-winning film Capote.

In television, Eagle Vision is primarily known for its Aboriginal TV series.

== Productions ==
=== Film ===
- Orphans (TBA)
- Deaner '89 (2024)
- Buffy Sainte-Marie: Carry It On (2022)
- Orphan: First Kill (2022) – produced in association with
- Night Raiders (2021)
- Lovesick (2016)
- Hard Way Girl (2016)
- Reasonable Doubt (2014)
- Sea Legs
- We Were Children (2012)
- Walk All over Me (2007)
- Blue State (2006)
- Capote (2005)

=== Television ===
- Burden of Truth
- Taken
- Ice Road Truckers
- Jack
- Elijah
- Indigenous Music Awards
- Rising Stars
- Kyle Riabko: The Lead
- Polygamy's Lost Boys
- Celebrate: The Music of Our People
- The Sharing Circle
- The Spirit of Norway House
- Tipi Tales
- We Joggin'
- Where Three Rivers Meet
