= Aryana Engineer =

Canadian actress (born 2001)

- Born: March 6, 2001 (age 25); Port Moody, British Columbia, Canada
- Occupation: Actress
- Years active: 2009–2015

Aryana Engineer (born March 6, 2001) is a Canadian former actress who made her debut in the 2009 horror film Orphan, as a little girl named Max, alongside Vera Farmiga. In 2012 she starred, alongside Milla Jovovich, as Becky in Resident Evil: Retribution, the fifth film in the franchise.

== Life and career ==
Engineer was born partially deaf on March 6, 2001, in British Columbia, Canada.

In 2007, she was discovered when she was spotted using sign language with her mother. The neighbour (Brenda Campbell) who discovered her was an agent, who suggested Aryana for the role of five-year-old Maxine "Max" Coleman in the film Orphan (2009). The neighbour knew the producers were searching for a blond-haired girl who knew how to sign, and decided to take action. In the Orphan script, Max Coleman was described as "unimaginably cute". When director Jaume Collet-Serra saw that Aryana had the ability "while crying, to perform a scene -- to immediately go from there still keeping this emotion", he knew she was the one for the part. According to Collet-Serra, Aryana didn't understand what was going on during the making of Orphan and thought it was all a game.

After the release of Orphan, Aryana took part in a commercial for the 2010 Winter Olympics that was being held in Canada. She also represented Canada with her brother at the 2010 Winter Paralympics opening ceremony, welcoming viewers using sign language.

In September 2012, Resident Evil: Retribution was released to the public. In the film, Aryana plays a deaf girl named Becky who builds a mother-daughter relationship with the main character Alice (Milla Jovovich).

== Filmography ==
| Year | Title | Role | Notes |
|---|---|---|---|
| 2009 | Orphan | Maxine "Max" Coleman | |
| 2012 | Resident Evil: Retribution | Becky | |
| 2015 | Dreaming of Peggy Lee | Belinda | Short movie |

=== Self ===
| Year | Title | Character | Notes |
|---|---|---|---|
| 2010 | Winter Olympics | Herself | With Glowing Hearts Dance |
| 2010 | | Herself | Paralympics Opening Ceremony |
| 2012 | Back From the Afterlife: Making Resident Evil: Retribution | Herself | Behind the Scenes Documentary about Resident Evil: Retribution |
