= Dark Castle Entertainment =

American media production label

- Logo used since 2024
- Type: Label
- Industry: Motion pictures
- Founded: 1998; 28 years ago
- Founder: Joel Silver; Robert Zemeckis; Gilbert Adler
- Headquarters: Beverly Hills, California
- Key people: Hal Sadoff; Norman Golightly; Douglas McClure
- Products: Motion pictures
- Parent: OEG Inc.
- Website: darkcastle.com

Dark Castle Entertainment is a film production label of OEG Inc. It was founded in 1998 originally as a film production company by producers Joel Silver and Gilbert Adler and filmmaker Robert Zemeckis, with most of its productions centered on horror films, the majority of which were distributed by Warner Bros. Pictures.

== History ==
=== 1998–2003: Homage to William Castle, the early years ===
Dark Castle was founded in 1998 by Joel Silver, Robert Zemeckis, and Gilbert Adler. The Dark Castle name pays homage to William Castle, a horror filmmaker from the 1950s and 1960s. When first formed, the goal of the company was to remake Castle's horror films. After two remakes, House on Haunted Hill and Thirteen Ghosts, they moved on to producing original material, along with remakes of non-Castle films.

=== 2003–2013: More horror, action ===
Gothika, starring Halle Berry and Robert Downey Jr., was Dark Castle's first original film in 2003. They followed it up with House of Wax, the company's first remake of a non-Castle film.

In 2008, the company moved beyond the horror genre to produce the action film RocknRolla.

In 2009, Dark Castle released the psychological horror film Orphan. The film grossed $80 million on a $20 million budget. Later that year, the company produced its first martial arts film, Ninja Assassin.

In 2010, they produced action film adaptions of The Losers based on the DC Vertigo comic of the same name, and Unknown starring Liam Neeson, which grossed $136 million against its $30 million budget.

After a long relationship with Warner Bros. Pictures as their main distributor, Dark Castle began working with other distributors including Paramount Pictures and Shudder/AMC.

In 2012, Joel Silver and Universal Studios struck a 5-year, 12-picture, North American marketing and distribution deal, starting with the Liam Neeson action thriller Non-Stop on February 28, 2014. The second film in the distribution deal was originally going to be The Loft, a third-party film to which Dark Castle acquired the U.S distribution rights (as they did for Splice). Universal planned to release The Loft on August 29, 2014, but the studio pulled it from the schedule in favor of Legendary Pictures' As Above, So Below. Universal and Dark Castle sold the distribution rights to Open Road Films, who then released The Loft on January 30, 2015. Afterward, the Universal-Silver partnership was terminated, leaving Non-Stop as the only film to come out of it.

=== 2015–present: New ownership and commercial success ===
Dark Castle, with its then-parent company Silver Pictures, were acquired by Daryl Katz of OEG Inc. in 2015. Hal Sadoff was named CEO.

The company released its first film under OEG the following year, neo noir comedy crime movie The Nice Guys, starring Russell Crowe and Ryan Gosling.

Next, Dark Castle produced the black comedy crime film Suburbicon directed by George Clooney, written by the Coen Brothers, and starring Matt Damon and Julianne Moore.

In 2018, Dark Castle produced Superfly, a remake of the 1972 film Super Fly.

Dark Castle continued to produce horror films, including Seance, starring Suki Waterhouse, and the prequel to Orphan, Orphan: First Kill, starring Isabelle Fuhrman from the original movie. In 2020, the company began producing television with the sci-fi horror series The Expecting.

In 2023, the company filmed Old Guy starring Christoph Waltz, and financed the films Shell, starring Elisabeth Moss and Kate Hudson, and directed by Max Minghella, and Last Breath, which is based on the documentary Last Breath and stars Woody Harrelson and Simu Liu.

== Feature films ==
Release date	Title	Director(s)	Distributor
October 29, 1999	House on Haunted Hill	William Malone	Warner Bros. Pictures
October 26, 2001	Thirteen Ghosts	Steve Beck	Warner Bros. Pictures/Sony Pictures
October 25, 2002	Ghost Ship	Steve Beck	Warner Bros. Pictures
November 21, 2003	Gothika	Mathieu Kassovitz	Warner Bros. Pictures/Sony Pictures
May 6, 2005	House of Wax	Jaume Collet-Serra	Warner Bros. Pictures
April 5, 2007	The Reaping	Stephen Hopkins	Warner Bros. Pictures
October 16, 2007	Return to House on Haunted Hill	Víctor Garcia	Warner Premiere
May 13, 2008	Botched	Kit Ryan	Warner Premiere
October 8, 2008	RocknRolla	Guy Ritchie	Warner Bros. Pictures
February 27, 2009	Echelon Conspiracy	Greg Marcks	After Dark Films
July 24, 2009	Orphan	Jaume Collet-Serra	Warner Bros. Pictures
September 11, 2009	Whiteout	Dominic Sena	Warner Bros. Pictures
September 29, 2009	The Hills Run Red	Dave Parker	Warner Premiere
November 25, 2009	Ninja Assassin	James McTeigue	Warner Bros. Pictures
April 23, 2010	The Losers	Sylvain White	Warner Bros. Pictures
June 4, 2010	Splice	Vincenzo Natali	Gaumont/Warner Bros. Pictures
February 18, 2011	Unknown	Jaume Collet-Serra	Warner Bros. Pictures
August 24, 2012	The Apparition	Todd Lincoln	Warner Bros. Pictures
February 1, 2013	Bullet to the Head	Walter Hill	Warner Bros. Pictures
February 19, 2013	The Factory	Morgan O'Neill	Warner Bros. Pictures
August 30, 2013	Getaway	Courtney Solomon	Warner Bros. Pictures
October 27, 2017	Suburbicon	George Clooney	Paramount Pictures
May 21, 2021	Seance	Simon Barrett	RLJE Films
August 19, 2022	Orphan: First Kill	William Brent Bell	Paramount Pictures
February 21, 2025	Old Guy	Simon West	The Avenue
February 28, 2025	Last Breath	Alex Parkinson	Focus Features/Elevation Pictures
October 3, 2025	Shell	Max Minghella	Republic Pictures
January 30, 2026	Worldbreaker	Brad Anderson	Aura Entertainment
June 5, 2026	The Passenger	Vadim Perelman	Vertical
July 3, 2026	Lockbox	Daniel Stamm	Aura Entertainment
Upcoming
TBA	Orphans	William Brent Bell	Republic Pictures

== Television series ==
Year	Title	Creator(s)	Network	Ref.
2020	The Expecting	Ben Ketai	Quibi (Formerly); The Roku Channel (Currently)	

== Lifetime grosses ==
Year	Film	Budget	Domestic Box Office	Foreign Box Office	Total	US DVD sales	Total (with DVD sales)
1999	House on Haunted Hill	$37 million	$40.8 million	$3.5 million (A)	$44.4 million	N/A	N/A
2001	Thirteen Ghosts	$42 million	$41.7 million	$26.6 million	$68.5 million	N/A	N/A
2002	Ghost Ship	$20 million	$30.1 million	$38.2 million	$68.3 million	N/A	N/A
2003	Gothika	$40 million	$59.7 million	$81.7 million	$141.6 million	N/A	N/A
2005	House of Wax	$40 million	$32.1 million	$36.7 million	$68.8 million	N/A	N/A
2007	The Reaping	$40 million	$25.1 million	$37.6 million	$62.8 million	$19.8 million	$82.6 million
2008	RocknRolla	$15 million	$5.7 million	$20 million	$25.7 million	$7.4 million	$33.1 million
2009	Orphan	$20 million	$41,596,251	$36,741,122	$78,337,373	$12,250,443	$90,587,816
2009	Whiteout	$35 million	$10,275,638	$7,565,229	$17,840,867	$3,192,934	$21,033,801
2009	Ninja Assassin	$50 million	$38,122,883	$23,471,000	$61,593,883	$13,841,623	$75,435,506
2010	The Losers	$25 million	$23,591,432	$5,385,903	$28,977,335	$6,462,496	$35,439,831
2010	Splice	$30 million	$17,010,170	$6,964,022	$23,974,192	$3,695,686	$27,669,878

Budget	Overall Total	US DVD Sales	Total
$374 million	$646 million	$62.9 million	$708 million

(A) Indicates minimum, as that is only two countries totals merged.
