= Orphan: First Kill =

2022 film by William Brent Bell

- Release poster
- Directed by: William Brent Bell
- Screenplay by: David Coggeshall
- Story by: David Leslie Johnson-McGoldrick; Alex Mace
- Based on: Characters by Alex Mace
- Produced by: Alex Mace; Hal Sadoff; Ethan Erwin; James Tomlinson
- Starring: Isabelle Fuhrman; Rossif Sutherland; Hiro Kanagawa; Matthew Finlan; Julia Stiles
- Cinematography: Karim Hussain
- Edited by: Josh Ethier
- Music by: Brett Detar
- Production companies: Entertainment One; Dark Castle Entertainment
- Distributed by: Paramount Players
- Release dates: July 27, 2022 (Philippines); August 19, 2022 (United States)
- Running time: 98 minutes
- Country: United States
- Language: English
- Box office: $45.6 million

Orphan: First Kill is a 2022 American psychological slasher film directed by William Brent Bell and written by David Coggeshall, based on a story by David Leslie Johnson-McGoldrick and Alex Mace. It is the second installment in the titular film series, and serves as a prequel to Orphan (2009). Isabelle Fuhrman reprises her role as the titular character, starring alongside Rossif Sutherland, Hiro Kanagawa, Matthew Finlan, and Julia Stiles. Set in 2007, the film follows events that occur approximately two years before the first film.

With the working title of Esther, the project was announced in February 2020. The official title was revealed in November that same year, with Fuhrman reprising her role as Esther. Filming took place in Winnipeg, Canada, from November to December 2020.

Orphan: First Kill premiered first in other territories starting in the Philippines on July 27, 2022, and was released in the United States on August 19 by Paramount Players in select theatres, digital, and streaming via Paramount+. The film grossed $45 million worldwide and received mixed reviews from critics. A prequel titled Orphans is in development.

== Plot ==
On January 26, 2007, Leena Klammer, a 30-year-old Estonian psychiatric patient with the appearance of a 10-year-old, escapes the Saarne Institute by seducing and killing a guard, then hiding in the car of art therapist Anna. After killing Anna in her home, Leena looks up missing American girls and finds that she looks like an age projection of Esther Albright, a girl from a rich family who went missing on May 2, 2003. Leena introduces herself as "Esther" to a Russian police officer and claims her parents are in the United States.

In Darien, Connecticut, artist Allen Albright and his wife Tricia are informed by Detective Donnan that their daughter has been found. Tricia travels to Moscow and brings "Esther" home. There, Leena becomes infatuated with Allen and tries to separate him from Tricia.

While Tricia and Allen are away, Donnan arrives at the house and acquires Leena's fingerprints. When Donnan finds that the fingerprints do not match Esther's, Leena, who has been tailing him, stabs him with a knife. Tricia arrives, having followed Leena, and shoots Donnan dead. Tricia reveals that the real Esther died in 2003 during an altercation with her older brother Gunnar, which Tricia covered up. Tricia only let Leena pose as Esther to placate Allen. Leena and Tricia dispose of Donnan's body in a cellar hatch which contains the real Esther's body. They frame his disappearance as a vacation trip by forging an email to the police station.

When Leena proves too difficult to control, Tricia and Gunnar (who isn't remorseful) plot to kill her. After two unsuccessful murder attempts from both sides, Leena tries to flee by stealing Tricia's car, but she is soon found by a police officer.

After Leena is brought back to the Albright house, Tricia and Gunnar try to kill her, but Leena fights back and flees. She ambushes Gunnar in the art room with a crossbow and stabs him to death with his fencing sword. Tricia and Leena fight in the kitchen, fleeing to the roof after inadvertently setting the house on fire.

As Allen returns home, he finds Tricia and Leena clinging to the roof, calling for him. While Leena is claiming that Tricia attacked her, Tricia tries to reveal the truth about Leena. Allen helps Leena first, causing Tricia to fall to her death. When Allen checks Leena's face, her fake teeth start to fall out, revealing she is not Esther. Leena tries to justify herself and confesses her love for him, only for a shocked and disgusted Allen to call her a monster. An enraged Leena accidentally pushes him off the roof.

Leena cleans herself up and dresses up again as Esther. Later, "Esther" is moved to an orphanage and waits for a new family to adopt her.

== Cast ==
- Isabelle Fuhrman as Leena Klammer / "Esther"
- Julia Stiles as Tricia Albright
- Rossif Sutherland as Allen Albright
- Hiro Kanagawa as Detective Donnan
- Matthew Finlan as Gunnar Albright
- Samantha Walkes as Dr. Segar
- Dave Brown as Dr. Novory
- Lauren Cochrane as Officer Leahy
- Gwendolyn Collins as Anna

== Production ==
In February 2020, a prequel to Orphan, with the working title of Esther, was announced to be in development. William Brent Bell was hired as director, with a screenplay by David Coggeshall, from an original story co-written by David Leslie Johnson-McGoldrick and Alex Mace. The project was announced as a joint-venture production between Entertainment One and Dark Castle Entertainment.. Johnson-McGoldrick also served as executive producer, while Alex Mace, Hal Sadoff, Ethan Erwin, and James Tomlinson were hired as producers. In November 2020, the film's official title was announced as Orphan: First Kill, with Isabelle Fuhrman reprising her role as Esther, and Julia Stiles and Rossif Sutherland joining the cast as co-stars.

Isabelle Fuhrman later revealed that she played a key role in the project's green light following a real-life adoption scandal. In 2014, Indiana couple Kristine and Michael Barnett were charged with child abandonment of their then-9-year-old foster child with dwarfism, Natalia Grace, two years earlier by claiming her to secretly be an adult and by changing her legal age to 22. The case received widespread media attention in 2019 when the Barnetts confirmed they had been inspired to abandon Grace after watching Orphan. Fuhrman stated that she was contacted by a large number of people regarding its eerie similarities to Orphan. As this was going on, she stated that she contacted Johnson-McGoldrick regarding the potential for a follow-up film, to which he revealed that they had a prequel script written. The actress worked with the writer to further the development of the project, with the intent to serve as a producer with the potential to appear in a possible cameo role with a new actress portraying the title character, before the duo eventually elected to have Fuhrman reprise the role herself.

Principal photography began in Winnipeg in November 2020 and wrapped on December 11, of the same year. The production crew used a combination of makeup and forced perspective shots to allow Fuhrman to again portray Esther without use of CGI special effects. Two female child actors also served as body doubles for Fuhrman. Fuhrman additionally provided uncredited contributions to the script.

== Release ==
In September 2021, it was announced Paramount Pictures had acquired American distribution rights through Paramount Players to the film, unlike the previous film, which was distributed by Warner Bros. Pictures. Orphan: First Kill was released simultaneously through limited theatrical release, video on demand, and on Paramount+, on August 19, 2022. It was first released in the Philippines on July 27, 2022.

== Reception ==
=== Box office ===
Orphan: First Kill grossed $5.4 million in the United States and Canada, and $40.2 million in other territories, for a worldwide total of $45.6 million.

The film made $670,000 from 478 theaters on its first day, and went on to debut to $1.7 million in its opening weekend.

=== Critical response ===
On the review aggregator website Rotten Tomatoes, 70% of 149 critics' reviews are positive, with an average rating of 6/10. The website's consensus reads: "Leaning into its ludicrous premise, Orphan: First Kill is a sequel that holds its own -- and for fans of campy horror, may even represent an improvement on the original." Metacritic, which uses a weighted average, assigned the film a score of 54 out of 100, based on 27 critics, indicating "mixed or average" reviews.

Matt Donato from IGN gave 7 out of 10 and wrote: "Orphan: First Kill doubles down as a prequel about Esther but manages to feel so uniquely standalone thanks to some supreme storytelling swings." Richard Whittaker from The Austin Chronicle gave it 3 out of 5 stars, writing: "What makes Orphan: First Kill worthwhile is that it acknowledges the original before taking a hard left turn into overblown soapy madness. The modern gothic of the first film transforms here into a perfectly fitting explosion of operatic schlock." Lena Wilson from The Wrap wrote: "First Kill takes the best part of its predecessor—its camp value—and dials things up to 11, delivering a movie that demands to be seen at rowdy theaters and sleepovers worldwide." Alyse Wax from Collider gave a B rating, writing: "First Kill is a smart, tight film that fits perfectly into what the first Orphan film set up over a decade ago." Courtney Howard from The A.V. Club gave a B+ rating and wrote: "Offering the winning combination of a subversive spin on a well-established villain, Orphan: First Kill is a gnarly, wild and absolutely demented ride."

Leslie Felperin from The Guardian wrote: "The most disappointing thing about the film is that it has none of the spark or originality of the first one and just parasitically drains its source material, incorporating details like the creepy black-light drawings and the borderline paedophilic subtext without adding anything substantial." Clarisse Loughrey from The Independent also gave a mixed review, writing: "There's a surprising amount to enjoy here, with director William Brent Bell (behind The Boy franchise, with its equally ludicrous premise centered on a haunted doll), making the smart decision to turn the unintentional camp of Orphan into intentional camp, alongside adding a dose of satire about the corruptive pressures of the nuclear family." Chris Evangelista from SlashFilm wrote: "David Coggeshall's script has more than a few tricks up its sleeve, including some jaw-dropping twists that I will confess I did not see coming. It makes sense—the first film had a jaw-dropping twist too, after all. The twist feels fresh and exciting here, and changes the entire film in a way that's wickedly enjoyable."

Maxance Vincent from Cultured Vultures wrote: "I'll even go out on a limb and say that I had more fun watching Orphan: First Kill than I did the first one, and would highly recommend doing a double feature with both. They're some of the most fascinating horror films from a mainstream studio, and should hopefully reignite Hollywood's flame to make more horror movies that truly don't care about the audience's preconceived expectations and throw them off guard the minute they get comfortable. Now that's cinema, and you cannot convince me otherwise." Mark Hanson from Slant Magazine gave one out of four stars, writing: "William Brent Bell's film proves that not every horror concept has the potential to be franchised."

== Sequel ==
In August 2022, when asked about his approach to making the sequel, Bell stated that there would need to be a third film in order for Orphan to be considered a franchise. Later, Fuhrman expressed interest in continuing to portray the character in additional films. Bell later stated that should the prequel prove to be successful, a third film could be developed. The filmmaker expressed interest in exploring a darker third installment that would complete a full story of Leena Klammer/Esther, while stating that there could be multiple sequels:

...Isabelle [Fuhrman] is so passionate about the character – [she] can play this character forever… there's a lot to that character, and I think in the future stories, she would probably become a bit more cold-hearted again.

Fuhrman confirmed that discussions for a third film, among the creatives and studio are ongoing, stating that there would not be another "13 years this time around" before a sequel is developed. In December 2023, it was announced that a third film was officially in development. William Brent Bell will once again serve as director, while David Coggeshall will return as screenwriter. The filmmaker stated that Isabelle Fuhrman is also slated to reprise her starring role as the main character.

In November 2024, Dark Castle announced that a third film had been green-lit by Lionsgate, which would launch the project at the American Film Market. Brent Bell and Coggeshall is set to return as director and screenwriter, while Isabelle Fuhrman reprises her role as Esther. Fuhrman later expressed excitement, stating that the quality of the script is what convinced her to sign on to the project. By April 2025, the actress stated that the next installment will be an 'inbetweenquel' as it will depict separate events that take place after Orphan (2009), as well as the prequel Orphan: First Kill (2022). Filming began in November 2025 and was announced to be titled Orphans.

== See also ==
- The Imposter
