= Isabelle Fuhrman =

American actress (born 1997)

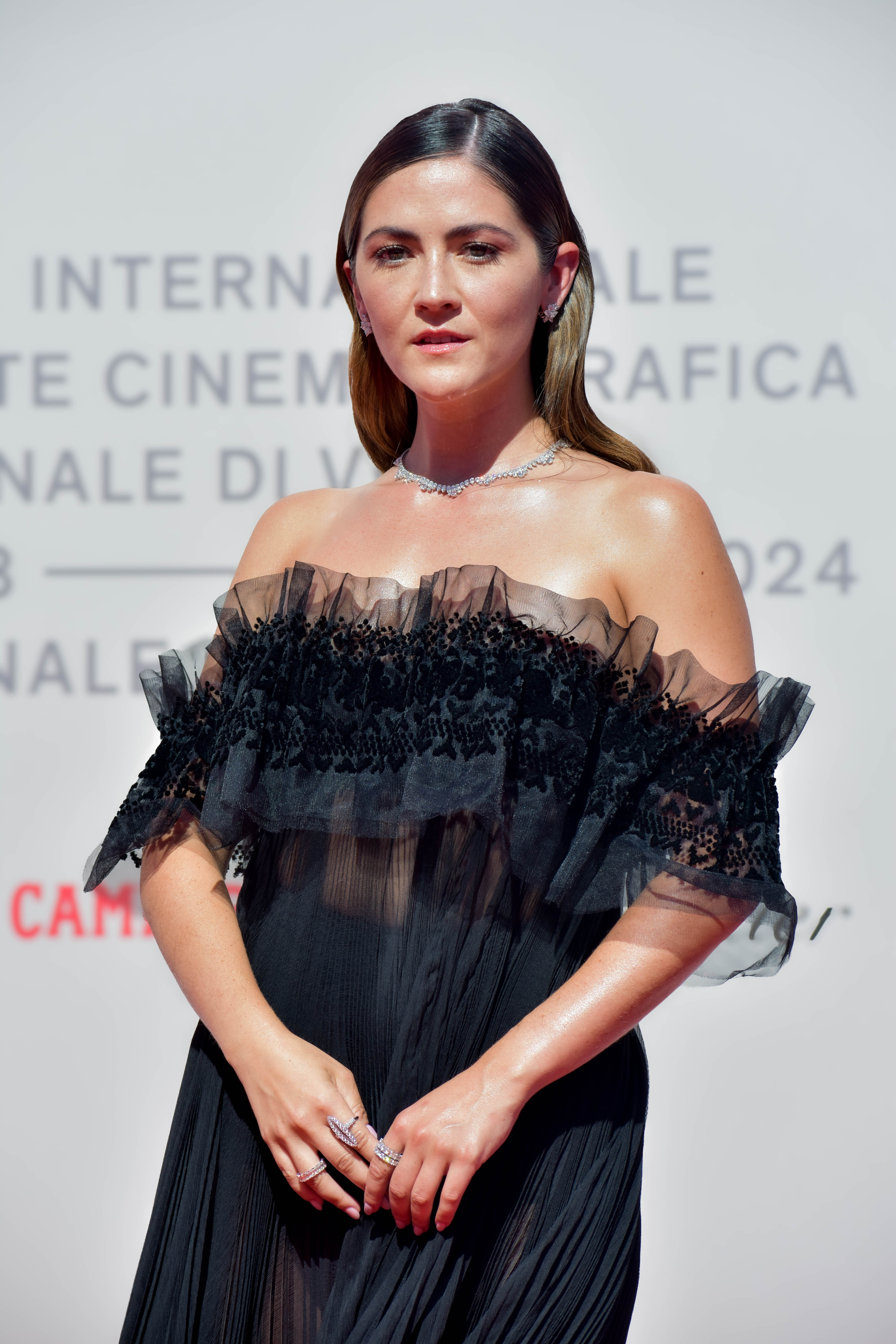
- Fuhrman in 2024
- Born: February 25, 1997 (age 29); Washington, D.C., U.S.
- Education: Stanford Online High School
- Occupation: Actress
- Years active: 2005–present
- Parents: Nick Fuhrman (father); Elina Fuhrman (mother)

Isabelle Fuhrman (born February 25, 1997) is an American actress. She is known for her breakthrough role as Esther in the horror film Orphan (2009) and its prequel Orphan: First Kill (2022). She played Clove in the dystopian adventure film The Hunger Games (2012), Alex in the independent film The Novice (2021), and Diamond in the Western film series Horizon: An American Saga (2024–present).

== Early life ==
Fuhrman was born in Washington, D.C., the daughter of Elina Fuhrman (née Kozmits), a journalist, author, wellness activist, and founder of the vegan soup company Soupelina, and Nick Fuhrman (1963–2024), a one-time Wisconsin primary candidate for the U.S. House of Representatives, former Dane County Republican Party chairman and business consultant. Her father, who was of Irish descent, was adopted by a Jewish family. Her mother is a Russian Jewish immigrant from Soviet Moldova. Fuhrman has an older sister who was born in 1993. She and her family moved to Atlanta in 1999 when her mother joined CNN. She attended the Buckley School, a private school in Sherman Oaks for high school. Fuhrman also briefly attended the RADA, and briefly was a student at The Westminster Schools in Atlanta. She graduated from Stanford Online High School in 2015.

== Career ==
Fuhrman's acting career began at age seven, when a casting director from Cartoon Network spotted her while she was waiting for her older sister Madeline and cast her for one of the shows, Cartoon Fridays. Her early credits include Grace O'Neil in the pilot episode of the 2006 television series Justice, and a number of national commercials for such brands as Pizza Hut and K-Mart. In 2007, she made her film debut in the controversial drama feature Hounddog.

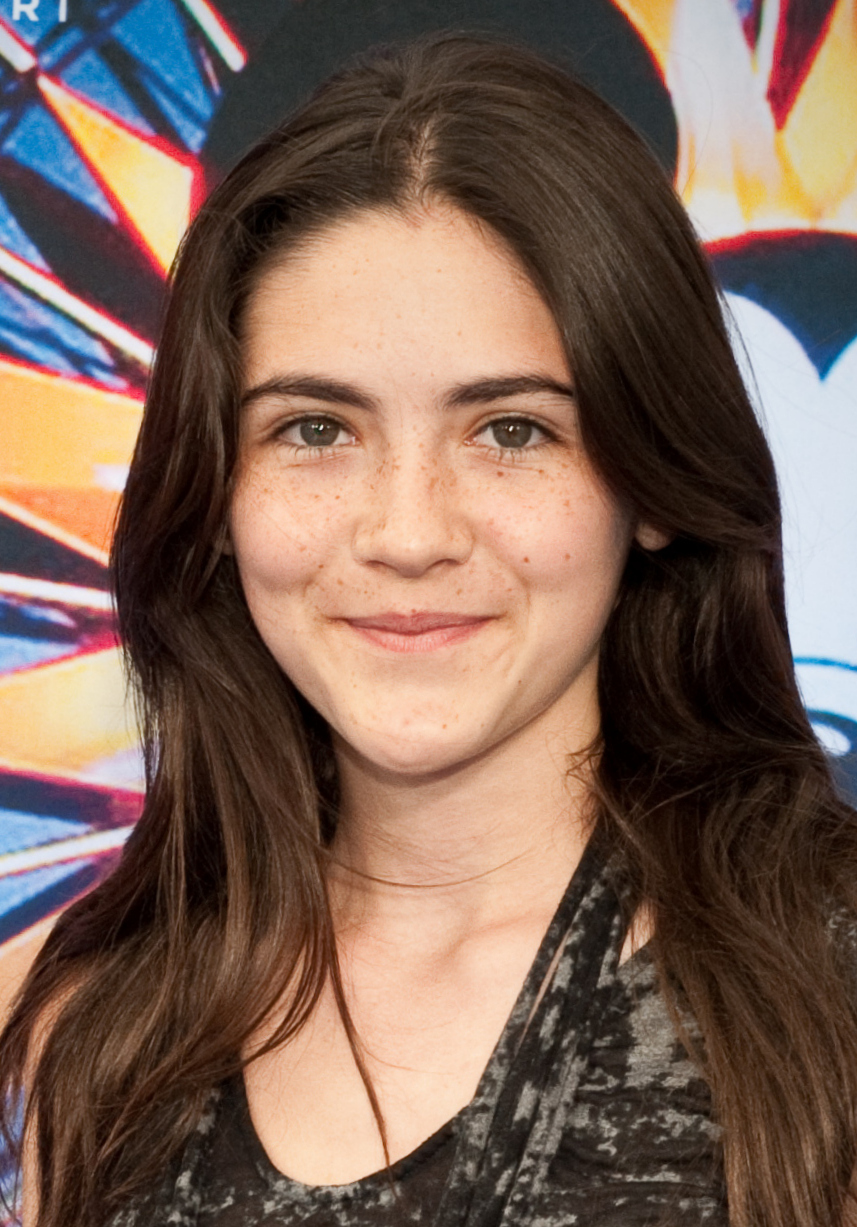
Fuhrman in 2010

Fuhrman's performance as Gretchen Dennis (also known as Girl Ghost) opposite Jennifer Love Hewitt in a 2008 episode of Ghost Whisperer earned her a Young Artist Award nomination. Also in 2008, Fuhrman was cast in the movie Orphan alongside Vera Farmiga and Peter Sarsgaard following an exhaustive nationwide search of young actresses to portray the lead in the three-way collaboration between Warner Bros., Appian Way Productions, and Dark Castle Entertainment. It was released in 2009 to commercial success and Fuhrman's acting was praised. She also appeared in comedy skits on The Tonight Show with Jay Leno.

In 2011, Fuhrman played Angie Vanderveer in the dark comedy Salvation Boulevard (based on the novel by Larry Beinhart), with an ensemble cast that included Pierce Brosnan and Marisa Tomei. It premiered at the Sundance Film Festival.

In 2012, Fuhrman voiced the genetically enhanced assassin Victoria in Hitman: Absolution. In the same year she played Clove, a career tribute who tries to kill the main character, Katniss, in the film The Hunger Games. She originally auditioned to play Katniss, but was too young to play the part; she was 14 at the time. She received a call-back to audition for Clove and got the part. On May 15, 2012, it was announced that Fuhrman would star in the remake of the 1977 horror classic Suspiria; however, it was later announced that the production was stuck in legal woes and that the film would not be made.

On May 24, 2013, Fuhrman was cast as Max in Dear Eleanor (2016), directed by Kevin Connolly. In 2014, Fuhrman was cast in the film Cell, an adaptation by Stephen King. In 2015, she was cast in a "major recurring role" on the Showtime drama series Masters of Sex, playing Tessa, the daughter of Virginia Johnson (Lizzy Caplan). Fuhrman was also cast as the lead in the independent drama Hellbent.

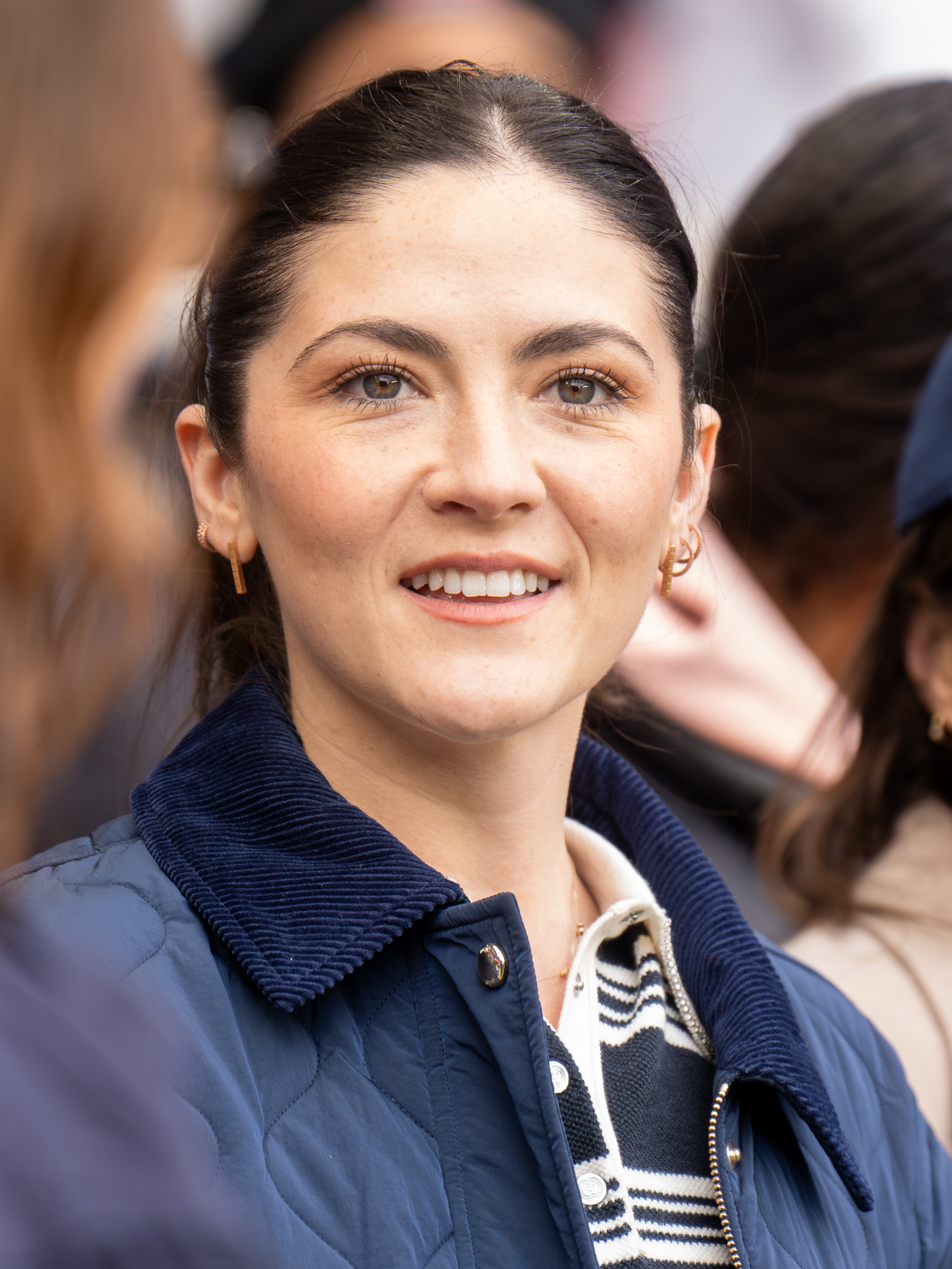
Fuhrman in 2026

In 2021, Fuhrman starred as Alex in Lauren Hadaway's directorial debut The Novice. Her performance gained critical praise, with critics calling Fuhrman's turn "a Daniel Day-Lewis transformation" and "the year's best performance". For The Novice, she won the Tribeca Film Festival Award for Best Actress, and was nominated for the Independent Spirit Award for Best Female Lead. It was announced in 2020 that Fuhrman would reprise her role as Esther in an Orphan prequel; the film, titled Orphan: First Kill, was released in August 2022, with Fuhrman's performance again being lauded.

In September 2022, Fuhrman joined the cast of the Kevin Costner-directed western film Horizon: An American Saga and Face, a film directed by Justine Bateman.

Fuhrman starred as Charlotte in the leading role opposite Mena Massoud in Julia Stiles' romance drama film Wish You Were Here which was released on January 17, 2025.

== Philanthropy ==
Fuhrman was approached by Save the Children in 2010, to be a celebrity advocate for their "Caps for Good" project. She and several volunteers with Save the Children have helped knit hundreds of baby caps in an effort to reduce the death rate of newborns in developing countries. Fuhrman is on the advisory board of the Love & Art Kids Foundation, a Los Angeles based non-profit organization.

== Filmography ==
Key
†	Denotes films that have not yet been released

=== Film ===
Year	Title	Role	Notes
2007	Hounddog	Grasshopper	
2009	Orphan	Leena Klammer / Esther Coleman	
2010	Sammy's Adventures: The Secret Passage	Hatchling Shelly	Voice role
2011	Salvation Boulevard	Angie	
2011	From Up on Poppy Hill	Sora Matsuzaki	Voice role
2012	The Hunger Games	Clove	
2013	Don't Let Me Go	Michelle	Also titled The Healer and The Between
2013	After Earth	Rayna	Uncredited
2014	All the Wilderness	Val	
2014	The Snow Queen 2	Alfida	Voice role (English version)
2016	Cell	Alice Maxwell	
2016	Dear Eleanor	Max the Wax	
2016	1 Night	Bea	
2018	Down a Dark Hall	Izzy	
2018	Good Girls Get High	Morgan	
2018	Hellbent	Danni Frost	
2020	Tape	Pearl	
2021	The Novice	Alex	
2021	The Last Thing Mary Saw	Eleanor	
2021	Escape Room: Tournament of Champions	Claire	Extended edition version
2022	Orphan: First Kill	Leena Klammer / Esther Albright	
2023	Sheroes	Ezra	
2024	Horizon: An American Saga – Chapter 1	Diamond Kittredge	
2024	Unit 234: The Lock Up	Laurie Saltair	
2024	Horizon: An American Saga – Chapter 2	Diamond Kittredge	
2025	Wish You Were Here	Charlotte	Also executive producer
2026	Signal One	Annika Kask	
2026	Street Smart	Ali	Also executive producer
2026	The Pond	Hope	
TBA	The 99'ers †	Joy Fawcett	Filming
TBA	Orphans †	Leena Klammer / Esther Albright–Coleman	Post-production; also executive producer

=== Television ===
Year	Title	Role	Notes
2006	Justice	Grace O'Neil	Episode: Pilot
2008	Ghost Whisperer	Gretchen Dennis	Episode: "Pieces of You"
2010	Pleading Guilty	Carrie	Television film
2011	The Whole Truth	Lyric Byrne	Episode: "Perfect Witness"
2013, 2020	Adventure Time	Shoko	Voice role; episodes: "The Vault", "Together Again"
2015	Masters of Sex	Tessa Johnson	Recurring role, 8 episodes

=== Video games ===
Year	Title	Role	Notes
2007	Disney Princess: Enchanted Journey	Heroine	Voice role
2012	Hitman: Absolution	Victoria	Voice role
2016	Let It Die	Mushroom Magistrate	Voice role
2016	Sid Meier's Civilization VI	Quote	Technology quote

=== Stage ===
Year	Title	Role	Stage	Notes
2017	All the Fine Boys	Emily	Pershing Square Signature Center	
2019	Mac Beth	Macbeth	Lucille Lortel Theatre	

== Awards and nominations ==
Year	Award	Category	Work	Result	Refs
2009	Young Artist Awards	Best Performance in a TV Series – Guest Starring Young Actress	Ghost Whisperer	Nominated	
2009	Dublin Film Critics' Circle Awards	Best Actress – 4th place	Orphan	Won	
2009	Fright Meter Awards	Best Actress	Orphan	Won	
2010	Fangoria Chainsaw Awards	Best Supporting Actress	Orphan	Nominated	
2014	Behind the Voice Actors Awards	Best Vocal Ensemble in an Anime Feature Film/Special	From Up on Poppy Hill	Nominated	
2016	Madrid International Film Festival	Best Lead Actress	Don't Let Me Go	Nominated	
2021	Tribeca Film Festival	Best Actress in a Leading Role	The Novice	Won	
2022	Independent Spirit Awards	Best Female Lead	The Novice	Nominated	
