= Paramount Players =

American film studio division of Paramount Pictures

- Type: Division
- Industry: Motion picture
- Founded: June 7, 2017; 9 years ago
- Founder: Jim Gianopulos
- Headquarters: Los Angeles, California, U.S.
- Area served: Worldwide
- Key people: Jeremy Kramer (president)
- Products: Film production
- Parent: Paramount Pictures

Paramount Players is an American film production label of Paramount Pictures, focusing on "contemporary properties." The division was founded on June 7, 2017, and its name alludes to the company's earliest origins as Famous Players Film Company, before its 1914 founding by William Wadsworth Hodkinson.

== History ==
On June 7, 2017, Jim Gianopulos, who joined Paramount Pictures as the chairman and CEO in March, announced the launch of the Paramount Players division with Brian Robbins, the founder and former CEO of AwesomenessTV, as president. Robbins will work with Viacom's Nickelodeon, MTV, Comedy Central and BET operations to generate projects while the new division focuses on "contemporary properties." The division was created after Paramount and Viacom expressed disappointment at Comedy Central stars Jordan Peele and Amy Schumer producing their own films (2017's Get Out and 2015's Trainwreck, respectively) for Universal Pictures due to feeling "unwelcome" by Paramount's former executives.

On August 17, 2017, Paramount Players acquired its first project, which is a film adaptation of the book Vacation Guide to the Solar System by Jonathan Goldstein and John Francis Daley.

On October 1, 2018, Brian Robbins left his position as the president of Paramount Players after Viacom tapped him to be the president of Nickelodeon, ending his 16-month run at the studio. Despite leaving the studio, he will remain involved with Paramount Players' Nickelodeon films (Dora and the Lost City of Gold and Playing with Fire). Wyck Godfrey, the president of Paramount Motion Picture Group, is serving as interim and will oversee day-to-day operations with support from Robbins until Paramount finds a new president for the studio.

On June 30, 2020, Emma Watts replaced Wyck Godfrey as the president of Paramount Motion Picture Group and began on July 20 (Godfrey returned to producing). In October, Watts tapped Jeremy Kramer as president.

On March 8, 2022, Kramer stepped down and the studio's operations were merged into the purview of Mike Ireland and Daria Cercek, the head executives of the Paramount Pictures Motion Picture Group, though Paramount Players and its current film inventory remains otherwise unaffected.

== Films ==
=== Released films ===
Release date	Title	Notes	Ref(s)
November 2, 2018	Nobody's Fool	Co-produced by Tyler Perry Studios and BET Films	
February 8, 2019	What Men Want	Co-produced by Will Packer Productions and BET Films	
August 9, 2019	Dora and the Lost City of Gold	Co-produced by Nickelodeon Movies, Walden Media, Media Rights Capital and Burr! Productions	
October 18, 2019	Eli	Distributed by Netflix; co-produced by MTV Films, Intrepid Pictures and Bellevue Productions	
November 8, 2019	Playing with Fire	Co-produced by Nickelodeon Movies, Walden Media and Broken Road Productions	
May 19, 2020	Body Cam	Co-produced by Ace Entertainment and BET Films	
October 30, 2020	Spell	Co-produced with LINK Entertainment and MC8 Entertainment	
October 29, 2021	Paranormal Activity: Next of Kin	Distributed by Paramount+; co-produced with Blumhouse Productions	
February 11, 2022	The In Between	Distributed by Paramount+ in the United States and Netflix in all other regions	
May 13, 2022	Senior Year	Distributed by Netflix; co-produced with Broken Road Productions	
June 17, 2022	Jerry & Marge Go Large	Distributed by Paramount+; co-produced with Landline Films and Levantine Films	
August 19, 2022	Orphan: First Kill	Co-produced by Dark Castle Entertainment, Entertainment One and Sierra/Affinity	
September 23, 2022	On the Come Up	Distributed by Paramount+; co-produced with Temple Hill Entertainment and State Street Pictures	
September 30, 2022	Smile	Co-produced by Temple Hill Entertainment	
October 7, 2022	Significant Other	Distributed by Paramount+; co-production with Quay Street Productions	
October 6, 2023	Pet Sematary: Bloodlines	Distributed by Paramount+; co-production with Di Bonaventura Pictures and Room 101, Inc.	
September 27, 2024	Apartment 7A	Distributed by Paramount+; co-produced with Sunday Night Productions and Platinum Dunes	

== Highest-grossing films ==
Highest-grossing films
Rank	Title	Year	Worldwide gross	Budget
1	Smile	2022	$217.4 million	$17 million
2	Smile 2	2024	$138.1 million	$28 million
3	Dora and the Lost City of Gold	2019	$120.6 million	$49 million
4	Mean Girls	2024	$104.4 million	$36 million
5	What Men Want	2019	$72.2 million	$20 million
6	Playing with Fire	2019	$68.6 million	$30 million
7	Orphan: First Kill	2022	$44 million	—N/a
8	Nobody's Fool	2018	$33.5 million	$19 million
