= List of STX Entertainment films =

The following is a list of films produced and/or released by STX Entertainment. The studio's first film released in 2015 was The Gift, written, co-produced and directed by Joel Edgerton and starring Jason Bateman and Rebecca Hall.

== 2010s ==
Release date	Film	Co-production with
August 7, 2015	The Gift	North American and Chinese distribution only; Blumhouse Productions, H. Brothers, Blue-Tongue Films, Ahimsa Films;
November 20, 2015	Secret in Their Eyes	American distribution only; Gran Via Productions, IM Global, Route One, Site Productions, Union Investment Partners, Willies Movies AIE
January 22, 2016	The Boy	Lakeshore Entertainment, Huayi Brothers Pictures, Vertigo Entertainment
April 8, 2016	Hardcore Henry	distribution only; Huayi Brothers Pictures, Bazelevs, Versus Pictures
June 24, 2016	Free State of Jones	American and Chinese distribution only; Huayi Brothers, Tang Media Productions, Route One Entertainment, IM Global, Swing Lake Entertainment, Bluegrass Films, Larger Than Life Productions, Vendian Entertainment
July 29, 2016	Bad Moms	Huayi Brothers, Tang Media Productions, Bill Block Media, Suzanne Todd Productions, Virgin Produced
October 14, 2016	Desierto	North American distribution only; Esperanto Kino, CG Cinema, Orange Studio, Itaca Films, Lava Bear Films, IM Global
November 18, 2016	The Edge of Seventeen	Huayi Brothers, Tang Media Productions, Gracie Films, Virgin Produced
January 13, 2017	The Bye Bye Man	Huayi Brothers, Los Angeles Media Fund, Tang Media Productions, Intrepid Pictures
February 3, 2017	The Space Between Us	Huayi Brothers Pictures, Los Angeles Media Fund, Southpaw Entertainment, Scarlet Fire Entertainment, Virgin Produced
April 7, 2017	Their Finest	American co-distribution with EuropaCorp only; BBC Films, Welsh Screen, Pinewood Pictures, Ingenious Media, HanWay Films, Ripken Productions, Film i Väst, Filmgate Films, Wildgaze Films, Number 9 Films
April 28, 2017	The Circle	American co-distribution with EuropaCorp only; Image Nation Abu Dhabi, Playtone, Likely Story, IM Global
July 21, 2017	Valerian and the City of a Thousand Planets	American distribution only; EuropaCorp, TF1 Films Production, Fundamental Films, BNP Paribas, Orange Studio, Novo Pictures, River Road Entertainment, Belga Films
August 4, 2017	Wind River	British and Irish distribution only; Acacia Entertainment, Savy Media Holdings, Synergic Films, Thunder Road Films and Film 44
September 8, 2017	Home Again	British and Irish distribution only; Black Bicycle Entertainment and Waverly Films
October 13, 2017	The Foreigner	Sparkle Roll Media, Wanda Pictures, Huayi Brothers, TMP, The Fyzz Facility, Orange Corp.
October 27, 2017	Breathe	British and Irish distribution only; Participant Media, Silver Reel Entertainment, BBC Films, British Film Institute, Embankment Films, and The Imaginarium Studios
November 3, 2017	A Bad Moms Christmas	Huayi Brothers Pictures; Tang Media Partners
December 25, 2017	Molly's Game	American and Chinese distribution only; Huayi Brothers, TMP, The Mark Gordon Company, Pascal Pictures
December 25, 2017	All the Money in the World	International distribution outside the United Kingdom and Ireland only; Imperative Entertainment and Scott Free Productions
January 19, 2018	Den of Thieves	Diamond Film Productions, Tucker Tooley Entertainment, G-BASE
March 9, 2018	Gringo	International and American home media distribution only; Amazon Studios, Denver and Delilah Productions, Blue-Tongue Films
April 20, 2018	I Feel Pretty	American, British and Irish distribution only; Huayi Brothers, Tang Media Productions, Voltage Pictures, Wonderland Sound and Vision
June 1, 2018	Adrift	Lakeshore Entertainment, Huayi Brothers, Ingenious Media, RVK Studios
June 1, 2018	American Animals	British and Irish distribution only; AI Film, Film4 Productions, Lava Bear Films, RAW; distributed by The Orchard and MoviePass Ventures in the United States;
August 17, 2018	Mile 22	Huayi Brothers, The Hideaway Entertainment, Tang Media Productions
August 24, 2018	The Happytime Murders	Huayi Brothers, Black Bear Pictures, TMP, Henson Alternative, On the Day Productions
September 7, 2018	Peppermint	Lakeshore Entertainment, Huayi Brothers, Tang Media Productions
December 7, 2018	Ben Is Back	British and Irish distribution only; Black Bear Pictures, 30West, Color Force; distributed in the United States by Lionsgate, Roadside Attractions and LD Entertainment
December 21, 2018	Second Act	Huayi Brothers, TMP, Nuyorican Productions
January 11, 2019	The Upside	co-distribution with Lantern Entertainment; Escape Artists
April 5, 2019	The Best of Enemies	American distribution only; Astute Films, Material Pictures
May 3, 2019	UglyDolls	distribution outside China only; Alibaba Pictures, Reel FX Creative Studios, Huaxia Film Distribution, Original Force, Troublemaker Studios
May 10, 2019	Poms	American distribution only; Entertainment One, Sierra/Affinity, Mad as Birds, Rose Pictures
September 13, 2019	Hustlers	Gloria Sanchez Productions, Nuyorican Productions, Annapurna Pictures
October 25, 2019	Countdown	Boies/Schiller Film Group, Two Grown Men, Wrigley Pictures
November 22, 2019	21 Bridges	MWM Studios, Huayi Brothers, AGBO Films, X-Ception Content
November 27, 2019	The Irishman	Chinese co-distribution with Media Asia Films only; Netflix, TriBeCa Productions, Sikelia Productions, Winkler Films
December 6, 2019	Playmobil: The Movie	American distribution only; Method Animation, ON Animation Studios, DMG Entertainment

== 2020s ==
Release date	Film	Co-production with	Notes
January 24, 2020	The Gentlemen	Miramax and Toff Guy Films	American distribution only
February 21, 2020	Brahms: The Boy II	Lakeshore Entertainment	North American and select international distribution only
June 26, 2020	My Spy	MWM Studios	select international distribution; Distributed by Amazon Studios in the United States and select international territories
July 24, 2020	The Rental	Black Bear Pictures	international distribution only; distributed by IFC Films in the United States
August 7, 2020	The Secret Garden	StudioCanal and Heyday Films	North American distribution only
August 7, 2020	Work It	Alloy Entertainment	distributed by Netflix
December 11, 2020	Songbird	Invisible Narratives, Platinum Dunes and Catchlight Studios	North American, British and Irish distribution only
December 18, 2020	Greenland	Anton, Thunder Road and G-Base Film Production	
January 12, 2021	Horizon Line	SF Film Production	distribution outside Scandinavia
January 22, 2021	Our Friend	Black Bear Pictures and Scott Free Productions	International distribution only; distributed by Gravitas Ventures in the United States
February 12, 2021	Me You Madness	Highland Film Group and Stormchaser Films	American distribution only
February 12, 2021	The Mauritanian	30West, Topic Studios and BBC Film	
February 19, 2021	I Care a Lot	Black Bear Pictures	select international distribution and studio credit only; distributed by Netflix in the United States and select international territories
March 12, 2021	Kid 90	Appian Way Productions	distributed by Hulu
July 14, 2021	Gunpowder Milkshake	StudioCanal, The Picture Company, Babelsberg Studio, StudioCanal GmbH, Canal+ and Ciné+	Latin American and Chinese distribution only; co-distributed in North America by Netflix
September 10, 2021	Queenpins	AGC Studios, Red Hour Productions and Marquee Entertainment	co-distributed with Paramount+ and Showtime in the United States
September 15, 2021	My Son	MadRiver Pictures, Une Hirondelle Productions and Sixteen Films	British, Irish, Benelux and Chinese distribution only; co-distributed in the United States by Peacock and The Roku Channel and the United Kingdom, Ireland, Latin America, Canada, the Benelux, Spain, Italy, Australia and New Zealand by Amazon Prime Video
September 17, 2021	Copshop	Raven Capital Management, G-BASE Film Production, WarParty Films, Sculptor Media and Zero Gravity Management	international distribution only; distributed by Open Road Films and Briarcliff Entertainment in the United States.
November 5, 2021	Spencer	FilmNation Entertainment, Komplizen Film, Fabula and Shoebox Films	British, Irish, French, Italian and Benelux distribution only; Distributed by Neon in the United States; last film to be distributed by STX Entertainment in the United Kingdom before shutting down on July 28, 2022.
December 10, 2021	National Champions	Thunder Road Films and game1	last film to be distributed by STX Entertainment in the United States before shutting down.
April 1, 2022	The Contractor	30West and Thunder Road Films	international distribution and studio credit only; distributed by Paramount Pictures and Showtime in the United States.
April 29, 2022	Memory	Black Bear Pictures, Welle Entertainment and Saville Productions	international distribution only; distributed by Open Road Films and Briarcliff Entertainment in the United States.
November 23, 2022	Devotion	Black Label Media	international distribution and studio credit only; distributed theatrically in North America by Columbia Pictures and Stage 6 Films through Sony Pictures Releasing and on American home video by Paramount Pictures
November 25, 2022	The Son	Film4, See-Saw Films, Ingenious Media, Embankment Films and Orange Studio	Benelux, Italian, Scandinavian and Icelandic distribution only; distributed in the United States, Eastern Europe, Turkey, China, India and Southeast Asia by Sony Pictures Classics and co-distributed in the United Kingdom by Black Bear Pictures
December 7, 2022	Bed Rest	Project X Entertainment	international distribution only; distributed by Tubi in the United States.
December 29, 2022	A Man Called Otto	Columbia Pictures, SF Studios Artistic Films, Playtone, 2DUX², Stage 6 Films, Big Indie	studio credit only; distributed by Sony Pictures Releasing
March 3, 2023	Operation Fortune: Ruse de Guerre	Miramax and Toff Guy Films	international distribution and studio credit only; distributed by Lionsgate in the United States.
April 21, 2023	Guy Ritchie's The Covenant	Toff Guy Films	international distribution only; distributed by Metro-Goldwyn-Mayer in the United States.
November 3, 2023	The Marsh King's Daughter	Black Bear Pictures and Anonymous Content	international distribution only; co-distributed by Lionsgate and Roadside Attractions in the United States.
December 25, 2023	Ferrari	Moto Productions and Forward Pass	international distribution and studio credit only; distributed by Neon in the United States.
April 16, 2024	Half Baked: Totally High	Universal 1440 Entertainment	distributed by Universal Pictures Home Entertainment
June 14, 2024	Firebrand	Brouhaha Entertainment and Magnolia Mae Films	British and Irish co-distribution with Amazon Prime Video and MetFilm Distribution only; distributed in the U.S. by Roadside Attractions and Vertical
July 18, 2024	My Spy: The Eternal City	MWM Studios, Dogbone Entertainment, Good Fear Content, Lupin Film, Madison Wells and NV Films	distributed by Amazon MGM Studios
August 23, 2024	Strange Darling	Miramax and Spooky Pictures	American digital distribution only; distributed by Magenta Light Studios in North America
September 19, 2025	Waltzing with Brando	Filmin'Tahiti and Deano Productions	American digital distribution only; distributed by Iconic Events Releasing in North America
January 9, 2026	Greenland 2: Migration	Anton, Thunder Road Films and G-BASE Film Production	co-distributed in the United States by Lionsgate and internationally by Black Bear International

== Upcoming films ==
=== Undated films ===
Release date	Film	Co-production with	Notes	Production status
TBA	Bigfoot	Citizen Skull Productions		In development
TBA	Happy Hours	Maven Screen Media, Bond Street Station and Crown Productions		In production
TBA	Fast & Loose	87North Productions, Westbrook and Jerry Bruckheimer Films	Distributed by Netflix	Pre-production
TBA	Muscle	Roth/Kirschenbaum Films, One Race Films and Fenix Studios		Pre-production
TBA	New York Will Eat You Alive	Tencent Pictures		Pre-production
TBA	PRƎPPY	Aggregate Films		Filming
TBA	Shout It Out Loud	Wonderland Sound and Vision	Distributed in the United States by Lionsgate	
TBA	That'll Be the Day	BMG, Prix Productions and Stuart Benjamin Productions		In development

== See also ==
- Category:Lists of films by studio
