= Rob Friedman =

American media executive (born 1950)

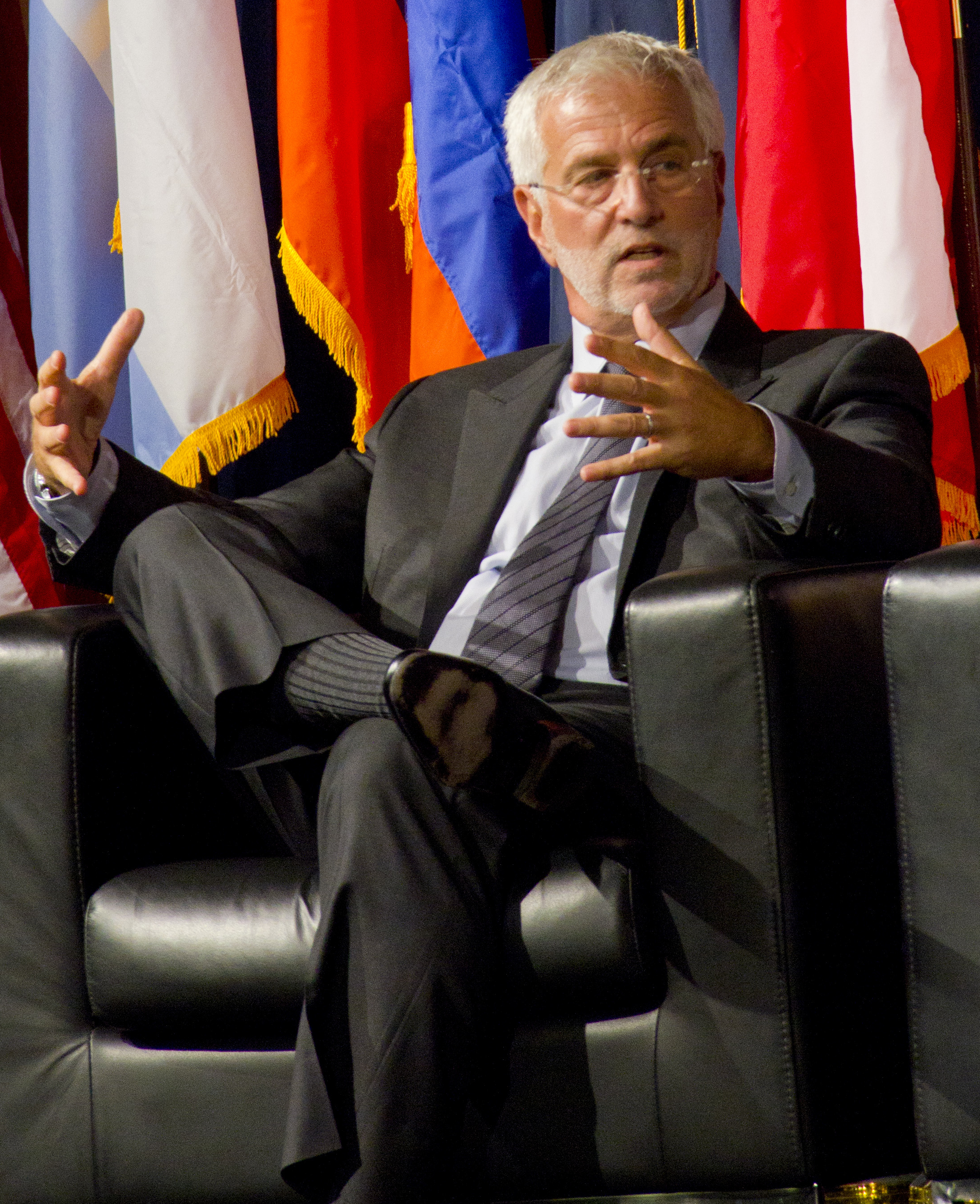
- Rob Friedman, 2012
- Occupation: Entertainment media executive
- Known for: Co-Chairman of Lionsgate Motion Picture Group

Rob Friedman (born 1950) is an American media executive. He is currently the CEO of Ascendant Entertainment.

Friedman served as Co-Chairman of Lionsgate Motion Picture Group, overseeing all aspects of Lionsgate’s domestic and international feature film acquisition, production and distribution as well as the home entertainment releases of theatrical feature films. He stepped down in 2016. Friedman joined Lionsgate in January 2012 following the company’s acquisition of the worldwide filmed entertainment studio Summit Entertainment where he served as the Co-Chairman and CEO since 2007.

Friedman has helped guide the strategy for some of Hollywood’s biggest franchises, including launching the Batman Franchise, The Hunger Games, the Twilight films, and the John Wick franchise.

Friedman started his career in 1970 in the mailroom at Warner Bros. Studios and in the subsequent 27 years he held many posts ultimately rising to become the studio's President of Worldwide Advertising and Publicity.

In 1997, Friedman moved to Paramount Pictures as Vice Chairman of the Paramount Motion Pictures Group. In 2000, he also added the role Chief Operating Officer, ultimately overseeing seven divisions. He created the studio's specialty film division then known as Paramount Classics. Friedman also served on the Board of Directors of UIP, the joint international distribution venture between Paramount and Universal Studios, and Movie Link, one of the internet's first legal film download to view sites.

In 2017, Friedman joined Tang Media Partners as CEO and chairman of TMP Entertainment. TMP's entertainment holdings merged to become Global Road Entertainment and Friedman became chairman and CEO of the Global Road Entertainment studio. He left these positions in November 2018 and launched Ascendant Entertainment.

He is a member of the Wilshire Boulevard Temple. He was a prominent supporter of Hillary Clinton in her 2016 presidential campaign.

== Career ==
=== Early Warner Bros. Career ===
Friedman began his career at Warner Bros., where he worked for 27 years and held roles including nine years as President of Worldwide Advertising and Publicity. Friedman's campaigns at Warner Bros. contributed to the success of several major franchises and films, including Batman, Lethal Weapon, Ace Ventura, and Twister. He launched Academy Award winning movies such as The Fugitive, Unforgiven, and many others. During Friedman's tenure, Warner Bros. was the top ranked studio in domestic box office share in 1989 and from 1991 through 1993. It was second only to Disney in his years after that.

==== Superman Marketing (1978 - 1981) ====
While at Warner Bros., Rob Friedman was considered key in the marketing of the movie and franchise Superman. Friedman worked closely with then Vice President Bud Rosenthal on marketing both Superman: The Movie (1978) and Superman II (1981). For the first Superman film, Friedman faced the challenge of marketing a very expensive film while avoiding the perception that it was "a cartoon or a quickie Saturday matinee serial." The marketing strategy included stylizing the Superman "S" logo in silver and blue rather than the comic book's red and yellow to appeal to adult audiences. In the New York Times, with "Superman II," Friedman revealed an unprecedented distribution strategy, in which the film was shown abroad before its U.S. release. This recouped costs quickly while timing each country's release with its peak moviegoing period.

Batman (1989 - 1995)

As president of worldwide advertising and publicity at Warner Bros., Friedman oversaw the marketing campaign for Tim Burton's Batman (1989), which "rewrote the playbook" for blockbuster film promotion and established the modern approach to superhero movie marketing. The campaign featured an innovative music-free teaser trailer and a redesigned bat logo that generated significant public interest months before release. The first film in the franchise alone brought in $251 million at the worldwide box office, at the time ranking it sixth on the list of top-grossing films of all time, and the logo became a cultural phenomenon, appearing on over 30 million T-shirts and generating over $750 million in merchandise sales. Friedman is credited with the marketing success of the Batman franchise during his tenure.

Ace Ventura (1994, 1995)

Friedman oversaw the marketing for both Ace Ventura films during his tenure at Warner Bros. The success of this franchise demonstrated Friedman's understanding of audience appeal. Speaking about the role of film critics in 1995, Friedman noted, "At the end of the day, it is up to the public to choose the movies they want to see regardless of critical response."

=== Paramount (1997-2005) ===
Friedman moved to Paramount Pictures as Vice Chairman of the Paramount Motion Picture Group in 1997. There, he created Paramount’s specialty film division, Paramount Classics. At Paramount, Friedman was responsible for worldwide theatrical marketing and distribution of feature films, worldwide marketing and distribution of videos and acquisition of films. He later served as chief operating officer.

Titanic (1997)

As Vice Chairman of the Paramount Motion Picture Group, Friedman shepherded Titanic (1997). The film opened on December 19, 1997, and spent an unprecedented 15 consecutive weekends at No. 1 at the box office. Friedman's Oscar campaign emphasized dignity and reverence, given the film's commercial success amidst the historic tragedy. "The whole idea with the movie was to conduct ourselves with dignity and not forget the event [the sinking of the Titanic] itself… There was always a reverential tone to the campaign, both the direct marketing and the distribution campaign," Friedman explained. Titanic won 11 Academy Awards, tying the record held by Ben-Hur for 38 years until then.

The Truman Show (1998)

As Paramount's Vice Chairman and marketing chief, Friedman oversaw the marketing campaign for The Truman Show (1998). The film marked Jim Carrey's first dramatic role. The marketing strategy successfully attracted a more diverse demographic than Carrey's previous films, with 52% female and 52% adult attendance, and the film opened with a strong per-screen attendance, second among all Jim Carrey's films until then.

Lara Croft Franchise

As Vice Chairman at Paramount, Friedman vocally championed women protagonists in film, noting Paramount’s Lara Croft movie, which starred Angelina Jolie and opened at $48.2 million, set a new opening record for a female-star driven vehicle. In June 2001, Friedman announced plans to develop the Lara Croft franchise following the success of the first film, and USA Today credited this success with proving "the increasing strength of women on the big screen."

War of the Worlds (2005)

In 2005, while Vice Chairman for Motion Pictures at Paramount, Friedman oversaw War of the Worlds, directed by Stephen Spielberg. The movie opened at number one at the box office Fourth of July weekend and had the second biggest Fourth of July weekend opening in movie history.

=== Summit Entertainment (2007-2012) ===
Friedman founded Summit Entertainment, producers of movies such as the Twilight Saga and Hurt Locker. In 2007, Friedman and Patrick Wachsberger launched Summit Entertainment LLC with more than $1 billion in funding from Merrill Lynch and other investors. Friedman served as CEO and co-chairman. Friedman built Summit Entertainment into a leading motion picture production and distribution company.

Twilight Franchise

In 2007, Rob Friedman, with Summit partner Wachsberger, optioned the rights to Twilight, turning the series into a billion-dollar global franchise. In August 2008, Summit Entertainment, under Friedman's leadership as co-chairman and chief executive, announced the November 21 release date for Twilight, the film adaptation of Stephenie Meyer's best-selling novel. Friedman identified an opening in the summer schedule and positioned "Twilight" strategically, amidst growing momentum for the film. The series became one of the most successful for a Young Adult property. In November 2011, Twilight Saga: Breaking Dawn Part 1, the fourth installment in the vampire series, was released mid November 2011. Within its first two weeks, it surpassed $500 million at the worldwide box office. "We couldn't be more pleased with the success of this film," said Rob Friedman and Patrick Wachsberger, co-chairmen of Summit Entertainment. The franchise’s five films grossed more than $3.3 billion worldwide.

HBO Output Deal (2011)

In May 2011, while serving as Co-Chairman and CEO of Summit Entertainment, Friedman negotiated an exclusive output agreement with HBO. Under this deal, HBO would release Summit's slate of films arriving in theaters from January 2013 through the end of 2017. The agreement made Summit the only mini-major studio to maintain an exclusive output arrangement with HBO at that time.

=== Lionsgate (2012 - 2016) ===
In early 2012, Lionsgate acquired Summit Entertainment in a merger and Friedman joined Lionsgate as Co-Chairman. Following Lionsgate's $412.5 million acquisition of Summit Entertainment in January 2012, Friedman was named Co-Chairman of Lionsgate Motion Picture Group. The appointment was announced in March 2012. The transition involved combining the operations of both studios. Lionsgate reported that since buying Summit, with Friedman at the helm, it grossed more than $1 billion a year at international box offices with hits including the Hunger Games franchise, Divergent, and Now You See Me.

Under Friedman’s leadership, Lionsgate became the first studio outside the traditional majors to generate over $1 billion at the U.S. box office, and did so two years in a row. In Friedman’s final year of leadership at Lionsgate, the studio received the highest number of Academy Award nominations, with 26 in total, including six wins for La La Land and two for Hacksaw Ridge.

=== TMP Entertainment/ Global Road Entertainment (2017 -2018) ===
In 2017, Friedman became Chairman & CEO of TMP Entertainment, the combined company Tang Media Partners formed with IM Global, Open Road Films and IM Global TV. TMP Entertainment merged to become Global Road Entertainment and Friedman became chairman and CEO of the Global Road Entertainment studio. Friedman left in November 2018 and soon after launched Ascendant Entertainment.

=== Ascendant Entertainment (2019 - Present) ===
Friedman is the founder and CEO of Ascendant Entertainment, which focuses on elevated commercial content with broad appeal.

Rules for Vanishing

In November 2019, Friedman's Ascendant Entertainment partnered with Patrick Wachsberger of Picture Perfect Federation to acquire and develop the film and TV rights to Rules for Vanishing, a Young Adult thriller novel by Kate Alice Marshall. The acquisition reunited Friedman and Wachsberger, who had previously worked together at Lionsgate Motion Picture Group, where they launched franchises including Twilight, The Hunger Games, and Divergent.

On the Line

In 2024, Friedman, with Ascendant Entertainment, began developing On the Line, a drama series about female high school basketball. The series was created by former basketball player Melanie Page, with Kellie R. Griffin serving as showrunner. Friedman shared he is “the proud father of four young women and a basketball dad myself.” Regarding the series, he stated, “Our focus is not on the coaches, but on the players — the young women and all the pressure and drama they face in their day-to-day lives, balancing schoolwork, gameplay, and relationships."

The Zone (2025)

In March 2025, Friedman's Ascendant Entertainment announced The Zone, an urban action horror film with a high concept science-fiction twist for 20th Century Studios. The film is directed by Dallas Jackson from a script by David Hayter (X-Men franchise) and Jackson. The project partnered with the film division of Top Dawg Entertainment (TDE), the record label of artists such as Kendrick Lamar and SZA.

Steve Schapiro: Being Everywhere (2025)

At Ascendant, Friedman served as executive producer of Steve Schapiro: Being Everywhere (2025), a documentary directed by Maura Smith about photojournalist Steve Schapiro, alongside fellow executive producers Michael Rosenberg and Sid Ganis. The film was acquired by Abramorama for North American distribution and released theatrically beginning November 14, 2025.

== Honors and awards ==
Friedman was honored with the United Friends of the Children Brass Ring Award in 1999 and 2013. He serves as Vice-Chairman of the Board of United Friends of the Children.

In 2009, Friedman was honored at National Multiple Sclerosis Society’s 35th Annual Dinner of Champions.

In November 2010, Friedman was named the Ernst & Young Entrepreneur Of The Year in the Media, Entertainment and Communications category for his work in creating Summit.

Friedman is a supporter of the Special Olympics movement, having served on the Special Olympics Southern California Board (SOSC) as well as the international Board of Directors for the 2009 Special Olympics World Winter Games. In 2011, Friedman was selected by SOSC as the Honoree at the 15th annual Pier Del Sol. Friedman was a Founding Member of the 2015 Special Olympics World Summer Games Organizing Committee, serving as Chairman of the Board and playing a role in bringing the 2015 World Games to Los Angeles. In 2025, Friedman was honored with the Rafer Johnson Humanitarian Award for his work with the Special Olympics. Friedman currently serves on the SOSC board of directors.

In 2012, Friedman was honored by Saban Free Clinic (Now the Saban Community Clinic). In introducing Friedman, then Warner Bros. distribution president Dan Fellman said Friedman “devotes so much time to helping others.”

In 2013, Friedman was honored with the Publicists' Guild Motion Picture Showman of the Year Award, where he was recognized for 40 years of achievement as a motion picture industry leader.

In 2014, Friedman was honored by International Medical Corps.

Friedman serves on philanthropic boards for UCLA School of Theater, Film & Television, The Curtis School, Saban Community Clinic, and International Medical Corps.

Friedman is on the Board of Directors of the Will Rogers Motion Picture Pioneers Foundation and serves on the Academy of Motion Pictures Arts & Sciences executive committee, having previously served on the Board of Governors of the Academy of Motion Pictures Arts & Sciences.
