= List of entertainer occupations =

An entertainer is someone who provides entertainment in various different forms.

== Types of entertainers ==
- Acrobat
- Actor
- Archimime
- Barker
- Beatboxer
- Benshi
- Bouffon
- Cheerleader
- Circus performer
- Clown
- Club Hostess/Host
- Comedian
- Dancer
- Drag queen
- Drag king
- DJ
- Emcee
- Fashion model
- Flair bartender
- Flatulist
- Geisha
- Geji
- Go-go dancer
- Harlequin
- Illusionist
- Impressionist
- Itinerant poet
- Japanese idol
- Jester
- Kobzar
- Korean Idol
- Lirnyk
- Magician
- Master of ceremonies
- Mime
- Minstrel
- Monologist
- Musician
- Party princess
- Podcaster
- Professional wrestler
- Promotional model
- Radio personality
- Rapper
- Rhapsode
- Ring girl
- Ringmaster
- Scop
- Shamakhi dancers
- Showgirl
- Showman
- Showrunner
- Singer
- Skomorokh
- Social media personality
- Streamer
- Street performer
- Strongman
- Stunt performer
- Television presenter
- Theatre practitioner
- TikToker
- Vedette
- YouTuber
