= Christmas at the Kringles =

2026 film directed by Kevin Lewis

- Theatrical release poster
- Directed by: Kevin Lewis
- Written by: Zack Imbrogno
- Produced by: Tom Ortenberg; Andrew Ortenberg; Kevin Lewis; Liam Finn; Jordan Dykstra
- Starring: Ron Livingston; Rachel Bilson; Rob Riggle; Arden Myrin; Beverly D'Angelo; David Wain; Donald Faison; Thomas Lennon
- Cinematography: Brandon Cox
- Edited by: Ryan Liebert
- Music by: Émoi
- Production companies: 19th Hole Productions; Astria Studios
- Distributed by: Briarcliff Entertainment
- Release dates: October 15, 2026 (Screamfest); October 30, 2026
- Running time: 99 minutes
- Country: United States
- Language: English
- Budget: $2 million
- Box office: $1 million

Christmas at the Kringles is a 2026 American action comedy horror film directed by Kevin Lewis and written by Zack Imbrogno. It stars Ron Livingston, Rachel Bilson, Rob Riggle, Arden Myrin, Beverly D'Angelo, David Wain, Donald Faison, and Thomas Lennon. It tells the story of a family who meets their next door neighbors that want to make sure everyone celebrates Christmas every day as the patriarch joins forces with an alcoholic Mall Santa to thwart them.

The film was released in the United States by Briarcliff Entertainment on October 30, 2026. It received negative reviews from critics.

== Plot ==
The Severson family move into a suburban North Carolina neighborhood and soon becomes unsettled by their next-door neighbors the Kringles, who celebrate Christmas throughout the year. As their young son grows increasingly drawn to the neighboring household, the parents grow suspicious. When Mark Severson confronts the situation, he learns that the neighbors are part of a dangerous cult with plans to force the family into their way of life. He is forced to join forces with a rogue alcoholic Mall Santa in order to free his family.

== Cast ==
- Ron Livingston as Mark Severson, the workaholic patriarch of the Severson family
- Rachel Bilson as Julie Severson, the wife of Mark
- Rob Riggle as Drunk Santa, an unnamed alcoholic Mall Santa who helps Mark
- Thomas Lennon as Nick Kringle, the patriarch of the Kringle family
- Arden Myrin as Carol Kringle, the wife of Nick
- Donald Faison as Daryl, the Severson's man-child neighbor
- Beverly D'Angelo as Mama K Kringle, the mother of Nick
- David Wain as Noel Tannebaum, the head of the Christmas-liking cult that the Kringles are a part of
- Alexis Kemp as Merry Kringle, the daughter of Nick and Carol
- Zeke Jones as Rudolph Kringle, the son of Nick and Carol
- Rhino Michaels as Jingles, a Christmas gimp who serves as Nick and Carol's enforcer

== Production ==
The film was directed by Kevin Lewis from a screenplay by Zack Imbrogno. Principal photography took place in Los Angeles. The film was produced by Andrew Ortenberg, Tom Ortenberg, Liam Finn, Kevin Lewis, and Jordan Dykstra under 19th Hole Productions and Astria Studios. Brandon Cox served as cinematographer, Ryan Liebert as editor, and Émoi composed the score.

In May 2026, Briarcliff Entertainment acquired U.S. distribution rights. The film received an R rating from the Motion Picture Association for some strong bloody violence, language, and some sexual material.

== Release ==
The film had its world premiere as the closing-night film of the 26th Screamfest Horror Film Festival on October 15, 2026. Briarcliff Entertainment released the film theatrically in the United States on October 30, 2026.

== Reception ==
On the review aggregator website Rotten Tomatoes, 3% of 33 critics' reviews are positive, with an average rating of 3/10. The website's consensus reads: "A visually grating, incoherent attempt at holiday horror comedy, Christmas at the Kringles offers weak laughs and even weaker scares." Metacritic, which uses a weighted average, assigned the film a score of 21 out of 100, based on five critics, indicating "generally unfavorable" reviews.

Derek Smith of Slant Magazine panned the film, criticizing its humor and subpar writing, considered the plot haphazard, writing it off as "neither amusing nor scary".
