= Good Luck, Have Fun, Don't Die =

2026 film by Gore Verbinski

- Theatrical release poster
- Directed by: Gore Verbinski
- Written by: Matthew Robinson
- Produced by: Gore Verbinski; Robert Kulzer; Erwin Stoff; Oly Obst; Denise Chamian
- Starring: Sam Rockwell; Juno Temple; Asim Chaudhry; Michael Peña; Zazie Beetz; Haley Lu Richardson; Tom Taylor
- Cinematography: James Whitaker
- Edited by: Craig Wood
- Music by: Geoff Zanelli
- Production companies: Constantin Film; Blind Wink Productions; 3 Arts Entertainment
- Distributed by: Briarcliff Entertainment (United States); Constantin Film (Germany)
- Release dates: September 24, 2025 (Fantastic Fest); February 13, 2026 (United States)
- Running time: 134 minutes
- Countries: United States; Germany
- Language: English
- Budget: $20 million
- Box office: $10 million

Good Luck, Have Fun, Don't Die is a 2025 science fiction comedy film directed by Gore Verbinski and written by Matthew Robinson. The film stars Sam Rockwell, Juno Temple, Asim Chaudhry, Michael Peña, Zazie Beetz, Haley Lu Richardson, and Tom Taylor. It follows a man from the future who travels to the past to recruit patrons of a Los Angeles diner to help combat a rogue artificial intelligence. Good Luck, Have Fun, Don't Die premiered at the 2025 Fantastic Fest and was released in the United States on February 13, 2026, by Briarcliff Entertainment. The film grossed $9.7 million worldwide against a budget of $20 million.

== Plot ==
A disheveled man arrives at a Norms diner in Los Angeles and claims to have traveled from the future, where artificial superintelligence has destroyed humanity. An unknown combination of people from the diner can prevent the AI's creation; through trial-and-error, this is the man's 117th attempt. Announcing that he has a bomb, he enlists diners Susan, Scott, Mark, Janet, Bob, Marie, and initially rejects Ingrid before changing his mind.

Mark and Janet are teachers who were attacked by students that are hypnotized by their phones, but escape using a colleague's homemade "jammer". Susan had her son cloned after he was killed in an increasingly common school shooting; distressed by the clone's unnatural behavior and built in corporate advertising, Susan is introduced to a more lifelike AI deadbot of her son, which tells her to follow the man in the diner. Ingrid, a party princess performer with an allergy to electronics, loses her partner when he decides to live permanently in a virtual reality.

Police surround the diner and Bob, convinced by the man to act as a decoy, is fatally shot, while Susan alerts the group to a hidden tunnel. They escape and the man explains that a nine-year-old boy living nearby is building an artificial intelligence that will trigger the catastrophic technological singularity. As the rise of AI is inevitable in any timeline, the apocalypse can be prevented by installing safety protocols before the AI gains sentience. The man reveals that the device strapped to his body is not a bomb, but his time machine, and that he has a countdown of time remaining before the AI is created.

The group is pursued by two masked gunmen; one is killed but shoots Marie dead beforehand. As the group arm themselves at a neighboring house, the man explains that a random enemy will soon arrive; prior attempts have ranged from trained mercenaries to a million rats, and the others suggest they could face kittens, a centaur, or a single Pug. The man tells them about the apocalyptic future caused by humanity's addiction to technology; his mother raised him in hiding from rogue AI, but he left their bunker in hopes of seeing a sunrise, leading her to be killed by an AI drone.

Phone-enslaved teenagers attack the house, and Janet and Mark hold them off with the jammers as the others escape, and the teenagers soon flee from a giant centaur made of kittens. The remaining gunman arrives and reveals he was anonymously hired to kill the group, before Scott runs him over. They are invited into the boy's home, but his "father" kills Scott with a cooking thermometer and is shot dead by the man, while the "mother" confesses she was paid to play the part.

The survivors find the boy in a hidden room, typing code atop a pile of technological waste. Susan recognizes him as a clone, but she and the man are captured by robotic toys, which stab the man in the chest. As his countdown device nears zero, Ingrid fights through her allergy and a cyclone of cables, and the boy confronts her in a virtual reality. He reveals that the man from the future is her son, but she rejects the AI, inserting the safety protocol and seemingly completing the mission.

As the survivors celebrate, the man senses something is wrong and detonates his device, disappearing to the future as Ingrid realizes the AI has tricked them. She tries to warn the others as she is taken away by ambulance, and sees the boy with a pug telling her "good luck, have fun, don't die." Returning to Norms in the past, the man explains to a confused Ingrid that his new goal is to use rats to infect the entire world with her allergy, and she smiles tentatively as he begins his 118th speech to recruit her fellow diners to his cause.

== Cast ==
- Sam Rockwell as the Man From the Future.
- Juno Temple as Susan, a grieving mother.
- Asim Chaudhry as Scott, an Uber driver
- Michael Peña as Mark, a substitute teacher.
- Zazie Beetz as Janet, a teacher.
- Daniel Barnett as Bob, a Boy Scout leader.
- Georgia Goodman as Marie.
- Haley Lu Richardson as Ingrid, a party princess.
- Tom Taylor as Tim, Ingrid's boyfriend.
- Artie Wilkinson-Hunt as the AI.
- Dominique Maher as Samantha.
- Anna Acton as Jillian.
- Adam Burton as Dale, the shop teacher.
- Riccardo Drayton as Darren, Susan's son.
- Dino Fetscher as Blaise.

== Production ==
=== Development ===
Screenwriter Matthew Robinson had initially written a script for a television pilot titled Don't Trust Anyone Under 30 centered on a literary major and his attempts to connect with other students over books. After determining there was not enough material to the concept to sustain an ongoing television series, Robinson instead shifted the focus to a man from the future and added more vignettes. The script went through a series of development sessions at 3 Arts Entertainment until it eventually morphed into a feature film project. Ongoing developments in artificial intelligence led to the producers attempting to jumpstart the film as it was felt the project would lose cultural relevance if they moved too late.

It was announced in February 2024 that Gore Verbinski was set to direct the film, with Sam Rockwell, Haley Lu Richardson, Michael Peña, Zazie Beetz and Juno Temple cast to star.

Producer Erwin Stoff pitched the project to Verbinski after several other candidates ended up not working out and according to Stoff responded with fervent enthusiasm which helped the project take off. Following Verbinski's frequent collaborator, producer Denise Chamian, joining the project, they were able to secure the cast beginning with Rockwell which in turn led to Constantin Film bankrolling the film's entire $20 million budget.

=== Filming ===
Principal photography began in April 2024 in Cape Town. The school scenes were filmed at Edgemead High School in the suburb of Edgemead.

=== Music ===
In September 2025, it was announced that Geoff Zanelli would compose the film's score. This is the first Verbinski-directed film with Zanelli as the primary composer; he had earlier provided additional music for Verbinski's Pirates of the Caribbean films and The Lone Ranger (2013).

== Release ==
The film had its world premiere at Fantastic Fest on September 28, 2025, followed by a Q&A session with Verbinski, and was released in the United States by Briarcliff Entertainment on February 13, 2026.

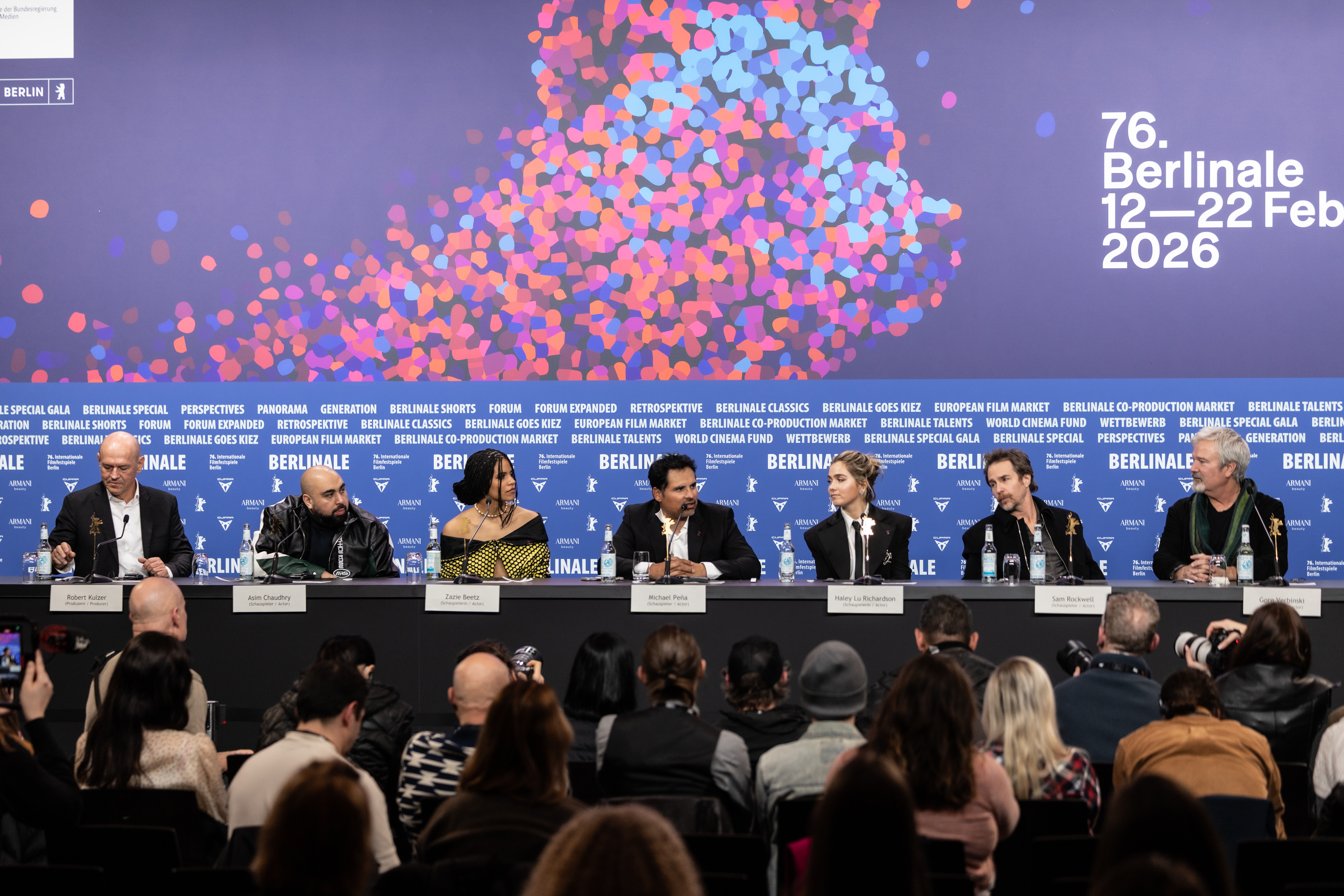
Director Gore Verbinski, cast members Sam Rockwell, Haley Lu Richardson, Zazie Beetz, Michael Peña and Asim Chaudhry, and producer Robert Kulzer at the 2026 Berlin International Film Festival

It had its European premiere as a Special Gala screening at the 76th Berlin International Film Festival (Berlinale) in February 2026.

== Reception ==
Metacritic, which uses a weighted average, assigned the film a score of 66 out of 100, based on 32 critics, indicating "generally favorable" reviews. Audiences polled by CinemaScore gave the film an average grade of "B" on an A+ to F scale. On the review aggregator website Rotten Tomatoes, 81% of 232 critics' reviews are positive, with an average rating of 7.1/10. The website's consensus reads: "A gleeful high-concept comedy with a serious message at its core, Good Luck, Have Fun, Don't Die lets Sam Rockwell rip with thrilling results while marking a very welcome return of director Gore Verbinski to peak form."

Peter Debruge of Variety called the film "an unapologetically irreverent, wildly inventive, end-is-nigh take on the time-loop movie", and stated that "It takes a virtuoso of [Verbinski's] caliber to execute on the movie's intricate Everything Everywhere All at Once-level imagination, even if the gonzo idea man here is actually [screenwriter] Robinson." Tim Grierson of ScreenDaily.com refers to the Robinson and Verbinsky work as a "glib" and "gonzo AI satire", noting that the film "diagnoses an important societal ill" and that "Verbinski’s visual acumen makes the most of th[e] colourful, bloody romp", but that it fails to develop its characters, instead using them to "mock our [phone] obsession... and... people’s inability to interact with the real world", concluding that the film "doesn’t have enough of a human element".

Stephen A. Russell of Time Out criticized the film's screenplay for its leaden exposition and over-explained dialogue, saying it "may have been churned out by AI itself" and was written for an audience "watching it with one eye on our phones". While he acknowledged that this was "on brand" for a film about a "mind-numbing cyber intelligence", he stated that it made for "a boring two-and-a-bit hours". Esther Rosenfield of Little White Lies compared the film unfavorably to the television series Black Mirror, criticizing its "painfully obvious satirical broadsides at modern technology."

The British Board of Film Classification has designated the film as suitable for individuals of age 15 years and older.

== See also ==
- List of films featuring time loops

== Works cited ==
- Constantin Staff (July 25, 2026). "Cinema: Good Luck, Have Fun, Don't Die" (production company film page). Constantin Films (Constantin.film).
