= Honest Thief =

2020 film directed by Mark Williams

- Theatrical release poster
- Directed by: Mark Williams
- Written by: Steve Allrich; Mark Williams
- Produced by: Mark Williams; Myles Nestel; Tai Duncan; Craig Chapman
- Starring: Liam Neeson; Kate Walsh; Robert Patrick; Anthony Ramos; Jeffrey Donovan; Jai Courtney
- Cinematography: Shelly Johnson
- Edited by: Michael Shawver
- Music by: Mark Isham
- Production companies: The Solution Entertainment Group; Zero Gravity Management; Samuel Marshall Films; Ingenious Media
- Distributed by: Open Road Films; Briarcliff Entertainment
- Release date: October 16, 2020
- Running time: 99 minutes
- Country: United States
- Language: English
- Budget: $30 million
- Box office: $32.6 million

Honest Thief is a 2020 American action thriller film directed by Mark Williams, from a screenplay by Williams and Steve Allrich. The film stars Liam Neeson, Kate Walsh, Jai Courtney, Jeffrey Donovan, Anthony Ramos and Robert Patrick, and follows a former bank robber (Neeson) who decides to turn himself in to the FBI, only to be set up by corrupt agents.

Honest Thief was theatrically released, including in IMAX, in the United States on October 16, 2020, by Open Road Films and Briarcliff Entertainment. The film received mixed reviews from critics, who praised Neeson's performance, but noted the film's familiarity.

== Plot ==
Tom Dolan is a former US Marine demolitions expert. After years of service, Tom decides to use his knowledge and skills to become a bank robber. He successfully robs a string of banks, and becomes known to the public as the "In-and-Out Bandit". One day, while he is storing stolen money in a storage unit, he meets Annie Wilkins, a psychology graduate student employed by the storage facility. Unaware that the money is stolen, Annie helps him store the money, and the two of them hit it off and are soon inseparable.

A year later, Tom, wanting to live a life with Annie without the guilt of his past, calls the FBI and offers to surrender himself and the ill-gotten money to the government in exchange for a much more lenient sentence. FBI special agent Sam Baker agrees to meet with him the next day. However, tied up with other business, Baker assigns the case to lower-ranking agents John Nivens and Ramon Hall.

Nivens and Hall meet with Tom to take his statement, and Tom reveals the location of the stolen money, in the storage unit he had rented. The agents visit the storage unit, realize he was telling the truth, and decide to keep the money for themselves. They go back to the hotel to kill off Tom, but Tom reveals that they only have three million dollars, not nine. At this point, Agent Baker arrives at Tom’s hotel room. Nivens shoots and kills Baker with a 9mm, then points the gun at Tom, who charges at him. Tom and Nivens fall through the hotel window and land in front of Annie, who is on her way to visit Tom.

Tom and Annie drive away; Nivens and Hall keep shooting at them, and they barely escape safely. Tom then confesses to Annie that he had turned to bank robbery as revenge for his father's CEO's unfair treatment of him. (Tom’s father had become depressed after the death of Tom’s mother, and had later committed suicide.) Tom explains that once he’d started robbing banks he kept doing it because it was exhilarating. He advises Annie to board a bus to keep herself safe, which she does. However, unbeknownst to Tom, Annie gets off the bus near Tom’s storage unit, planning to pick up the storage unit's security-footage card. While she is at the storage unit, Nivens and Hall arrive; they too have come to pick up the security-footage card, to cover their tracks. Nivens knocks Annie unconscious and he and Hall leave. Tom soon finds her and rushes her to the hospital. When Baker's partner, Sean Meyers, attempts to arrest Tom, Tom explains everything and then escapes, managing to evade capture by Meyers. Driven by angst and suspicion, Meyers begins to notice discrepancies in Nivens' story.

Tom goes to Hall’s home, ambushes him there, gets him to reveal the location of the safe house, and gets the security-footage card from him. Hall warns Tom to get Annie out of the hospital before Nivens kills her, which he does. Tom then asks Annie for her help in getting the security-footage card to Meyers. Meanwhile, Nivens barely escapes a bomb planted to destroy his home, and makes his way to the safe house, expecting to find Hall there alone. To his surprise, Tom is also waiting for him there. When Nivens learns that Tom had already gotten the security-footage card from Hall and had arranged for it to be turned in to Meyers, he flies into a rage and murders Hall. Tom struggles with Nivens and is wounded, but manages to fight him off. Nivens takes the money and gets into his car to drive away. But Tom calls Nivens and tells him he can’t leave his car because there is a pressure-sensitive IED under his car seat. Nivens is forced to call the bomb squad and wait for them in his car. Meyers quickly arrives to apprehend Nivens; his car is searched; the stolen money is recovered; and it’s revealed that the IED is a dud.

Annie gives Meyers the rest of the stolen money (hidden in another storage unit) as well as Hall’s voice recording of Tom's confrontation with Nivens, in which Nivens admits to murdering both Baker and Hall.

Knowing that he must take responsibility for the bank robberies and for stealing the nine million dollars, Tom confesses and turns himself in. Meyers recognizes Tom’s integrity, admires his dedication, and gives him credit for exposing Nivens' illegal activities. He promises that he will do what he can to lessen Tom’s sentence, and muses that, under different circumstances, Tom would have made a terrific FBI agent.

== Cast ==
- Liam Neeson as Tom Dolan, the aging "In-and-Out Bandit".
- Kate Walsh as Annie Wilkins, Tom's love interest.
- Jai Courtney as Agent John Nivens, a corrupt FBI agent.
- Jeffrey Donovan as Agent Sean Meyers, FBI agent and Baker's partner.
- Anthony Ramos as Agent Ramon Hall, an FBI agent and John's partner.
- Robert Patrick as Agent Sam Baker, FBI agent
- Jasmine Cephas Jones as Beth Hall, Agent Hall's wife.

== Production ==
On October 12, 2018, it was announced that Liam Neeson and Kate Walsh would star in the thriller film Honest Thief, as bank robber Tom and his love interest Annie, respectively, with Mark Williams directing. Jai Courtney and Jeffrey Donovan were also in talks for roles, with Tai Duncan, Myles Nestel, Williams, and Craig Chapman producing the film. Courtney and Donovan were later confirmed along with Anthony Ramos, and Robert Patrick added to the cast in November, with filming set to begin on November 5. The film was set in Boston, and shot in and around Worcester, Massachusetts.

== Release ==
In January 2020, Briarcliff Entertainment acquired distribution rights to the film and set it for a September 4, 2020 release. It was then rescheduled to be released on October 9, 2020. In June 2020, it was announced Open Road Films would co-distribute the film with Briarcliff. After temporarily being pulled from the schedule due to the COVID-19 pandemic, the film's ultimate U.S. release date was October 16, 2020. Due to the lack of big-budget competition, the film also played in IMAX and Dolby theaters.

== Reception ==
=== Box office ===
Honest Thief grossed $14.2 million in the United States and Canada, and $18.4 million in other territories, for a worldwide total of $32.6 million.

In the United States, the film grossed $1.3 million from 2,425 theaters on its first day, including $225,000 from Thursday night preview screenings. It went on to debut to $3.6 million, or $4.1 million including Canada's opening weekend the previous week, topping the box office. In its second weekend the film made $2.4 million, remaining in first, before being dethroned by newcomer Come Play in its third weekend.

=== Critical response ===
On review aggregator Rotten Tomatoes, Honest Thief holds an approval rating of 41% based on 111 reviews, with an average score of 5/10. The website's critics consensus reads, "Guilty of first-degree squandering, Honest Thief returns Liam Neeson to late-period action thriller mode but neglects to supply much of a story." On Metacritic, it has a weighted average score of 46 out of 100, based on 21 critics, indicating "mixed or average" reviews. According to PostTrak, 75% of audience members gave the film a positive score, with 53% saying they would definitely recommend it.

Owen Gleiberman of Variety complimented Neeson for not phoning in his performance, but added, "Honest Thief isn't incompetent (for a certain kind of pulp action fan, it delivers just enough of the goods), but it's a textbook case of an action movie that goes through the motions." Frank Scheck for The Hollywood Reporter said the film "delivers exactly what you expect" and wrote, "Running a sleek 90 minutes before the credits roll, Honest Thief is certainly efficient if not exactly original, with writer/director Williams infusing it with enough quirky character touches — such as Tom crankily complaining how much he hates his 'In and Out Bandit' moniker — to distract from the derivative feeling of it all."
