= The Apprentice (2024 film) =

2024 film by Ali Abbasi

- Theatrical release poster
- Directed by: Ali Abbasi
- Written by: Gabriel Sherman
- Produced by: Ali Abbasi; Louis Tisné; Ruth Treacy; Julianne Forde; Jacob Jarek; Daniel Bekerman
- Starring: Sebastian Stan; Jeremy Strong; Martin Donovan; Maria Bakalova
- Cinematography: Kasper Tuxen
- Edited by: Olivier Bugge Coutté; Olivia Neergaard-Holm
- Music by: Martin Dirkov
- Production companies: Scythia Films; Profile Pictures; Tailored Films
- Distributed by: Mongrel Media (Canada); StudioCanal (Ireland); Nordisk Film (Denmark); Rich Spirit; Briarcliff Entertainment (United States)
- Release dates: May 20, 2024 (Cannes); October 11, 2024 (Canada and United States); October 17, 2024 (Denmark); October 18, 2024 (Ireland)
- Running time: 122 minutes
- Countries: Canada; Denmark; Ireland; United States
- Language: English
- Budget: $16 million
- Box office: $17.3 million

The Apprentice is a 2024 biographical drama film, directed by Ali Abbasi and written by Gabriel Sherman. It stars Sebastian Stan as Donald Trump and examines his career as a real estate businessman in New York City in the 1970s and 1980s, highlighting his relationship with attorney Roy Cohn, played by Jeremy Strong. The cast also includes Martin Donovan as Trump's father Fred, and Maria Bakalova as Trump's first wife, Ivana.

An international co-production between Canada, Denmark, Ireland, and the United States, the biopic was announced in May 2018, but languished until Abbasi, Stan, and Strong joined in 2023. It premiered at the 77th Cannes Film Festival on May 20, 2024, and impressed critics, sparking an eight-minute standing ovation, and "feverish media attention". However, the film struggled to find American distribution due to its subject matter and an attempt by Trump's legal team to block its release. Briarcliff Entertainment eventually bought the rights, and theatrically released it on October 11, 2024. The film underperformed at the box office, grossing $17 million worldwide on a $16 million budget.

The film received praise from critics for its acting, directing, and editing; Trump himself, meanwhile, described it as a "defamatory, politically disgusting hatchet job" intended to harm his ultimately successful 2024 presidential campaign. For their performances, Stan and Strong each received wide acclaim and recognition, including respective nominations for Best Actor and Best Supporting Actor at the 97th Academy Awards.

== Plot ==
In 1973, the young Donald Trump, after pointing out various wealthy people to his date, meets Roy Cohn, notorious at the time as former chief counsel to Joseph McCarthy, at a New York City social club. Trump complains that the federal government is investigating his real-estate mogul father, Fred Trump, for discrimination against African-American tenants; Cohn offers to help.

After Cohn blackmails the lead prosecutor with photos of him with a cabana boy, the prosecutor settles the case for little, despite evidence of racial discrimination. Trump eventually descends further into Cohn's orbit, seeing him as a better mentor than his father. Cohn teaches Trump about dressing well and media relations, and offers his "three rules": always attack, never admit wrongdoing, and always claim victory, even if defeated. Trump attends a decadent Cohn party, where he walks in on Cohn (whose homosexuality is an open secret) having an orgy.

Trump wants to develop the derelict midtown Commodore Hotel, near Grand Central Terminal, into a Hyatt. Cohn, using blackmail audiotapes of officials, helps Trump obtain a $160 million tax abatement for the project, outraging advocates for the poor. Trump does not ask Fred, with whom he has a tense relationship, for permission to build.

Trump develops the luxurious Trump Tower, belittling Fred's smaller achievements, and the media begins to treat him as a successful mogul. Cohn criticizes unions and welfare queens, presenting himself as a guardian of the American spirit, while attacking rules, morals, and truth. Against Cohn's advice, Trump proceeds with some real estate developments, such as the Trump Taj Mahal in Atlantic City, causing losses. During the Reagan era, Trump says the United States needs to be stronger instead of disrespected by foreign nations. Trump and Roger Stone approve of one of Reagan's slogans, "Let's Make America Great Again".

Fred is ashamed of his eldest son, Fred Jr., for becoming an airline pilot with TWA, considering it akin to being "a bus driver with wings". Fred Jr. spirals into alcoholism, derailing his career, while the Trump family distances themselves from his self-destruction, and he eventually dies, devastating the family. His mother, Mary Anne, is agonized by this, and by Donald's attempts to manipulate his father's dementia to gain control of his siblings' inheritance to pay off mounting debts.

Trump meets Czech model Ivana Zelníčková, gets her admitted to his club after she is turned away, pays for her expenses, then pursues her to Aspen, Colorado, to ask her on a date. They eventually wed. She becomes an influential figure in the success of The Trump Organization. However, Trump grows resentful of Ivana overshadowing his fame and tells her he is no longer attracted to her (though not mentioning his various affairs). She complains of her breast enlargement he requested and calls him fat and bald, so he rapes her. Now addicted to amphetamines to help control his weight, Donald is discouraged from using them by his doctor, with whom he discusses his obesity and baldness. Trump has contentious relations with the new mayor, Ed Koch.

While facing disbarment, Cohn develops AIDS but publicly denies it. His lover Russell also develops AIDS, and Cohn asks Trump to put Russell up at the Hyatt. Trump eventually evicts Russell, claiming that guests complained, and refuses to approach Cohn, who berates Trump on the street, calling him an ungrateful fraud. After Russell dies, Trump takes Cohn to Mar-a-Lago in Florida and celebrates his birthday. He gives Cohn Trump-branded diamond cufflinks, but Ivana informs Cohn during dinner that the diamonds are zirconia knockoffs. When the cake arrives, Cohn weeps and excuses himself from the table.

Cohn dies in 1986. Trump undergoes liposuction and scalp-reduction surgeries. He meets with Tony Schwartz, the ghostwriter of his autobiography, The Art of the Deal, and appropriates Cohn's three rules as his own. Trump muses about becoming President of the United States, talks about the genetic superiority of winners, and expatiates his greatness while looking out toward an American flag waving against the backdrop of the New York skyline.

== Cast ==
- Sebastian Stan as Donald Trump
- Jeremy Strong as Roy Cohn
- Martin Donovan as Fred Trump Sr.
- Maria Bakalova as Ivana Trump
- Catherine McNally as Mary Anne Trump
- Charlie Carrick as Fred Trump Jr.
- Ben Sullivan as Russell Eldridge
- Mark Rendall as Roger Stone
- Joe Pingue as Anthony Salerno
- Stuart Hughes as Mike Wallace
- Bruce Beaton as Andy Warhol
- Ian D. Clark as Ed Koch
- Jason Blicker as George Steinbrenner
- Tom Barnett as Rupert Murdoch
- Eoin Duffy as Tony Schwartz

== Production ==
=== Development ===
The film was first announced in May 2018. Gabriel Sherman, who had covered Donald Trump's 2016 presidential campaign as a journalist, was announced to be writing the screenplay. Sherman wanted to tell Trump's "origin story" after speaking about the relationship between Trump and Roy Cohn with "people who had worked for Trump since the '80s". During these conversations, Sherman learned about how Cohn had mentored Trump, who during his 2016 campaign, employed "strategies" that had been taught to him by Cohn. In that same year, Sherman finished writing a draft of the film. He and producer Amy Baer wanted to collaborate with a non-American director for the film since he wanted to combine his "insider" perspective with an "outsider point of view." After producer Guymon Casady recommended Sherman watch director Ali Abbasi's film Border (2018), he decided to collaborate with Abbasi for the project. By October 2023, Abbasi was confirmed to be joining the film as director and, as initially reported, co-writer.

In September 2024, after financier Kinematics, backed by Trump supporter Dan Snyder, exited The Apprentice due to creative differences, independent production and distribution company Rich Spirit, founded by James Shani, stepped in to fill the financial gap. Initially an early investor with a $500,000 contribution, Shani acquired Kinematics' stake and secured additional private investment to support the film's release. This acquisition occurred when other studios were hesitant to distribute the film, fearing potential retaliation from Donald Trump. Steven Cheung, Trump's then-chief campaign spokesperson said: "We will be filing a lawsuit to address the blatantly false assertions from these pretend filmmakers," he added "This 'film' is pure malicious defamation, should not see the light of day".

Rich Spirit expanded into distribution through this acquisition, partnering with Briarcliff Entertainment for The Apprentice's domestic release on October 11, 2024. The company is focused on independent films, genre cinema, and international productions, with an emphasis on bold, original storytelling and grassroots marketing strategies. Shani, a USC alumnus, previously worked in music videos and commercial production before moving into film financing and distribution. In collaboration with Briarcliff CEO Tom Ortenberg, Shani launched an awards campaign for The Apprentice, targeting multiple Academy Award categories, including Best Director (Ali Abbasi) and acting nominations for Sebastian Stan and Jeremy Strong. Rich Spirit also planned an extended marketing strategy through 2025, featuring university screenings and community activations.

=== Writing ===
However, it was later confirmed that Sherman would be the film's sole writer. According to Abbasi, producers had shared the script with multiple filmmakers, including Paul Thomas Anderson and Clint Eastwood, who had turned down the offer to direct, seeing the film as a "business risk".

In October 2024, Abbasi described the film as "a movie about a human being". He emphasized that it was not intended to be a film solely revolving around Donald Trump, but an exploration of the American political system. Abbasi compared Roy Cohn's mentorship of Donald Trump to that of Frankenstein (1818). Sherman also opined that the script functions as a standalone dramatic story of "a master teaching an apprentice, and the apprentice outstripping the master" and emphasized that although the film is based on "rigorous" research and real-world events, he ultimately wrote it as a "work of art." He specifically enumerated a scene in which Trump's mother read a newspaper article comparing him to Robert Redford as not being fictitious and based on a real article written by The New York Times. Strong characterized it as "a humanistic interrogation and investigation of these people. Ali is not making The Great Dictator — it's not a farce, it's not a cartoon. We're trying to hold a mirror up to this world and these individuals and try to understand how we got here".

The success of The Apprentice positioned Rich Spirit as an emerging boutique studio, aiming to acquire and distribute three to four films per year, prioritizing projects that resonate with younger and international audiences. The company has since engaged in discussions for future acquisitions, including a potential partnership on another Briarcliff release.

=== Casting ===
In 2022, Sebastian Stan signed on to play Trump. To prepare for the role during pre-production, Stan listened to tapes of a younger Trump's voice as he did daily tasks, even practicing how his mouth moves, having a talent for imitating people since childhood. In addition to this, Stan thought about how he was told about the American Dream when, after moving from Romania to the United States, his mother took him to see New York City's skyscrapers. In anticipation of filming, Stan consumed peanut butter and jelly sandwiches and Coca-Colas to gain weight. When the film got temporarily suspended, he started bulking up in order to reprise his role as Bucky Barnes in the Marvel Cinematic Universe (MCU) film Thunderbolts*, but had to frustratingly reverse course when that Marvel Studios production got suspended as well due to the 2023 Writers Guild of America and SAG-AFTRA strikes. In November 2023, Stan, Strong and Bakalova were announced as the lead roles. In February 2024, it was announced that Martin Donovan had joined the cast portraying Fred Trump. The film is a joint production of Canada, Denmark, Ireland and the United States.

=== Filming ===
Principal photography on The Apprentice began in November 2023 in Toronto with a small crew. The film was shot across 50 locations over the course of 30 days. Kasper Tuxen served as director of photography. Heavily infuenced by the Dogme 95 movement, Tuxen oriented his approach to cinematography on The Apprentice around shooting a period film with limited resources. As the film was being shot in contemporary Toronto, rather than try to recreate 1970s Wall Street with period-appropriate sets and props like cars, Tuxen instead put a long lens on the camera for a shallow depth of field. Scenes taking place in the 1970s emulate the grain and texture of 16mm news cameras of the time with scenes in the following decade shifting aesthetically to reflect the aesthetic changes of TV news coverage surrounding Trump and the film's themetic arc of moral disintegration. Although he tested various vintage formats, Tuxen ultimately opted to shoot The Apprentice with the Arri Alexa 35 digital camera. A small part of the camera sensor was used so that it could be paired with a 16mm lens. After establishing the two aesthetics of grain and broadcast video, and using only one camera to shoot the film, Tuxen felt a sense of freedom. Filming wrapped on January 28, 2024.

== Release ==
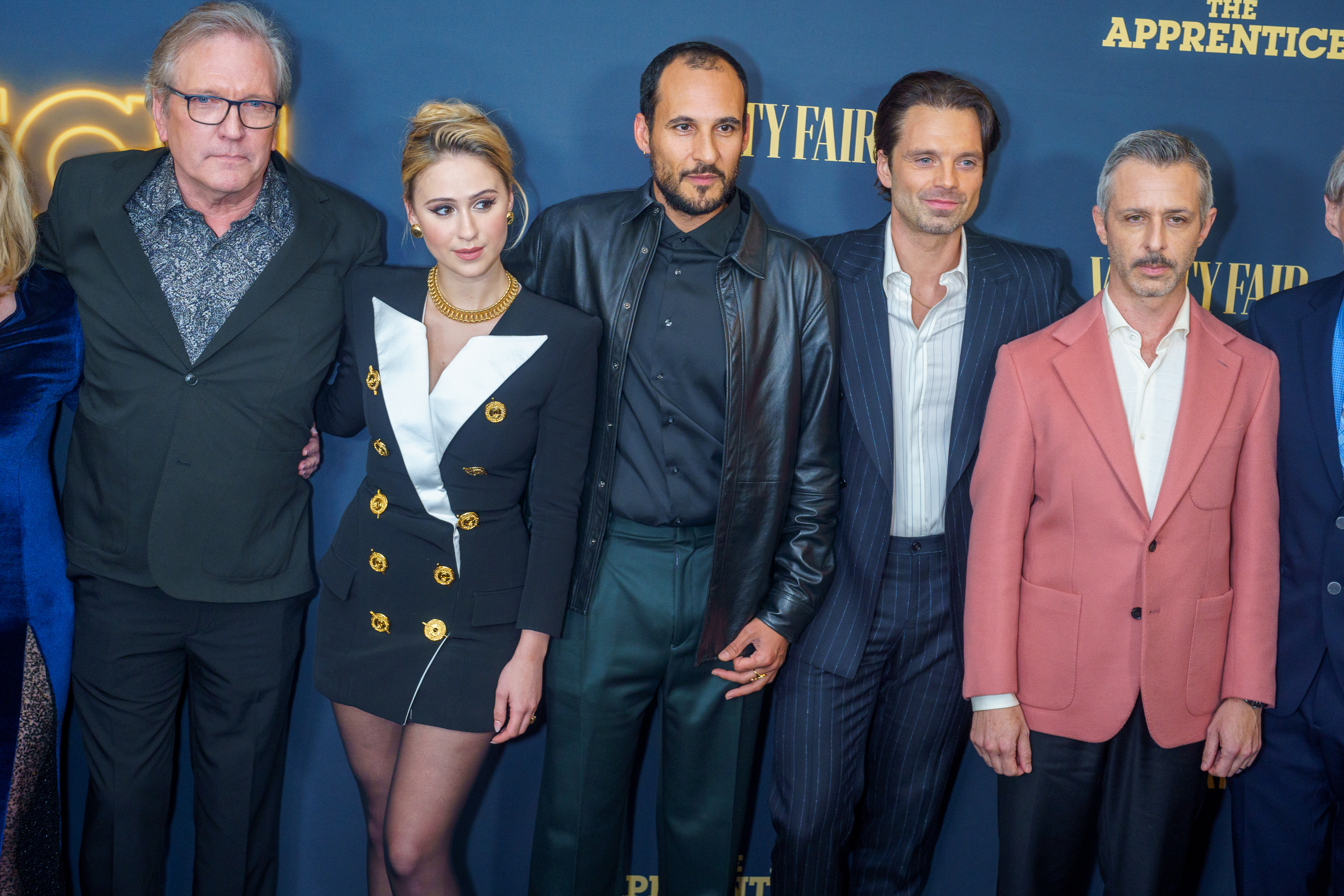
Left to right: Martin Donovan, Maria Bakalova, Ali Abbasi, Sebastian Stan, and Jeremy Strong at the film's New York premiere.

The Apprentice was submitted at the 2024 Cannes Film Festival, held from May 14 to 25, 2024. It was included in competition for the Palme d'Or in April 2024, alongside 18 other films, and had its world premiere on May 20, 2024, at the festival. It also screened at the 51st Telluride Film Festival on August 31, 2024, and the 2024 BFI London Film Festival on October 15, 2024.

Following the departure of financier Kinematics, Rich Spirit, an independent production and distribution company founded by James Shani, stepped in to provide additional financing for the film and supported its domestic release. Initially an early investor, Shani acquired a majority stake in the project and partnered with Briarcliff Entertainment to ensure its theatrical distribution.

StudioCanal acquired British and Irish distribution rights to the film prior to its world premiere at Cannes. In June 2024, after much difficulty in finding a domestic distributor over concerns regarding its content as well as an attempt by Trump's legal team to block its release, Tom Ortenberg's Briarcliff Entertainment was reported to be close to acquiring American distribution rights for a fall 2024 release, a deal that was confirmed in August 2024. The film was distributed in Australia by Madman Films.

On September 3, 2024, a crowdfunding campaign on Kickstarter was launched to help prolong the film's theatrical release in the US, with rewards including props worn in the film and VIP tickets to attend the film's premiere in New York City. The first trailer for the film was released on September 10, 2024, coinciding with the presidential debate between Trump and Kamala Harris.

The Apprentice was released theatrically in Australia on October 10, 2024, and in the US on October 11, with limited marketing costs (including no TV spots). The film was released on premium video on demand (PVOD) on November 1, 2024. Following its 97th Academy Awards nominations, Briarcliff announced a re-release in theaters beginning on January 31, 2025.

== Reception ==
=== Box office ===
The Apprentice grossed $4 million in the United States and Canada, and $13.3 million in other territories, for a worldwide total of $17.3 million.

In the United States and Canada, The Apprentice was released alongside Terrifier 3, Piece by Piece, My Hero Academia: You're Next, and the wide expansion of Saturday Night, and was projected to gross $1–3 million from 1,740 theaters in its opening weekend. The film made $590,000 on its first day, including $150,000 from Thursday night previews. It went on to debut to $1.6 million, finishing 10th. Anthony D'Alessandro of Deadline Hollywood said Briarcliff Entertainment struggled to market the film because of a limited marketing spend, despite its controversies with the former president; iSpot, which tracks TV spots, said there were no spots registered for The Apprentice, and theatrical trailers supposed to be attached to Wolfs were reduced after that film scaled back its release. Furthermore, Briarcliff could not start booking theaters and fully promoting the film until Labor Day weekend, which complicated its rollout.

=== Critical response ===
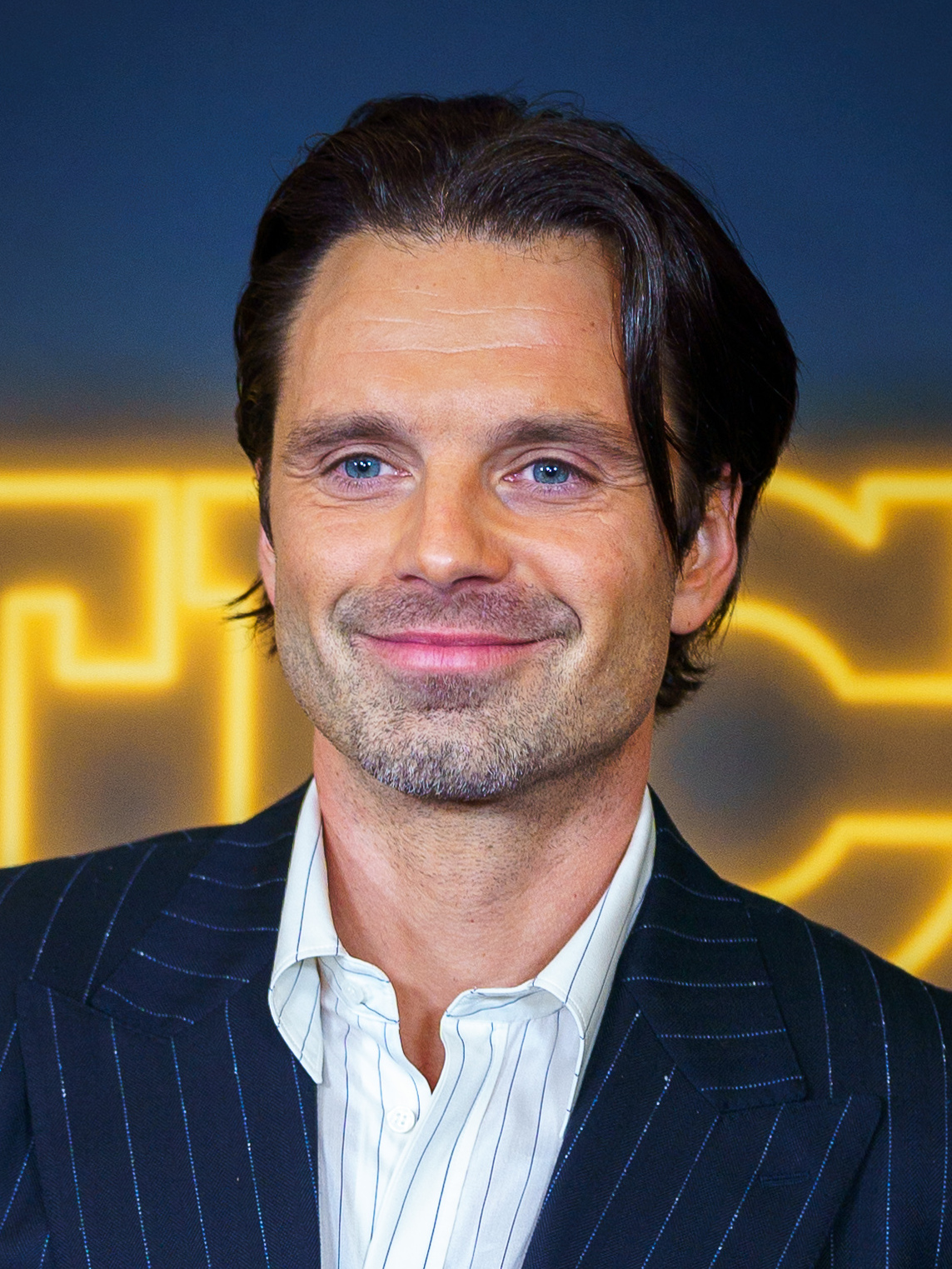
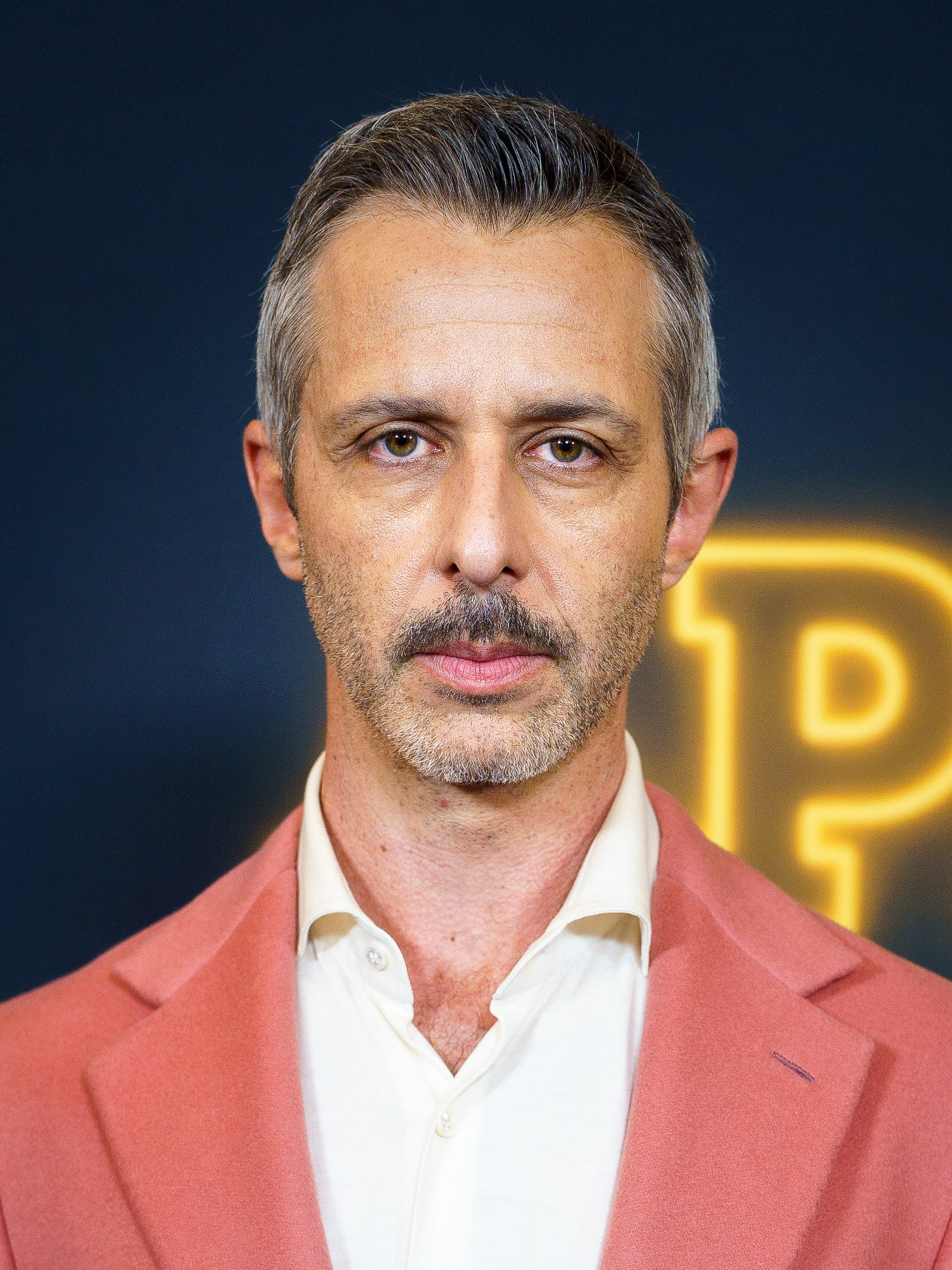
Sebastian Stan and Jeremy Strong garnered critical acclaim for their performances and earned Academy Award nominations for Best Actor and Best Supporting Actor.

On the review aggregator website Rotten Tomatoes, 83% of 252 critics' reviews are positive, with an average rating of 6.9/10. The website's consensus reads: "Instead of cross-examining its subject, The Apprentice gives Sebastian Stan the chance to shine in a simplistic yet entertaining foray into the world of a young Trump." Metacritic, which uses a weighted average, assigned the film a score of 64 out of 100, based on 54 critics, indicating "generally favorable" reviews. Audiences polled by CinemaScore gave the film an average grade of "B–" on an A+ to F scale, while those surveyed by PostTrak gave it a 71% overall positive score, with 46% saying they would definitely recommend it. On AlloCiné, the film received an average rating of 3.6 out of 5, based on 30 reviews from French critics.

David Rooney in The Hollywood Reporter praised Sebastian Stan and Jeremy Strong's performances in the film with Stan "going beyond impersonation to capture the essence of the man". Beyond the portrayal of Trump and Cohn, Rooney writes that the film examines the rise of 'winners' and 'losers' thinking in American life from the cynicism of the Nixon years to the rise of corporate greed during the Reagan presidency in the 1980s. The Times' Kevin Maher gave the film 4/5 stars, writing, "This is the Donald Trump movie that you never knew you needed: full of compassionate feeling yet ruthless in analysis." James Croot of Stuff also gave the film 4/5 stars, calling it "an engrossing mentor-mentee tale (à la The Color of Money or Wall Street: Money Never Sleeps) that showcases two, quite frankly, amazing performances."

Peter Bradshaw of The Guardian gave the film 2/5 stars, writing, "Director Ali Abbasi has given us fascinating monsters in the past with Holy Spider and Border but the monstrosity here is almost sentimental, a cartoon Xeroxed from many other satirical Trump takes and knowing prophetic echoes of his political future."

Roger Stone tweeted of Strong, "I knew Roy Cohn. Roy Cohn was a friend of mine. As much as I hate to say it, this guy deserves an Oscar". He added, "I am, however, much better looking than the guy they had playing me" (Rendall).

=== Accolades ===
Award	Date of ceremony	Category	Recipient(s)	Result	Ref.
Cannes Film Festival	May 25, 2024	Palme d'Or	Ali Abbasi	Nominated	
Astra Film Awards	December 8, 2024	Best Indie Feature	The Apprentice	Nominated	
San Francisco Bay Area Film Critics Circle	December 15, 2024	Best Supporting Actor	Jeremy Strong	Nominated	
Toronto Film Critics Association	December 15, 2024	Outstanding Supporting Performance	Jeremy Strong	Nominated	
Florida Film Critics Circle	December 20, 2024	Best Supporting Actor	Jeremy Strong	Won	
Golden Globe Awards	January 5, 2025	Best Actor in a Motion Picture – Drama	Sebastian Stan	Nominated	
Golden Globe Awards	January 5, 2025	Best Supporting Actor – Motion Picture	Jeremy Strong	Nominated	
Austin Film Critics Association	January 6, 2025	Best Supporting Actor	Jeremy Strong	Nominated	
Robert Awards	February 1, 2025	Best English Language Film	The Apprentice	Won	
London Film Critics' Circle	February 2, 2025	Supporting Actor of the Year	Jeremy Strong	Nominated	
Artios Awards	February 12, 2025	Outstanding Achievement in Casting – Feature Studio or Independent (Drama)	Carmen Cuba, Stephanie Gorin, and Brendan Wilcocks	Nominated	
British Academy Film Awards	February 16, 2025	Best Actor in a Leading Role	Sebastian Stan	Nominated	
British Academy Film Awards	February 16, 2025	Best Actor in a Supporting Role	Jeremy Strong	Nominated	
British Academy Film Awards	February 16, 2025	Best Casting	Carmen Cuba and Stephanie Gorin	Nominated	
Film Independent Spirit Awards	February 22, 2025	Best Director	Ali Abbasi	Nominated	
Film Independent Spirit Awards	February 22, 2025	Best Lead Performance	Sebastian Stan	Nominated	
Film Independent Spirit Awards	February 22, 2025	Best Editing	Olivier Bugge Coutté and Olivia Neergaard-Holm	Nominated	
Actor Awards	February 23, 2025	Outstanding Performance by a Male Actor in a Supporting Role	Jeremy Strong	Nominated	
César Awards	February 28, 2025	Best Foreign Film	The Apprentice	Nominated	
Academy Awards	March 2, 2025	Best Actor	Sebastian Stan	Nominated	
Academy Awards	March 2, 2025	Best Supporting Actor	Jeremy Strong	Nominated	
Canadian Screen Awards	May 30 – June 1, 2025	Best Motion Picture	Daniel Bekerman	Won	
Canadian Screen Awards	May 30 – June 1, 2025	Best Lead Performance in a Drama Film	Sebastian Stan	Won	
Canadian Screen Awards	May 30 – June 1, 2025	Best Supporting Performance in a Drama Film	Jeremy Strong	Won	
Canadian Screen Awards	May 30 – June 1, 2025	Best Makeup	Colin Penman, Brandi Boulet, and Sean Sansom	Won	
Canadian Screen Awards	May 30 – June 1, 2025	Best Hair	Michelle Côté, Charlotte Delaet, and Sandra Kelly	Won	

=== Legal issues ===
Trump described the film as "a cheap, defamatory, and politically disgusting hatchet job" and described those involved in it as "human scum".

Billionaire Dan Snyder, formerly the owner of the Washington Commanders NFL team, invested money in the production of The Apprentice with the impression that the film would be a positive portrayal of Trump. Snyder is a close friend of Trump who donated $1.1 million to his inaugural committee and Trump Victory Committee in 2016 and $100,000 to his 2020 presidential campaign. After seeing a cut of the film in February 2024, Snyder was said to be furious, and lawyers for the Snyder-backed Kinematics production company sought to stop the release of the film.

On May 20, 2024, Variety reported that Steven Cheung, the communications director of Trump's 2024 presidential campaign, threatened legal action over the film. On May 24, Variety reported that Trump's attorneys sent a cease-and-desist letter to the filmmakers, seeking to block "all marketing, distribution, and publication of the Movie." The film's producers responded to the letter by issuing a statement saying, "The film is a fair and balanced portrait of the former president. We want everyone to see it and then decide."

Subsequent to this, Abbasi offered to screen the film for Trump, believing that he might approve of its depiction of him. He also said that realistic films need to be produced about the threat of fascism.

In September 2024, Dan Snyder and his production company Kinematics sold its stake in the film, citing creative differences. Snyder was reportedly motivated to depart because of the film's unflattering and controversial portrayal of the central figure. The stake was acquired by James Shani and his production company Rich Spirit, which was already involved in the film with an original investment of $500,000.

The film includes controversial scenes, including those that depict Trump violently raping his first wife, Ivana, abusing amphetamines to lose weight, and undergoing liposuction and plastic surgery to remove a bald spot. The rape scene was based on divorce records. In a deposition under oath, rendered during their divorce proceedings, Ivana accused Donald of rape and of pulling out her hair by the handful when his plastic surgery to alter his hairline failed. Sherman cited the Trump biography Lost Tycoon: The Many Lives of Donald J. Trump, by Harry Hurt, as the main source for Trump's use of amphetamines and said, "There's been other reporting over the years that Trump, in the '80s, took these pills that essentially are amphetamines, and they kind of give you manic energy...It's always been one of the explanations for why he went on this deal-making binge...I felt it was one of the themes of the film—as Trump gains more power, he loses touch with his own humanity. I thought of the diet pills as him trying to develop this superpower of never needing to sleep."

== See also ==
- The Apprentice — American reality television series co-produced by Donald Trump, who was the show's host for the first fourteen seasons prior to his first election as President
- Donald Trump in popular culture
- List of performances of LGBTQ Characters Nominated for or Awarded Best Actor in a Supporting Role
