= Alexis Louder =

American actress

- Born: August 31, 1991 (age 35); Charlotte, North Carolina, U.S.
- Occupation: Actress
- Years active: 2014–present

Alexis Louder (born August 31, 1991) is an American actress from Charlotte, North Carolina. She is known for 2021's The Tomorrow War and Copshop.

== Career ==
Louder graduated from the University of North Carolina at Charlotte's College of Arts + Architecture in 2013.

She guest starred as Lisina in the 5th season of The Originals, and in Watchmen as Ruth Williams, the late mother of Hooded Justice and great-grandmother of Sister Night.

Louder played Nicole Deptul in Amazon Prime Video's The Terminal List.

== Filmography ==
=== Film ===
Year	Title	Role	Notes
2017	Silence Her	Riley "Yang" Jansen	
2018	Black Panther	Nigerian Woman #2	
2019	Dolphin Kick	Nova	
2019	Harriet	Jane	
2021	The Tomorrow War	Diablo	
2021	Copshop	Valerie Young	
2022	Violent Night	Linda	
2023	Weathering	Gemina	
2026	Babies		
2026	Give Me Some Sugah		

=== Television ===
Year	Title	Role	Notes
2015	Acing the Undergrad: The Show	Michelle Scott	4 episodes
2016	Wishful Thinking	Amy	Miniseries
2016	Fatal Attraction	LaShonda Spell	Episode: "Gasping for Air"
2016	Your Worst Nightmare	Sabrina Davies	Episode: "Primal Instincts"
2017	Podcasters		Television film
2018	The Quad	Angela Moore	3 episodes
2018	NCIS: New Orleans	Sophie Kendrick	Episode: "Mind Games"
2018	The Originals	Lisana	5 episodes
2018	Greenleaf	Lisa Nolan	Episode: "Chain of Command"
2018	Star	Bianca	2 episodes
2019	Chicago P.D.	Jasmine Price	2 episodes
2019	Deadly Dispatch	Shania	Television film
2019	Watchmen	Ruth Williams	5 episodes
2020	Charmed	Lee Duhon	Episode: "The Enemy of My Frenemy"
2020	Teenage Bounty Hunters	Clea Kincaid	Episode: "This Must Be How Dumb Kids Feel"
2020	The Good Lord Bird		Episode: "A Wicked Plot"
2022	The Terminal List	Nicole Deptul	4 episodes
