= Colin C =

American musician and audio engineer

Colin C.
- Born: Colin Cameron Allrich; Cape Cod, Massachusetts, U.S.
- Genres: Breakbeat, Electronic Rock, Industrial, Progressive House, Techno, Soundtrack
- Years active: 1998-present
- Labels: Lost Language; Renaissance Records; Thrive Records; Polytechnic Recordings; Confusion Inc. Metropolis Records; System Recordings
- Website: thecellstudio.com

Colin C. (born Colin Cameron Allrich in Cape Cod, Massachusetts) is an American musician, remixer, audio engineer, and sound designer who began his career as a self-taught musician and producer with the first wave internet musicians associated with MP3.com's launch in the late 90s while living on Cape Cod, Massachusetts. In these early years he was known for exploring PC computer based sequencing with Jeskola Buzz and working in various early EDM genres. Colin found music inspiring from an early age and as a teenager discovered electronic music via U.S. based Wax Trax! Imports such as Underworld and Autechre that would fuel his desire to produce and DJ.

Colin spent the early 2000s living in Los Angeles, California working a day job with Apple computer as a Logic Pro certified trainer and DJing around LA and Hollywood nightly, opening for DJs such as Paul Oakenfold. With connections in the Progressive House and Progressive Breaks community, he began to release club music with labels such as Lost Language, Cyber Recordings, Thrive/Renaissance and Global Underground.

Having stated he doesn't see himself stuck in a particular genre, Colin's work evolved in 2010 when a Post-Punk Rock song written as his self-described Deadwave HORRORFALL project was selected by Gary Calamar to be included in the HBO series True Blood after being pitched by his bandmate through mutual connections. From here Colin's Slighter project wrote “No Control” for FOX's “Bones” for character Sweets’ gun range montage and in 2011 with providing “Hells Gates” to a street fight scene in Lionsgate Films “Blood Out” starring Luke Goss. Colin spent most of the 2010s syncing music to various television shows as well as The People's Choice broadcast.

Believing that he is best suited in the studio than performing live, Colin's production work led him into sound design with collaboration with Loopmasters to create Logic Pro packs for users to tighten up their mix engineering skills. Colin has also created sample packs for Splice, CAPSUN ProAudio, Soundtrack Loops and others, as well as mixing and mastering for various clients out of his The Cell Studio.

Colin releases music under his own publishing and label, Confusion Inc., after having self-described “bad luck” with working with labels. Calling his projects ‘music for consumption’ from his various projects on Bandcamp Colin explore styles adjacent to Industrial with high-profile remixes for Metropolis Records artists Front Line Assembly, My Life With The Thrill Kill Kult side project Trash Deity, and Ivardensphere as well as others like Battle Tapes, Angelspit, Rabbit Junk, and Go Fight along with his remixes for UK labels Lost Language (Space Manoeuvers' "Stage One") and Adjust Recordings (Dan Welton's "Lisopain"). His remix of "Lisopain" was well received by DJ Hernán Cattáneo who included it in his "Sequential" mixed compilation for Renaissance Records which was distributed stateside by Thrive Records and worldwide with BMG Records.

He is the adopted son of American screenwriter and painter, Steve Allrich.

== Projects ==
- Slighter
- HORRORFALL- A musical collective with rotating members, first single "Necroplasm Fix" debuted on True Blood, season 3.
- Heatsync
- The Pushers
- Deeptone

== Selected discography ==
- Slighter - Turmoil [CBS "Elementary"]
- Slighter - Deadly [FOX "Lethal Weapon" and SYFY "Defiance"]
- Slighter - Hells Gates [Lionsgate Films "Blood Out" and Showtime "House Of Lies"]
- Slighter - No Control (Single) - written for FOX's "Bones"
- HORRORFALL - Necroplasm Fix [HBO "True Blood" Soundtrack]
- HORRORFALL - All Away [USA Network "Covert Affairs" Soundtrack]
- Hernán Cattáneo - Renaissance: Sequential : Dan Welton - Lisopain (The Pushers Sublingual Dub)
- John Graham (as 'Space Manoeures') - Factoid : Stage One (Deeptone Remix)

== Notable remixes ==
- "Next War", "Leveled" - Front Line Assembly
- "Hard Times", "New Son Army" - Hate Dept.
- "Shadow Horizon" - Rabbit Junk
- "Don't Know Zero" - Angelspit
- "Ragemaker" - Ivardensphere
- "No Cable" - Landscape Body Machine
