= Copshop =

2021 film by Joe Carnahan

- Dutch theatrical release poster
- Directed by: Joe Carnahan
- Screenplay by: Kurt McLeod; Joe Carnahan
- Story by: Mark Williams; Kurt McLeod
- Produced by: Mark Williams; Tai Duncan; Warren Goz; Eric Gold; Joe Carnahan; Frank Grillo; Gerard Butler; Alan Siegel; James Masciello
- Starring: Gerard Butler; Frank Grillo; Alexis Louder; Toby Huss
- Cinematography: Juan Miguel Azpiroz
- Edited by: Kevin Hale
- Music by: Clinton Shorter
- Production companies: Sculptor Media; Zero Gravity Management; G-BASE Film Production; Raven Capital Management; WarParty Films
- Distributed by: Open Road Films Briarcliff Entertainment (United States); STXfilms (International)
- Release dates: September 10, 2021 (United Kingdom); September 17, 2021 (United States)
- Running time: 107 minutes
- Country: United States
- Language: English
- Budget: $43.5 million
- Box office: $6.8 million

Copshop is a 2021 American neo noir action thriller film directed by Joe Carnahan and written by Kurt McLeod and Carnahan, based on a story by McLeod and Mark Williams. The film stars Gerard Butler, Frank Grillo, and Alexis Louder, and is set in a small-town police station that becomes the battleground between a hitman, a novice police officer, and a con artist.

Copshop was released in the United Kingdom on September 10, 2021, by STXfilms, and was released in the United States on September 17, 2021, by Open Road Films. It received generally positive reviews from critics.

== Plot ==
Con artist and fixer Teddy Murretto is on the run in a bullet-riddled unmarked police car, which breaks down near Gun Creek, Nevada. As rookie police officer Valerie Young breaks up a brawl outside a casino, Murretto sucker-punches her to intentionally be taken to jail, away from his pursuers. However, hitman Bob Viddick pretends to be a drunk driver, getting himself locked up at the same police station.

Placed in separate cells, Viddick reveals his identity to Murretto. Corrupt officer Huber has been coerced to steal drugs from the evidence locker, while Viddick has planted a small incendiary device disguised as an insulin pump, which sets off the fire alarm. In the confusion, Viddick beats a drunken man sharing his cell and incapacitates police sergeant Mitchell, taking his gun. Before he can kill Murretto, he is interrupted by Young, who returns Viddick to his cell and saves the wounded drunk with an impromptu tracheotomy.

Murretto explains his situation to Young: on behalf of his criminal employers, he tried to buy off the state's attorney general, William Fenton, who refused to cooperate and was killed. Fenton had recorded their conversations, forcing Murretto to agree to work with the FBI, which led the mob to want him dead. He was nearly executed by corrupt Las Vegas cops who were caught in a shootout with the FBI, but escaped in the officers' unmarked car.

Young learns that Murretto's ex-wife and son have been killed by Las Vegas police detective Deena Schier, who secretly clears up the scene of the FBI shootout with her fellow corrupt officers. While Murretto and Viddick trade threats, rival hitman Anthony Lamb arrives, posing as a balloon delivery driver. Lamb quickly murders several police officers and EMTs, prompting Huber to kill Mitchell and the wounded drunk.

Rewriting the passcode for the bulletproof door to the holding cells, Young seals herself inside with Murretto and Viddick, but is hit in the abdomen by one of her own ricochets. She realizes Huber is in league with Lamb's employers, and Huber and Lamb attempt to break through the wall into Murretto's cell. Murretto convinces the gravely wounded Young to release him and takes her pistol, promising to return with medical supplies. She is forced to admit that his family is dead, and Viddick confirms that Lamb killed them.

Two officers return to the station and discover Huber and Lamb, who kill them before being ambushed by Murretto. Viddick persuades Young to free him as well, cutting off the power and filling the station with steam from the showers. Capturing Huber, Viddick tortures him with his own weapons, while Murretto stalks Lamb through the locker rooms. Lamb kills Huber by mistake before being stabbed by Viddick, who offers Murretto the chance to kill Lamb, but Murretto shoots Viddick before finishing Lamb off.

Instead of helping Young, Murretto sets fire to the station, but is confronted by the vengeful Young, who has attended to her gunshot wound. An intense gunfight ensues, and Young wounds Murretto with her last remaining round. She is shot by Schier but saved by her body armor, while Schier is shot dead by Viddick, who has somehow survived. Viddick finally kills Murretto, completing his contract, and escapes in a police car with Murretto's briefcase and Lamb's head in a bag. Being treated by paramedics, Young commandeers the ambulance and drives off in pursuit of Viddick, both of them singing to "Freddie's Dead" over the radio.

== Cast ==
- Gerard Butler as Robert K. "Bob" Viddick, a professional hitman
- Frank Grillo as Theodore "Teddy" Murretto, a con artist
- Alexis Louder as Valerie "Val" Young, a rookie police officer
- Toby Huss as Anthony "Tony" Lamb, a psychotic killer with a contract on Murretto
- Chad Coleman as Duane Mitchell, a police sergeant
- Ryan O'Nan as Officer Huber
- Jose Pablo Cantillo as Officer Pena
- Kaiwi Lyman-Mersereau as Officer Barnes
- Robert Walker-Branchaud as Officer Kimball
- Tracey Bonner as Detective Deena Schier
- Christopher Michael Holley as Officer Ruby
- Marshall Cook as Brad
- Keith Jardine as Trooper, a state trooper

In addition, the opening actor credits specifically include Ben Hoffman, who served as a Viddick stunt double, and Michael Morales, who served as the stunt coordinator.

== Production ==
=== Development and casting ===
In September 2020, it was announced that Gerard Butler and Frank Grillo would star in the action thriller film called Copshop, which would be directed by Joe Carnahan. The screenplay was written by Kurt McLeod, based on a story by McLeod and Mark Williams. It is the first produced screenplay for McLeod, who works as a financial advisor in Edmonton, Alberta, Canada. The most recent draft was written by Carnahan. The film was produced by Williams and Tai Duncan through Zero Gravity Management, Warren Goz and Eric Gold through Sculptor Media, Butler and Alan Siegel through their company G-BASE Productions, and Carnahan and Grillo through their company WarParty Films.

In October 2020, Alexis Louder was cast in the third starring role. Later that month, Ryan O'Nan, Kaiwi Lyman-Mersereau and Toby Huss were cast in supporting roles.

=== Filming ===
Principal photography began in October 2020 at Blackhall Studios in Atlanta, Georgia. Filming also took place in Albuquerque, New Mexico. On October 2, filming was shut down after three crew members tested positive for COVID-19 in the midst of the ongoing pandemic. Filming had resumed by October 5, and had wrapped by November 20.

According to Frank Grillo, director Joe Carnahan's cut of the film was rejected in favor of a different cut which did not include as much of his performance.

=== Lawsuit ===
Screenwriter Kurt McLeod entered into an agreement to option his screenplay for the movie to Sculptor Media, with the purchase price linked to the film's budget (2.5% of the budget, with a floor of $75,000 and cap of $125,000). Initially informed that the budget would range from $3 million to $10 million, McLeod later discovered that it had significantly increased to approximately $43.5 million after Gerard Butler joined the project. In response, McLeod sued Zero Gravity Management in March 2022, alleging breach of contract and fiduciary duty, accusing them of not disclosing the substantial budget increase and failing to renegotiate his compensation. However, on January 9, 2024, U.S. District Judge Fred W. Slaughter issued an order granting summary judgment in favor of Zero Gravity and its founders, Eric and Mark Williams, rejecting McLeod's claims, deeming it speculative to assert that McLeod would have received additional compensation based on the budget increase and emphasizing that McLeod had outside counsel during fee negotiations. Additionally, the court found that the Williams brothers were not personally involved in the deal between McLeod and Zero Gravity as producers of the movie. The legal saga also involved an arbitration with the Writers Guild of America over writing credits, resulting in credits for McLeod and Mark Williams for the story and McLeod and Joe Carnahan for the screenplay.

== Release ==
Copshop was released in the United Kingdom and Ireland on September 10, 2021, by STXfilms and was released in the United States on September 17, 2021, by Open Road Films.

=== Home media ===
The film released digitally on November 23, 2021 and on Blu-ray and DVD in December 7, 2021. Netflix released the film on January 15, 2022 in multiple regions.

== Reception ==
=== Box office ===
Copshop grossed $5.2 million in the United States and Canada, and $1.5 million in other territories, for a worldwide total of $6.8 million.

In the United States and Canada, Copshop was released alongside Cry Macho, and was projected to gross around $5 million from 3,005 theaters in opening weekend. The film made $950,000 on its first day and went on to debut to $2.3 million, finishing sixth at the box office. It was the second-worst opening of all-time by a film playing in over 3,000 theaters. The film dropped 45% to $1.3 million in its second weekend, finishing eighth.

=== Critical response ===
On Rotten Tomatoes the film has an approval rating of 82% based on 112 reviews, with an average rating of 6.50/10. The website's critics consensus reads: "It doesn't add many new ingredients to the genre, but action fans in the mood for an old-school thriller will be happy to buy what Copshop is selling." On Metacritic it has a weighted average score of 61 out of 100 based on reviews from 22 critics, indicating "generally favorable" reviews. Audiences surveyed by PostTrak gave the film a 62% positive score, with 39% saying they would definitely recommend it.

Ian Freer of Empire called it: "A simple, effective thriller, Copshop doubles down on pulpy, '70s-styled fun. It proffers little that is novel but has enough vim and vigour to compensate."
