= Tom Ortenberg =

American businessman, film studio executive, and film producer

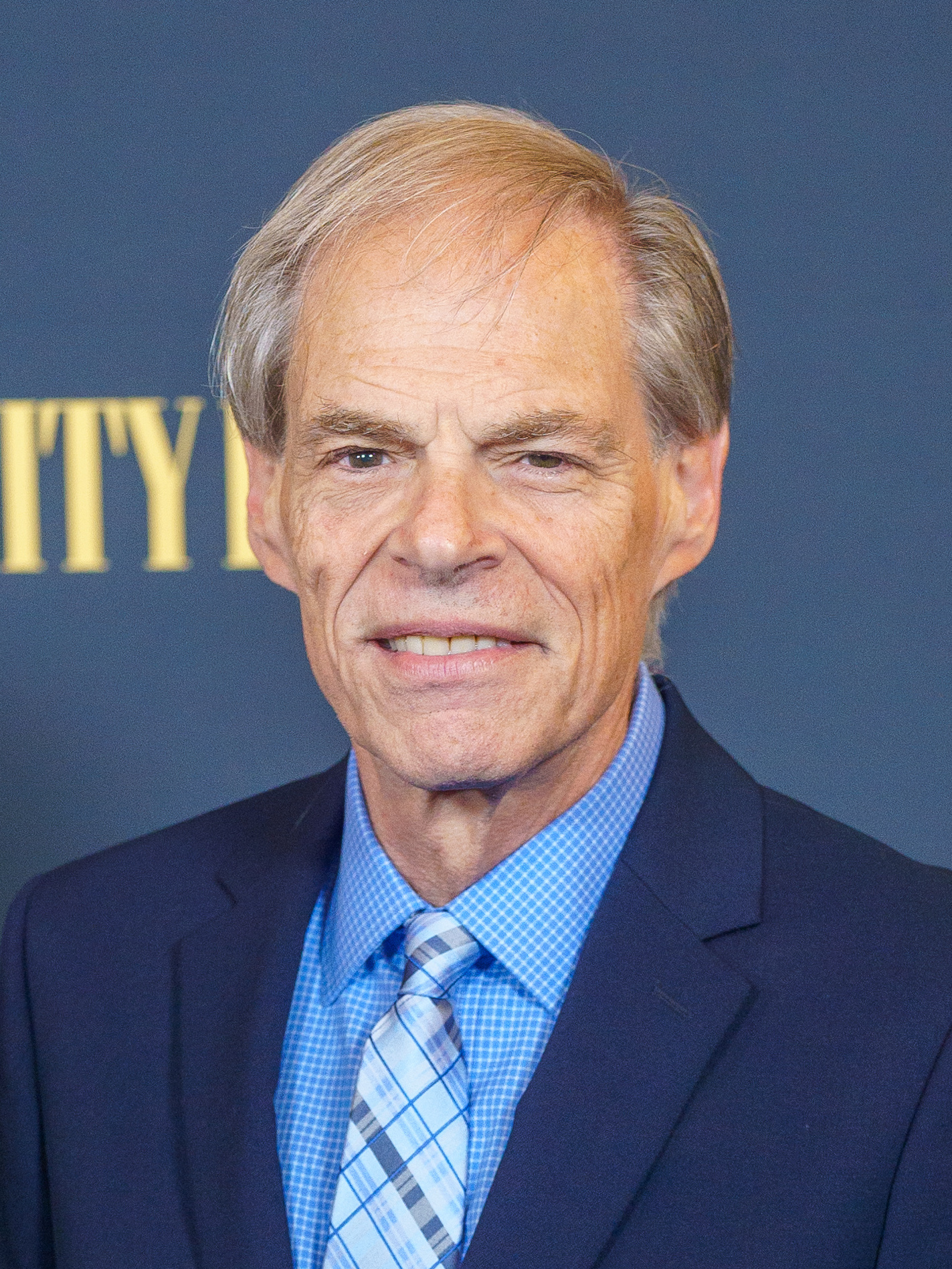
- Ortenberg in 2024
- Born: August 8, 1960 (age 66); Briarcliff Manor, New York, U.S.
- Occupations: Businessman; film studio executive; film producer
- Employer: Briarcliff Entertainment
- Title: Chief executive officer
- Children: 3

Tom Ortenberg (born August 8, 1960) is an American businessman, film studio executive, and film producer. He is the principal of Briarcliff Entertainment. Ortenberg is the former CEO of Open Road Films and president of theatrical films at The Weinstein Company and Lionsgate Films.

== Early life and career ==
Ortenberg was born on August 8, 1960, in Briarcliff Manor, New York. He attended Pennsylvania State University and graduated in 1982. While at Penn State, he first dabbled in film, showing recent theatrical movies on campus to raise money for non-profit student groups, including the Consumer Party, a political organization which he co-founded and ran for office with. After moving to San Francisco, he began his film career with Columbia Pictures in 1985 as a clerk and joined Hemdale Film Corporation in 1989, where he briefly became president of distribution and marketing after the company filed for bankruptcy and laid off the C-level officers of the company.

He then joined Lionsgate Films as its President of Theatrical Films, where he was the first employee in its Los Angeles office. Ortenberg led Lionsgate's film division as it quickly grew from an independent arthouse distributor into one of Hollywood's leading movie studios. In 2009, he left Lionsgate to join The Weinstein Company as president of theatrical films.

In 2011, it was announced that he would become the founding CEO of Open Road Films, a newly formed movie studio owned by the theatre chains AMC Theatres and Regal Entertainment Group. In 2016, he endorsed Bernie Sanders for President of the United States.

After seven years at the helm, which included a Best Picture Oscar win for Spotlight at the 2016 Academy Awards, as well as films such as Nightcrawler and End of Watch, Ortenberg left Open Road in 2017 after Tang Media Partners acquired it.

He then founded Briarcliff Entertainment, a distribution company which has since released over a dozen films theatrically. During the summer of 2024, it was reported that Briarcliff was close to a deal to release the controversial Donald Trump biopic The Apprentice after it initially languished without a distributor in America following its premiere at the Cannes Film Festival, and a deal was later confirmed with an October 11 release date set.

Ortenberg revealed Briarcliff was the only distributor to make a serious theatrical release offer for the film due to Trump's legal threats, lambasting the industry's "cowardice." Speaking to the Wall Street Journal, he said, "the creative community is supposed to be bolder than this. We're supposed to take chances."

== Personal life ==
Ortenberg lives with his wife Edie and his three children, Jason, Andrew, and Cole, in Santa Monica, California. He is a member of the Academy of Motion Pictures Arts and Sciences and is a trustee of the British Academy of Film and Television Arts.
