= The Canyon (film) =

2009 thriller film

- Theatrical release poster
- Directed by: Richard Harrah
- Written by: Steve Allrich
- Produced by: Michael A. Pierce; Mark Williams
- Starring: Yvonne Strahovski; Will Patton; Eion Bailey
- Cinematography: Nelson Cragg
- Edited by: Peter Fandetti
- Music by: Heitor Pereira
- Production company: Pierce/Williams Entertainment
- Distributed by: Magnolia Pictures
- Release date: October 23, 2009
- Country: United States
- Language: English
- Budget: $10 million

The Canyon is a 2009 thriller film written by Steve Allrich and directed by Richard Harrah. Starring Eion Bailey, Yvonne Strahovski, Will Patton.

== Plot ==
The story starts with Nick and Lori, a newlywed couple who, after eloping, want to take a mule ride down into the canyon with a guide, Henry. The next day the trio head down into the canyon. After traveling for a while the guide offers to take them to old petroglyphs, which are a half day's ride away. After some convincing from Nick, Lori eventually agrees to the journey. Along the way, Henry is bitten twice by rattlesnakes and in the process the trio's mules flee. They are forced to make camp and begin heading back the next day. The guide is delirious and later in the day succumbs to the venom and dies. The couple bury him and are left to struggle on to find a way out. After a day's hike, the couple eventually reach a dead end where the petroglyphs are. Realizing they have spent the last day going the wrong way, they decide to attempt to climb up the rock face in the hope of getting a signal on Lori's phone. Lori manages to call the emergency services but has only time to say they are in trouble before losing signal. Nick loses his grip in the crevice and the couple fall, breaking Lori's phone and Nick's leg, which gets trapped in a crevice at the base of the rock face.

Nick's leg is completely trapped and after a day of waiting and hoping for a rescue party to arrive, he suggests they cut his leg off so they can keep going. Lori at first disagrees with the plan, but eventually relents and retrieves Henry's knife from his body, then returns to Nick. By this point, infection has set in and Nick is in very bad shape, barely being able to move at all. Lori succeeds in severing Nick's leg and cauterizes the wound by heating the blade of the knife on the fire. When night falls, a pack of wolves gets attracted by the smell of blood and tries to attack them, but Lori successfully chases them off with fire and the knife.

At sunrise, Lori fashions a stretcher to move Nick, but the wolves track the smell and keep following them. The stretcher breaks but Lori still attempts to drag Nick on, rejecting his pleas to leave him behind. The wolves are relentless in their attack, and being exhausted from days without food or water, Lori loses the ability to defend him. The wolves surround them, so to prevent Nick from suffering through being eaten alive, she performs euthanasia on him by suffocating him. She breaks down and goes into shock as a rescue helicopter rounds the edge of the canyon; paramedics start to administer first aid while she is kneeling next to Nick's body.

== Cast ==
- Yvonne Strahovski as Lori Conway
- Will Patton as Henry
- Eion Bailey as Nick Conway
- Wendy Worthington as Motel Manager
- Andrea Marcellus as Park Ranger
- Philip Salick as Elvis Impersonator

== Production ==
Filmed on locations in Arizona and Utah.

== Release ==
The film opened in cinemas for a limited release on October 23, 2009. The DVD of the film was released on November 17, 2009.
