= Mark Williams (filmmaker) =

American film director, producer, and writer

- Years active: 1995–present
- Known for: Ozark (creator); The Accountant (producer); Honest Thief (director)

Mark Williams is an American film director, writer, and producer.

He is best known as the creator of the television show, Ozark. He was nominated for three Emmys in 2019, 2020, and 2022 for his work on the show. He was also written and directed for film, including the 2020 film Honest Thief and the 2022 film Blacklight.

== Selected filmography ==
=== Film ===
Year	Title	Director	Writer	Producer
2016	A Family Man	Yes	No	Yes
2020	Honest Thief	Yes	Yes	Yes
2021	Copshop	No	Story	Yes
2022	Blacklight	Yes	Yes	Yes

Producer

- In Enemy Hands (2004)
- Flawless (2007)
- Shuttle (2008)
- Malice in Wonderland (2009)
- The Canyon (2009)
- Victim (2010)
- Arena (2011) (Direct-to-video)
- Bad Karma (2011)
- The Accountant (2016)
- A Dark Place (2018)
- The Marksman (2021)
- The Accountant 2 (2025)

Executive producer

- Manolete (2008)
- Exit (2011)
- Java Heat (2013)
- Hypnotic (2023)

Special thanks

- The Cooler (2003)

=== Television ===
Associate producer

- The Choir (1995)
- Madson (1996)
- The Scold's Bridle (1998)
- Undercover Heart (1998)
- Casualty (1999−2004)
- Nuts vs. Zoo (2007) (Documentary)

Producer

- In Exile (1998)

Executive producer

- Ozark (2017−22) (Also creator and stories writer)
