= IM Global =

American independent film and TV production company

InterMedia Global, LLC
- Formerly: Global Road Television Entertainment (2018)
- Type: Private
- Industry: Film; Television
- Predecessor: Intermedia Films
- Founded: April 2007; 19 years ago
- Founder: Stuart Ford
- Defunct: September 2018; 8 years ago
- Fate: Merged Into Open Road Films
- Successor: AGC Studios; Tang Media Partners; Open Road Films
- Headquarters: Los Angeles, California, United States
- Key people: Stuart Ford (CEO)
- Products: Motion Pictures; TV Series
- Divisions: IM Global Television; IM Global Music
- Subsidiaries: Apsara Distribution; AutoMatik (joint-venture with Entertainment One)
- Website: Official website

IM Global, LLC was an American independent film and TV production company. The company was founded by Stuart Ford in April 2007 and operating in international film, television and music production, as well as sales and international distribution. The company financed or produced over 30 Hollywood feature films and controlled a library of over 300 films.

IM Global was the 2015 recipient of the Variety Award for Achievement in International Film.

From April 2010, the company's two shareholders were Reliance Entertainment, a subsidiary of Indian billionaire Anil Ambani's Reliance ADA group, and Ford himself. Reliance Entertainment is also one of the main investors in Steven Spielberg's DreamWorks Pictures. Due to Reliance's investment in IM Global, with Ford and his Indian partners, the company expanded internationally with offices in Los Angeles, New York, London, Beijing, Mexico City and Mumbai.

In June 2016, Tang Media Partners acquired majority ownership of IM Global. In 2017, Tang Media Partners merged the IM Global operations with those of Open Road Films and IM Global TV to form Global Road Entertainment. In 2018, Global Road filed for bankruptcy.

== International sales and distribution ==
IM Global acts as producer, financier and international sales agent for films such as Paranormal Activity, Insidious, Sinister and A Haunted House. IM Global's Anthem subsidiary specialises in the global distribution of Latin American cinema via Latino film sales joint venture Mundial, Chinese cinema via an exclusive output arrangement with Chinese studio Huayi Bros and Bollywood cinema via the pipeline from shareholder Reliance Entertainment. Overall, IM Global controls a library of more than 300 films. IM Global's titles secured number one international box office shares in the global film sector outside of the major Hollywood studios in both 2013 and 2014.

IM Global's library has included the distribution rights to the Spyglass Entertainment, Intermedia, Largo Entertainment, Beacon Pictures, and Distant Horizon libraries.

== Production and financing ==
The company has produced over thirty features and has worked alongside onscreen talent such as Matthew McConaughey, Johnny Depp, Diane Lane, Anne Hathaway, Julia Roberts, Nicole Kidman, Tom Hardy, Colin Farrell, Noomi Rapace, Jason Statham, Sylvester Stallone, Harrison Ford, and Gary Oldman in its productions.

== Apsara Distribution ==
The company's Apsara Distribution subsidiary is a film rights acquisitions and distribution label covering fourteen South-East Asian distribution markets, in many of which it partners with Disney's Buena Vista International.

== IM Global Television ==
In mid 2014, the company launched IM Global Television, with Mark Stern, former president and partner of Syfy Channel, as president of original content. The division focuses on developing, producing, financing and distribution of scripted content for network, cable and SVOD platforms.

In 2015, Eli Shibley became president of international distribution and co-productions. In addition to managing sales of the scripted slate, Shibley oversees the acquisitions of third party scripted and unscripted projects.

In 2016, IM Global Television launched an unscripted and alternative division led by Emmy award winner Phil Gurin.

== IM Global Music ==
In December 2014 the company launched IM Global Music.
