= Briarcliff Entertainment =

American independent film company

- Industry: Entertainment
- Genre: Independent film
- Founded: July 4, 2018; 8 years ago
- Founder: Tom Ortenberg
- Headquarters: Santa Monica, California, United States of America
- Area served: Worldwide
- Key people: Tom Ortenberg (CEO)
- Services: Film production; Film distribution
- Website: www.briarcliffentertainment.com

Briarcliff Entertainment is an independent American film production and distribution company founded by former Open Road Films CEO Tom Ortenberg. Launched in 2018, the studio debuted with Michael Moore's documentary Fahrenheit 11/9 as their first film. They went on to distribute mainly action films in the ensuing several years, including Honest Thief and Blacklight with Liam Neeson, and Copshop with Gerard Butler.

In addition to Fahrenheit 11/9, the company has released other high-profile political documentaries, including the critically acclaimed The Dissident, about the assassination of Jamal Khashoggi, and Gabby Giffords Won't Back Down.

During the summer of 2024, it was reported that Briarcliff was close to a deal to release the controversial Donald Trump biopic The Apprentice after it initially languished without a distributor in America following its premiere at the Cannes Film Festival, and a deal was later confirmed with an October 11 release date set.

A few months later it was announced they would acquire Magazine Dreams, the Sundance hit that was dropped by Searchlight Pictures following the controversy surrounding its star Jonathan Majors.

== History ==
Briarcliff was founded as an independent theatrical film studio in late 2018 by veteran executive Tom Ortenberg, who was the founding CEO of Open Road Films and formerly the President of Theatrical Films at Lionsgate, where he was the company's first employee in Los Angeles. Their first films were 2018's Fahrenheit 11/9 and 2019's Don't Let Go, a collaboration with Blumhouse Productions.

In 2020, it was announced that Briarcliff would partner with a recently re-launched Open Road to acquire and release films jointly. The partnership distributed films like Kandahar with Gerard Butler and Studio 666, a 2022 horror-comedy made by and starring Dave Grohl and the Foo Fighters.

The company has been noted for their frequent collaboration with Liam Neeson on action films, including Marlowe, Memory, Blacklight and Honest Thief, all released between 2020 and 2023. Also in 2023 they distributed the inspirational baseball film The Hill starring Dennis Quaid, which grossed $7.6 million at the domestic box office.

In 2024, it was reported that they would release The Apprentice, the controversial Donald Trump biopic starring Sebastian Stan and Jeremy Strong that played the Cannes Film Festival and was sent a cease and desist by the former president's legal team. Despite the Trump campaign's attempts to block a sale, it was slated for a release on October 11 shortly before the 2024 United States presidential election.

Due to the legal threats, Briarcliff was the only distribution company to make a serious offer for the film, with Ortenberg slamming Hollywood's "cowardice". In October of that year, Bloomberg reported that the studio was looking to raise between $25–50 million for a minority stake in the company.

Also in 2024, it was announced that they would release Magazine Dreams, which was dropped by Searchlight Pictures following the controversy surrounding star Jonathan Majors despite strong reviews out of Sundance, in early 2025. The same year the company also acquired South by Southwest Audience Award winner My Dead Friend Zoe, starring Morgan Freeman and Ed Harris and executive produced by Travis Kelce, for release in 2025.

In 2025, it was reported that Briarcliff had acquired the rights to Good Luck, Have Fun, Don't Die, the first film in a decade from Pirates of the Caribbean director Gore Verbinski. They released it theatrically on February 13, 2026, and it became the company's highest-grossing opening ever after bringing in $4.15 million in its opening weekend. It was also the highest-grossing opening weekend for any English-language narrative film released by any company on fewer than 1,700 screens in over three years, since Warner Bros.' release of Magic Mike's Last Dance in 2023.

For the marketing campaign on Good Luck, Have Fun, Don't Die, Briarcliff was nominated for five and won two awards at the 2026 Golden Trailer Awards, winning for Best Comedy Poster and Best Independent Trailer.

== Filmography ==
Release date	Title	Co-production with	Notes
September 21, 2018	Fahrenheit 11/9	Midwestern Films	First film distributed by Briarcliff
May 3, 2019	El Chicano	WarParty Films and WarChest Productions	
August 30, 2019	Don't Let Go	Blumhouse Productions	co-distributed with OTL Releasing and BH Tilt
August 18, 2020	Emperor	Sobini Films and Hudlin Entertainment	
October 16, 2020	Honest Thief	The Solution Entertainment Group, Zero Gravity Management, Samuel Marshall Films, and Ingenious Media	co-distributed with Open Road Films
December 25, 2020	The Dissident	Orwell Productions and Human Rights Foundation	
April 30, 2021	Separation	RainMaker Films and Yale Productions	co-distributed with Open Road Films
September 17, 2021	Copshop	Sculptor Media, Zero Gravity Management, G-BASE Film Production, Raven Capital Management, and WarParty Films	American distribution with Open Road Films only
February 11, 2022	Blacklight	Zero Gravity Management, Footloose Productions, The Solution Entertainment Group, Sina Studios, Fourstar Films, Elevate Production Finance, Film Victoria, Lightstream Pictures Australia, and Screen Australia	American distribution only
February 25, 2022	Studio 666	Roswell Films and Therapy Studios	
April 29, 2022	Memory	Black Bear Pictures, Welle Entertainment, and Saville Productions	American distribution with Open Road Films only
May 20, 2022	Good Mourning	Cedar Park Studios and Raven Capital Management	co-distributed with Open Road Films
July 15, 2022	Gabby Giffords Won't Back Down	CNN Films, Time Studios, Storyville Films, and Lisa Espramer Entertainment	
February 15, 2023	Marlowe	Parallel Films, Hills Productions, and Davis Films	American distribution only
April 13, 2023	The Lost Weekend: A Love Story		
April 14, 2023	Sweetwater	Sunset Pictures and Reserve Entertainment	
August 25, 2023	The Hill	Vitamin A Films, Rescue Dog Productions, Piney Pictures	
March 15, 2024	Dogman	Luc Besson Production, EuropaCorp, and TF1 Films Production	American distribution only
May 10, 2024	Not Another Church Movie	JMC Media and Monty the Dog Productions	
October 11, 2024	The Apprentice	Scythia Films, Profile Pictures, Tailored Films, Rich Spirit, AQuest Films, Head Gear Films, Metrol Technology, AC Films Inc., and Wild7 Films	American distribution only
December 6, 2024	Werewolves	Burke Management, Monty the Dog Productions, and Solution Entertainment Group	
January 31, 2025	Valiant One	Factory Underground and Monarch Media	
February 7, 2025	When I'm Ready	19th Hole Productions and Film Bridge International	Co-distributed with Quiver Distribution
February 28, 2025	My Dead Friend Zoe	Radiant Media Studios and Legion M	
March 21, 2025	Magazine Dreams	Los Angeles Media Fund and Tall Street Productions	
April 18, 2025	Sneaks	Lengi Studios, Cinema Gypsy Productions, and House of Cool	American distribution only
May 9, 2025	Juliet & Romeo	Hero Entertainment, and Rainmaker Films	
July 11, 2025	Sovereign	All Night Diner	
October 29, 2025	Stitch Head	Aniventure, GFM Animation, Rabbits Black	
November 28, 2025	The Thing With Feathers	Film4, Sunnymarch, Lobo Films	American distribution only
February 13, 2026	Good Luck, Have Fun, Don't Die	3 Arts Entertainment, Blind Wink Productions, Constantin Film	American distribution only
September 11, 2026	The Fix	Astral Future, Latigo Films, Dreamtime Films	Co-distributed with Inaugural Entertainment
October 2, 2026	Nickels		American distribution only
October 16, 2026	Trust Me, I'm a Doctor		American distribution only
October 30, 2026	Christmas at the Kringles		American distribution only
November 20, 2026	Ash and Crayons		American distribution only

=== Upcoming ===
Release date	Title	Co-production with	Notes
January 29, 2027	Drag		
