= Steve Allrich =

American screenwriter and painter

Steve Allrich (born Chicago, Illinois) is an American screenwriter and painter.

== Biography ==
=== Movie career ===
Screenwriter Steve Allrich is the author of The Canyon directed by Richard Harrah and starring Will Patton, Yvonne Strahovski and Eion Bailey, and Bad Karma, starring Ray Liotta, slated for production May 2011.

=== Painting career ===
A plein aire painter as well as a screenwriter he authored the oil painting instruction book Oil Painting for the Serious Beginner (Watson-Guptill Publications, New York, 1996).

== Personal ==
Allrich is the father of electronic musician and composer Colin C. and screenwriter Alexander D. Allrich. He resides in Los Angeles, California with his wife, artist and blogger Karina Allrich .
