= Open Road Films =

American film production company

Open Road Films, LLC
- Formerly: Global Road Entertainment, LLC (2017–2018)
- Type: Subsidiary
- Industry: Film
- Predecessor: IM Global
- Founded: March 26, 2011; 15 years ago
- Founder: Tom Ortenberg
- Headquarters: Los Angeles, California, U.S.
- Key people: James Masciello; Matt Sidari
- Parent: Raven Capital Management
- Website: www.openroadfilms.com

Open Road Films, LLC (formerly known briefly as Global Road Entertainment) is an American independent film production and distribution company based in Los Angeles, California. It was founded by Tom Ortenberg on March 26, 2011, as a joint venture between the two largest American theatrical exhibitors, AMC Theatres and Regal Entertainment Group, which both owned the company until it was bought out by Tang Media Partners, a media company owned by Donald Tang, in August 2017.

After Tang's purchase, both companies Open Road and IM Global merged and formed "Global Road Entertainment". In September 2018, Global Road declared Chapter 11 bankruptcy.

On November 6, 2018, Open Road agreed to be purchased by Raven Capital Management. Raven completed its acquisition in February 2019.

== Company history ==
=== Open Road Films (first incarnation) ===
In March 2011, rival theater chains AMC Entertainment and Regal Entertainment Group announced the hiring of Tom Ortenberg as chief executive officer of a new company, Open Road Films. Ortenberg, previously an executive of Lionsgate Films and The Weinstein Company, filled out his executive team with the April 2011 hirings of Jason Cassidy (president of marketing), Elliott Kleinberg (General Counsel and executive vice president of operations and business affairs), Steven Andriuzzo (chief financial officer), and Ben Cotner (senior vice president of acquisitions).

Open Road's titles are distributed in the home entertainment market by Universal Pictures Home Entertainment (UPHE), a deal that was signed in June 2011. In June 2011, a few months after it started operations, Open Road Films signed a pay-TV deal with Netflix, which expired in 2016. After Showtime expires in 2020, Netflix re-added Open Road movies in 2020.

The studio released its first film, Killer Elite, on September 23, 2011, directed by Gary McKendry and starring Jason Statham, Clive Owen and Robert De Niro. Open Road's 2015 film Spotlight received six Academy Award nominations and became the surprise winner for Best Picture at the 88th Academy Awards, also winning for Best Original Screenplay. These were the first Oscar wins for the company. Despite these wins, Spotlight was the subject of controversy including some criticism from an author of The New York Times calling it, "a misrepresentation of how the Church dealt with sexual abuse cases", arguing that the movie's biggest flaw was its failure to portray psychologists who had assured Church officials that abusive priests could be safely returned to ministry after undergoing therapy treatments. The film's false portrayal of Jack Dunn, the public relations head and a member of the board at Boston College High School, as a member of the Boston Archdiocesan cover-up (for which the dialogue itself was mythologised) also received criticism.

In October 2013, the studio signed a pay-TV deal with Showtime that began in 2017 and expires in 2020. Open Road and UPHE extended its home distribution deal in February 2014 through 2017.

On October 30, 2014, Open Road announced an international deal with FilmNation Entertainment. The deal would allow the company to purchase worldwide rights and FilmNation selling and servicing international distribution.

=== Global Road Entertainment ===
Logo of Global Road Entertainment.

Tom Ortenberg left Open Road Films and it was purchased by Tang Media Partners in August 2017. Rob Friedman joined Tang Media Partners in August 2017 as chairman and CEO of TMP Entertainment to oversee Open Road, IM Global and IM Global TV. Open Road Films merged with IM Global and formed Global Road Entertainment on October 30, 2017, with Friedman assuming the Global Road chairman and CEO posts.

In 2017, the company announced plans to have a slate of approximately 15 films per year by 2020. At the European Film Market in February 2018, Global Road announced that it anticipated spending $1 billion on film and television productions over the next three years, with production budgets projected to be in the $20 million to $100 million range. In 2018, the company made an agreement with Blumhouse Productions to co-develop and co-finance low budget Chinese language genre films.

Global Road's 2018 film distribution slate includes the teen drama Midnight Sun, starring Bella Thorne and Patrick Schwarzenegger; family comedy Show Dogs, starring Will Arnett; science fiction thriller The Silence, which it acquired for US distribution; the action-thriller Hotel Artemis, starring Jodie Foster and Sterling K. Brown; science fiction family adventure A.X.L.; and animated family adventure-comedy Playmobil: Uncharted.

Upcoming Global Road productions include Serenity, a neo-noir thriller starring Anne Hathaway, Matthew McConaughey, Diane Lane and directed by Steven Knight; Richard Says Goodbye aka The Professor, a comedy-drama starring Johnny Depp and directed by Wayne Roberts; the science-fiction romance Zoe, starring Ewan McGregor; and Mortal, directed by André Øvredal. The company's film I Think We're Alone Now, starring Peter Dinklage, Elle Fanning and Paul Giamatti, premiered at the 2018 Sundance Film Festival.

Global Road's television arm develops scripted and non-scripted programming for both U.S. and global markets. Shows being developed include Cat's Cradle, a limited series based on the novel by Kurt Vonnegut, being written and executive produced by Noah Hawley for FX; Kilroy County, a dark comedy from Alexander Payne and Jim Taylor being developed for Showtime; Jenji Kohan's Lifetime drama American Princess; Muscle Shoals, a drama in development at ABC with Johnny Depp as executive producer; the eight-part crime drama Cold Courage, based on the novels by Pekka Hiltunen; Fried Chicken and Latkes, an adaptation of Rain Pryor's one-woman comedy show; Jett, a crime drama starring and executive produced by Carla Gugino for Cinemax; the reality cooking competition Fridge Wars for Canada's CBC network; and global rights to Idiotest, based on the Game Show Network quiz show.

In January 2018, Global Road signed a development deal with Reginald Hudlin and Byron Phillips through their company New Nation Networks, under which Hudlin and Phillips would develop and produce original content for Global Road. Later that month, the company signed a first-look television deal with Adam Shankman and Jennifer Gibgot's production company Offspring Entertainment; projects announced under this deal include Wolfgang, based on the life of Wolfgang Amadeus Mozart, and an untitled comedy from husband-and-wife actor-producers Carlos and Alexa PenaVega. Around the same time, Global Road also announced co-development deals with French production company Newen and the Ukrainian Film.UA Group.

==== Financing issues ====
Global Road's film unit was taken over by its primary lenders, Bank of America and East West Bank, in August 2018 as Donald Tang had not raised enough funds for Global Road. Lenders did have Global Road release A.X.L. while stopping the release of City of Lies, slated for September 7, 2018. With A.X.L. not doing well at the box office, the company was forced to lay off employees without severance, a requirement of the lenders. The company was also looking to sell a number of its upcoming films, Paws of Fury: The Legend of Hank, City of Lies, The Silence, Duck Duck Goose, Arctic Justice and Playmobil The Movie; it was also "backing out of" development for The Secret Garden. The company was also sued along with TV rights distributor Miramax by lender Bank Leumi over loans for City of Lies.

On September 6, 2018, Global Road's film unit filed for Chapter 11 bankruptcy. On October 23, 2018, Global Road filed with the court plans for an auction of its assets beginning November 7 with a stalking horse bidder selected with term of $800,000 in expenses coverage and a $2.1 million outbid fee if approve by the judge. In November 2018 after lack luster auction bidding, Open Road agreed to be purchased by Raven Capital Management for $87.5 million pending court approval. On December 19, 2018, a Delaware bankruptcy judge approved the purchase and the acquisition took effect on February 7, 2019.

=== Open Road Films (second incarnation) ===
Open Road Films indicated its comeback in June 2020 at the virtual Cannes by announcing its recapitalization by Raven and named the production company's leadership of Raven principal James Masciello with key assistance from Matt Sidari. The company also announced it was partnering with Briarcliff Entertainment, Tom Ortenberg's new company, in acquiring and releasing films starting with Honest Thief. Raven also indicated that it was a financier of Sculptor Media, whom Raven would look toward for development and production of films.

== Management ==
In August 2017, Rob Friedman was named Global Road's chairman and CEO after Eric Hohl left the company. Rodolphe Buet was named president of international in October 2017, and the following month Lynn Harris was named president of worldwide production. In early 2018, Jack Pan was named president of worldwide theatrical marketing.

In March 2018, the company announced several new hires to their international operations division, including Charlotte Van Weede as President of International Sales (replacing Michael Rothstein); Brad Kembel as Executive Vice President of Distribution and Operations; Melissa Martinez as Executive Vice President of International Marketing; and Sarah Genazzani as Director of International Marketing, with Executive Vice President of International Sales Tatyana Joffe extending her contract to work with the new team.
