= Party princess =

Type of children's party entertainer

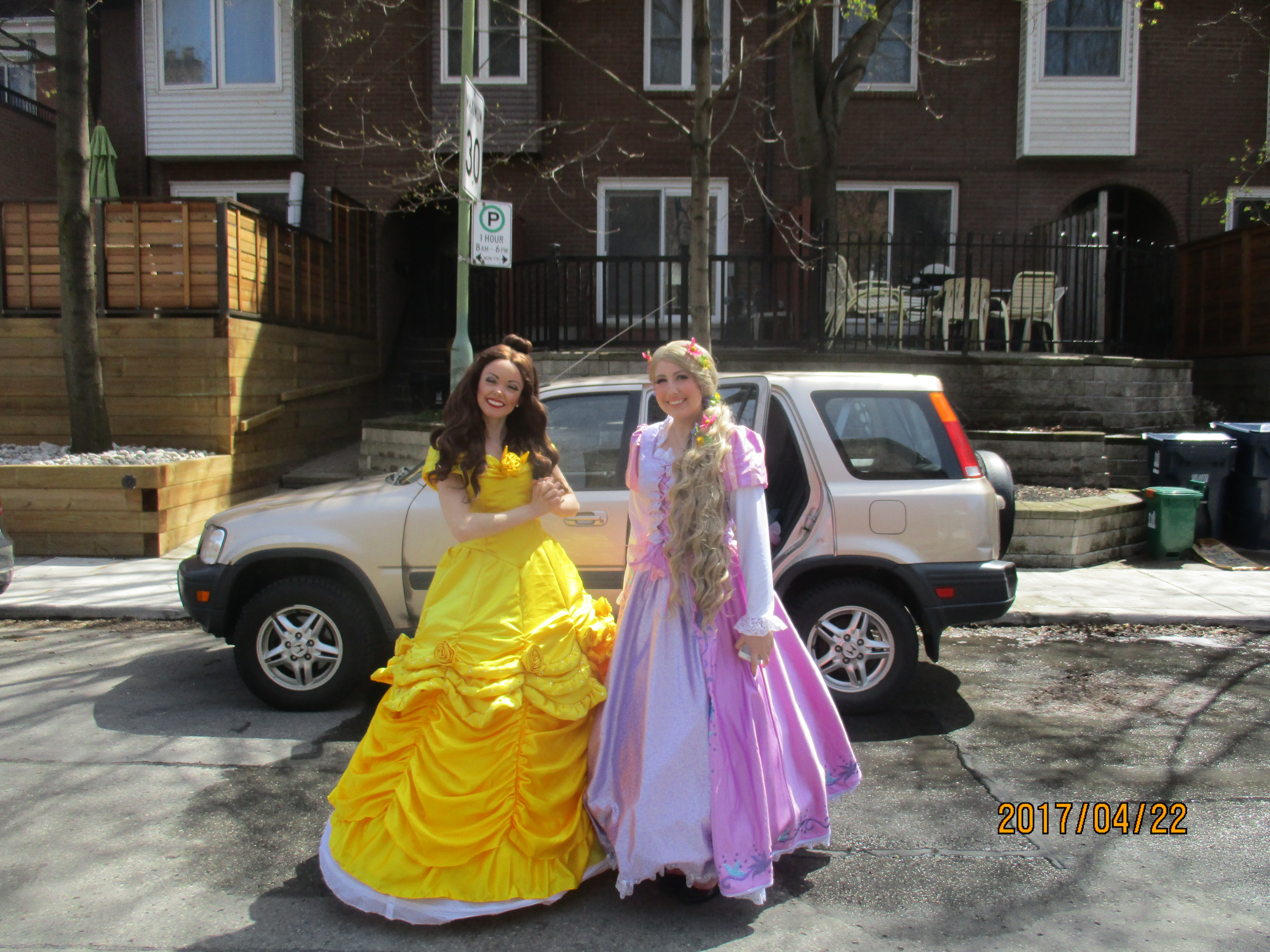
Belle and Rapunzel party princesses

A party princess is a person who entertains children at birthday parties, often dressed as different Disney characters especially those from the Disney Princess franchise. The most common party princess costumes are Elsa, Cinderella, Rapunzel, Aurora, Belle, and Ariel. These types of princess character entertainers are usually hired through children's birthday party entertainment planners. Party princesses generally perform at private birthday parties for young girls: they sing, dance, and play with kids as well as mingle with other guests, all the while maintaining a party theme based on the character they are dressed up as.

== Legal issues ==
Party princesses often resemble the princesses from animated Disney movies. The appearances are Disney's intellectual property, as distinct portrayals that fall under copyright (even if they originated in public domain fairy tales). Disney filed a lawsuit against a company in New York for unauthorized use of Star Wars characters. The federal court in New York refused to grant Disney summary judgement, and noted that the costumed character company's website referred to Princess Leia and Chewbacca as "The Princess" and "Big Hairy Guy". The judge ruled that there was no visible attempt at confusing customers about whether the company misrepresented Disney.
