= Donald Tang =

American businessman

- Born: 1963; Shanghai, China
- Education: California State Polytechnic University, Pomona
- Occupation: Businessman
- Title: Executive Chairman of Shein Group

Donald Tang is a Chinese-American billionaire businessman who serves as executive chairman of Shein Group, a global online on-demand fashion retailer. He is the former vice chairman of Bear Stearns and former chairman and CEO of Bear Stearns Asia. He also founded Tang Media Partners.

== Early life and education ==
Tang was born in Shanghai, China, where his parents were college professors. At the age of 18, in 1982, he followed his girlfriend Jean to Los Angeles after she and her family immigrated to America. After he arrived in Los Angeles, Jean and Donald married, and they both became U.S. citizens. Working in a series of restaurant jobs to finance his education, Tang graduated from California State Polytechnic University, Pomona, in 1986 with a chemical engineering degree.

== Career ==
=== Finance career ===
Tang's career in finance began at Merrill Lynch & Co. in 1987 on the institutional equity sales team, later moving to Lehman Brothers and concentrating on fixed income institutional sales. He joined Bear Stearns in 1992 in Los Angeles as senior managing director of investment banking. In 1993, he was appointed president and chief executive officer of Bear Stearns Asia and moved to its Hong Kong office, subsequently being named chairman of Bear Stearns Asia. From 1993 to 1999, he built up its Asian operations, opening offices in China and Singapore. While in Hong Kong, Tang was elected to the board of directors of Bear Stearns & Co. in 1997.

In March 1999, Tang moved to Chicago and managed the Bear Stearns Midwest Region. In 2001, he was elected vice chairman of the Bear Stearns board of directors. Later in 2001 he was transferred to Los Angeles, with a dual mandate to both manage its West Coast operations and, as chairman and CEO of Bear Stearns Asia, to supervise all activity in Asia. In 2003, Tang was appointed chairman and president of Bear Stearns International Holdings.

Tang advised an arm of the CITIC Group during its $1.15 billion acquisition of Nations Energy in Kazakhstan. He led the Bear Stearns team representing Hunan Valin Group, a Chinese steel company, when it sold a 37% stake to Mittal Steel Company (now ArcelorMittal) in what was then the largest acquisition by an international strategic investor of a Chinese-listed firm.

Under Tang's leadership, Bear Stearns Asia was the financial advisor to the telecommunications giant China Mobile and jointly led its secondary offering. Bear Stearns was the financial advisor and co-lead manager for the IPO of China Telecom. Bear Stearns Asia under Tang was also the financial advisor for Guangshen Railway Co Ltd., Beijing Yanhua Petrochemical Ltd., and Yanzhou Coal Mining Co Ltd., arranging financial transactions in their respective industries.

=== Career in media ===
In 2012, Tang facilitated the deal that resulted in Dalian Wanda, a leading Chinese conglomerate, acquiring AMC Entertainment Holdings for $2.6 billion.

In 2015, he founded Tang Media Productions (TMP), a media holding company based in Los Angeles and Shanghai. In June 2016, Tang Media Productions acquired majority ownership of the international film, television, and music production sales and distribution company IM Global, and announced a partnership involving IM Global and China's social media giant Tencent to form a new television production joint venture called IM Global TV. In 2017, Tang Media Partners purchased the U.S. motion picture distributor Open Road Films from AMC and Regal, and created Global Road Entertainment as an operating unit incorporating Open Road, IM Global, and IM Global TV.

=== Shein ===
In November 2022, Tang joined global online on-demand fashion retailer Shein Group as executive vice chairman, after having served as advisor to the company's CEO and cofounder Chris Xu (Sky Xu) for over a year.

As of August 2023, Tang is executive chairman of Shein Group. Under his stewardship, Shein and SPARC group entered into an agreement to expand Shein's retail reach.

== Board memberships ==
Tang is a former member of the boards of trustees of Los Angeles County Museum of Art (LACMA), California Institute of Technology, UCLA Medical Center, and RAND Corporation.

He is a former member of the board of councilors of USC Annenberg School for Communication and Journalism.
