= List of awards and nominations received by Elisabeth Moss =

Elisabeth Moss awards and nominations
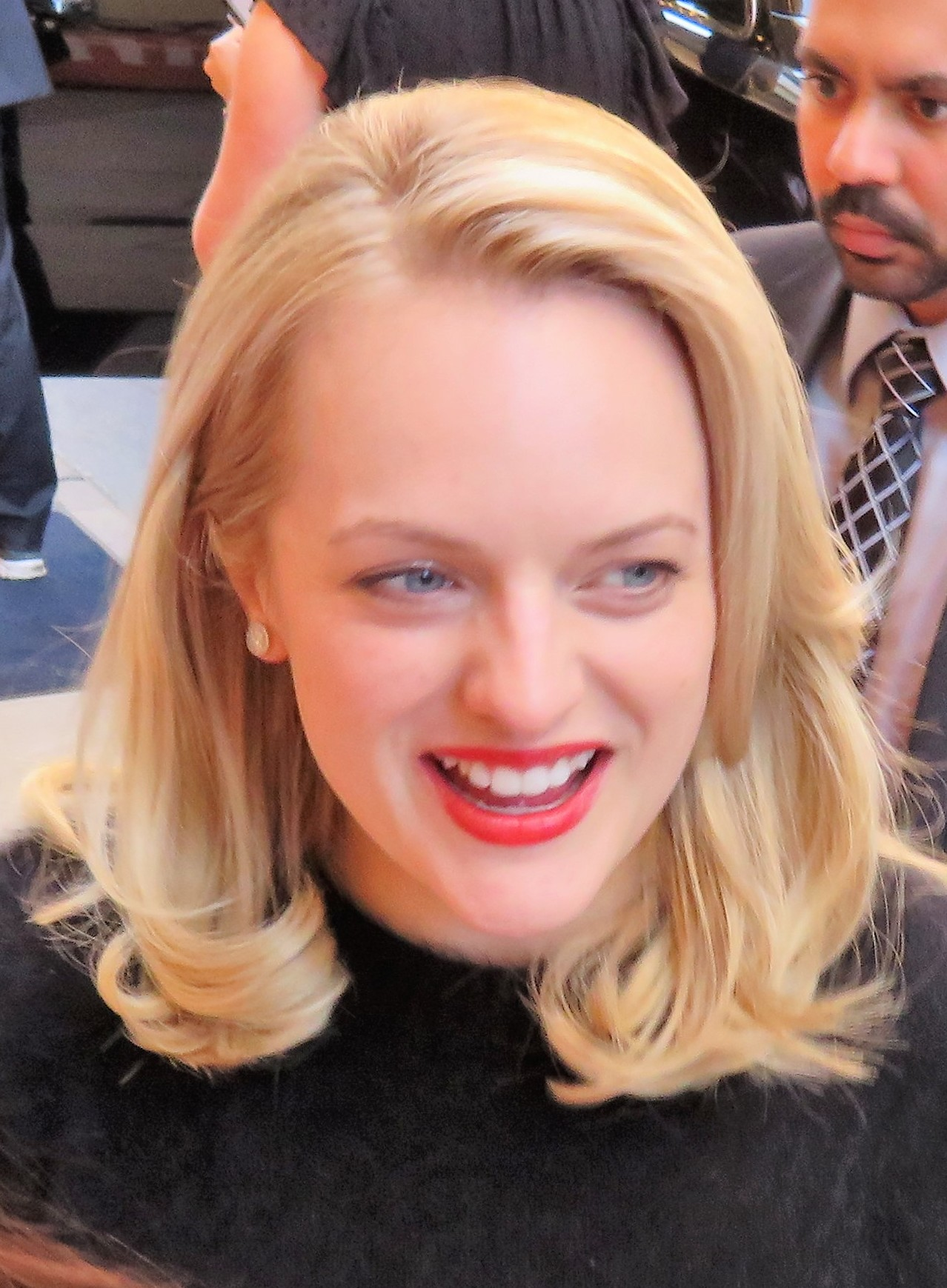
- Moss in 2017
Awards and nominations
Award	Wins	Nominations
Actor Awards	2	17
BAFTA Awards	0	1
Critics Choice Awards	2	6
Emmy Awards	2	15
Golden Globes	2	5
Tony Awards	1	1

Totals (Note: Certain award groups do not simply award one winner. They acknowledge several different recipients, have runners-up, and have third place. Since this is a specific recognition and is different from losing an award, runner-up mentions are considered wins in this award tally. For simplification and to avoid errors, each award in this list has been presumed to have had a prior nomination.)
- Wins: 12
- Nominations: 58

The following is a list of awards and nominations received by Elisabeth Moss.

Elisabeth Moss is an American actor known for her roles on stage and screen. She has received numerous awards for her performances on television, including two Primetime Emmy Awards, two Golden Globe Awards, two Critics' Choice Television Awards, and two Screen Actors Guild Awards as well as nominations for a British Academy Television Award and a Tony Award.

For her portrayal of Peggy Olson, the secretary turned copywriter in the AMC period drama series Mad Men (2007–2015), she received critical acclaim as well as nominations for six Primetime Emmy Awards (five for Outstanding Lead Actress in a Drama Series in 2009, 2011, 2012, 2013, and 2015, and one for Outstanding Supporting Actress in a Drama Series in 2010). She won the Screen Actors Guild Award for Outstanding Performance by an Ensemble in a Drama Series twice in 2008 and 2009 and was nominated for the Golden Globe Award for Best Actress – Television Series Drama in 2010 and three Critics' Choice Television Award for Best Actress in a Drama Series from 2011 to 2013.

She played a detective in the BBC Two / SundanceTV mystery miniseries Top of the Lake (2013) earning the Golden Globe Award for Best Actress – Miniseries or Television Film and the Critics' Choice Television Award for Best Actress in a Movie/Miniseries as well nominations for the Primetime Emmy Award for Outstanding Lead Actress in a Limited or Anthology Series or Movie and the Screen Actors Guild Award for Outstanding Actress in a Miniseries or TV Movie. She later played June Osborne in the Hulu dystopian drama series The Handmaids Tale (2017–2025), earning the Primetime Emmy Award for Outstanding Lead Actress in a Drama Series, the Golden Globe Award for Best Actress – Television Series Drama, and the Critics' Choice Television Award for Best Actress in a Drama Series as well as nominations for eight Screen Actors Guild Awards.

On film, she has played various roles including teenager who endured a sexual assault in Virgin (2003), and a fictional rock star in Her Smell (2018), both of which earned her nominations for the Independent Spirit Award for Best Female Lead. On stage, she starred in the Broadway revival of the Wendy Wasserstein play The Heidi Chronicles (2015) for which she earned a nomination for the Tony Award for Best Actress in a Play.

== Major associations ==
=== Actor Awards ===
Year	Category	Nominated work	Result	Ref.
2007	Outstanding Ensemble in a Drama Series	Mad Men (season 1)	Nominated	
2008	Outstanding Female Actor in a Drama Series	Mad Men (season 2)	Nominated	
2008	Outstanding Ensemble in a Drama Series	Mad Men (season 2)	Won	
2009	Outstanding Ensemble in a Drama Series	Mad Men (season 3)	Won	
2010	Outstanding Female Actor in a Drama Series	Mad Men (season 4)	Nominated	
2010	Outstanding Ensemble in a Drama Series	Mad Men (season 4)	Nominated	
2011	Outstanding Ensemble in a Drama Series	Mad Men (season 5)	Nominated	
2013	Outstanding Female Actor in a Miniseries or TV Movie	Top of the Lake	Nominated	
2015	Outstanding Ensemble in a Drama Series	Mad Men (season 7)	Nominated	
2017	Outstanding Ensemble in a Drama Series	The Handmaid's Tale (Season 1)	Nominated	
2017	Outstanding Female Actor in a Drama Series	The Handmaid's Tale (Season 1)	Nominated	
2018	Outstanding Female Actor in a Drama Series	The Handmaid's Tale (Season 2)	Nominated	
2018	Outstanding Ensemble in a Drama Series	The Handmaid's Tale (Season 2)	Nominated	
2019	Outstanding Ensemble in a Drama Series	The Handmaid's Tale (Season 3)	Nominated	
2019	Outstanding Female Actor in a Drama Series	The Handmaid's Tale (Season 3)	Nominated	
2021	Outstanding Female Actor in a Drama Series	The Handmaid's Tale (Season 4)	Nominated	
2021	Outstanding Ensemble in a Drama Series	The Handmaid's Tale (Season 4)	Nominated	

=== BAFTA Awards ===
Year	Category	Nominated work	Result	Ref.
British Academy Television Awards
2019	Best International Programme	The Handmaid’s Tale	Nominated	

=== Critics' Choice Awards ===
Year	Category	Nominated work	Result	Ref.
Critics' Choice Television Awards
2011	Best Actress in a Drama Series	Mad Men	Nominated	
2012	Best Actress in a Drama Series	Mad Men	Nominated	
2013	Best Actress in a Drama Series	Mad Men	Nominated	
2013	Best Actress in a Movie/Miniseries	Top of the Lake	Won	
2018	Best Actress in a Drama Series	The Handmaid's Tale	Won	
2019	Best Actress in a Drama Series	The Handmaid's Tale	Nominated	

=== Emmy Awards ===
Year	Category	Nominated work	Result	Ref.
Primetime Emmy Awards
2009	Outstanding Lead Actress in a Drama Series	Mad Men (episode: "Meditations in an Emergency")	Nominated	
2010	Outstanding Supporting Actress in a Drama Series	Mad Men (episode: ""Love Among the Ruins")	Nominated	
2011	Outstanding Lead Actress in a Drama Series	Mad Men (episode: "The Suitcase")	Nominated	
2012	Outstanding Lead Actress in a Drama Series	Mad Men (episode: "The Other Woman")	Nominated	
2013	Outstanding Lead Actress in a Drama Series	Mad Men (episode: "The Better Half")	Nominated	
2013	Outstanding Lead Actress in a Limited Series or Movie	Top of the Lake	Nominated	
2015	Outstanding Lead Actress in a Drama Series	Mad Men (episode: "Person to Person")	Nominated	
2017	Outstanding Drama Series (Note: As producer)	The Handmaid's Tale (Season 1)	Won	
2017	Outstanding Lead Actress in a Drama Series	The Handmaid's Tale (episode: "Night")	Won	
2018	Outstanding Drama Series	The Handmaid's Tale (Season 2)	Nominated	
2018	Outstanding Lead Actress in a Drama Series	The Handmaid's Tale (episode: "The Last Ceremony")	Nominated	
2020	Outstanding Drama Series	The Handmaid's Tale (Season 3)	Nominated	
2021	Outstanding Drama Series	The Handmaid's Tale (Season 4)	Nominated	
2021	Outstanding Lead Actress in a Drama Series	The Handmaid's Tale (episode: "Home")	Nominated	
2023	Outstanding Lead Actress in a Drama Series	The Handmaid's Tale (episode: "Safe")	Nominated	

=== Golden Globe Awards ===
Year	Category	Nominated work	Result	Ref.
2010	Best Actress – Television Series Drama	Mad Men (season 3)	Nominated	
2013	Best Actress – Miniseries or Television Film	Top of the Lake	Won	
2017	Best Actress – Television Series Drama	The Handmaid's Tale (Season 1)	Won	
2018	Best Actress – Television Series Drama	The Handmaid's Tale (Season 2)	Nominated	
2021	Best Actress – Television Series Drama	The Handmaid's Tale (Season 4)	Nominated	

=== Tony Awards ===
Year	Category	Nominated work	Result	Ref.
2015	Best Actress in a Play	The Heidi Chronicles	Nominated	

== Miscellaneous accolades ==
Association	Year	Category	Nominated work	Result	Ref.
Australian Academy of Cinema and Television Arts	2017	Best Lead Actress in a Television Drama	Top of the Lake	Won	
Australian Academy of Cinema and Television Arts	2020	Best Actress in a Leading Role	The Invisible Man	Nominated	
ASTRA Awards	2014	Most Outstanding Performance by an Actor – Female	Top of the Lake	Nominated	
Dorian Awards	2011	TV Drama Performance of the Year	Mad Men	Nominated	
Dorian Awards	2018	TV Performance of the Year – Actress	The Handmaid's Tale	Nominated	
Drama League Award	2015	Distinguished Performance	The Heidi Chronicles	Nominated	
Empire Awards	2018	Best Actress in a TV Series	The Handmaid's Tale	Nominated	
Hollywood Critics Association	2020	Best Actress	The Invisible Man	Won	
Hollywood Critics Association	2020	Best Actress	Shirley	Nominated	
Independent Spirit Awards	2003	Best Female Lead	Virgin	Nominated	
Independent Spirit Awards	2019	Best Female Lead	Her Smell	Nominated	
Monte-Carlo Television Festival	2010	Outstanding Actress – Drama Series	Mad Men	Nominated	
Monte-Carlo Television Festival	2011	Outstanding Actress – Drama Series	Mad Men	Nominated	
Monte-Carlo Television Festival	2014	Outstanding Actress in a Mini-Series	Top of the Lake	Won	
Satellite Awards	2009	Best Actress – Television Series Drama	Mad Men	Nominated	
Satellite Awards	2010	Best Supporting Actress – Series, Miniseries or Television Film	Mad Men	Nominated	
Satellite Awards	2013	Best Actress – Miniseries or Television Film	Top of the Lake	Won	
Satellite Awards	2018	Best Actress – Miniseries or Television Film	Top of the Lake: China Girl	Nominated	
Satellite Awards	2018	Best Actress – Television Series Drama	The Handmaid's Tale	Won	
Satellite Awards	2019	Best Actress in a Drama / Genre Series	The Handmaid's Tale	Nominated	
Young Artist Awards	2001	Best Guest Actress in a TV Drama Series	The West Wing	Nominated	
