= Max Minghella =

British actor (born 1985)

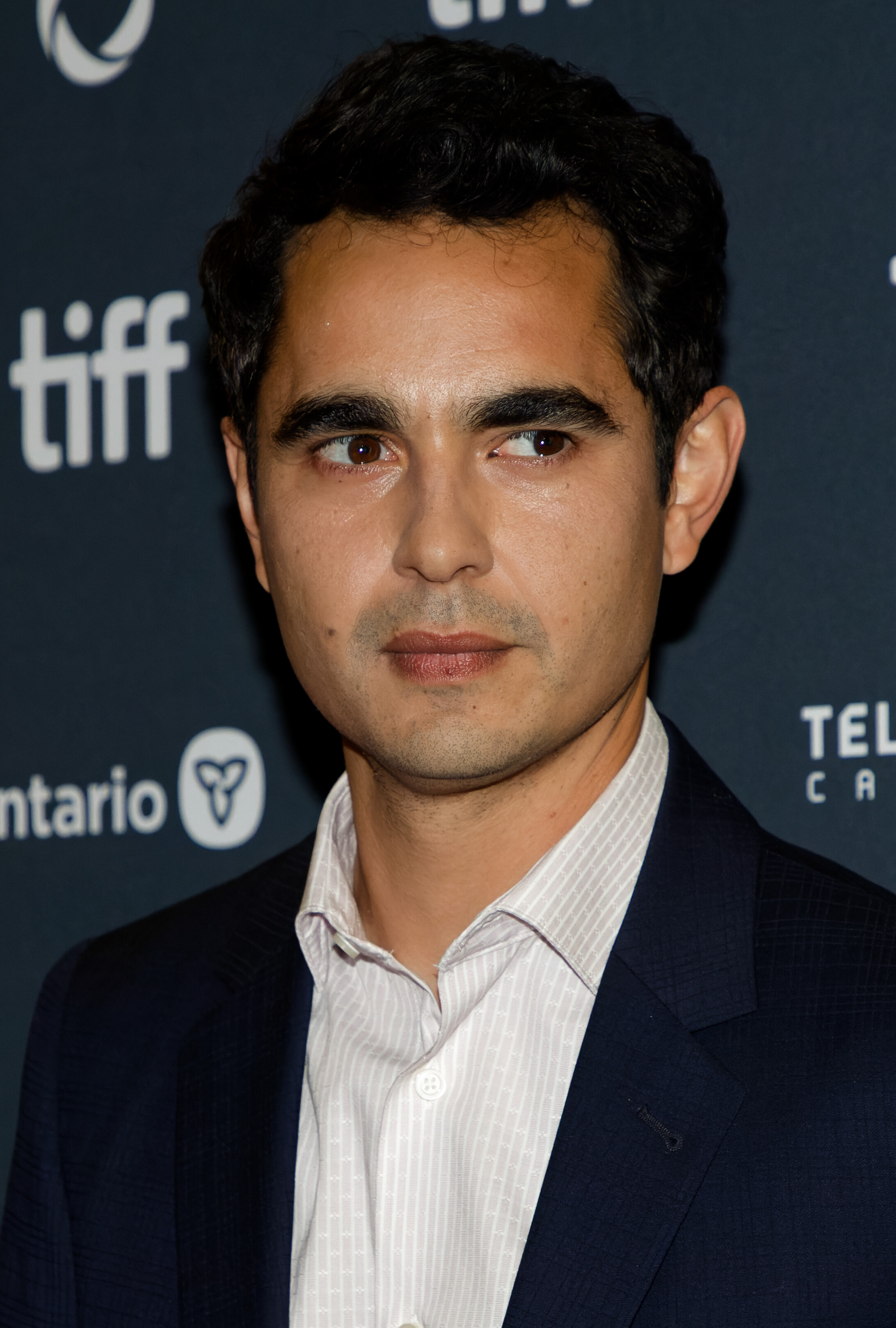
- Minghella in 2024
- Born: Max Giorgio Choa Minghella; 16 September 1985 (age 41); London, England
- Education: Columbia University (BA)
- Occupation: Actor
- Years active: 1999–present
- Father: Anthony Minghella
- Relatives: Loretta Minghella (aunt); Dominic Minghella (uncle); Robert Kotewall (great-grandfather); Emanuel Raphael Belilios (great-great-grandfather)

Max Giorgio Choa Minghella (born 16 September 1985) is an English actor and director. He is known for his roles in the films Syriana (2005), The Social Network (2010), The Ides of March (2011), Spiral (2021) and Babylon (2022) as well as his role as Nick Blaine in the television series The Handmaid's Tale (2017–2025), which earned him a nomination for a Primetime Emmy Award.

Minghella's directing credits include the musical drama Teen Spirit (2019), Shell (2024) and television series The Shards (2026).

== Early life and education ==
Minghella was born in Hampstead, London, the son of director Anthony Minghella and dancer and choreographer Carolyn Jane Choa.

Minghella's father was born in Ryde on the Isle of Wight, and was of Italian descent. His mother, who was from Hong Kong, is from a family of multiple heritage. His maternal grandfather George Choa was of three-quarters Chinese and one-quarter Jewish descent, and his maternal grandmother Maisie Nora (née Kotewall) was of Indian Parsi, English, Irish, Swedish and Chinese ancestry. While Minghella was growing up he spent time on his father's film sets. He has said that he has "fond memories" of them and that he felt "no pressure" from his father to succeed in the entertainment industry. He was educated at St Anthony's Preparatory School and University College School in Hampstead. He then attended Columbia University, which he considered his "first priority", and studied history, graduating in 2009. He was a resident of John Jay Hall during his studies at Columbia. He typically worked on films only during his summer breaks. He has said that he felt like "an English boy at an American school", that he kept to himself, and that most of his fellow students did not know that he was an actor.

Minghella was inspired to become an actor during his teenage years, after seeing a production of the play This Is Our Youth in London's West End; he subsequently dropped out of the University College School to pursue an acting career, and attended the National Youth Theatre.

== Career ==
=== 2005–2009 ===
Minghella's first professional role was in Fox Searchlight's Bee Season, playing the son of a dysfunctional Jewish American family. The film was released in November 2005 to mostly mixed reviews and low box office, grossing only $1 million in its limited release. One critic who rated the film "7 out of 10" remarked that Minghella was "a talented young actor to watch, delivering a strong performance".

Minghella's other November 2005 role was the political thriller Syriana, in which he played the son of George Clooney's CIA agent character. In 2006, he starred in the Daniel Clowes adaptation Art School Confidential, a comedy directed by Terry Zwigoff. He got the part after meeting Zwigoff when he visited the set of Bee Season. He starred alongside Blake Lively in Elvis and Anabelle, a dark romantic drama in which he plays an undertaker's son. The film premiered at the South by Southwest film festival in 2007. He described it as "a really sweet film". He was to play Art Bechstein in the film version of writer Michael Chabon's novel The Mysteries of Pittsburgh, but dropped out of the project due to his university schedule.

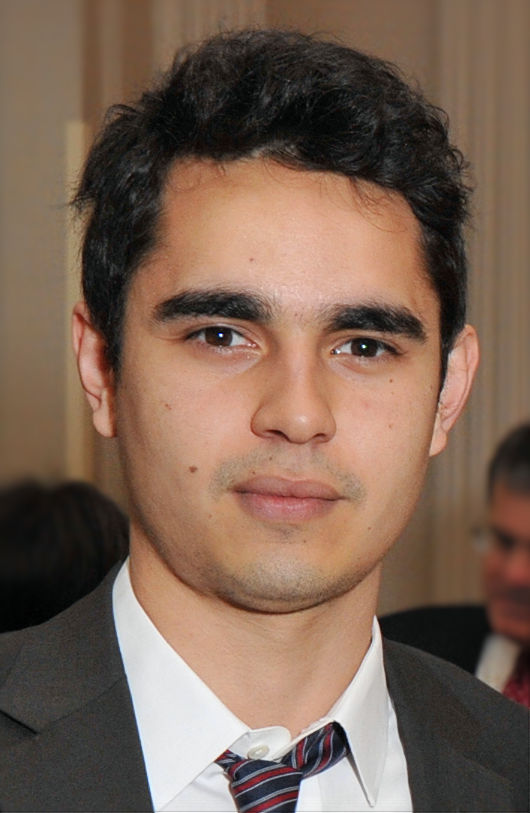
Minghella in 2010

The press reported in 2007 that Minghella was cast alongside Cillian Murphy and Sienna Miller in Beeban Kidron's Hippie Hippie Shake, a film about writer Richard Neville set in 1960s London.

In 2008, Minghella played a film director in How to Lose Friends & Alienate People and was seen in a segment of the dark comedy Brief Interviews with Hideous Men.

In March 2008, it was announced that he would star with Rachel Weisz in Alejandro Amenábar's second English language film, Agora. The film is set in 4th century Egypt and revolves around Hypatia of Alexandria. Agora premiered at the Cannes Film Festival in May 2009. It became Spain's highest grossing film of the year, earning over $10.3 million within four days of release.

=== 2010–2016 ===
In David Fincher's The Social Network, the 2010 film about the origins of Facebook, he plays Divya Narendra, one of the Harvard upperclassmen who sues Mark Zuckerberg for stealing the idea behind Facebook.

In June 2010, Minghella was cast in the science-fiction film The Darkest Hour, released in December 2011. He appeared in the ensemble dramedy 10 Years (2012). In June 2012, he joined the cast of the Shawn Levy comedy The Internship.

In November 2013, it was announced that Minghella would be playing Richie Castellano in the second season of the Fox sitcom The Mindy Project.

In 2013, he appeared in the music video for "Shot at the Night" by The Killers. The video has amassed over 140 million views on popular streaming site YouTube.

In 2014, Minghella served as executive producer on a film adaptation of Patricia Highsmith's The Two Faces of January. The following year, he wrote and produced an adaptation of Liz Jensen's novel The 9th Life of Louis Drax directed by Alexandre Aja. Minghella and Aja previously collaborated on the 2013 film Horns.

In 2015, he appeared opposite Dakota Johnson in the Vogue short film "Just a Minute"

=== 2017–2024 ===
Minghella played the role of Nick Blaine, an Eye in the Republic of Gilead and the love interest of June Osborne, in the Hulu dystopian series The Handmaid's Tale from 2017 to 2025. He was nominated for a Primetime Emmy Award for Outstanding Supporting Actor in a Drama Series for the role in 2021.

Minghella made his directorial debut with 2018's Teen Spirit, a musical, from his own screenplay. The film starring Elle Fanning, Zlatko Burić and Rebecca Hall premiered at the Toronto International Film Festival and South by Southwest in 2019. The soundtrack was released by Interscope Records featuring performances of and music written by Robyn, Ellie Goulding, Ariana Grande, Katy Perry, Tegan & Sara, Annie Lennox, Orbital, Alice Deejay, The Undertones, Major Lazer, Grimes, Whigfield, and Sigrid, and an original song "Wildflowers" written by Carly Rae Jepsen and produced by Jack Antonoff.

Minghella starred in Spiral, a spin-off from and ninth installment of the Saw film series. He played a rookie cop who teams up with Chris Rock's veteran detective to track down a Jigsaw copycat. The film was released on May 14th 2021 and remained number one at the box office for two consecutive weeks.

Minghella portrayed Irving Thalberg in the 2022 film Babylon.

In 2024, Minghella directed the body horror satire Shell starring Elisabeth Moss, Kate Hudson and Kaia Gerber. The film was released by Republic Pictures in October 2025 following its premiere at the Toronto International Film Festival.

=== 2025–present ===
In 2025, Minghella joined the cast of the HBO financial drama Industry in its fourth season as a series regular, playing enigmatic fintech CFO Whitney Halberstram. The season premiered in January 2026. Minghella received critical acclaim for his role, with Liam Gaughan of Collider calling it a "magnetic, unnerving performance". Ben Travers of IndieWire named him the "MVP" of the season.

In August 2025, it was announced Minghella would be joining the cast of DC Studios body horror film Clayface. He portrays John Borrelli, a Gotham City Police Detective and love interest to Naomi Ackie's character. The film was released on October 2026.

Minghella is reported to be directing episodes of the upcoming television series The Shards based on the novel by Bret Easton Ellis. In May 2026, Deadline announced Minghella has been cast in the fourth season of The White Lotus.

== Personal life ==
Minghella was in a relationship with The Misshapes DJ Leigh Lezark from 2006 to 2008. Minghella dated actress Kate Mara from 2010 to 2014. In 2015, Minghella was linked to Irish actress Eve Hewson. In 2018, he reportedly began a relationship with actress Elle Fanning, whom he directed in Teen Spirit. They separated in 2023 after several years together.

== Filmography ==
=== Film ===
List of films and roles
| Year | Title | Role | Notes |
|---|---|---|---|
| 1999 | Toy Boys | Danny | Short film |
| 1999 | Let the Good Times Roll | Boy with dog | Short film |
| 2003 | Cold Mountain | Extra | Uncredited |
| 2005 | Bee Season | Aaron Naumann | |
| 2005 | Syriana | Robby Barnes | |
| 2006 | Art School Confidential | Jerome Platz | |
| 2007 | Elvis and Anabelle | Elvis | |
| 2008 | How to Lose Friends & Alienate People | Vincent Lepak | |
| 2009 | Brief Interviews with Hideous Men | Kevin (Subject No. 28) | |
| 2009 | Agora | Davus | |
| 2010 | The Social Network | Divya Narendra | Hollywood Film Festival for Ensemble of the Year; Palm Springs International Film Festival Ensemble Cast Award; Phoenix Film Critics Society Award for Best Cast; Nominated—Central Ohio Film Critics Association for Best Ensemble; Nominated—San Diego Film Critics Society Award for Best Performance by an Ensemble; Nominated—Screen Actors Guild Award for Outstanding Performance by a Cast in a Motion Picture; Nominated—Washington D.C. Area Film Critics Association Award for Best Ensemble |
| 2011 | The Ides of March | Ben Harpen | Nominated—Central Ohio Film Critics Association for Best Ensemble |
| 2011 | 10 Years | AJ | |
| 2011 | The Darkest Hour | Ben | |
| 2013 | The Internship | Graham Hawtrey | |
| 2013 | Horns | Lee Tourneau | |
| 2014 | About Alex | Isaac | |
| 2014 | Not Safe for Work | Thomas Miller | |
| 2015 | Into the Forest | Eli | |
| 2015 | Just a Minute | The Voice | Short film |
| 2016 | The 9th Life of Louis Drax | Nurse | Uncredited; also screenwriter and producer |
| 2016 | Fluffy | Mark Mason | Short film |
| 2018 | Teen Spirit | —N/a | Director and screenwriter |
| 2021 | Spiral | William Schenk / William Emmerson | |
| 2022 | Babylon | Irving Thalberg | Nominated—Screen Actors Guild Award for Outstanding Performance by a Cast in a Motion Picture |
| 2023 | Maximum Truth | Antonio Kelly-Zhang | |
| 2024 | Shell | —N/a | Director |
| 2026 | Clayface | John Borelli | |

=== Television ===
List of television appearances and roles
| Year | Title | Role | Notes |
|---|---|---|---|
| 2013–2017 | The Mindy Project | Richie Castellano | 8 episodes |
| 2017–2025 | The Handmaid's Tale | Nick Blaine | Main role Nominated—Primetime Emmy Award for Outstanding Supporting Actor in a Drama Series (2021); Nominated—Screen Actors Guild Award for Outstanding Performance by an Ensemble in a Drama Series (2018–19, 2022) |
| 2026 | Industry | Whitney Halberstram | Season 4 |
| 2026 | The Shards | —N/a | Director; 2 episodes |
| TBA | The White Lotus † | TBA | Season 4 |
