= List of The Handmaid's Tale characters =

List of The Handmaid's Tale characters may refer to:

- The Handmaid's Tale#Characters, a list of characters from the novel
- List of The Handmaid's Tale (TV series) characters, a list of characters from the TV series
