= Shell (2024 film) =

2024 film by Max Minghella

- Theatrical release poster
- Directed by: Max Minghella
- Written by: Jack Stanley
- Produced by: Fred Berger; Brian Kavanaugh-Jones; Max Minghella; Elisabeth Moss; Lindsay McManus; Hal Sadoff; Norman Golightly; Alicia Van Couvering
- Starring: Elisabeth Moss; Kate Hudson; Arian Moayed; Este Haim; Elizabeth Berkley; Kaia Gerber
- Cinematography: Drew Daniels
- Edited by: Gardner Gould
- Music by: Eldad Guetta
- Production companies: Range; Blank Tape; Love & Squalor Pictures; Dark Castle Entertainment
- Distributed by: Republic Pictures
- Release dates: September 12, 2024 (TIFF); October 3, 2025 (United States)
- Running time: 101 minutes
- Country: United States
- Language: English
- Box office: $234,446

Shell is a 2024 American black comedy body horror film directed by Max Minghella, written by Jack Stanley, and starring Elisabeth Moss, Kate Hudson, Arian Moayed, Este Haim, Elizabeth Berkley, and Kaia Gerber.

The film had its world premiere at the Toronto International Film Festival on September 12, 2024, and was released in the United States on October 3, 2025, by Republic Pictures.

== Plot ==
One night, actress Jenna Janero lies in her bathtub cutting enormous moles off her skin while talking to somebody on the telephone in a frightened tone. She hears a noise and leaves her bathroom to investigate before being murdered by an unseen attacker.

Actress Samantha "Sam" Lake, formerly relevant for a lead role in television, struggles to secure roles and date as she faces ageism and bodyshaming. Young actress Chloe Benson, whom she used to babysit, recognizes and greets her warmly during a casting audition. A producer urges Sam to undergo a rejuvenating procedure at Shell, a beauty company that mostly serves celebrities using genetic technology. Sam arrives at the clinic but is about to walk out on her appointment before Dr. Hubert, a scientist employed by Shell, gently reassures her. As she waits to be called, Chloe encounters Sam again and encourages her to undergo the procedure.

Sam comes out of the procedure successfully, her younger appearance giving her confidence and landing her an invitation for a Christmas party hosted by Shell's CEO Zoe Shannon who befriends her. Initially starstruck, Sam is taken aback when Zoe serves her own shed skin for dinner, but appreciates the new friendship.

Three months later, Sam has landed a coveted role, her dating life and friendship with Zoe thrive, and she has employed her best friend Lydia as her personal assistant, who notices a tiny mole in her neck which prompts her to return to the clinic, where Hubert removes it and calls it a minor side effect. Two detectives, Flores and Abramson, stop by Sam's new place as Chloe is missing since Sam last saw her. She also learns that Hubert has been fired from Shell. One night, she receives a call from Chloe who warns her that "they" are always watching.

Sam finds more moles on her leg and vomits black bile on a co-star and a journalist while filming before Zoe arrives, taking her to her mansion. While Zoe is in the kitchen, Sam sneaks into the bathroom to make a call. A suspicious Zoe, bringing tea, demands to see her call log, not wanting Sam to expose her side effects. Sam throws the hot tea on Zoe's face and escapes her driver and henchman Cornelius. Rescued by Lydia, who had followed her, they drive to a diner to meet with Flores and Abramson. Sam plays her bracelet cellphone recording of the conversation with Zoe, but the detectives claim the recording is illegal and inadmissible; Sam suspects that they work for Zoe.

As Sam flees in an automated taxi, the detectives chase her until they are hit by a truck. Sam goes to Dr. Hubert's place and he cures her worsening skin condition. In the morning, Sam finds Chloe's medication in the bathroom and confronts him. Hubert explains that he and Chloe were together when her own condition worsened. Sam suspects that she is in the house and finds a room where she is locked, transformed into a feral creature. She returns to find Hubert stabbed to death by Cornelius, who subdues and kidnaps her.

Sam awakens in a secret part of Shell's headquarters before Zoe's lawyer Chan and lead scientist Dr. Brand, who had developed the genetic technology for the procedures and explains to Sam the possible side effects. Zoe pressures Sam to accept a deal to buy her silence; Sam refuses and demands Chloe's freedom. A truck appears bringing Chloe transformed into a gigantic lobster, before she breaks out of her glass cage and kills Chan and Brand. Sam hides and finds Lydia. Cornelius intercepts them but is killed by Chloe. Both women hide in a laboratory, where Zoe follows them, confessing to have secured Sam's recent role out of pity. Chloe appears and spares Sam. Zoe locks herself into a glass chamber and Chloe bangs the computer which triggers the procedure, causing Zoe to explode as Sam watches.

Some time later, Sam has published a book denouncing Shell's actions, despite the company still operating and thriving. Her career receives renewed attention and she is happy with her social life, including her friendship with Lydia.

== Cast ==
- Elisabeth Moss as Samantha Lake
- Kate Hudson as Zoe Shannon
- Arian Moayed as Dr. Hubert
- Este Haim as Lydia
- Elizabeth Berkley as Jenna Janero
- Kaia Gerber as Chloe Benson
- Amy Landecker as Detective Flores
- Lionel Boyce as Detective Abramson
- Peter MacNicol as Dr. Thaddeus Brand
- Randall Park as Randolph Chan
- Ziwe as Audrey
- Brandon Keener as Brett
- Blake Lee as Sebastian
- Luke Samuels as Cornelius
- Dustin Milligan as Devin
- Spencer Neville as Tyler
- Ben Smith-Petersen as Chad

In addition, Peri Gilpin has a cameo appearance as Samantha's sitcom co-star, and the film's producer, Marty Bowen plays a producer at the audition with Mary Lynn Rajskub as a casting director.

== Production ==
=== Development ===
Writer Jack Stanley completed the first draft of the screenplay in 2018. Director Max Minghella was reportedly taken by the "imaginative, quite abstract" script, even if it contained elements he didn't expect to resonate with him like body horror and bold imagery. "It wasn't in its DNA, something that I normally associate with my taste, and yet, there was something about it that I found deeply memorable, and it really sort of stayed with me,” he stated. Minghella produced his own draft and then re-wrote it with Stanley, "evolving it into his vision of the movies he loved as a kid".

In July 2020, it was announced Minghella would direct the film from Stanley's script, with Fred Berger, Brian Kavanaugh, and Alicia Van Couvering producing. HBO Max was set to produce and distribute the film. However, several delays due to the COVID-19 pandemic slowed down the project's development.

In May 2023, Elisabeth Moss, Kate Hudson and Kaia Gerber joined the cast of the film, with Moss set to produce under her Love & Squalor Pictures banner, and HBO Max no longer attached. Production was delayed again by the 2023 SAG-AFTRA strike but key cast & crew members confirmed their commitment to work on the film as soon as the strike was resolved. In February 2024, Arian Moayed, Lionel Boyce, Este Haim, Ziwe Fumudoh, Peter MacNicol, Blake Lee, Dustin Milligan, Peri Gilpin and Mary Lynn Rajskub were announced to be cast in the film with Dark Castle Entertainment boarding on as a financer and co-producer, when shooting had just wrapped. On March 24, at the Academy Museum's special screening of Showgirls, Elizabeth Berkley announced she had recently completed a role in an undisclosed film project. The TIFF's official program, published on August 13, revealed that the film was Shell.

=== Filming ===
Principal photography began in Los Angeles on December 11, 2023, and wrapped on February 2, 2024, the day Berkley filmed her cameo in the film's opening scene. Minghella described the 25-day production schedule "incredibly challenging" due to the limited time available to film the movie. Moss became pregnant a few months before the start of filming and told Minghella that she could no longer make the film. In order not to lose the lead actress, Minghella adapted the screenplay so that Moss could shoot the film even though she was in her fifth and sixth month of pregnancy.

== Release ==
On August 30, 2024, Minghella introduced a 35mm screening of Showgirls at Vidiots, in Los Angeles, along with Berkley. Before the screening, he presented a sneak preview of the opening sequence of Shell.

Shell had its world premiere at the Toronto International Film Festival on September 12, 2024, and its U.S. premiere on August 17, 2025, at the Popcorn Frights Film Festival in Fort Lauderdale, Florida. It later won the "Best U.S. Feature" at the Horrorfest in Utah in September 2025.

The film was released in select theaters and on digital platforms in the United States on October 3, 2025, by Republic Pictures.

== Reception ==
=== Critical response ===
On the review aggregator website Rotten Tomatoes, 63% of 46 critics' reviews are positive, with an average rating of 5.7/10. Metacritic, which uses a weighted average, assigned the film a score of 55 out of 100, based on 6 critics, indicating "mixed or average" reviews.

The film opened at the 2024 Toronto International Film Festival to mixed reviews from critics, who noted the similarities with Coralie Fargeat's The Substance, also on the festival lineup.

IndieWire described Fargeat's film as "better and more outrageous" than Shell, but appreciated the latter film's final twist: "When it accepts its destiny as a ‘50s-style rubber-suit sci-fi monster movie, Shell does have camp value to it." Bloody Disgusting, in a more positive review, acknowledged the apparent similarity between Shell and The Substance but pointed out that, in the end, "yet they couldn't be further removed in just about every way." The Hollywood Reporter highlighted the effectiveness of the film's creepy elements: "The body horror aspects are among the most interesting, injecting the film with a nice dose of violence."

For TheWrap, the two main issues of the film were the pacing ("there's something uniquely silly about Shell near the end, but it takes quite a while to get there") and the lack of boldness ("is merely a fine film that's far too tame to completely pay off").

In a positive review, RogerEbert.com praised the film: "The entertainment business satire elements hit the mark, the twists are solid, and Minghella harnesses a creeping sense of spiraling dread with real skill." The lead performances were also appreciated: "Elisabeth Moss puts it all out there in the leading role, working up a sparky chemistry with Kate Hudson in the picture's Goop Gwyneth role".
