= Elisabeth Moss =

American actor (born 1982)

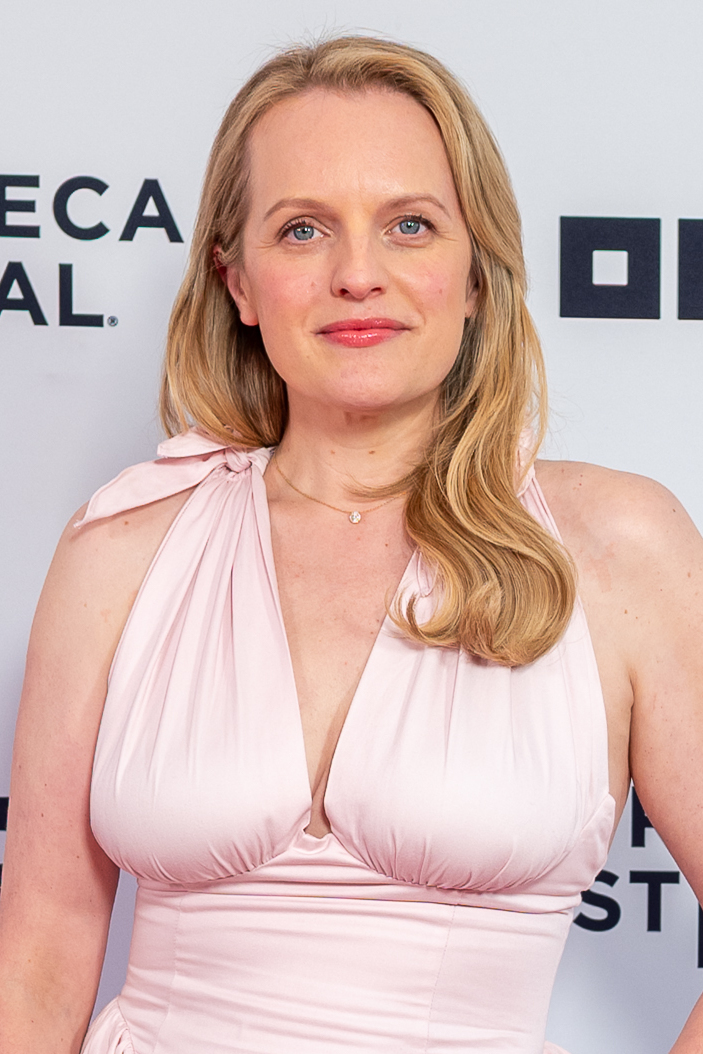
- Moss in 2026
- Born: Elisabeth Singleton Moss; July 24, 1982 (age 44); Los Angeles, California, U.S.
- Citizenship: United States; United Kingdom
- Occupations: Actor; director; producer
- Years active: 1990–present
- Spouse: Fred Armisen (m. 2009; div. 2011)
- Children: 1
- Awards: Full list

Elisabeth Singleton Moss (born July 24, 1982) is an American actor, director, and producer. She has received several accolades, including two Golden Globe Awards and two Primetime Emmy Awards as well as nominations for a BAFTA Award and a Tony Award.

Moss began acting in the early 1990s as a child actress and later received attention for playing Zoey Bartlet in the NBC political drama series The West Wing (1999–2006). She became known for portraying Peggy Olson in the AMC period drama series Mad Men (2007–2015) and June Osborne in the Hulu dystopian drama series The Handmaid's Tale (2017–2025), the later of which earned her the Primetime Emmy Award for Outstanding Lead Actress in a Drama Series. She has also starred in the BBC miniseries Top of the Lake (2013), the Apple TV+ science-fiction drama series Shining Girls (2022), the FX on Hulu thriller series The Veil (2024), and the Apple TV+ thriller series Imperfect Women (2026).

In film, Moss has held include supporting roles in Girl, Interrupted (1999), The Seagull (2018), Us (2019), and The French Dispatch (2021), and starring roles in Virgin (2003), The One I Love (2014), The Square (2017), The Invisible Man (2020), and Shirley (2020). She has also starred in three films by Alex Ross Perry: Listen Up Philip (2014), Queen of Earth (2016), and Her Smell (2018).

On stage, Moss made her Broadway debut playing a secretary in the revival of the David Mamet play Speed-the-Plow (2008). She returned to Broadway playing the title role in the Wendy Wasserstein play revival The Heidi Chronicles (2015), for which she earned a Tony Award for Best Actress in a Play nomination. She made her West End debut in a production of Lillian Hellman's The Children's Hour (2011).

== Early life and education ==
Elisabeth Singleton Moss was born on July 24, 1982, in Los Angeles, California. She is the daughter of Ronald Charles Moss, an Englishman from Birmingham, England, and Linda Moss (née Ekstrom), an American of Swedish descent. Both of Moss's parents were musicians; her mother plays jazz and blues harmonica professionally. Moss has one younger brother. She was raised a Scientologist. Her godfather was musician Chick Corea, whose manager was her father. When she was five years old, she made an appearance as a ballerina in Corea's music video for "Eternal Child," alongside other prominent Scientologists such as Karen Black, John Travolta, and Al Jarreau.

Initially, Moss aspired to be a professional dancer. In her adolescence, she traveled to New York City to study ballet at the School of American Ballet, after which she studied with Suzanne Farrell at the Kennedy Center in Washington, D.C. She continued to study dance through her teenage years, but started getting acting roles as well. To manage her education and career, she began homeschooling, and graduated in 1999.

== Career ==
=== 1990s: Early roles and The West Wing ===
Moss's first screen role was in 1990, when she appeared in the NBC miniseries Lucky/Chances. From 1992 until 1995, she appeared as Cynthia Parks in seven episodes of the TV series Picket Fences. She provided the voice of Holly DeCarlo in the TV special Frosty Returns (1992) and Michelle in the animated film Once Upon a Forest (1993). She appeared in the television remake of the 1993 film Gypsy and played Harvey Keitel's younger daughter in the film Imaginary Crimes (1994). The following year, she appeared in the remake of the Walt Disney Pictures film Escape to Witch Mountain (1995) and played a young Ashley Judd in the biopic Love Can Build a Bridge (1995). She also had a supporting role in the drama Separate Lives (1995) opposite Jim Belushi and Linda Hamilton, and a minor part in the black comedy The Last Supper (1995).

Beginning in 1999, Moss played the recurring role of Zoey Bartlet in the White House television drama The West Wing, playing the daughter of President Josiah Bartlet (Martin Sheen) and First Lady Abbey Bartlet (Stockard Channing); she portrayed the character until the series finale in 2006. Her character became integral to the fourth season of the show; in a retrospective on the series The Atlantic noted: "Aaron Sorkin made [Moss] the centerpiece of the explosive fourth-season finale where he basically engineered the most insane cliffhanger possible. It required Zoey to be a bit of a pain with her fancy French boyfriend, but Moss always made her relatable, even when the plot required otherwise."

=== 2000s: Mad Men and Broadway debut ===
In 2002, Moss appeared in a commercial for Excedrin in which she directly addressed the audience about the medication's benefits for people who suffer from migraines. The spot proved enduringly popular and ran for several years, providing Moss with residual income as she struggled to make it as an actor. Moss appeared in Heart of America and three other films in 2004. That year, she made the film Virgin, for which she was nominated for an Independent Spirit Award. Moss also had a supporting part in Ron Howard's Western thriller The Missing (2003). Moss had a supporting role in the 2005–2006 horror series Invasion, and appeared in television again on a 2007 episode of Grey's Anatomy entitled "My Favorite Mistake".

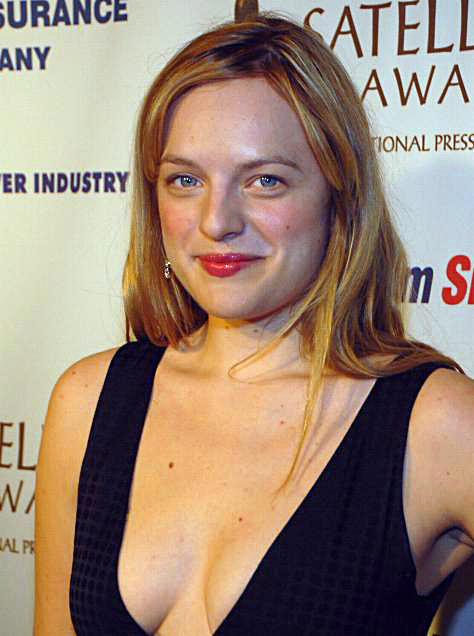
Moss at the 12th Satellite Awards in December 2007

From 2007 to 2015, she portrayed Peggy Olson, a secretary who evolves into a copywriter in the AMC dramatic series Mad Men. Between 2009 and the series' final season in 2015, Moss was nominated for five Primetime Emmy Awards for Outstanding Lead Actress in a Drama Series. She was also nominated for the Outstanding Supporting Actress Emmy in 2010. Reflecting on her casting in the series, Moss recalled: "I auditioned [for the role]. There were scripts for two pilots that everyone was talking about at the time that were really good, and Mad Men was one of them." Moss has stated her favorite episode is "The Suitcase" (2010) from season 4. Moss stated, "It was just a sort of wonderful bubble of an episode. I relished it and I'm super proud of how it came out." Luke de Smet of Slant wrote of the episode, "'The Suitcase' made for some absolutely tremendous television. Don and Peggy's respective breakdowns all but guarantee that this will be the Emmy tape for both Hamm and Moss".

While a series regular on Mad Men, Moss made her Broadway debut in October 2008, playing the role of Karen in the 20th Anniversary revival of Speed-the-Plow by David Mamet. In his review Ben Brantley of The New York Times acknowledged her role in Mad Men but noted "She definitely doesn't just repeat what she does on television." He added, "Ms. Moss proves the lie in that assessment, bringing a naked clarity to her unvarnished, tinny-voiced Karen that makes the play hang together in ways it didn't before." She then briefly appeared in the romantic comedy film Did You Hear About the Morgans? (2009), playing Sarah Jessica Parker's assistant.

=== 2010s: Professional expansion and The Handmaid's Tale ===
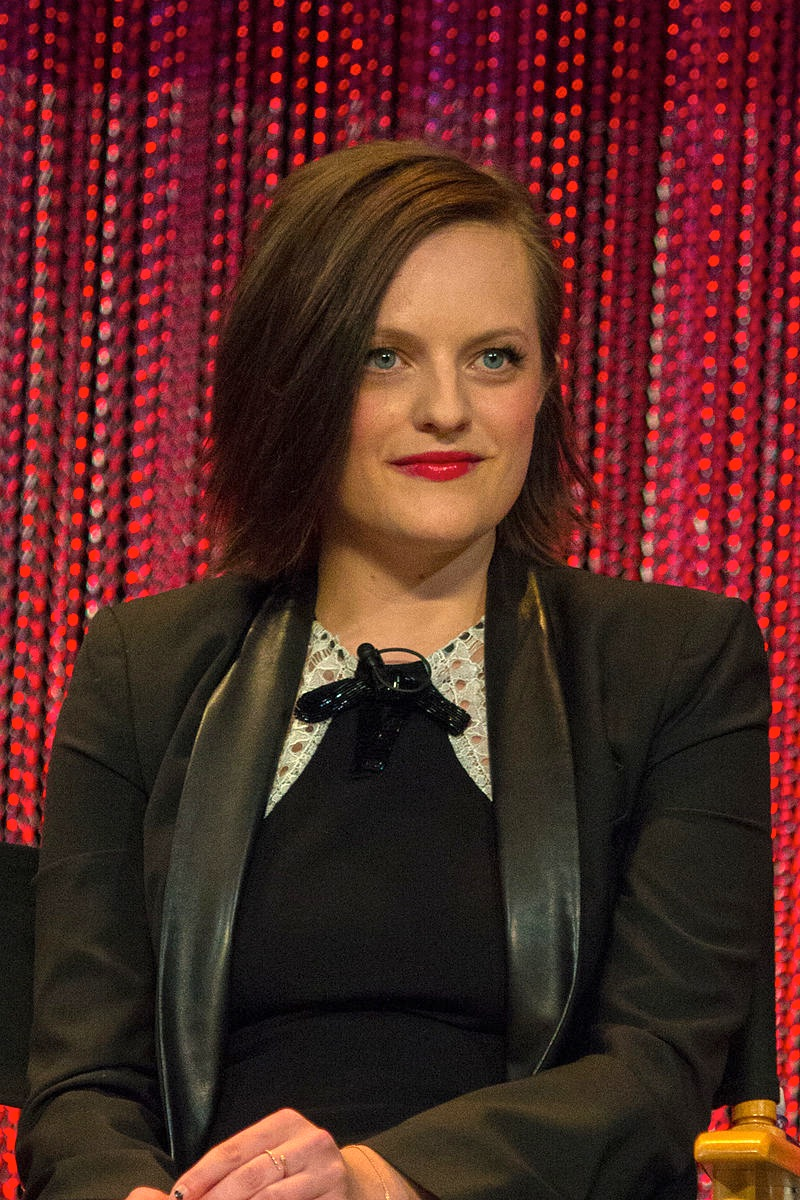
Moss at PaleyFest in 2014

In 2011, Moss made her West End debut as Martha Dobie in Lillian Hellman's play The Children's Hour, opposite Keira Knightley and Rebecca Hall. The play opened at The Comedy Theatre, London on January 22, 2011. Michael Billington of The Guardian described her performance as "Outstanding" noting, "Moss's achievement, in fact, is to combine the everyday busyness of a working teacher with subtle hints she has a suppressed longing that transcends mere friendship." In 2012, she was cast as Galatea Dunkel in the independent drama On the Road, based on Jack Kerouac's novel of the same name. Moss played detective Robin Griffin in the 2013 Sundance Channel miniseries Top of the Lake, a co-production by the Sundance Channel, the UK's BBC Two and Australia's UKTV, written and directed by Jane Campion.

In 2014, Moss starred in the independent film Listen Up Philip (2014), her first collaboration with writer-director Alex Ross Perry. She also starred in Charlie McDowell's The One I Love (2014) with Mark Duplass. Film critic Manhola Dargis of The New York Times wrote of her performance, "Ms. Moss, an amazing actress fast breaking free of the limits imposed on her by Mad Men...[Here] she creates a complex portrait of a woman tested by love whose smiles work like a barricade until fissures of feeling break down her last defenses. Ms. Moss lifts her and this movie with supple and steely grace." In September 2014, it was announced that Moss would star on Broadway as Heidi Holland in The Heidi Chronicles. The play opened on March 19, 2015, at The Music Box Theatre. Though the play received some positive reviews, it closed on May 3, 2015, due to low ticket sales. Charles Isherwood of The New York Times praised her writing "Ms. Moss, a superb actor who possesses an unusual ability to project innocence and smarts at the same time" adding, "Moss puts her own distinctive stamp on the part". For her performance she was nominated for a Tony Award for Best Actress in a Play.

After production on Mad Men had wrapped, Moss collaborated again with Alex Ross Perry, starring in Queen of Earth (2015), a psychological thriller opposite Katherine Waterston and Patrick Fugit, in which she plays a mentally unstable woman who unravels at a vacation home in the company of her close friends. Scott Foundas of Variety declared, "The movie belongs to Moss...who seems to have gotten profoundly on to Perry's wavelength. She plays out Catherine's decline with such startling, unpredictable rhythms that her every gesture seems conceived in the moment." She was cast in a supporting part in the British dystopian drama High-Rise (2015), opposite Tom Hiddleston and Sienna Miller. Moss appeared in the Chuck Wepner biopic Chuck (2016), opposite Liev Schreiber.

In 2017, she appeared in Mad to Be Normal, a biopic of the Scottish psychiatrist R.D. Laing, and co-starred in the film adaptation of Anton Chekhov's play The Seagull alongside Saoirse Ronan, Annette Bening, and Corey Stoll. The second season of Top of the Lake, consisting of six episodes, and which is set in Sydney, Australia, premiered at the Cannes Film Festival in May 2017. That same year, Moss began playing June Osbourne / Offred in the Hulu series The Handmaid's Tale, for which she has received critical acclaim and a Primetime Emmy Award for Lead Actress in a Drama Series. Liz Shannon Miller of IndieWire wrote, "[The show] owes a tremendous amount to Moss as its star...as an actor, she has to communicate silently without revealing too much about what the character really thinks.". She added, "[Moss] fully commands each and every moment, every swallowed emotion and thought."

In 2018, Moss had a lead role in a short film for the song "On the Nature of Daylight", by British composer Max Richter, from his album The Blue Notebooks. Moss reunited with Alex Ross Perry for Her Smell (2018), portraying the role of a fictional rock star whose band breaks up over her self-destructive behavior, and appeared in The Old Man & the Gun, directed by David Lowery. Both films received positive reviews from critics. In 2019, Moss co-starred in Jordan Peele's psychological horror film Us alongside Lupita Nyong'o. Later that year, she starred in The Kitchen, alongside Melissa McCarthy and Tiffany Haddish, which follows three housewives who, after their mobster husbands are sent to prison, continue to operate their business.

=== 2020s: Roles in streaming projects ===
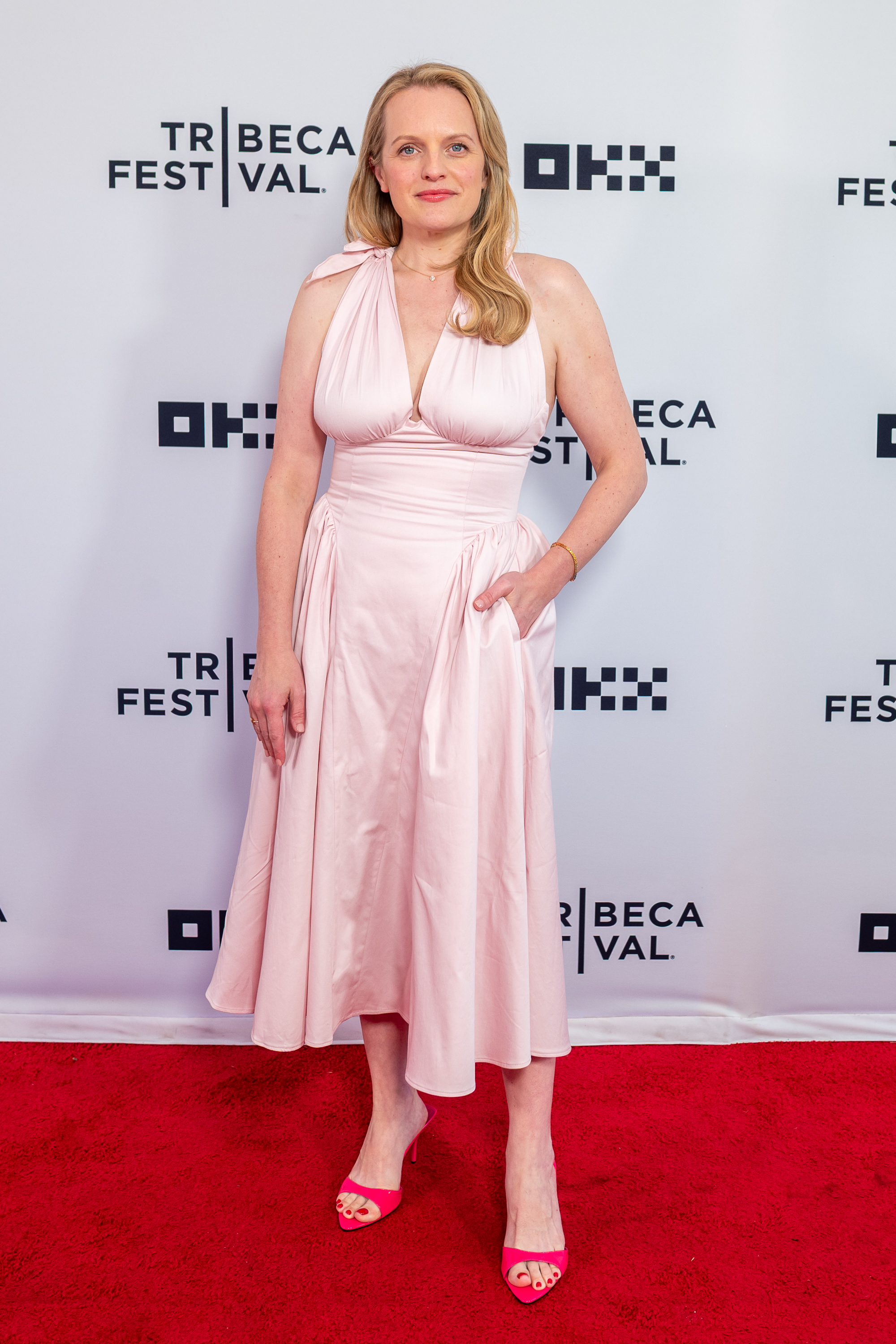
Moss attends the 2026 Tribeca Film Festival in June 2026

In 2020, Moss starred in Shirley, opposite Michael Stuhlbarg and directed by Josephine Decker, portraying the role of author Shirley Jackson, which premiered at the Sundance Film Festival. She also had the starring role in the horror-thriller film The Invisible Man, alongside Oliver Jackson-Cohen and Storm Reid, which was released on February 28, 2020, to critical acclaim. In 2021, Moss appeared in The French Dispatch, directed by Wes Anderson. She appeared in Next Goal Wins, directed by Taika Waititi, in 2023. In 2020, Moss also launched a production company Love & Squalor Pictures. She was set to star in and produce Run Rabbit Run directed by Daina Reid.

In 2022, she starred as Kirby Mazrachi in the Apple TV+ thriller series Shining Girls based on the 2013 novel of the same name by Lauren Beukes. She also served as the executive producer and directed two episodes. Moss stated that the experience was "definitely one of the most complicated things I've ever done". In his review, Daniel Fienberg of The Hollywood Reporter declared, "No single actor in the past 25 years has a more reliable television track record than Elisabeth Moss".

In 2024, she starred in the FX on Hulu thriller limited series The Veil starring as Imogen Salter, a veteran MI6 agent. She also served as an executive producer. David Bianculli of NPR wrote, "By the end of the six episodes of The Veil, I was convinced that this is Moss' best role, and best performance, yet. She's amazing." Ben Travers of IndieWire wrote a mixed review praising Moss as an actress and comparing her to "Julia Louis-Dreyfus and Carrie Coon" but described the spy thriller series as "regressive to the genre itself".

== Personal life ==
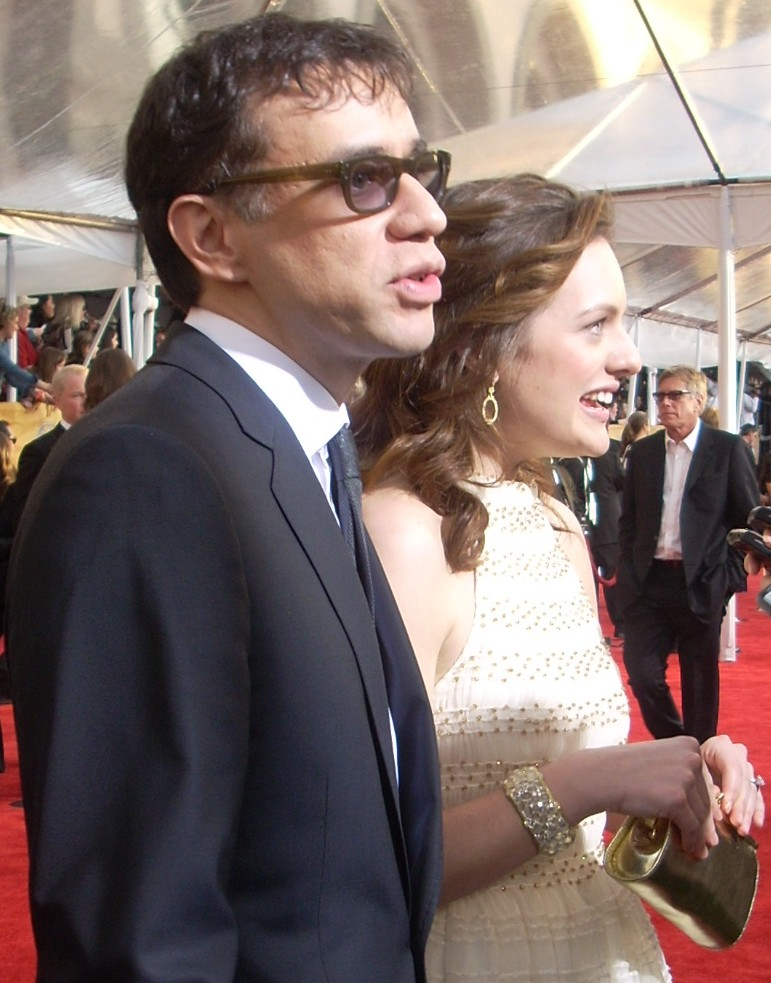
Moss with Fred Armisen in 2009

Moss holds both British and American citizenship.

She met Fred Armisen in October 2008, and they became engaged in January 2009, marrying on October 25, 2009, in Long Island City, New York. They separated in June 2010, and in September 2010, Moss filed for divorce, which was finalized on May 13, 2011.

Moss practices Scientology and identifies as a feminist. After a fan questioned whether her role in the Hulu series The Handmaid's Tale made her think about her involvement with the Church of Scientology, Moss defended her beliefs on Instagram, writing that fans' description of Scientology and the fictional Gilead's supposedly mutual belief "that all outside sources are wrong or evil" is "actually not true at all". She continued, "Religious freedom and tolerance and understanding the truth and equal rights for every race, religion and creed are extremely important to me."

Moss gave birth to a child in 2024. No further information, such as the identity of the father, has been released.

== Filmography ==
=== Film ===
Year	Title	Role	Notes	Ref.
1991	Suburban Commando	Little Girl		
1993	Once Upon a Forest	Michelle (voice)		
1994	Imaginary Crimes	Greta Weiler		
1995	Separate Lives	Ronni Beckwith		
1995	The Last Supper	Jenny Tyler		
1997	A Thousand Acres	Linda		
1998	Angelmaker	Little Turcott	Short film	
1999	The Joyriders	Jodi		
1999	Mumford	Katie Brockett		
1999	Anywhere but Here	Rachel		
1999	Girl, Interrupted	Polly 'Torch' Clark		
2002	West of Here	Cherise		
2002	Heart of America	Robin Walters		
2003	Temptation	Wind, Morgan		
2003	Virgin	Jessie Reynolds		
2003	The Missing	Anne		
2005	Bittersweet Place	Paulie Schaffer		
2007	The Attic	Emma Callan		
2007	They Never Found Her	Anna	Short film	
2007	Day Zero	Patricia		
2007	Honored	Katie	Short film	
2008	El camino	Lily		
2008	New Orleans, Mon Amour	Hyde		
2009	Did You Hear About the Morgans?	Jackie Drake		
2010	A Buddy Story	Susan		
2010	Get Him to the Greek	Daphne Binks		
2011	Green Lantern: Emerald Knights	Arisia Rrab (voice)	Direct-to-video	
2012	Smoking/Non-Smoking	Diana Whelan		
2012	Darling Companion	Grace Winter		
2012	On the Road	Galatea Dunkel		
2014	Listen Up Philip	Ashley		
2014	The One I Love	Sophie		
2015	Queen of Earth	Catherine	Also producer	
2015	Meadowland	Shannon		
2015	Truth	Lucy Scott		
2015	High-Rise	Helen Wilder		
2016	The Free World	Doris Lamb		
2016	Chuck	Phyllis Wepner		
2017	Mad to Be Normal	Angie Wood		
2017	Tokyo Project	Claire	Short film	
2017	The Square	Anne		
2018	The Seagull	Masha		
2018	The Old Man & the Gun	Dorothy		
2018	Her Smell	Becky Something	Also producer	
2019	Light of My Life	Mom		
2019	Us	Kitty Tyler / Dahlia		
2019	The Kitchen	Claire Walsh		
2020	Shirley	Shirley Jackson	Also producer	
2020	The Invisible Man	Cecilia Kass		
2021	The French Dispatch	Alumna		
2023	Next Goal Wins	Gail		
2024	Shell	Samantha "Sam" Lake	Also producer	

=== Television ===
Year	Title	Role	Notes	Ref.
1990	Bar Girls	Robin	Television film	
1990	Lucky Chances	Lucky - Age 6	3 episodes	
1991	Prison Stories: Women on the Inside	Little Molly	Television film	
1991	Anything but Love	Unknown	Episode: "A Tale of Two Kiddies"	
1992	Midnight's Child	Christina	Television film	
1992	Frosty Returns	Holly DeCarlo (voice)	Television special	
1992	It's Spring Training, Charlie Brown	Patty (voice)	Television special	
1992–1995	Picket Fences	Cynthia Parks	7 episodes	
1993	Batman: The Animated Series	Kimmy Ventrix (voice)	Episode: "See No Evil"	
1993	Johnny Bago	Agnes	Episode: "Hail the Conquering Marrow"	
1993	Animaniacs	Katrina (voice)	Episode: "Puttin' on the Blitz"	
1993	Gypsy	Baby Louise	Television film	
1995	Escape to Witch Mountain	Anna	Television film	
1995	Freakazoid!	Kathy (voice)	Episode: "Candle Jack"	
1995	Naomi & Wynonna: Love Can Build a Bridge	Teenage Ashley Judd	2-part television film	
1999	Earthly Possessions	Mindy	Television film	
1999–2006	The West Wing	Zoey Bartlet	Recurring; 25 episodes	
2001	Spirit	Kelly	Television film	
2003	The Practice	Jessica Palmer	Episode: "Rape Shield"	
2005	Law & Order: Trial by Jury	Katie Nevins	Episode: "Baby Boom"	
2005–2006	Invasion	Christina	5 episodes	
2006	Law & Order: Criminal Intent	Rebecca Colemar	Episode: "The Good"	
2007	Grey's Anatomy	Nina Rogerson	Episode: "My Favorite Mistake"	
2007	Ghost Whisperer	Nikki Drake	Episode: "Unhappy Medium"	
2007	Medium	Jennie / Haley Heffernan	Episode: "No One to Watch Over Me"	
2007–2015	Mad Men	Peggy Olson	Main cast, 88 episodes	
2008	Fear Itself	Danny Bannerman	Episode: "Eater"	
2008	Saturday Night Live	Peggy Olson	Episode: "Jon Hamm/Coldplay"; uncredited	
2009	Mercy	Lucy Morton	Episode: "The Last Thing I Said Was"	
2013, 2017	Top of the Lake	Robin Griffin	Main cast, 13 episodes	
2013	The Simpsons	Gretchen (voice)	Episode: "Labor Pains"	
2017–2025	The Handmaid's Tale	June Osborne / Offred	Main cast, also executive producer and director of 10 episodes	
2020	A West Wing Special to Benefit When We All Vote	Herself	Television special	
2022	Shining Girls	Kirby Mazrachi	Main cast, 8 episodes; also executive producer and director	
2024	The Veil	Imogen Salter	Main cast, 6 episodes; also executive producer	
2026	Imperfect Women	Mary	Main cast, 8 episodes; also executive producer	
2026	The Testaments	June Osborne	3 episodes; also executive producer	

=== Theatre ===
Year	Title	Role	Playwright	Venue	Ref.
2002	Franny's Way	Young Franny - Age 17	Richard Nelson	Linda Gross Theater, Off-Broadway	
2008	Speed-the-Plow	Karen	David Mamet	Ethel Barrymore Theatre, Broadway	
2011	The Children's Hour	Martha Dobie	Lillian Hellman	The Comedy Theatre, West End	
2015	The Heidi Chronicles	Heidi Holland	Wendy Wasserstein	Music Box Theatre, Broadway	

== Awards and nominations ==
Moss earned critical acclaim and numerous accolades for her performances in film and television. She received two Golden Globe Awards from four nominations, two Primetime Emmy Awards from fourteen nominations, two Critics' Choice Television Awards from five nominations, and two Screen Actors Guild Awards from fifteen nominations.

She was named the "Queen of Peak TV" by Vulture in 2017.
