= List of The Handmaid's Tale and The Testaments characters =

The Handmaid's Tale and The Testaments are American dystopian drama streaming television series created for Hulu by Bruce Miller, based on the 1985 novel of the same name and the 2019 novel of the same name by Margaret Atwood. The plot of both series follow a dystopian future following a Second American Civil War wherein a totalitarian society subjects fertile women, called "Handmaids", to child-bearing slavery. The first three episodes of the series premiered on April 26, 2017; the subsequent seven episodes aired on a weekly basis every Wednesday. In May 2017, the series was renewed for a second season which premiered on April 25, 2018. The series features an ensemble cast including Elisabeth Moss, Joseph Fiennes, Yvonne Strahovski, Alexis Bledel, Madeline Brewer, Ann Dowd, O-T Fagbenle, Max Minghella, and Samira Wiley. Amanda Brugel had a recurring role in the first season before being promoted to the main cast for the second.The following list of characters and actors includes the series' main cast, all guest stars deemed to have had recurring roles throughout the series, and any other guest who is otherwise notable.

== Overview ==
Character	Portrayed by	The Handmaid's Tale						The Testaments
Character	Portrayed by	1	2	3	4	5	6	1
Main
June Osborne	Elisabeth Moss	Main	Main	Main	Main	Main	Main	Guest
Commander Fred Waterford	Joseph Fiennes	Main	Main	Main	Main			
Serena Joy Waterford	Yvonne Strahovski	Main	Main	Main	Main	Main	Main	
Dr. Emily Malek	Alexis Bledel	Main	Main	Main	Main		Special Guest	
Janine Lindo	Madeline Brewer	Main	Main	Main	Main	Main	Main	
Aunt Lydia Clements	Ann Dowd	Main	Main	Main	Main	Main	Main	Main
Lucas "Luke" Bankole	O-T Fagbenle	Main	Main	Main	Main	Main	Main	
Commander Nick Blaine	Max Minghella	Main	Main	Main	Main	Main	Main	
Moira Strand	Samira Wiley	Main	Main	Main	Main	Main	Main	
Rita Blue	Amanda Brugel	Recurring	Main	Main	Main	Main	Main	Guest
Commander Joseph Lawrence	Bradley Whitford		Recurring	Main	Main	Main	Main	
Mark Tuello	Sam Jaeger		Guest	Recurring	Main	Main	Main	Voice Cameo
Naomi Putnam	Ever Carradine	Recurring	Recurring	Recurring	Guest	Recurring	Main	
Agnes MacKenzie / Hannah Bankole	Jordana Blake	Recurring	Recurring	Recurring	Guest	Recurring		
Agnes MacKenzie / Hannah Bankole	Chase Infiniti							Main
Daisy (Marguerite)	Lucy Halliday							Main
Aunt Vidala (Vivian)	Mabel Li							Main
Garth Chapin	Brad Alexander							Main
Hulda Marie Edwardson	Isolde Ardies							Main
Shunammite Hayes	Rowan Blanchard							Main
Rebecka "Becka" Grove	Mattea Conforti							Main
Aunt Gabbana	Zarrin Darnell-Martin							Main
Aunt Estee	Eva Foote							Main
Rosa	Kira Guloien							Main
Jehosheba Yardarm	Shechinah Mpumlwana							Main
Miriam Dawnson	Birva Pandya							Main
Paula MacKenzie	Amy Seimetz							Main
Recurring
Alma	Nina Kiri	Recurring	Recurring	Recurring	Recurring	Guest	Guest	
Brianna	Bahia Watson	Recurring	Recurring	Recurring	Recurring	Guest	Guest	
Commander Warren Putnam	Stephen Kunken	Recurring	Recurring	Recurring	Recurring	Recurring		
Dolores	Jenessa Grant	Recurring	Recurring	Guest				
Lillie Fuller	Tattiawna Jones	Recurring	Recurring					
Beth	Kristen Gutoskie	Recurring		Recurring	Guest			
Erin	Erin Way	Guest	Recurring	Guest				
Rachel Tapping	Krista Morin	Guest	Recurring		Recurring			
Eleanor Lawrence	Julie Dretzin		Recurring	Recurring				
Holly Maddox	Cherry Jones		Recurring	Guest			Recurring	
Eden Spencer	Sydney Sweeney		Recurring					
Commander Ray Cushing	Greg Bryk		Recurring					
Sylvia	Clea DuVall		Guest	Recurring		Guest		
Commander Matthew Calhoun	Jonathan Watton			Recurring	Recurring	Recurring	Recurring	
Sienna	Sugenja Sri			Recurring	Guest			
Natalie	Ashleigh LaThrop			Recurring				
Commander George Winslow	Christopher Meloni			Recurring				
Aunt Elizabeth	Edie Inksetter	Guest	Guest	Guest	Recurring	Guest		
Esther Keyes	Mckenna Grace				Recurring	Recurring		
Oona	Zawe Ashton				Recurring			
Rose Blaine	Carey Cox					Recurring	Recurring	
Alanis Wheeler	Genevieve Angelson					Recurring		
Ezra Shaw	Rossif Sutherland					Recurring		
Commander MacKenzie	Jason Butler Harner					Recurring		Recurring
Ryan Wheeler	Lucas Neff					Recurring		
Commander Gabriel Wharton	Josh Charles						Recurring (Note: Credited as "Special Guest Star".)	
Commander Bell	Timothy Simons						Recurring	
Ellen	Athena Karkanis						Recurring	
Commander Reynolds	Tim Campbell						Recurring	
Aunt Phoebe	D'Arcy Carden						Recurring	

== Main characters ==
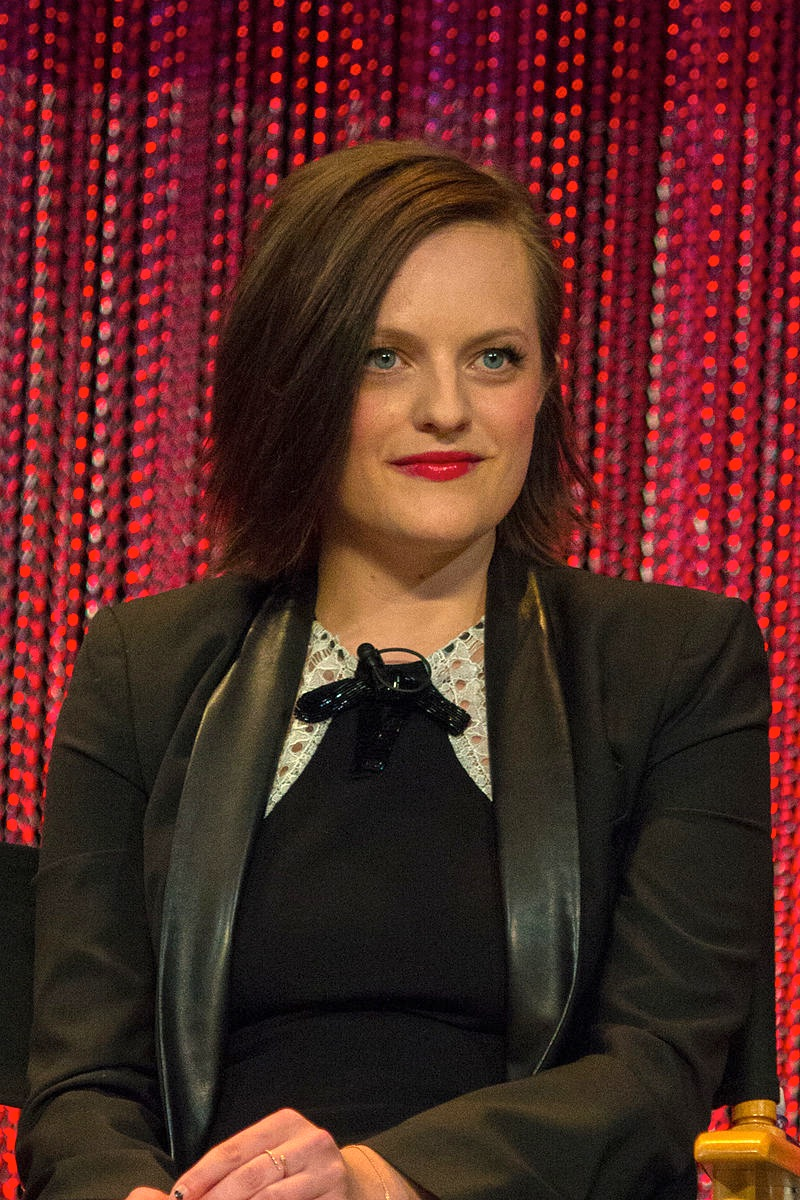
Elisabeth Moss

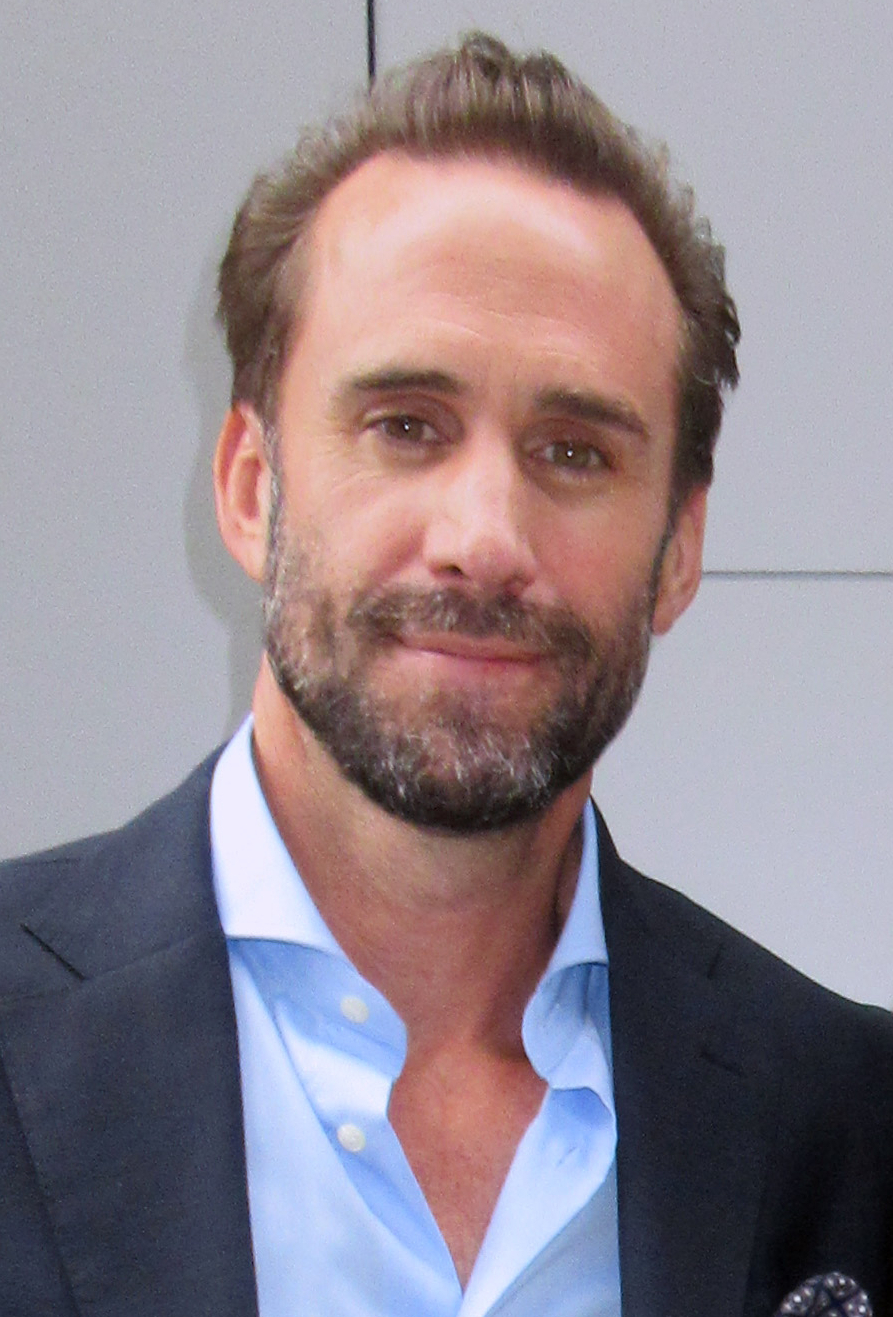
Joseph Fiennes

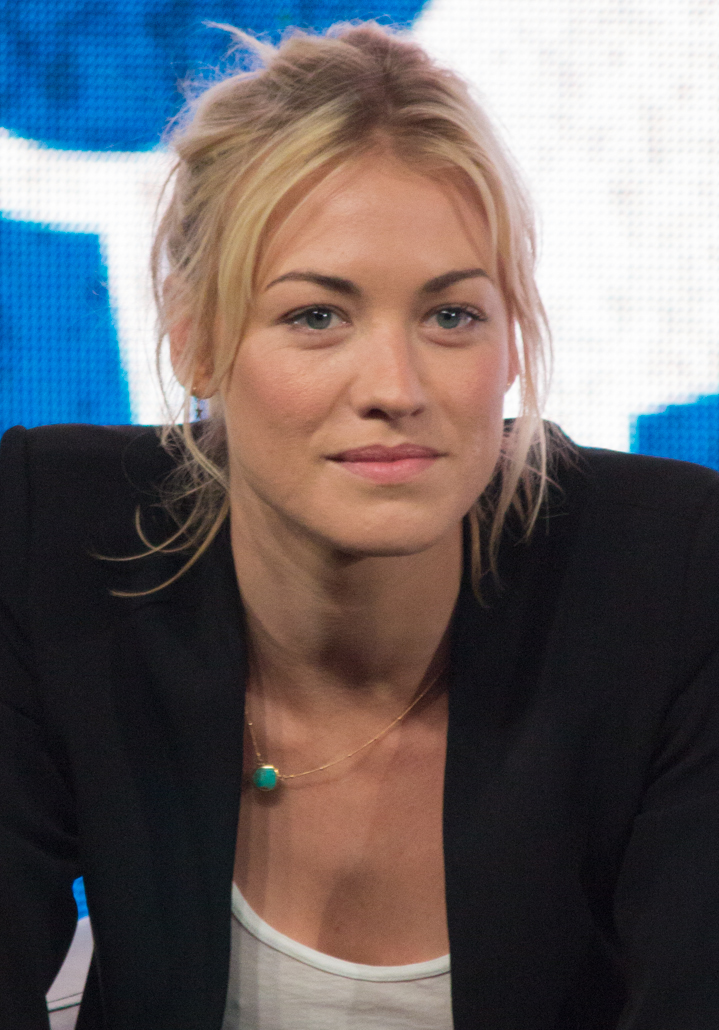
Yvonne Strahovski

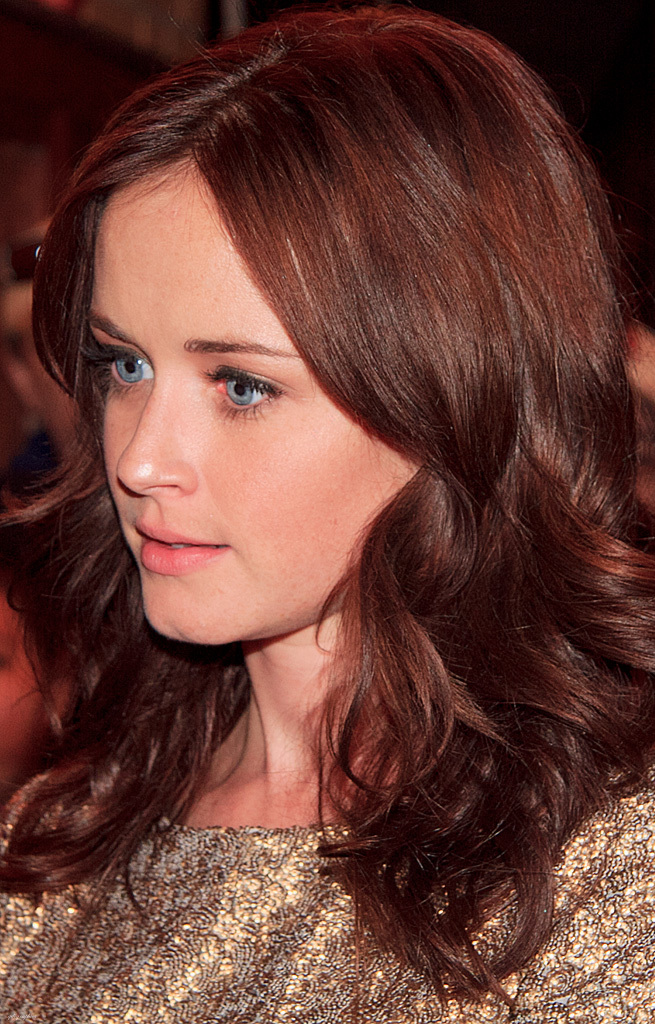
Alexis Bledel

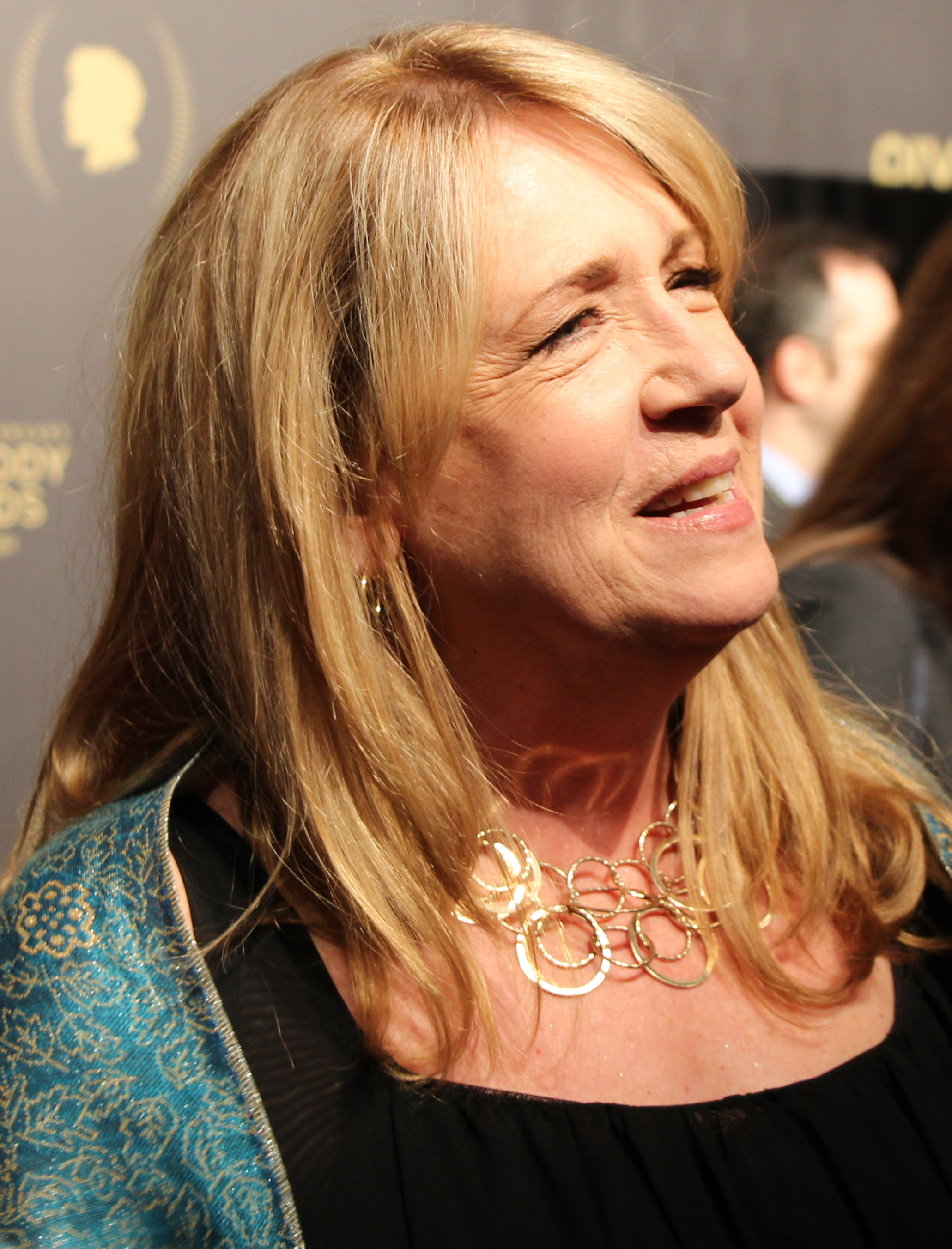
Ann Dowd

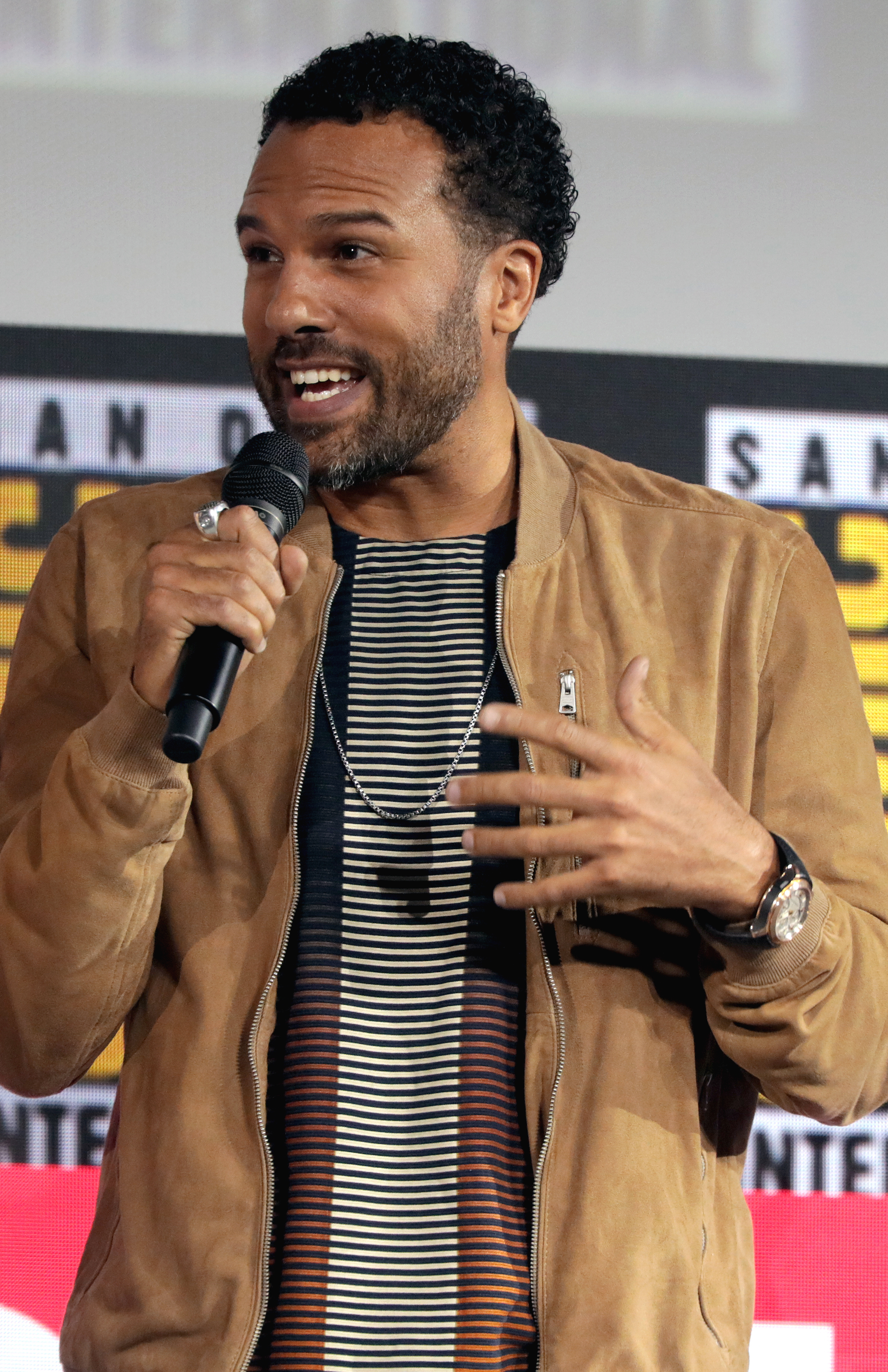
O-T Fagbenle

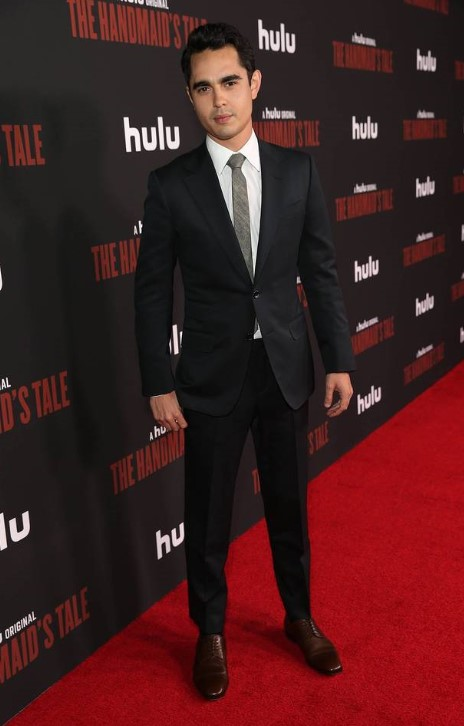
Max Minghella

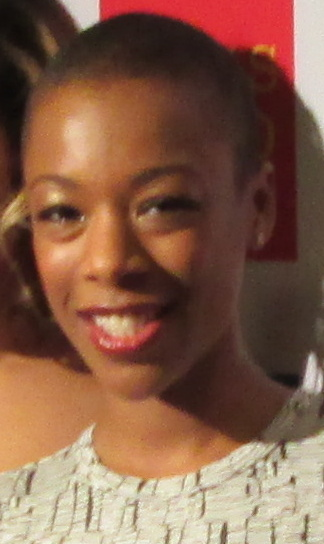
Samira Wiley

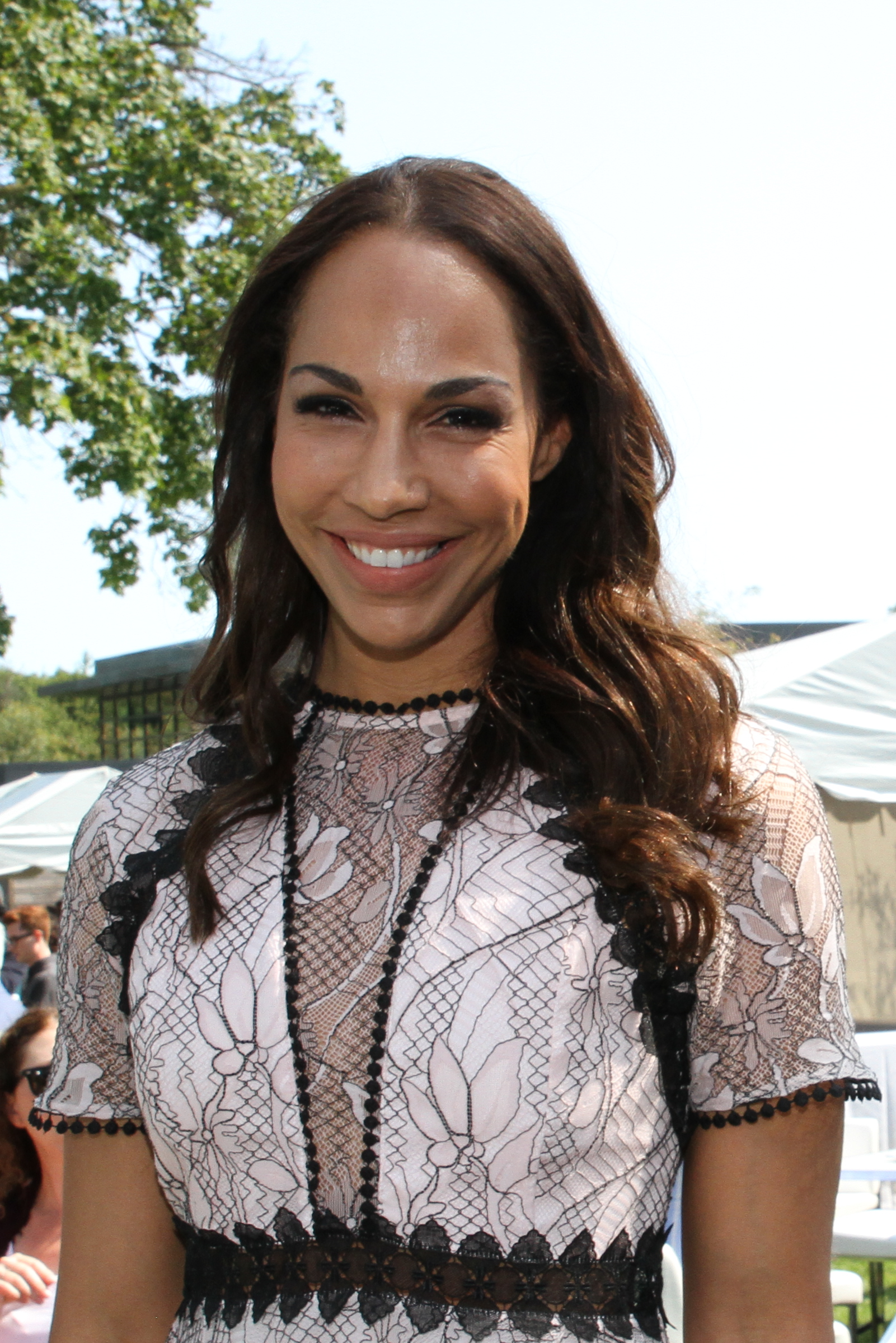
Amanda Brugel

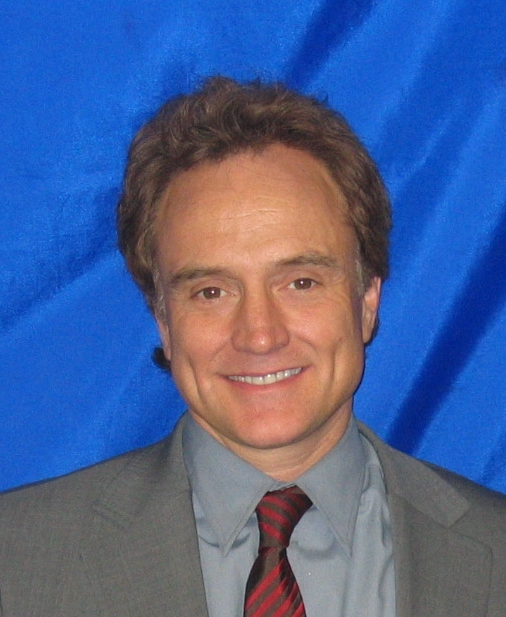
Bradley Whitford

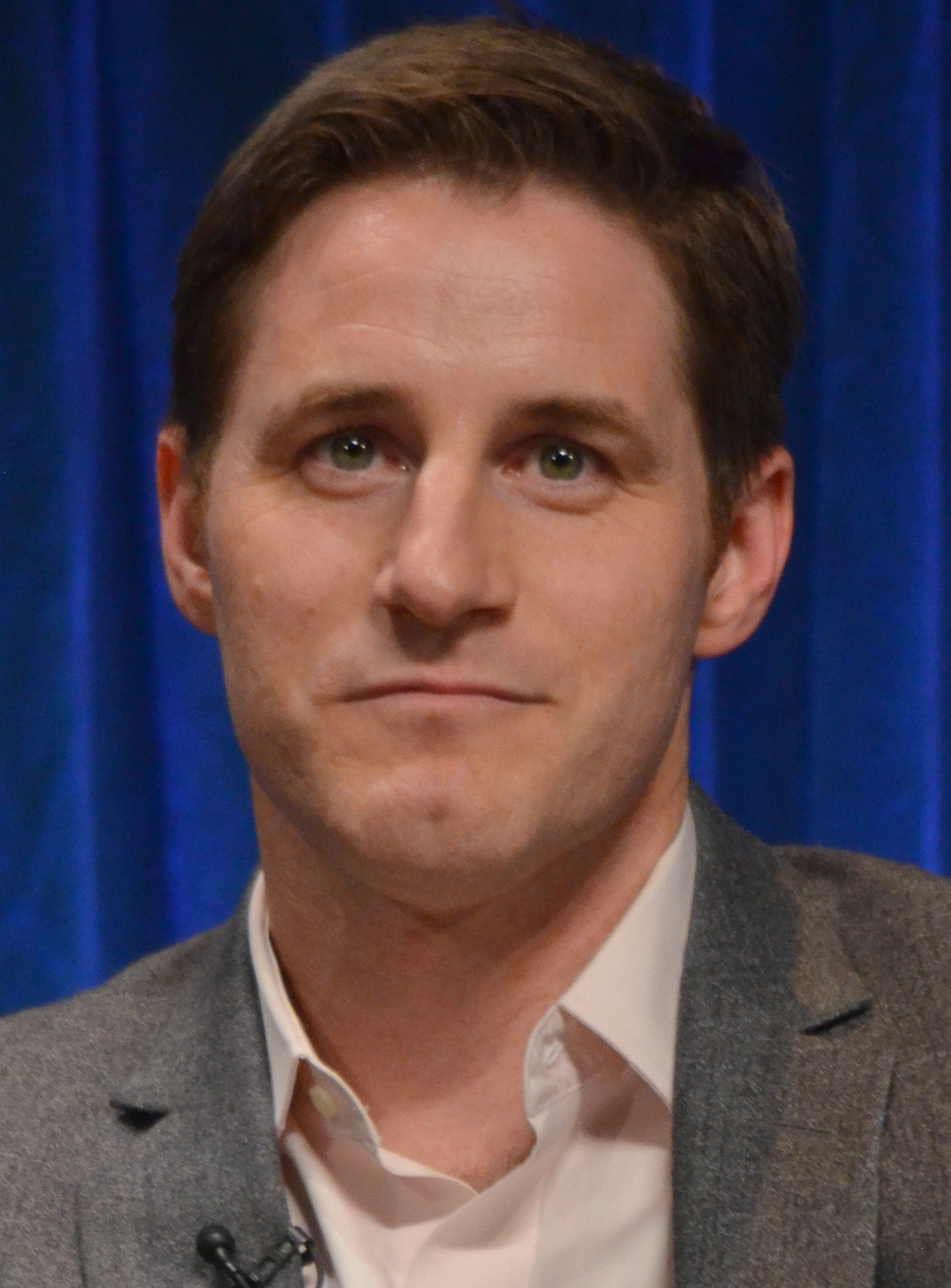
Sam Jaeger

=== June Osborne ===
June Osborne (portrayed by Elisabeth Moss) is a woman who was captured while attempting to escape to Canada with her husband, Luke, and daughter, Hannah. Due to her fertility, she is made a Handmaid to Commander Fred Waterford and his wife, Serena Joy, and is named "Offred".

June reappears in The Testaments.

Moss was first announced as the lead actress in April 2016.

=== Commander Fred Waterford ===
Commander Fred Waterford (portrayed by Joseph Fiennes) is a high-ranking government official, chief diplomat, and Offred's master. Both he and his wife played an instrumental role in Gilead's founding. He wishes to have more contact with June outside of what is lawful between a Handmaid and her master, and starts inviting her to play nightly games of Scrabble. He feigns a kind personality, often portraying himself as a victim of Gilead, but in reality, he is cruel and aggressive. He was responsible for the founding of Gilead, being one of the leaders of the Sons of Jacob. After Commander Pryce's death, he becomes the head of the Council. This role is comparable to a prime minister. At the end of season 4, Waterford is beaten to death by June and vengeful other former Handmaids and his body is hung from a wall in no man's land.

Fiennes joined the cast in August 2016.

=== Serena Joy Waterford ===
Serena Joy Waterford (portrayed by Yvonne Strahovski) is Fred's wife and a former conservative cultural activist and author of a controversial book, A Woman's Place, which advocates women as second-class citizens who exist merely to be obedient and submissive housewives and mothers, rather than be independent of their menfolk and pursuing careers. She appears to have accepted her new role in the Gilead society that she helped create. She is poised and deeply religious, but is capable of great cruelty and is often callous to June. She is desperate to become a mother, but most men are sterile. Showrunners have said we will see that Serena is actually fertile. Although a friend of Commander Cushing, she denounces him, fearing his heavy response to the bombing and his semi-dictatorial power. In later seasons, she successfully becomes pregnant with her son Noah, but Fred is killed by June and the other Handmaids. Serena eventually remarries to High Commander Gabriel Wharton, but abandons him on their wedding night after realizing that Wharton is a monster. In the series finale, after helping the resistance kill the Boston Commanders, Serena is left a refugee with no power, but content as she has her son.

Strahovski joined the cast in August 2016.

=== Emily Malek ===
Emily (portrayed by Alexis Bledel), also referred to as Ofglen and later Ofsteven, is June's shopping partner. Although June is initially wary of her, it is revealed Ofglen is not as pious as she seems, and the two become friends. Ofglen had a wife and son and was a university lecturer in cellular biology. Although homosexuality is punishable by death in Gilead and most university professors are sent to labor camps, Ofglen was spared and made a Handmaid due to her fertility. She is later captured and cruelly punished for her homosexual relationship with a Martha and is assigned to another household where she becomes "Ofsteven". She is involved with a resistance movement called "Mayday". In season 3, we witness Emily's post-traumatic struggles as she escapes Gilead and is reunited with her wife and son in Canada. After being absent in seasons 5 and 6, Emily reunites with June in the series finale where it's revealed that she has been fighting in the resistance in Bridgeport, Connecticut.

Bledel was cast in January 2017.

=== Janine Lindo ===
Janine (portrayed by Madeline Brewer) is a Handmaid who entered the Red Center for training at the same time as June. She considers June a friend because of her kind treatment. During training, Janine's right eye is removed as a punishment for her initial non-compliance. She reveals a past rape during training and the other Handmaids are forced to tell Janine the abuse was her fault, causing her great emotional harm. She becomes mentally unstable due to her mistreatment and often behaves in temperamental or childlike ways. She is assigned to Warren and Naomi Putnam and becomes "Ofwarren". She eventually gives birth to a baby girl the Putnams name "Angela", though Janine insists the baby's name is "Charlotte". Janine is later reassigned and becomes "Ofdaniel". She was temporarily assigned to the Colonies until a bombing at the new Rachel and Leah Center. In the series finale, Janine is finally reunited with her daughter by Aunt Lydia and Naomi Lawrence.

Brewer was cast as Janine in August 2016.

=== Aunt Lydia ===
Aunt Lydia (portrayed by Ann Dowd) is in charge of overseeing the Handmaids in their training, sexual reeducation, and duties. She is brutal and subjects insubordinate Handmaids to harsh physical punishment, but she also cares for her charges and believes deeply in the Gileadean mission and doctrine. She appears to have a soft spot for Janine and even goes so far as to address her by her given name on occasion. She was heavily injured in Season 2. In Season 3, it was revealed in a flashback that her real name is Lydia Clements, and she was an elementary school teacher who taught fourth grade. In the final episodes of the series, Lydia has a change of heart after the massacre of the Boston Commanders, causing her to nearly be hanged alongside the Handmaids. Although Lydia returns to Gilead afterwards, she remains in contact with the American forces and helps to secure Janine's release from custody in the series finale.

In The Testaments, she now runs the Aunt Lydia School.

Dowd was cast in July 2016.

=== Luke Bankole ===
Lucas "Luke" Bankole (portrayed by O-T Fagbenle) is June's husband from before Gilead. Because he is divorced (he and June began their relationship before his divorce from his first wife), their union is considered invalid in the new society. June is considered an adulteress and their daughter, Hannah, is considered illegitimate. Initially, June believes he has been killed, but it is later revealed Luke managed to escape to Canada.

Fagbenle was cast in September 2016.

=== Nick Blaine ===
Nick Blaine (portrayed by Max Minghella) is Commander Waterford's driver and a former drifter from Michigan who has feelings for June. June and Nick develop an intimate relationship and have a daughter, whom they wanted to name Holly. Later, June decides to give her the name that Serena had chosen, Nicole. June early on discovers that Nick is an Eye, a spy for Gilead. He is eventually promoted to the rank of Commander and briefly sent to the war front in Chicago. His direct superior is Commander Pryce, head of Security, who wants him to "control Waterford" in the prevision of further purges of Gilead. He passes then to the leadership of Cushing, which starts a brief authoritarian regime, and then Warren Putnam. Ultimately, Nick's loyalty to Gilead wins out over his love for June, resulting in his death alongside the other surviving Commanders when their plane is blown up by Commander Lawrence on behalf of Mayday. With his last words, Nick reflects on how June had told him many times to abandon his life in Gilead.

Minghella was cast in July 2016.

=== Moira Strand ===
Moira (portrayed by Samira Wiley), also referred to as Ruby, is June's best friend since college. She is already at the Red Center when June enters Handmaid training but escapes before being assigned to a home. She is recaptured and becomes "Ruby", a Jezebel. She seems to have given up hope of ever being free, but on meeting June again, regains the conviction to escape.

Wiley joined the main cast in July 2016.

=== Rita Blue ===
Rita (portrayed by Amanda Brugel) is a Martha at the Waterford home. She had a son who died fighting in the Civil War when he was 19 years old. Rita is part of the resistance and helped June escape with baby Nicole at the end of season 2. At the end of Season 3, Rita escapes to Canada on a plane with over 80 children and several other Marthas.

Brugel was cast in the recurring role of Rita in September 2016. In August 2017, she was promoted to the main cast for the second season.

Rita reappears in The Testaments where she helps Daisy prepare for her undercover mission in Gilead. In the years since the end of The Handmaid's Tale, Rita has moved to Canada and gone into culinary school, but remains connected with the resistance.

=== Commander Joseph Lawrence ===
Commander Joseph Lawrence (portrayed by Bradley Whitford) is considered the "architect of Gilead's economy," and the creator of the Colonies, as well a gruff and intimidating man with a disheveled mad genius vibe. His sly humor and flashes of kindness make him a confusing, mysterious presence for his newest Handmaid. He shows regrets for his past and could be a member of the Mayday resistance. In the penultimate episode, Lawrence sacrifices himself to blow up a plane full of Commanders to help secure Mayday's victory.

Whitford joined the recurring cast in February 2018. He was promoted to the main cast for the third season in October 2018.

=== Mark Tuello ===
Commander Mark Tuello (portrayed by Sam Jaeger) is a mysterious stranger who Serena encounters in Canada, later revealed to be a representative of the US government-in-exile. He plays a bigger role in Season 3. In the series finale, Tuello is revealed to be a Commander in the American military.

Jaeger was promoted to the main cast in season 4.

In The Testaments, Tuello appears in several episodes in a voice cameo as the announcer on Radio Free Boston, a resistance pirate radio station.

=== Agnes MacKenzie ===
Agnes MacKenzie, born Hannah Bankole (portrayed by Chase Infiniti in The Testaments and by Jordana Blake in The Handmaid's Tale) is June and Luke's daughter and a girl at the top of the heap in Gilead.

=== Daisy ===
Daisy, portrayed by Lucy Halliday, is a teenager from Toronto who, after the murder of her parents, learns from June Osborne that she was smuggled out of Gilead as a baby. Daisy serves as a Mayday operative undercover in the Aunt Lydia School for future Wives. It's eventually revealed that Daisy is actually a nickname and her real name is Marguerite.

In The Testaments novel, Daisy is actually Nichole, June Osborne's daughter. However, with the much shorter time skip between The Handmaid's Tale and The Testaments adaptations, this was changed so that Daisy is a separate character.

=== Garth Chapin ===
Garth Chapin, portrayed Brad Alexander in The Testaments, is a young Guardian in the MacKenzie household who Agnes develops obvious feelings for. He is secretly a deep cover Mayday operative who serves as Daisy's handler. Garth later receives a promotion to Commander.

== Recurring characters ==
The following is a list of guest characters that have recurring roles throughout the series.

=== Introduced in season 1 ===
- Alma (portrayed by Nina Kiri), also referred to as Ofrobert, is another Handmaid who trained at the Red Center with June, Moira, and Janine. She is frank and chatty and often trades gossip and news with June. She is also involved with Mayday and becomes June's first contact with the resistance group.
- Commander Warren Putnam (portrayed by Stephen Kunken) is a Commander in the Republic of Gilead. He is the husband of Naomi Putnam and the first known Commander of Janine (Ofwarren). He had his left hand amputated by the Council after being found guilty of adultery. He later becomes the right hand of Waterford in the Council itself, and the head of Security after the arrest of Cushing, who had established a semi-dictatorial regime too violent and exclusive for Gilead. He personally carries out Cushing's arrest "on Waterford order". In season 5, he's executed for apostasy after raping Esther Keyes and getting her pregnant.
- Naomi Putnam (portrayed by Ever Carradine) is Commander Warren Putnam's wife. She views her baby largely as a status symbol and has no sympathy for the Handmaids. After Putnam's death, she marries Commander Lawrence. In the series finale, Naomi assists Lydia in securing Janine's release and returns the baby to her biological mother after an emotional goodbye. Carradine joined the cast in October 2016.
- Lillie Fuller (portrayed by Tattiawna Jones), also referred to as Ofglen, is a woman who replaces Emily in the position after Emily is captured by the Eyes. She initially follows the rules and does not wish to upset the status quo, but this is because she believes her life as a Handmaid is better than the difficult, impoverished life she led prior to Gilead, rather than out of religious piety. After having her tongue removed, Lillie carries out a bombing of the new Red Center, killing 26 Commanders and 31 Handmaids, including Commander Pryce. June later learns that Lillie had gotten the bomb from Allison, a rebel bombmaker who is a former chemistry teacher.
- Dolores (portrayed by Jenessa Grant), also referred to as Ofsamuel, is a local Handmaid with a friendly and talkative nature.
- Briana (portrayed by Bahia Watson), also referred to as Oferic, is another local Handmaid who is friends with June.
- Commander Andrew Pryce (portrayed by Robert Curtis Brown). One of the architects of the Sons of Jacob movement. He is a high-ranking commander who employs Nick as an Eye, and the head of Security. He gains political power very quickly, eventually becoming head of the Council (Govern) and an influential member of the Committee (Senate). He is later replaced in these roles by Cushing and Waterford, after dying in a terrorist action. He seems a faithful man but proves to be cruel and opportunist. He is also the superior of Nick and wants to "purge and clean" Gilead.
- Beth (portrayed by Kristen Gutoskie) is a Martha at Jezebel's. She has an arrangement with Nick whereby she trades illegal alcohol and other contraband for drugs, which the Jezebels use. She has a casual sexual relationship with him and is aware that he is an Eye. Beth becomes a recurring character in season three as one of the two Marthas working at Commander Lawrence's household.
- Erin (portrayed by Erin Way) is a young, apparently mute, woman who was being trained to become a Handmaid but managed to escape to Canada.

=== Introduced in season 2 ===
- Eden Spencer (portrayed by Sydney Sweeney) is a pious and obedient girl who dreams of one day being a Commander's wife. Eden is eventually married to Nick Blaine, but starts an affair after realizing that he doesn't love her, resulting in Eden and her lover being drowned for refusing to renounce their "sin." Sweeney was cast in May 2017.
- Commander Ray Cushing (portrayed by Greg Bryk) is a high government official who is friends with the Commanders Pryce and Waterford, and Serena. Cushing, his wife, and the Waterfords were friends before Gilead and used to travel together. Cushing is chosen to replace Commander Pryce following the Rachel and Leah Center bombing, thus becoming the head of the Council (Govern) and of Security. He acts like the absolute ruler of Gilead for a while, abusing his power and proving to be a cruel tyrant, ordering dozens of random executions. He also questions Offred about who aided her when she tried to flee the country. Fearing the possibility of her household being targeted, and angry at Cushing's heavy-handed response to the bombing, Serena forges orders from her husband to have him arrested for treason and apostasy. Cushing is taken to prison "on Waterford's word" (executive order), with Waterford eventually replacing him as the head of the Council and Gilead's leader. Cushing is the only politician to establish a semi-dictatorial regime in Gilead, although only for a few days. In fact, his excessive power and authoritarianism were feared by the other Commanders.
- Isaac (portrayed by Rohan Mead) is a Guardian assigned to the Waterford home.
- Eleanor Lawrence (portrayed by Julie Dretzin) is Commander Lawrence's long-suffering wife. She later commits suicide by overdosing on her medication.
- Holly Maddox (portrayed by Cherry Jones) is June's mother, an outspoken feminist. Jones was cast in January 2018.
- Sylvia (portrayed by Clea DuVall) is Emily's wife, who managed to leave the United States with their child before Gilead was installed.

=== Introduced in season 3 ===
- Natalie (portrayed by Ashleigh LaThrop) is a devoted Handmaid whose loyalty to Gilead causes divisive tensions amongst her peers.
- Sienna (portrayed by Sugenja Sri) is a Martha at the Lawrence home.
- George Winslow (portrayed by Christopher Meloni) is a High Commander stationed in Washington, D.C. Winslow is killed by June when he tries to rape her.

=== Introduced in season 4 ===
- Esther Keyes (portrayed by Mckenna Grace) is the teenage wife of an older commander.
- Oona (portrayed by Zawe Ashton) is Moira's girlfriend.

=== Introduced in season 5 ===
- Alanis Wheeler (portrayed by Genevieve Angelson)
- Ryan Wheeler (portrayed by Lucas Neff) is Alanis' husband
- Rose Blaine (portrayed by Carey Cox) is Nick's wife
- Ezra Shaw (portrayed by Rossif Sutherland) is a security guard in Gilead
- Commander Mackenzie (portrayed by Jason Butler Harner) is the adoptive father of June's daughter Hannah, now known as Agnes. He also appears in The Testaments.

=== Introduced in season 6 ===
- Aunt Phoebe/Ava (portrayed by D'Arcy Carden), an Aunt at the Rachel and Leah Centre who assists Mayday's plot to kill Boston's Commanders. She later tells June that her name is Ava and that she is a CIA agent.
- Commander Bell (portrayed by Timothy Simons) is a young, ambitious and sadistic Commander who takes Janine Lindo as his Handmaid. He is killed by June during the massacre of the Boston Commanders by the Handmaids.

== Guest characters ==
The following is a supplementary list of guest stars that appear in lesser roles, make significant cameo appearances or who receive co-starring credit over multiple appearances.

=== Introduced in season 1 ===
- Mrs. Castillo (portrayed by Zabryna Guevara) is an ambassador from Mexico who visits Gilead to see the effectiveness of the regime.
- Mr. Flores (portrayed by Christian Barillas) is Mrs. Castillo's assistant.

=== Introduced in season 2 ===
- Mrs. O'Conner (portrayed by Marisa Tomei) is a Commander's wife sent to the colonies as punishment for having sex with another man. She is poisoned by Emily and dies in the colonies. Tomei was cast in January 2018.
- Omar (portrayed by Yahya Abdul-Mateen II) is a man who helps June attempt to escape. He is secretly a practicing Muslim. He does not return from church, nor does his family. He is later revealed to June by Aunt Lydia hanging on the wall, and his wife and son were separated, his son is given new parents and his wife is forced to be a handmaid, as punishment for his helping June.
- Dan (portrayed by John Carroll Lynch) is Emily's boss at the university where she worked.
- Annie (portrayed by Kelly Jenrette) is Luke's ex-wife, who stalked June in an attempt to make her give up on him.
- Odette Johnson (portrayed by Rebecca Rittenhouse) is the doctor who helped Moira during her surrogacy and later became her fiancée. Moira eventually learns that Odette was murdered by Gilead for being a lesbian.

=== Introduced in season 3 ===
- Jim (portrayed by John Ortiz) is the principal of the school where Aunt Lydia taught before Gilead.
- Noelle (portrayed by Emily Althaus) is a young single mother whose son Aunt Lydia taught before the rise of Gilead.

=== Introduced in season 4 ===
- Daisy (portrayed by Laura Vandervoort) is a Jezebel worker who aids June.
- Lieutenant Stans (portrayed by Reed Birney) is a Gilead officer who interrogates June.
- Steven (portrayed by Omar Maskati) is the leader of a resistance group in Chicago.
- Aunt Irene (portrayed by Carly Street) is a former aunt who escaped to Canada as a refugee now going by the name Iris. She was responsible for the mutilation of Emily and the hanging of the Martha with whom Emily was having an affair. She seeks forgiveness from Emily but when she doesn't receive it, she hangs herself.
