= Metropolitan Filmexport =

French film distribution company

- Type: Private
- Industry: Film industry
- Founded: 26 July 1978; 48 years ago
- Founder: Samuel Hadida; Victor Hadida; David Hadida
- Headquarters: 29 Rue Galilée, 16th arrondissement, Paris, France
- Divisions: Seven Sept; HK Vidéo; Cinémas à la demande; UniversCiné
- Subsidiaries: Davis Films
- Website: metrofilms.com

Metropolitan Filmexport is a French film distribution company founded in 1978 by brothers Samuel and Victor Hadida along with their father David.

It is best known as the French distributor of the Evil Dead, (Note: Excluding Evil Dead II, originally distributed by Splendor Films; that film's rights are currently owned by StudioCanal in France.) Resident Evil, Saw and Hunger Games franchises. The company was the main French distributor of New Line Cinema productions, including the Nightmare on Elm Street and Lord of the Rings franchises, until the end of their deal in 2009 with the French division of Warner Bros. taking over. It is also the main distributor for Lionsgate Films in France.

The company also co-produce films through its subsidiary Davis Films. Some of its productions include the Resident Evil and Silent Hill film series, True Romance (1993), Domino (2005) and The Black Dahlia (2006).

== History ==
Among its subsidiaries, Seven Sept distributes video media to video stores and newsagents, as well as through traditional channels and online sales of DVDs and Blu-rays, and HK Video (specializing in Asian cinema).

In the video-on-demand market, Metropolitan Filmexport primarily controls the UniversCiné service as well as its own "Cinema(s) on Demand" platform, available on major Internet service providers' boxes and accessible directly online.

The company distributes, both in theaters and on video, films produced by Dino De Laurentiis Company, Turner Entertainment Co., Hammer Films, Lionsgate, and New Line Cinema (until the latter's full takeover by Warner Bros.).

Renowned for its catalog of action, fantasy and thriller films, the French company also co-produces or distributes films aimed at a less popular target audience, sometimes rewarded by critics or prizes, such as Border, Un Certain Regard prize at the 2018 Cannes Film Festival, or Green Book, awarded three Oscars including Best Picture in 2019.

== Distribution ==
Metropolitan Filmexport currently distributes or has distributed all or some of the following companies' films:

=== Current distribution deals ===
- STX Entertainment
- A24
- Lionsgate Studios
- Annapurna Pictures
- Lantern Entertainment
- Amblin Partners
- Beacon Pictures
- Bleecker Street
- Davis Films
- Intermedia
- Millennium Media
- Open Road Films (formerly Global Road Entertainment from 2017 to 2019)

=== Former distribution deals ===
- New Line Cinema – Warner Bros. took direct control in 2009.
- Relativity Media/Rogue Pictures – went bankrupt as a mini-major in 2015.
- Broad Green Pictures – Shut down its production unit in 2017 and then shut down completely in 2018.
- CBS Films – Lionsgate took over distribution in 2015.
- Fine Line Features/Picturehouse – Part of New Line Cinema and shut down between 2005 and 2008.
- The Weinstein Co. – plagued by the Harvey Weinstein sexual abuse scandal.
- Samuel Goldwyn Films

== Films ==
The release years indicated in those lists corresponds to the release year in France and may differ from the release year in the country of origin.

=== 1970-90 ===
Year	Title	Ref(s)
1978	Game of Death	
1981	Polyester	
1983	The Evil Dead	
1986	A Nightmare on Elm Street	
1986	A Nightmare on Elm Street 2: Freddy's Revenge	
1986	Insignificance	
1987	A Nightmare on Elm Street 3: Dream Warriors	
1987	City on Fire	
1988	Itinerary of a Spoiled Child	
1988	A Chinese Ghost Story	
1989	A Nightmare on Elm Street 4: The Dream Master	
1990	Heart Condition	
1990	A Nightmare on Elm Street 5: The Dream Child	
1990	Lionheart	
1991	Point Break	
1992	Freddy's Dead: The Final Nightmare	
1992	A Chinese Ghost Story II	
1992	Reservoir Dogs	
1993	A Chinese Ghost Story III	
1993	Bullet in the Head	
1993	Only the Strong	
1993	True Romance	
1994	Army of Darkness	
1994	Jason Goes to Hell: The Final Friday	
1994	Killing Zoe	
1994	Corrina, Corrina	
1995	In the Mouth of Madness	
1995	Wes Craven's New Nightmare	
1995	Mortal Kombat	
1995	The Killer	
1996	Seven	
1996	Crying Freeman	
1996	Bed of Roses	
1996	The Adventures of Pinocchio	
1997	Nirvana	
1997	Curdled	
1997	First Strike	
1997	The Adventures of Pinocchio	
1997	Freeway	
1998	Mortal Kombat Annihilation	
1998	Wag the Dog	
1998	An American Werewolf in Paris	
1998	Blade	
1998	Most Wanted	
1998	Lost in Space	
1999	Rush Hour	
1999	Pleasantville	
1999	Cube	
1999	Legionnaire	
1999	The Big Brass Ring	
1999	Pecker	
1999	Freeway II: Confessions of a Trickbaby	
1999	Rhinoceros Hunting in Budapest	
1999	The Red Violin	
1999	End of Days	

=== 2000 ===
Year	Title	Ref(s)
2000	The Legend of 1900	
2000	Tumbleweeds	
2000	Drop Dead Gorgeous	
2000	Body Shots	
2000	Magnolia	
2000	Sunshine	
2000	The Hurricane	
2000	Frequency	
2000	The Bachelor	
2000	Blast from the Past	
2000	American Psycho	
2000	Boiler Room	
2000	The Cell	
2000	The Little Vampire	
2000	Little Nicky	
2000	Final Destination	
2000	The Family Man	
2001	Lost Souls	
2001	Brotherhood of the Wolf	
2001	Bring It On	
2001	Rush Hour 2	
2001	15 Minutes	
2001	Replicant	
2001	Bamboozled	
2001	Town & Country	
2001	The Anniversary Party	
2001	Blow	
2001	Thirteen Days	
2001	Hedwig and the Angry Inch	
2001	Everybody's Famous!	
2001	Harvard Man	
2001	The Lord of the Rings: The Fellowship of the Ring	
2002	Spy Game	
2002	Blade II	
2002	Resident Evil	
2002	Life as a House	
2002	John Q.	
2002	Monster's Ball	
2002	I Am Sam	
2002	Shaolin Soccer	
2002	We Were Soldiers	
2002	Bones	
2002	Inferno	
2002	Cube 2: Hypercube	
2002	Dancing at the Blue Iguana	
2002	The 51st State	
2002	Sweat	
2002	Jason X	
2002	Break of Dawn	
2002	Spider	
2002	Austin Powers in Goldmember	
2002	Simone	
2002	Bend It Like Beckham	
2002	Welcome to Collinwood	
2002	The Lord of the Rings: The Two Towers	
2003	Intacto	
2003	The Rules of Attraction	
2003	The Emperor's Club	
2003	My Big Fat Greek Wedding	
2003	Unconditional Love	
2003	White Oleander	
2003	Das Experiment	
2003	Dark Blue	
2003	A Man Apart	
2003	Dumb and Dumberer: When Harry Met Lloyd	
2003	About Schmidt	
2003	Final Destination 2	
2003	Secretary	
2003	Confidence	
2003	Freddy vs. Jason	
2003	Northfork	
2003	The Real Cancun	
2003	Sympathy for Mr. Vengeance	
2003	Willard	
2003	Elf	
2003	The Lord of the Rings: The Return of the King	
2004	Cabin Fever	
2004	The Texas Chainsaw Massacre	
2004	Secondhand Lions	
2004	Cube Zero	
2004	Monster	
2004	Turn Left at the End of the World	
2004	The Butterfly Effect	
2004	Godsend	
2004	Mambo Italiano	
2004	Dawn of the Dead	
2004	Open Water	
2004	Cabin Fever	
2004	Shade	
2004	Oldboy	
2004	Resident Evil: Apocalypse	
2004	Highwaymen	
2004	Five Children and It	
2004	Jason Goes to Hell: The Final Friday	
2004	The Notebook	
2004	Blade: Trinity	
2004	Mean Creek	
2004	Cellular	
2004	Birth	
2004	The Grudge	
2005	The Phantom of the Opera	
2005	Saw	
2005	After the Sunset	
2005	The Final Cut	
2005	Hotel Rwanda	
2005	The Bridge of San Luis Rey	
2005	Hostage	
2005	Wedding Crashers	
2005	Assault on Precinct 13	
2005	The Upside of Anger	
2005	Turn Left at the End of the World	
2005	Battle of the Brave	
2005	Monster-in-Law	
2005	Inside Deep Throat	
2005	One Missed Call	
2005	A Dirty Shame	
2005	New Police Story	
2005	Saw II	
2005	Lady Vengeance	
2005	The Adventures of Sharkboy and Lavagirl	
2005	Crash	
2005	The Brothers Grimm	
2005	A History of Violence	
2005	The Devil's Rejects	
2005	Domino	
Grizzly Man		
2006	The Libertine	
2006	The Man	
2006	Good Night, and Good Luck	
2006	Down in the Valley	
2006	Basic Instinct 2	
2006	The New World	
2006	Running Scared	
2006	The Aura	
2006	Take the Lead	
2006	16 Blocks	
2006	Final Destination 3	
2006	Silent Hill	
2006	Snakes on a Plane	
2006	Bubble	
2006	Edison	
2006	Green Street	
2006	Lucky Number Slevin	
2006	Lassie	
2006	Hard Candy	
2006	Find Me Guilty	
2006	Dave Chappelle's Block Party	
2006	Perfume: The Story of a Murderer	
2006	Stormbreaker	
2006	The Black Dahlia	
2006	Saw III	
2006	The Nativity Story	
2006	The Grudge 2	
2007	Fur: An Imaginary Portrait of Diane Arbus	
2007	Little Children	
2007	The Illusionist	
2007	Bug	
2007	The Painted Veil	
2007	The Texas Chainsaw Massacre: The Beginning	
2007	Alpha Dog	
2007	The Number 23	
2007	The Messengers	
2007	Fracture	
2007	88 Minutes	
2007	You Kill Me	
2007	The Last Mimzy	
2007	Lonely Hearts	
2007	The Hoax	
2007	Tenacious D in The Pick of Destiny	
2007	The Contract	
2007	Finding Rin Tin Tin	
2007	Kaidan	
2007	War	
2007	Hairspray	
2007	King of California	
2007	Shoot 'Em Up	
2007	Resident Evil: Extinction	
2007	Rush Hour 3	
2007	Saw IV	
2007	Eastern Promises	
2007	The Golden Compass	
2007	Love in the Time of Cholera	
2008	Rendition	
2008	Death Sentence	
2008	Rambo	
2008	Mr. Magorium's Wonder Emporium	
2008	Deliver Us from Evil	
2008	Mongol	
2008	Chapter 27	
2008	Run Fatboy Run	
2008	Sex and the City	
2008	Semi-Pro	
2008	Battle in Seattle	
2008	The U.S. vs. John Lennon	
2008	Beaufort	
2008	The Children of Huang Shi	
2008	Journey to the Center of the Earth	
2008	Alatriste	
2008	The Bank Job	
2008	Balls of Fury	
2008	Kung Fu Dunk	
2008	The Accidental Husband	
2008	Sand and Sorrow	
2008	Righteous Kill	
2008	W.	
2008	Saw V	
2008	Mr. Woodcock	
2008	The Life Before Her Eyes	
2008	Harold & Kumar Escape from Guantanamo Bay	
2008	Appaloosa	
2008	The Baader Meinhof Complex	
2008	Pride and Glory	
2008	City of Ember	
2008	Roman Polanski: Wanted and Desired	
2008	Four Christmases	
2009	Defiance	
2009	Religulous	
2009	Inkheart	
2009	He's Just Not That Into You	
2009	Passengers	
2009	The Grudge 3	
2009	The Final Destination	
2009	17 Again	
2009	Red Cliff	
2009	Horsemen	
2009	My Bloody Valentine 3D	
2009	The Secret of Moonacre	
2009	Departures	
2009	Drag Me to Hell	
2009	The Girlfriend Experience	
2009	The Young Victoria	
2009	Martian Child	
2009	Ghosts of Girlfriends Past	
2009	The Midnight Meat Train	
2009	My Best Friend's Girl	
2009	District 9	
2009	My Sister's Keeper	
2009	I'm Glad My Mother Is Alive	
2009	Fame	
2009	Silk	
2009	Saw VI	
2009	The Imaginarium of Doctor Parnassus	
2009	The Road	
2009	The Time Traveler's Wife	
2009	Solomon Kane	

=== 2010 ===
Year	Title	Ref(s)
2010	Whip It	
2010	The Book of Eli	
2010	Edge of Darkness	
2010	An Education	
2010	Bad Lieutenant: Port of Call New Orleans	
2010	Dear John	
2010	New York, I Love You	
2010	Kick-Ass	
2010	Brooklyn's Finest	
2010	StreetDance 3D	
2010	Carriers	
2010	Hachi: A Dog's Tale	
2010	Killers	
2010	The Spy Next Door	
2010	Vicky the Viking	
2010	The Fourth Kind	
2010	Crossing Over	
2010	The Expendables	
2010	The Switch	
2010	The Runaways	
2010	Resident Evil: Afterlife	
2010	Let Me In	
2010	Alpha and Omega	
2010	Saw 3D	
2010	Outrage	
2010	The Next Three Days	
2010	We Are the Night	
2011	Season of the Witch	
2011	The Way Back	
2011	Animals United	
2011	Sanctum	
2011	The Fighter	
2011	Drive Angry	
2011	The Mechanic	
2011	The Eagle	
2011	Stone	
2011	The Lincoln Lawyer	
2011	London Boulevard	
2011	Blitz	
2011	Beastly	
2011	Ironclad	
2011	The Resident	
2011	Conan the Barbarian	
2011	Cave of Forgotten Dreams	
2011	Warrior	
2011	Shark Night	
2011	Abduction	
2011	The Ides of March	
2011	50/50	
2011	Immortals	
2011	The Rum Diary	
2011	Hugo	
2011	Texas Killing Fields	
2011	Dix Jours en or	
2012	Trust	
2012	One for the Money	
2012	In the Land of Blood and Honey	
2012	The Grey	
2012	The Woman in Black	
2012	The Hunger Games	
2012	Mirror Mirror	
2012	Salmon Fishing in the Yemen	
2012	The Cabin in the Woods	
2012	StreetDance 2	
2012	Gone	
2012	What to Expect When You're Expecting	
2012	Chernobyl Diaries	
2012	Trespass	
2012	Friends with Kids	
2012	The Expendables 2	
2012	Hit and Run	
2012	Lawless	
2012	Resident Evil: Retribution	
2012	Hope Springs	
2012	The Paperboy	
2012	End of Watch	
2012	Silent Hill: Revelation	
2012	Killing Them Softly	
2012	Arbitrage	
2012	Alex Cross	
2012	The Possession	
2013	The Master	
2013	The Last Stand	
2013	Gambit	
2013	Bullet to the Head	
2013	To the Wonder	
2013	Warm Bodies	
2013	Dead Man Down	
2013	The Host	
2013	The Land of Hope	
2013	Evil Dead	
2013	Snitch	
2013	The Big Wedding	
2013	The Iceman	
2013	Movie 43	
2013	Rampart	
2013	Hummingbird	
2013	A Late Quartet	
2013	Stolen	
2013	Texas Chainsaw 3D	
2013	Adventures in Zambezia	
2013	Jobs	
2013	Red Dawn	
2013	The Butler	
2013	Riddick	
2013	Parkland	
2013	As I Lay Dying	
2013	Ender's Game	
2013	The Hunger Games: Catching Fire	
2013	The Fifth Estate	
2013	The Wolf of Wall Street	
2014	Out of the Furnace	
2014	I, Frankenstein	
2014	American Hustle	
2014	Tarzan	
2014	Vampire Academy	
2014	The Legend of Hercules	
2014	Need for Speed	
2014	Khumba	
2014	Sabotage	
2014	Walk of Shame	
2014	The Rover	
2014	The Railway Man	
2014	Nurse 3D	
2014	Big Bad Wolves	
2014	Locke	
2014	Earth to Echo	
2014	The Expendables 3	
2014	The Hundred-Foot Journey	
2014	Sin City: A Dame to Kill For	
2014	Horns	
2014	A Walk Among the Tombstones	
2014	John Wick	
2014	The Hunger Games: Mockingjay – Part 1	
2014	Kill the Messenger	
2014	Dumb and Dumber To	
2015	The Woman in Black: Angel of Death	
2015	Mortdecai	
2015	It Follows	
2015	Tracers	
2015	The Lazarus Effect	
2015	The Humbling	
2015	She's Funny That Way	
2015	A Little Chaos	
2015	Maggie	
2015	The Taking of Tiger Mountain	
2015	The Vatican Tapes	
2015	American Ultra	
2015	Pawn Sacrifice	
2015	The Scent of Mandarin	
2015	Sicario	
2015	Regression	
2015	The Hunger Games: Mockingjay – Part 2	
2015	Knight of Cups	
2015	Un plus une	
2016	A Walk in the Woods	
2016	The Boy	
2016	Dirty Grandpa	
2016	My Big Fat Greek Wedding 2	
2016	Hardcore Henry	
2016	Everybody Wants Some!!	
2016	Criminal	
2016	Fanny's Journey	
2016	The Wailing	
2016	The BFG	
2016	Bad Moms	
2016	Nerve	
2016	Mechanic: Resurrection	
2016	Free State of Jones	
2016	Blair Witch	
2016	The Light Between Oceans	
2016	The Girl on the Train	
2016	Hacksaw Ridge	
2016	Masterminds	
2016	Office Christmas Party	
2017	A Monster Calls	
2017	Resident Evil: The Final Chapter	
2017	Silence	
2017	John Wick: Chapter 2	
2017	Patriots Day	
2017	Everyone's Life	
2017	Power Rangers	
2017	A Dog's Purpose	
2017	Chuck	
2017	The Wall	
2017	Free Fire	
2017	Loue-moi !	
2017	Song to Song	
2017	Buena Vista Social Club: Adios	
2017	The Hitman's Bodyguard	
2017	Wind River	
2017	American Assassin	
2017	The Glass Castle	
2017	My Little Pony: The Movie	
2017	Jigsaw	
2017	The Foreigner	
2017	Wonderstruck	
2017	A Bad Moms Christmas	
2017	Suburbicon	
2017	Wonder	
2017	All the Money in the World	
2017	Leatherface	
2018	Last Flag Flying	
2018	12 Strong	
2018	Stronger	
2018	Den of Thieves	
2018	Marrowbone	
2018	Hostiles	
2018	The Battleship Island	
2018	Don't Worry, He Won't Get Far on Foot	
2018	Gringo	
2018	Love Addict	
2018	Hereditary	
2018	Sicario: Day of the Soldado	
2018	Adrift	
2018	Hotel Artemis	
2018	The Spy Who Dumped Me	
2018	Terminal	
2018	Papillon	
2018	Mile 22	
2018	Peppermint	
2018	The Happytime Murders	
2018	A Simple Favor	
2018	Blindspotting	
2018	Belleville Cop	
2018	The Spy Gone North	
2018	Suspiria	
2018	Robin Hood	
2018	Hunter Killer	
2018	Second Act	
2019	Amundsen	
2019	Border	
2019	Green Book	
2019	Beautiful Boy	
2019	Stan & Ollie	
2019	Captive State	
2019	Missing Link	
2019	Hellboy	
2019	The Best Years of a Life	
2019	John Wick: Chapter 3 – Parabellum	
2019	I Still See You	
2019	Amazing Grace	
2019	Greta	
2019	Teen Spirit	
2019	Five Feet Apart	
2019	UglyDolls	
2019	Dragged Across Concrete	
2019	Midsommar	
2019	The Gangster, the Cop, the Devil	
2019	Scary Stories to Tell in the Dark	
2019	Andy	
2019	Lucky Day	
2019	Rambo: Last Blood	
2019	Sisters in Arms	
2019	Hustlers	
2019	High Strung: Free Dance	
2019	Midway	
2019	Countdown	
2019	Knives Out	

=== 2020 ===
Year	Title	Ref(s)
2020	21 Bridges	
2020	Bombshell	
2020	Brahms: The Boy II	
2020	The Climb	
2020	Greenland	
2020	Lying and Stealing	
2020	The Rental	
2020	Antebellum	
2020	Blackbird	
2020	Honest Thief	
2020	The Outpost	
2020	Max Steel	
2020	Songbird	
2021	My Son	
2021	Crisis	
2021	Boss Level	
2021	Falling	
2021	The United States vs. Billie Holiday	
2021	Wrath of Man	
2021	Hitman's Wife's Bodyguard	
2021	Shadow in the Cloud	
2021	The Mauritanian	
2021	The Reckoning	
2021	Werewolves Within	
2021	Chaos Walking	
2021	Spiral	
2021	The Ice Road	
2021	Till Death	
2021	Wrong Turn	
2021	Summertime	
2021	Pig	
2021	Resident Evil: Welcome to Raccoon City	
2021	Monster Family 2	
2022	C'mon C'mon	
2022	Moonfall	
2022	Blacklight	
2022	Freaks Out	
2022	The Unbearable Weight of Massive Talent	
2022	Crimes of the Future	
2022	La Traversée	
2022	Silent Night	
2022	Men	
2022	Jeepers Creepers: Reborn	
2022	Holy Spider	
2022	Orphan: First Kill	
2022	Three Thousand Years of Longing	
2022	Prey for the Devil	
2022	Broker	
2022	Living	
2023	Diabolik	
2023	The Offering	
2023	Plane	
2023	Three Wishes for Cinderella	
2023	Marlowe	
2023	John Wick: Chapter 4	
2023	1Up	
2023	Monstrous	
2023	Evil Dead Rise	
2023	To Catch a Killer	
2023	The Last Emperor	re-release
2023	About My Father	
2023	Joy Ride	
2023	Memento	re-release
2023	Cobweb	
2023	Reality	
2023	Coup de chance	
2023	Expend4bles	
2023	Naked Lunch	re-release
2023	Saw X	
2023	Flo	
2023	The Hunger Games: The Ballad of Songbirds & Snakes	
2023	Dumb Money	
2023	Dear David	
2024	The Iron Claw	
2024	Race for Glory: Audi vs. Lancia	
2024	Imaginary	
2024	In the Land of Saints and Sinners	
2024	Immaculate	
2024	Asphalt City	
2024	Civil War	
2024	The Dead Don't Hurt	
2024	The Strangers: Chapter 1	
2024	Memory	
2024	Love Lies Bleeding	
2024	Horizon: An American Saga – Chapter 1	
2024	Longlegs	
2024	Twilight of the Warriors: Walled In	
2024	The Crow	
2024	The Bricklayer	
2024	Boy Kills World	
2024	Tatami	
2024	Never Let Go	
2024	The Apprentice	
2024	The Substance	
2024	Finalement	
2025	Den of Thieves 2: Pantera	
2025	Miller's Girl	
2025	Flight Risk	
2025	Sing Sing	
2025	The Monkey	
2025	In the Lost Lands	
2025	Christiane F.	re-release
2025	Reading Lolita in Tehran	
2025	Locked	
2025	On Swift Horses	
2025	Shadow Force	
2025	Hurry Up Tomorrow	
2025	Hot Milk	
2025	Ballerina	
2025	Köln 75	
2025	Eddington	
2025	Together	
2025	Splitsville	
2025	Bride Hard	
2025	The Ice Tower	
2025	The Long Walk	
2025	A Pale View of Hills	
2025	The Strangers – Chapter 2	
2025	The Wave	
2025	Shelby Oaks	
2025	Eternity	
2025	Keeper	
2025	The Housemaid	
2026	Greenland 2: Migration	
2026	Dreams	
2026	Return to Silent Hill	
2026	Marty Supreme	
2026	Christy	
2026	Whistle	
2026	The Drama	
2026	Good Luck, Have Fun, Don't Die	
2026	Tuner	
2026	The Furious	
2026	Backrooms	
2026	The Death of Robin Hood	
2026	Evil Dead Burn	
2026	I Want Your Sex	
2026	The Rivals of Amziah King	
2026	Red Sonja	Direct-to-video
2026	Resident Evil	
2026	Primetime	
2026	Wicker	
2026	Hellboy: The Crooked Man	Direct-to-video
2026	Club Kid	
2026	The Strangers – Chapter 3	Direct-to-video
2026	The Hunger Games: Sunrise on the Reaping	
2026	Wildwood	
2026	I Play Rocky	
2026	You Can See Everything	
2027	The Debut	
2027	Artificial	
2027	Wife & Dog	
2028	Evil Dead Wrath	
