= Samuel Hadida =

Moroccan film producer (1953–2018)

- Born: 17 December 1953; Casablanca, Morocco
- Died: 26 November 2018 (aged 64); Santa Monica, California, U.S

Samuel Hadida (17 December 1953 – 26 November 2018) was a Moroccan-born French film producer.

== Early life ==
Hadida was born in Casablanca, Morocco.

== Career ==
In 1978, he co-founded the company Metropolitan Filmexport with his brother Victor. The company later became a successful independent distributor of films in the French-speaking world. Metropolitan Filmexport is the current French distributor for films by Lionsgate and, formerly, New Line Cinema (Warner Bros. now releases New Line films).

In 1990, Hadida formed a new company, Davis Films. Since 1993, the company has produced more than thirty Hollywood films, with True Romance being the first.

Though Hadida contributed to the film industry over many decades, his work in spearheading the Resident Evil film franchise is what he is best known for. When Hadida learned the project was struggling, he reached out Constantin Film and offered a 50/50 venture deal. This project, as well as his work with the film adaptation of Silent Hill, has contributed to his recognition within the realm of video game adaptations.

== Death ==
Hadida died at the UCLA Santa Monica Hospital after a short illness. Return to Silent Hill was dedicated to his memory.

== Controversy ==
In 2011, Davis Films signed an agreement to create a film adaptation of the book series House of Night. Hadida and his company did not follow through on producing the film, yet retained the rights until 2020. This upset the series' fanbase, causing tension between Hadida and the series' authors, P. C. Cast and Kristin Cast.

== Filmography ==
Producer

- Only the Strong (1993)
- True Romance (1993)
- Killing Zoe (1993)
- Necronomicon (1993)
- Crying Freeman (1995)
- Freeway (1996)
- The Adventures of Pinocchio (1996)
- Rhinoceros Hunting in Budapest (1996)
- Nirvana (1997)
- Inferno (1999)
- Brotherhood of the Wolf (2001)
- Laguna (2001)
- Resident Evil (2002)
- Spider (2002)
- Sweat (2002)
- Break of Dawn (2002)
- Gift from Above (2003)
- Turn Left at the End of the World (2004)
- Five Children and It (2004)
- Battle of the Brave (2004)
- The Bridge of San Luis Rey (2004)
- The Aura (2005)
- Domino (2005)
- Lassie (2005)
- Silent Hill (2006)
- Moscow Zero (2006)
- 88 Minutes (2007)
- Resident Evil: Extinction (2007)
- The Secret of Moonacre (2008)
- The Imaginarium of Doctor Parnassus (2009)
- Solomon Kane (2009)
- Resident Evil: Afterlife (2010)
- 10 jours en or (2012)
- Resident Evil: Retribution (2012)
- Silent Hill: Revelation (2012)
- The Expendables 3 (2014)
- Un plus une (2015)
- Fanny's Journey (2016)
- Resident Evil: The Final Chapter (2016)
- Everyone's Life (2017)
- Loue-moi! (2017)
- Everyone's Life (2017)
- Love Addict (2018)
- Belleville Cop (2018)
- La voix humaine (2018)
- Sisters in Arms (2019) (posthumous release)
- The Best Years of a Life (2019) (posthumous release)
- Lucky Day (2019) (posthumous release)
- The Crow (2024) (posthumous release)

Executive producer

- The Expert (1995)
- Legionnaire (1998)
- The Big Brass Ring (1999)
- Freeway II: Confessions of a Trickbaby (1999)
- Dancing at the Blue Iguana (2000)
- The Rules of Attraction (2002)
- Resident Evil: Apocalypse (2004)
- Good Night, and Good Luck (2005)
- The Black Dahlia (2006)
- Perfume: The Story of a Murderer (2006)
- Mr. Magorium’s Wonder Emporium (2007)
- Blitz (2011)
- Conan the Barbarian (2011)
- Salmon Fishing in the Yemen (2011)
- The Railway Man (2013)
- Sin City: A Dame to Kill For (2014)
- The Scent of Mandarin (2015)
- Criminal (2016)
- Mechanic: Resurrection (2016)
- The Hitman's Bodyguard (2017)
- Papillon (2017)
- Hunter Killer (2018)
- Rambo: Last Blood (2019) (posthumous release)
