= Davis Films =

French independent film production company

- Type: Subsidiary
- Industry: Film industry
- Founded: 1990; 36 years ago
- Founder: Samuel Hadida
- Headquarters: 29 Rue Galilée, 16th arrondissement, Paris, France
- Parent: Metropolitan Filmexport

Davis Films is a French independent film production company founded by Samuel Hadida in 1990, and a subsidiary of his distribution company Metropolitan Filmexport.

It is best known for producing the Resident Evil and Silent Hill film series adapted from video games. It has been acting since the 1990s in partnership with other independent film companies in Hollywood, including Lionsgate, New Line Cinema, Screen Gems and Millennium Media. They were also in partnership with bigger Hollywood companies as well, Universal Pictures, Warner Bros. Pictures, Paramount Pictures, 20th Century Studios, DreamWorks Pictures and Columbia Pictures.

== Films ==
Year	Film	Distributor	Notes
1993	Only the Strong	20th Century Fox (United States); PolyGram Filmed Entertainment (International); Metropolitan Filmexport (France)	
1993	True Romance	Warner Bros. Pictures (United States); Metropolitan Filmexport (France)	
1993	Killing Zoe	October Films (United States); Metropolitan Filmexport (France)	
1993	Necronomicon	New Line Cinema (United States); BAC Films (France); Pioneer LDC (Japan)	
1995	The Expert	New City Releasing (United States)	
1995	Crying Freeman	Metropolitan Filmexport (France)	
1996	Freeway	Republic Pictures (United States); Metropolitan Filmexport (France)	
1996	The Adventures of Pinocchio	New Line Cinema (United States); Barrandov Biografia (Czech Republic); Metropolitan Filmexport (France); PolyGram Filmed Entertainment (United Kingdom & Benelux); CineVox (through Warner Bros. Pictures; Germany & Austria)	France only; Uncredited in the US
1997	Rhinoceros Hunting in Budapest	Metropolitan Filmexport (France)	
1997	Nirvana	Cecchi Gori Distribution (Italy); Metropolitan Filmexport (France)	
1998	Legionnaire	Sterling Home Entertainment (United States); Metropolitan Filmexport (France)	France only; Uncredited in the US
1999	The Big Brass Ring	Millennium Films (United States)	Uncredited; under Samuel Hadida
1999	Inferno	Sony Pictures Home Entertainment (United States); Metropolitan Filmexport (France)	France only; Uncredited in the US
1999	Freeway II: Confessions of a Trickbaby	Full Moon Features (United States)	
2001	Brotherhood of the Wolf	Metropolitan Filmexport (France); Focus Features (United States)	
2002	Resident Evil	Constantin Film (Germany); Pathé and FilmFour (United Kingdom); Sony Pictures Releasing (United States); Metropolitan Filmexport (France)	
2002	Sweat	Metropolitan Filmexport (France)	
2002	Spider	Odeon Films (Canada); Helkon UK (United Kingdom); Metropolitan Filmexport (France)	
2004	Turn Left at the End of the World	Metro Communications (Israel); Metropolitan Filmexport (France)	
2004	Resident Evil: Apocalypse	Constantin Film (Germany); Metropolitan Filmexport (France); Alliance Atlantis (Canada); Sony Pictures Releasing (United States and United Kingdom)	
2004	Five Children and It	Metropolitan Filmexport (France)	
2004	Battle of the Brave	Pathé (United Kingdom); Warner Home Video; Metropolitan Filmexport (France); Capitol Films (International)	
2004	The Bridge of San Luis Rey	Metropolitan Filmexport (France); Sony Pictures Releasing (Spain)	
2005	Good Night, and Good Luck	Warner Independent Pictures (United States); Redbus Film Distribution (United Kingdom); Metropolitan Filmexport (France); Tohokushinsha (Japan)	
2005	The Aura	Buena Vista International (Argentina); Metropolitan Filmexport (France)	
2005	Domino	Metropolitan Filmexport (France); New Line Cinema (United States); Entertainment Film Distributors (United Kingdom); Summit Entertainment (International)	
2005	Lassie	Entertainment Film Distributors (United Kingdom); Roadside Attractions and IDP Distribution (United States); Metropolitan Filmexport (France)	
2006	Silent Hill	Alliance Atlantis (Canada); Metropolitan Filmexport (France); Sony Pictures Releasing (United States)	
2006	Perfume: The Story of a Murderer	Constantin Film (Germany); Metropolitan Filmexport (France); Filmax (Spain); DreamWorks Pictures and Paramount Pictures (United States); Summit Entertainment (International)	
2006	The Black Dahlia	Universal Pictures (United States); Metropolitan Filmexport (France); Warner Bros. Pictures (Germany)	France only; Uncredited in the US
2007	Resident Evil: Extinction	Constantin Film (Germany); Alliance Atlantis (Canada); Metropolitan Filmexport (France); Sony Pictures Releasing (United States and United Kingdom)	
2009	The Imaginarium of Doctor Parnassus	Lionsgate UK (United Kingdom); Metropolitan Filmexport (France); E1 Entertainment (Canada)	
2009	Solomon Kane	Metropolitan Filmexport (France); Entertainment Film Distributors (United Kingdom); Radius-TWC (United States)	
2010	Resident Evil: Afterlife	Constantin Film (Germany); Sony Pictures Releasing (United States and United Kingdom); Alliance Films (Canada); Metropolitan Filmexport (France)	
2011	Blitz	Lionsgate UK (United Kingdom); Metropolitan Filmexport (France)	
2011	Conan the Barbarian	Lionsgate Films (United States); Metropolitan Filmexport (France)	France only; Uncredited in the US
2011	Salmon Fishing in the Yemen	Lionsgate UK (United Kingdom); Metropolitan Filmexport (France)	
2012	Resident Evil: Retribution	Constantin Film (Germany); Sony Pictures Releasing (United States); Alliance Films (Canada); Metropolitan Filmexport (France)	
2012	Silent Hill: Revelation	Alliance Films (Canada); Metropolitan Filmexport (France); Lionsgate Films (United States)	
2013	The Railway Man	Paramount Pictures and Transmission Films (Australia); Ascot Elite Entertainment Group (Switzerland); Metropolitan Filmexport (France); Lionsgate UK (United Kingdom)	
2014	The Expendables 3	Lionsgate Films (United States); Metropolitan Filmexport (France)	France only; Uncredited in the US
2014	Sin City: A Dame to Kill For	Dimension Films (United States); Metropolitan Filmexport (France)	France only; Uncredited in the US
2015	The Scent of Mandarin	Metropolitan Filmexport (France)	
2015	Un plus une	Metropolitan Filmexport (France)	
2016	Criminal	Lionsgate Films (United States); Metropolitan Filmexport (France)	France only; Uncredited in the US
2016	Fanny's Journey	Metropolitan Filmexport (France)	
2016	Mechanic: Resurrection	Lionsgate Films (United States); Metropolitan Filmexport (France)	France only; Uncredited in the US
2016	Resident Evil: The Final Chapter	Constantin Film (Germany); Sony Pictures Releasing (United Kingdom, United States, Canada and Australia); Metropolitan Filmexport (France)	
2017	Loue-moi!	Metropolitan Filmexport (France)	
2017	The Hitman's Bodyguard	Lionsgate Films (United States); Metropolitan Filmexport (France)	France only; Uncredited in the US
2017	Papillon	Bleecker Street (United States); Blitz (Serbia & Montenegro); Metropolitan Filmexport (France)	France only; Uncredited in the US
2017	Everyone's Life	Metropolitan Filmexport (France)	
2018	Love Addict	Metropolitan Filmexport (France)	
2018	Belleville Cop	Metropolitan Filmexport (France)	
2018	Hunter Killer	Lionsgate Films (United States); Metropolitan Filmexport (France)	France only; Uncredited in the US
2018	La voix humaine	Metropolitan Filmexport (France)	
2019	Hellboy	Lionsgate Films (United States); Metropolitan Filmexport (France)	France only; Uncredited in the US
2019	The Best Years of a Life	Metropolitan Filmexport (France)	
2019	Andy	Metropolitan Filmexport (France)	
2019	Lucky Day	Metropolitan Filmexport (France); Elevation Pictures (Canada); Lionsgate Films (United States)	
2019	Rambo: Last Blood	Lionsgate Films (United States); Metropolitan Filmexport (France)	France only; Uncredited in the US
2019	Sisters in Arms	Metropolitan Filmexport (France)	
2019	The Outpost	Screen Media (United States); Metropolitan Filmexport (France)	France only; Uncredited in the US
2021	Hitman's Wife's Bodyguard	Lionsgate Films (United States); Metropolitan Filmexport (France)	France only; Uncredited in the US
2021	Till Death	Screen Media (United States); Metropolitan Filmexport (France)	France only; Uncredited in the US
2021	Jolt	Amazon Studios (United States)	Uncredited; under Victor Hadida
2021	Resident Evil: Welcome to Raccoon City	Sony Pictures Releasing (United States and United Kingdom); Constantin Film (Germany); Metropolitan Filmexport (France)	
2022	Crimes of the Future	Sphere Films (Canada); Metropolitan Filmexport (France); Vertigo Films (United Kingdom); Argonauts Distribution (Greece)	France only; Uncredited in the US, UK, Canada and Greece
2022	La Traversée	Metropolitan Filmexport (France)	
2022	Marlowe	Metropolitan Filmexport (France); Open Road Films (United States)	
2023	The Offering	Decal (United States); Metropolitan Filmexport (France)	France only; Uncredited in the US
2023	In the Land of Saints and Sinners	Netflix (United Kingdom and Ireland); Samuel Goldwyn Films (United States); Metropolitan Filmexport (France)	France only; Uncredited in the US, UK and Ireland
2023	Expend4bles	Lionsgate Films (United States); Metropolitan Filmexport (France)	France only; Uncredited in the US
2023	The Piper	Samuel Goldwyn Films (United States)	Uncredited; under Victor Hadida
2023	Flo	Metropolitan Filmexport (France)	
2023	The Bricklayer	Vertical (United States); Metropolitan Filmexport (France)	France only; Uncredited in the US
2024	Race for Glory: Audi vs. Lancia	Metropolitan Filmexport (France); 01 Distribution (Italy); Signature Entertainment (United Kingdom)	
2024	Wanted Man	Quiver Distribution (United States)	Uncredited; under Victor Hadida
2024	Kali	Amazon Prime Video & Metropolitan Filmexport (France)	
2024	Hellboy: The Crooked Man	Ketchup Entertainment (United States)	Uncredited; under Victor Hadida
2024	The Crow	Lionsgate Films (United States); Entertainment Film Distributors (United Kingdom); Metropolitan Filmexport (France)	
2024	Subservience	XYZ Films (United States)	Uncredited; under Victor Hadida
2024	Dirty Angels	Lionsgate Films (United States)	Uncredited; under Victor Hadida
2025	The Ice Tower	Metropolitan Filmexport (France)	
2025	Guns Up	Vertical (United States)	Uncredited; under Victor Hadida
2025	Red Sonja	Samuel Goldwyn Films (United States)	Uncredited; under Victor Hadida
2026	Return to Silent Hill	Metropolitan Filmexport (France); Cineverse (United States)	
2026	Shelter	Black Bear Pictures (United States)	Uncredited; under Victor Hadida
2026	Resident Evil	Sony Pictures Releasing (United States); Constantin Film (Germany); Metropolitan Filmexport (France)	

=== Upcoming ===
Year	Film	Distributor	Notes
2027	John Rambo	Lionsgate Films (United States)	France only; Uncredited in the US
TBA	Fleur	Metropolitan Filmexport (France)	
TBA	Trompe-La-Mort	Metropolitan Filmexport (France)	
TBA	House of Night	Highland Film Group (United States)	
TBA	Untitled Fatal Frame/Project Zero film	TBA	
