= Un plus une =

2015 film

- Film poster
- Directed by: Claude Lelouch
- Written by: Claude Lelouch; Valérie Perrin
- Produced by: Marc Dujardin; Samuel Hadida; Victor Hadida; Claude Lelouch; Jean-Paul de Vidas
- Starring: Jean Dujardin; Elsa Zylberstein; Christopher Lambert; Alice Pol
- Cinematography: Robert Alazraki
- Edited by: Stéphane Mazalaigue
- Music by: Francis Lai
- Production companies: Les Films 13; Davis Films; JD Prod; France 2 Cinéma
- Distributed by: Metropolitan Filmexport
- Release dates: 29 August 2015 (Angoulême); 9 December 2015 (France)
- Running time: 113 minutes
- Country: France
- Language: French
- Box office: $7.7 million

Un plus une ("One plus one", with the 'one's being grammatically masculine and feminine respectively) is a 2015 French romantic comedy film directed by Claude Lelouch and starring Jean Dujardin, Elsa Zylberstein, Christopher Lambert, and Alice Pol. It was shown in the Special Presentations section of the 2015 Toronto International Film Festival.

Through a range of settings, such as a striking sequence filmed at the banks of the Ganges, the leads convey their characters’ friendship and romantic attraction.

== Plot ==
A getaway car with two robbers knocks a woman off her bicycle. One robber forces the other out of the car so he can go back and help. He takes her to hospital and is arrested. This incident inspires Indian director Rahul Abhi (Rahul Vohra) to make a film (which he calls Juliette and Romeo, insisting the female comes first) starring the man and woman as themselves. He hires Antoine Abeilard (Jean Dujardin), a famed film composer, to travel to India to score the film.

Immediately upon landing Antoine is proposed to over the phone by his pianist girlfriend (Alice Pol) but does not respond. The French ambassador to India, Samuel (Christophe Lambert), hosts a dinner for Antoine. Samuel becomes jealous when his New Age obsessed much younger wife Anna Hamon (Elsa Zylberstein) pays a lot of attention to Antoine and she flees to Antoine after her husband yells at her. The pair become friends and she talks a lot about spiriturality including the miraculous events surrounding Amma, the "hugging saint", despite describing Antoine as a pragmatist who is not open to the supernatural. Her emotional interest compels Antoine to follow her on a “fertility pilgrimage”. She and Samuel, a man she seems to admire without passion, have been trying to conceive a child. Anna is hopeful that participating in a ritual Hindu gathering will help her conceive. Antoine follows Anna to find a cure for his troubling headaches though he is equally drawn to Anna's company.

The pair travels to the holy city of Varanasi where they interact with various local people including sadhus. As they travel south to Amritapuri, to receive an embrace from Amma, Antoine says she has been sending her signals of a sexual nature, especially bathing in the Ganges in a blouse that became transparent, but she insists that was a spiritual cleansing only and the pair agree they are just friends. Other conversations include flashback stories of meeting their current partners (Antoine met Alice when she was playing piano on the street. Anna met Samuel as he was leaving the embassy when she was distraught after having her passport stolen; he pretended to be the ambassador's chauffeur and Anna says she fell in love with him as the chauffeur before he revealed he was the ambassador; we also see a contemporary event where Alice has arrived in India and Samuel, again pretending to be the chauffeur, picks her up at the airport). Antoine and Anna are both embraced by Amma.

Following this they are shown having sex in their hotel room. Alice arrives at Antoine's hotel with a loaded revolver and sees them having sex and shoots at them. The scene cuts to Anna waking revealing that was a dream. Their conversation over breakfast reveals that they did have sex, with Antoine apologising and saying he did poorly, but Anna saying he did 'hit the right buttons'.

Samuel calls Anna. He is upset that Anna did not answer her phone the previous night, asks if Antoine is around and has had his headaches removed, and is surprised to hear that Anna will fly back given her fear of flying. He lies saying that the piano playing in the background is the tuner when in fact it is Alice who has spent the night with Samuel. When the call ends, Anna says she will tell Samuel because he will forgive her if she is upfront. Then Alice calls and Antoine says his headaches are better and that he doesn't want to stay at the embassy any longer.

The four meet at the airport and the ambassador says that being unable to reach Anna on her phone, or on the hotel phone, he was worried and called Alice early in the morning, and, being so upset, he kissed her and they embraced for a long time (implying they had sex), saying it was proper for them to tell their respective partners and implying he knows Antoine and Anna have been unfaithful. Without any prevarication, Antoine immediately asks if Alice forgives him and she says no. He leaves without Alice accompanying him. Anna apologises to Samuel but he also says he does not forgive her. Anna leaves, implying their relationship is over. Alice then asks why Samuel lied (since they had done nothing sexual). He says they could have and should have had sex. Alice leaves saying she is going to see Amma and she does.

About four or five years later, Antoine arrives in France. At the airport he hears a woman shouting after her child also called Antoine and sees that the woman is Anna. He learns that the boy is his four-year-old son. They part after just a few moments. Their cars end up driving next to each other for a few seconds and the boy makes shooting gestures which Antoine imitates. Anna goes to her parents' long boat (passing signage advertising Alice as a soloist pianist) and Antoine's father stops their car at the same place. Antoine exits the car but does nothing. While Antoine has lunch with his father Anna watches Juliette and Romeo (describing it as a love story, a story about people who love each other but fight) for the first time and then Antoine boards Anna's parents' home. Little Antoine goes to investigate the noise, says it is the man from the airport, and Anna smiles broadly as she goes up the stairs to greet Antoine. The scene cuts to Anna and Antoine being hugged by Amma at the same time.

In a post credits scene, Anna and Antoine are seen dancing together in India dressed in Indian style as bride and groom.

== Cast ==
- Jean Dujardin as Antoine Abeilard
- Elsa Zylberstein as Anna Hamon
- Christopher Lambert as Samuel Hamon
- Alice Pol as Alice Hanel
- Rahul Vohra as Rahul Abhi
- Shriya Pilgaonkar as Ayanna
- Abhishek Krishnan as Sanjay
- Venantino Venantini as Henri
- Hélène Medigue as Anna's friend
- Philippe Azoulay as a reporter
- Priyanshu Chatterjee as himself
- Mata Amritanandamayi (Amma) as herself
- Kalki Koechlin as herself

== Production ==
Principal photography began on 6 January 2015 and took place over a period of six weeks in India, in Mumbai, Varanasi, and New Delhi. Some parts were filmed in Amritapuri in Kerala at the ashram of Mata Amritanandamayi.

== Accolades ==
Award / Film Festival	Category	Recipients and nominees	Result
Lumière Awards	Best Actress	Elsa Zylberstein	Nominated
