= Silent Hill (film) =

2006 film by Christophe Gans

- American theatrical release poster
- Directed by: Christophe Gans
- Written by: Roger Avary
- Based on: Silent Hill by Konami
- Produced by: Samuel Hadida; Don Carmody
- Starring: Radha Mitchell; Sean Bean; Laurie Holden; Deborah Kara Unger; Kim Coates; Tanya Allen; Alice Krige; Jodelle Ferland
- Cinematography: Dan Laustsen
- Edited by: Sébastien Prangère
- Music by: Jeff Danna; Akira Yamaoka
- Production companies: TriStar Pictures; Silent Hill DCP Inc.; Davis Films; Konami
- Distributed by: Alliance Atlantis (Canada); Metropolitan Filmexport (France); Sony Pictures Releasing (United States)
- Release dates: April 21, 2006 (Canada); April 26, 2006 (France)
- Running time: 126 minutes
- Countries: France; Canada
- Language: English
- Budget: $50 million
- Box office: $100.6 million

Silent Hill is a 2006 supernatural psychological horror film based on the video game series published by Konami. Directed by Christophe Gans and written by Roger Avary, it is the first installment in the Silent Hill film series. The film stars Radha Mitchell, Sean Bean, Laurie Holden, Deborah Kara Unger, Kim Coates, Tanya Allen, Alice Krige and Jodelle Ferland. Its plot follows a mother who, after her daughter mentions the eponymous town while sleepwalking and goes missing upon entering it, uncovers dark secrets within and survives dangerous forces while searching for her.

After attempting to gain the film rights to Silent Hill for five years, Gans sent a video interview to Konami explaining his plans for adapting it and how important the games were to him. Konami awarded him the film rights as a result, and he and Avary began working on the script in 2004. Avary used Centralia, Pennsylvania as inspiration for the town. Principal photography began in April 2005 and lasted three months with an estimated $50 million budget, and was shot on sound stages and on location in Ontario, Canada. Most of the monsters encountered were played by professional dancers, while a minority were created with CGI.

Silent Hill was released theatrically in Canada on April 21, 2006, by Alliance Atlantis and in France on April 26 by Metropolitan Filmexport, grossing $100.6 million worldwide. The film received generally negative reviews from critics upon release, although retrospective reviews have been more favorable and it has garnered a cult following. A sequel, titled Silent Hill: Revelation, was released in October 2012, while a third film, Return to Silent Hill, was released in January 2026, with Gans returning as writer-director.

== Plot ==
Rose Da Silva and her husband Christopher are disturbed by their adopted daughter Sharon's constant sleepwalking and nightmares about Silent Hill, a town in West Virginia that was abandoned in the 1970s due to a massive coal seam fire. Desperate for a solution, Rose takes Sharon on a trip to Silent Hill to find answers. Her erratic behavior concerns police officer Cybil Bennett when they encounter her at a gas station en route. As they enter Silent Hill, a girl steps out into the road, causing Rose to crash and black out. She awakens in the fog-shrouded dimension of Silent Hill and realizes that Sharon is missing.

Searching the town for Sharon, Rose pursues the girl she encountered prior to the crash, who resembles Sharon. At various points, the town suddenly transitions into a nightmarish world inhabited by inhuman monsters, including the fearsome Red Pyramid. Cybil encounters and tries to arrest Rose, but while attempting to bring her to the local station, they realize they are trapped, all roads out of town ending in a mysterious cliff. Rose encounters many other inhuman creatures and learns of Alessa Gillespie, a young girl burned as a witch by the Brethren, the town's fanatical Manichean cult. Her mother Dahlia wanders the streets as an outcast, guilt-ridden over her negligence that led to Alessa's suffering. In the real world, Christopher searches the abandoned town with policeman Thomas Gucci, but they find nothing: the town appears to them simply as a dilapidated, abandoned place devoid of fog or creatures. Gucci later reveals he lived in Silent Hill and saved Alessa from the fire. He encourages Christopher to end his futile search.

The cult symbol that appears several times in the film

In the Silent Hill dimension, Rose encounters the girl again, revealed to be an aspect of Alessa. When the town transitions into the dark dimension, Rose, Cybil, and Anna, a Brethren member, flee to an old church, but the Red Pyramid catches and skins Anna alive. Brethren members lead Rose and Cybil to a hospital, claiming the demon that has taken Sharon is in the basement. Upon noticing an image of Sharon in Rose's locket, Christabella, the high priestess of the Brethren, identifies Sharon as a likeness of Alessa. She decries the two women as witches and orders her Brethren to stop them. Cybil holds them off while Rose descends into the basement, but is quickly subdued and captured.

Rose explores the basement but is barricaded by a group of disfigured nurses. She sneaks past them and enters Alessa's room. In a flashback, it is revealed that Alessa was stigmatized by the townspeople for being born out of wedlock. Christabella convinced Dahlia to "purify" Alessa after Alessa was raped by the school janitor. Christabella immolated Alessa during a ritual in 1974, but Dahlia alerted Gucci. The pair arrived too late, and the ritual went awry, igniting the coal seam fire. Hospitalized and in excruciating pain, Alessa's rage split her soul apart, one half manifesting as the dark entity responsible for the shifting dimensions of Silent Hill. Her remaining innocence manifested as Sharon, who was taken to the real world to be adopted. Desperate to find Sharon, Rose allows Dark Alessa's spirit into her body, granting it access to the church. Sharon, despite being protected by Dahlia, is captured by the Brethren.

In the church, Christabella burns Cybil as a witch and plans to do the same to Sharon. Rose confronts Christabella, denouncing her as a murderer before Christabella stabs Rose in the heart. Alessa emerges from the blood flowing from the wound as a disfigured being, bound to a hospital bed, and tears Christabella and her followers (excluding Dahlia) apart with razor wire. Rose rescues Sharon, and Sharon and Alessa/Dark Alessa reunite into one body. Rose and Alessa leave the town and return home. Upon arriving, they discover they are still in the foggy dimension, separated from reality. Meanwhile, Christopher awakens alone in the real world and discovers that the front door has mysteriously opened.

== Cast ==
- Radha Mitchell as Rose Da Silva, the desperate mother who seeks a cure for her daughter Sharon's nightmarish sleepwalking by taking her to the ghost town of Silent Hill
- Sean Bean as Christopher Da Silva, the father of Sharon and husband of Rose who opposes his wife's decision to find answers in Silent Hill
- Laurie Holden as Cybil Bennett, a motorcycle police officer from the fictional city of Brahams who becomes suspicious of Rose and follows her into Silent Hill
- Deborah Kara Unger as Dahlia Gillespie, the mother of Alessa who walks the foggy dimension of Silent Hill as penance after giving her daughter up for sacrifice. She is a much more sympathetic character in the film, compared to her game counterpart.
- Kim Coates as Officer Thomas Gucci, a kind-hearted police officer who once served with the Silent Hill force before transferring when the town was abandoned. He is jaded and hardened by his experiences.
- Tanya Allen as Anna, the youngest Brethren member who was born in the foggy dimension of Silent Hill, and has no knowledge of the outside world.
- Alice Krige as Christabella, the fanatical, sadistic and delusional high priestess of the Brethren, who burn those deemed as "witches" to prevent the Apocalypse and maintain a sinless existence. Though her character doesn't exist in the games, her motive and backstory was instead taken from the game version of Dahlia.
- Jodelle Ferland as:
  - Sharon Da Silva, the adopted daughter of Rose and Christopher, and manifestation of Alessa's innocence.
  - Alessa Gillespie, a powerful psychic born out of wedlock, who is persecuted and eventually immolated by the Brethren.
    - Ferland also portrays Dark Alessa, the manifestation of Alessa's rage born out of her suffering.
    - Lorry Ayers portrays the adult Alessa Gillespie, who was kept alive for 30 years in the basement of a hospital and eventually returns as a scarred woman to exact her revenge upon the Brethren.
- Eve Crawford as Sister Margaret, the headmistress of the orphanage from which Sharon was adopted.
- Nicky Guadagni as Eleanor, Anna's mother.
- Chris Britton as Adam, a Brethren member.
- Roberto Campanella as Red Pyramid, a tall humanoid monster wearing a pyramid-shaped helmet wielding a large great knife.
  - Campanella also portrayed Colin, the school janitor who raped Alessa, and the monster version of Colin after being punished by Alessa. Additionally, Campanella was the movement coordinator for the other creatures that were used in the film.
- Emily Lineham as Lisa Garland (credited as "Red Nurse"), a nurse who was horribly scarred by Alessa for peeking into her burn tent, and who eventually becomes one of the Dark Nurses Rose encounters in the hospital.

== Production ==
=== Development ===
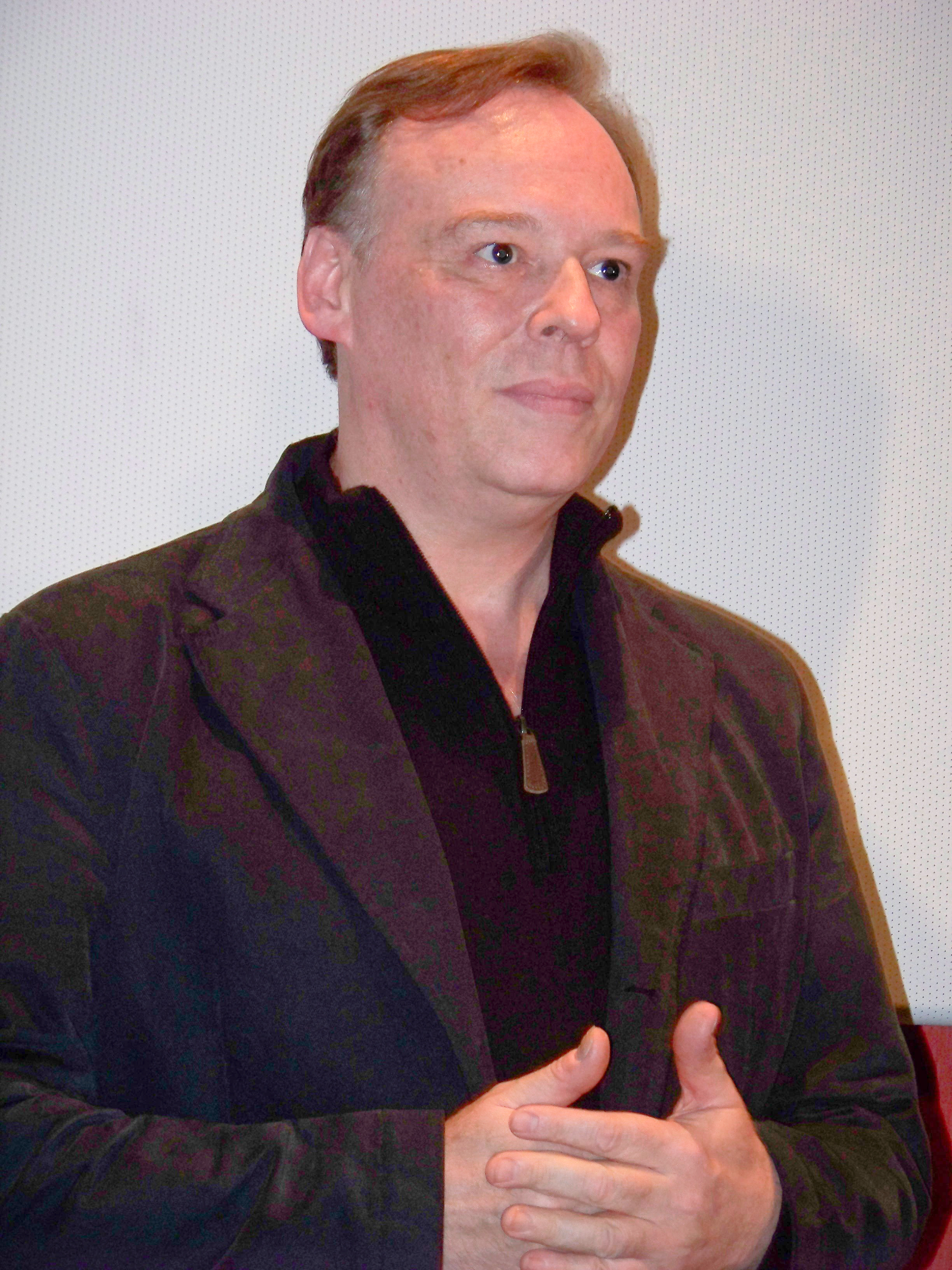
Christophe Gans (pictured here in 2010) claimed that he had created a new type of horror film.

The idea of the film adaptation of Silent Hill (1999) was voiced by director Christophe Gans for the first time to producer Samuel Hadida during the filming of the film Brotherhood of the Wolf (2001). Hadida, knowing the game's rich visual aesthetics, believed that eerie storytelling matched Gans' encyclopedic knowledge of cinematography. Gans became acquainted with the video game series approximately six years before the release of his film, and initially wanted to adapt the second game (2001) since it was the most "emotional" of all four and the most beloved by fans. He compared it to the myth of Orpheus, who descended into the underworld after Eurydice. However, he said that Silent Hill 2 was not the "real Silent Hill": there was no mythology, and the city only played the role of a backdrop for the unfolding story. As a result, he realized that it was impossible to film an adaptation of the second game without saying a word about the origin of the city.

According to Gans, the first game captivated him with its extraordinary plot: it was so "completely unique" and "absolutely frightening" that it was worthy to become the basis for a real film. Many of his entourage were surprised at the opinion that a banal video game can scare someone. To this, the director replied that Silent Hill was one of the scariest experiences he ever had. He called it "an experiment with a unique and independent world, which is both beautiful and terrible at the same time". Even before the release of Silent Hill 2, Gans sent "a ton of letters" to copyright holders, but received no response. He presented his vision of the film and how important the games are to him in a 37-minute video with Japanese subtitles, which was shown at a meeting of the Konami board of directors. Representatives of the company realized that Gans was the only one among the major studios fighting for the right to film adaptation who understood the essence of the game, (Note: Gans said that Miramax, Paramount, Sam Raimi, and Tom Cruise's company were also pursuing the film rights.) and the director received the filming rights after two months, which he sought for a total of five years. The publishers insisted that the project retain the original plot and setting.

Gans had not previously directed any game adaptations, and stated that the process is completely unlike anything else. According to him, in projects of this type, the most important challenge is to bring the background story in the game to the foreground. Hadida said that "Silent Hill is something outside of cinema." He believed that the game was so popular because everyone felt something unique when playing it, and the film only enhances that feeling. The creators have also said that the film is a tribute to the horror genre. Gans considered his film to be halfway between science fiction, Clive Barker's books, and hardcore horror.

=== Writing ===
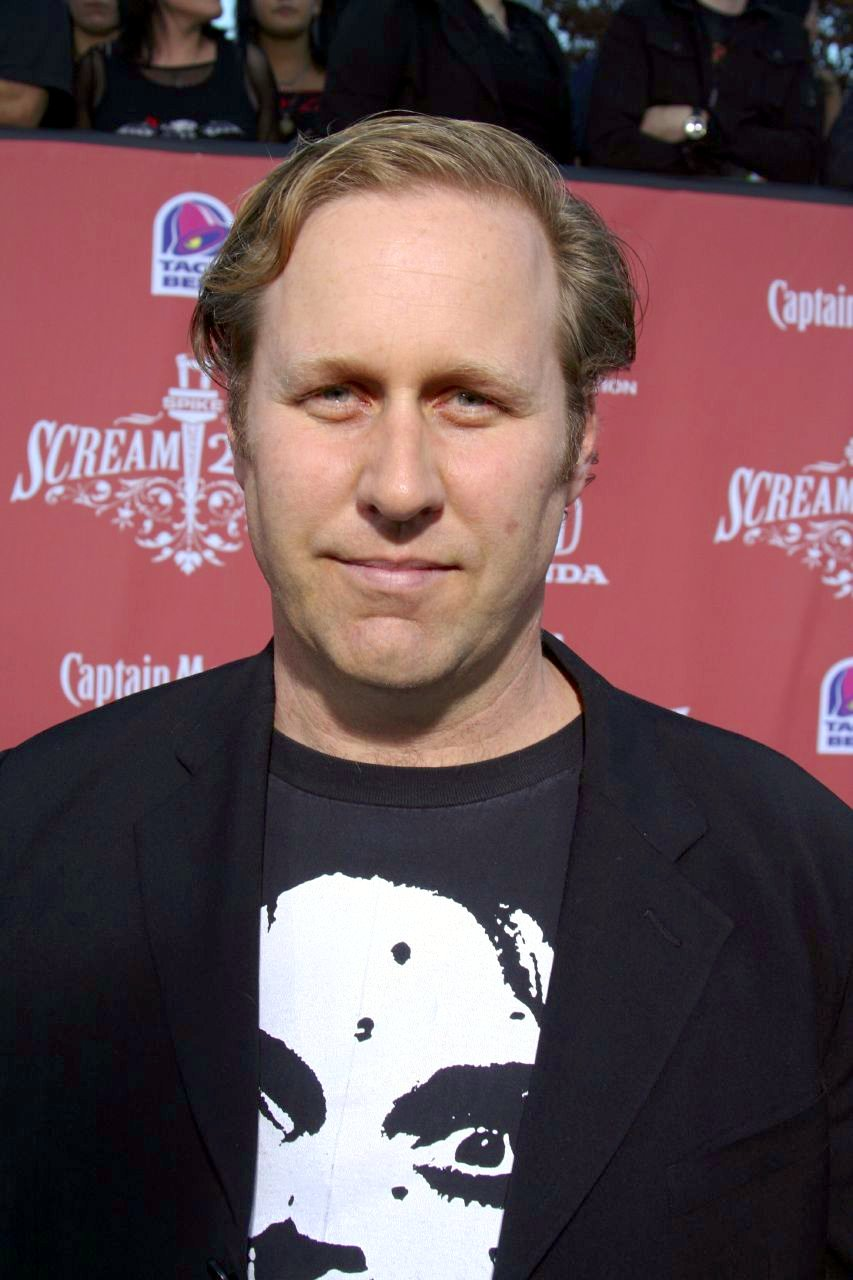
Roger Avary wrote the script word by word while playing the game.

When the decision was made to adapt Silent Hill, Gans and Hadida phoned screenwriter Roger Avary. They outlined their plans and offered to write a script. "It's not so easy", Avary said, "when you're going to film something, especially a game, you need to be ready to take everything apart, and then put it together in a new way. The only thing that remains of the original material is the main idea, the concept, which all your actions are subordinated to." It was decided to combine in-game monsters with creatures invented by the film crew. Gans tried to stick as close to the original source as possible, while Avary saw it as his main task to convey the spirit of the game; he kept some storylines, and tried to combine the rest of the elements into new compositions. Thus, the director was more faithful to the creator's intention, and the screenwriter preferred to interpret the original material broadly.

Since Gans had already formed the concept of the future plot of the film, he sent the screenwriter several discs with "atmospheric" videos (Note: Among others, The City of the Dead was recorded on these discs.) to point Avary's work in the right direction, as well as the developments compiled by himself and Nicolas Boukhrief. They were written in French, but the scriptwriter was required to translate them into English, write dialogues and change a few conceptual factors. Avary did not limit himself to acquaintance with the presented film library and personally went through all entries of the game series. All changes made by Avary were translated into Christophe's native language. A rough draft of the work was ready by October 2004. Nevertheless, due to the complete absence of male characters, the script was rejected by the producers; only after the script was modified to include Sean Bean's character and subplot was it approved. Avary recalled that as soon as they received the "stupid note from the studio", Gans got angry. Yet, later they realized that this storyline can be made interesting and emphasize the peculiarities of the perception of reality. As a result, the plot became a combination of the first game with separate elements of the second and third. Gans elaborated: "We weren't trying to put all three games into a two-hour production, this is an adaptation of the first Silent Hill. However, there are so many interesting details [in the following installments] that it was impossible to resist."

Roger Avary regularly received letters from fans, whom he called "crazy". He saved some messages, the senders of which claimed that only they can write the script, and if Roger does not cope with his task, then he will be found and killed. Avary believed these threats were very real. Fans sent him their own versions of scripts to his mailbox, but Avary, saying that "it all smacks of delirium", deleted them without reading.

Avary used the town of Centralia, Pennsylvania as a prototype for the town of Silent Hill; he commented that as a child, his father, who was a mining engineer, used to tell him stories about Centralia, where coal deposits from the local mine caught fire and released toxic gases into the town, as well as creating sinkholes when the abandoned mineshafts and coal seams began to collapse. This forced the town to evacuate forever. Avary was fascinated since childhood by the idea that fires underneath the town would be burning for such a long time. The film acquired its working title in honor of the city — Centralia.

Samuel Hadida tried to approach the writing of the script with the same feelings that arose during the gameplay of Silent Hill. The script also required the creation of a logical splicing between the various levels so that a person not familiar with the game could easily understand what was happening on the screen. The creators were guided by the impressions of the fans, who suggested what impressed them more, what kept them in suspense, which characters seemed the most effective. At the heart of the plot, there is the search for a daughter, which leads the main character. Roger liked long dialogues, while Christophe preferred to shorten them as much as possible. In the end, they managed to achieve balance. Actions accounted for 30 pages, in which Rose explores the world of Silent Hill. There were long debates over the ending. For the ending, Avary wanted to use the theme of forgiveness, while Gans wanted to see a darker ending, the key message of which would be revenge. As a result, Avary gave up as he was convinced by the director's logical arguments.

After taking the script, Radha Mitchell read only 10 pages of text. She was alone in her apartment and, by her own admission, she felt uncomfortable with fear. She finished reading it only a week later in the light of the sun, and said: "That's what attracted me to the piece as well because it was definitely a page-turner and it freaked me out". Sean Bean also found the plot scary. In contrast to these impressions, Laurie Holden liked the script – she deemed it spectacular, complex, multi-level with wonderful themes and therefore interesting to work with. Deborah Kara Unger called it "Alice in Wonderland meets Dante's Inferno".

=== Concept ===
The heroines of the film are Rose Da Silva (left) and Cybil Bennett (right).

An integral part of the Silent Hill universe is the reality and unreality of the city. Silent Hill exists simultaneously in four different variations: the city of the 1970s, Silent Hill in the present, Silent Hill in the fog, and Silent Hill in the darkness. Two of the above measurements are based on temporal changes – one represents the city of thirty years ago and is used only in flashbacks, the other displays the current state of the city to which Christopher goes in search of his wife and daughter. The two remaining dimensions include a foggy day in which Rose searches for her daughter, symbolizing purgatory, and a gloomy day, consisting of enveloping darkness, which is the embodiment of Hell. Gans reported that in his work he tried to discover new dimensions of space and time in metaphysical and mystical aspects. He stated, "We're not trying to explain everything, as I prefer people to find meaning in this story themselves. It is much more pleasant to enjoy the understatement. It's kind of a playful invitation to be smart".

According to executive producer Andrew Mason, Silent Hill is a story of what happens in the moments between death and fate. The film talks about people who deny their own fate and therefore fall into the trap of alternate dimensions. It "deals with the terror of loneliness, the fear of the dark, the fear of taking responsibility for your own evil side, and the fear of your own fate". The game created a sense of constant threat, while the film "seeks to reproduce that experience for a wider audience".

The film's leitmotif is motherhood, faith and persecution, presented at a symbolic level. Motherhood represents a form of the virgin birth. In addition to Rose, the key characters in the themes of the dramatic structure are the childless Cybil, Dahlia, and Christabella; the latter of whom lost her child, believing that abandoning motherhood is a blessing for society. Gans stated that motherhood in the film is about "Immaculate Conception — motherhood achieved in the noblest way." By the time Silent Hill comes to its denouement, which takes place in the sanctuary of the sect, the film turns into a cautionary tale warning against religious fanaticism. The director noted that monotheistic Abrahamic religions constantly attacked the idea of femininity, but the film, at the same time, is not moralizing.

Gans described the concept of the town's connection to the child Alessa and the cult: "It's a town of people trapped in dark dreams, and she inflicts onto the town what those people did to her body. That is, to me, the meaning of the darkness. The appearance of the town is corrupted in the way that her own flesh was wounded." "It's interesting because the town itself mirrors this fractured psychology—different dimensions, different doubles of the same person." In speaking about the creatures in Silent Hill, Gans said that "these monsters are [damned], with the poetic direction of the term: they are a little like the Japanese phantoms, i.e. residues of forgotten feelings as strong as hatred or [guilt]." "The monsters in the game are not really monsters, but rather a mockery of human beings. The real monsters are the people, the cultists who tortured Alessa. When I approached the film, I knew that it was impossible to represent the monsters as simply beasts that jump on you."

=== Influences ===
The appearance of the games in the series was largely influenced by Adrian Lyne's film Jacob's Ladder (1990), especially the subway and hospital scenes. Gans believed that the film crew was able to create a unique piece that did not rely on the style of Lyne's film. Gans' film adaptation is not an imitation of Lyne's film, as Silent Hill has long evolved into a completely separate phenomenon that exists on its own. The film was influenced by the work of Sergio Leone and David Lean: the city of the seventies was created under the inspiration of the films Lawrence of Arabia (1962) and The Good, the Bad and the Ugly (1966), and in general, it was filmed under the influence of various works ranging from a book of pictures about Chernobyl to The Matrix. In the film, Gans paid homage to the works of Salvador Dalí, Hans Bellmer, Francis Bacon, Jean Cocteau, Alberto Giacometti, Clive Barker, H. P. Lovecraft, David Cronenberg, and Michael Mann.

According to the director's initial idea, six Red Pyramids were to be present inside the church in the film's denouement, slaughtering the cult members with various weapons, which was supposed to be an allusion to the events of Dante's Inferno. When budgetary and time constraints prevented this ending from being filmed, Gans created the new ending in which Alessa kills cultists with barbed wire – this sequence was inspired by the anime Urotsukidōji. In one of the scenes, Rose tries to remember how to get to the hospital room, and, studying the map, says: "down, down, left, right, left, right". Valery Korneev considered this scene a reference to the Konami Code, describing it as a barely noticeable curtsey towards the adult gamer audience. The ringtone on Rose's phone matches that of Solid Snake every time he receives a coded message. The director drew parallels between Avary's script and episodes of The Twilight Zone (1959–1964). Based on the film, a literary adaptation of the same name was written in Japanese by Paula Edgewood and Osamu Makino.

=== Characters and casting ===
The director noted that in the game, each character is very emotional and vulnerable, but at the same time the characters were called flat and schematic. After they were put on paper, Gans realized that the result was a failure. The actors represented more expansive and complex personas, so many of the characters were revamped. The filmmakers wanted all the characters in the film to appear gray and murky, as if they were in different dimensions simultaneously. When selecting actors, Christophe paid attention to those people who worked in independent cinema, as they brought a "different quality".

The protagonist of the original video game is a man named Harry Mason. The director of the film made a significant departure from the original source and replaced the main character with a woman, Rose Da Silva. Cristophe and the writers suddenly realized that they were working "with a completely feminine world". Gans explained that if you look closely at the game and do not take into account the appearance, you can see that the characters behave more like women than like men. They are worried about the child, they are very sensitive and often cry – all this is stereotypical for mother characters. "The whole movie is about motherhood", the director said. He believed that in any sinister story there must be a "saving grace". This change, despite the fact that Gans himself is a fan of the media franchise, did not bother him in the least "because the game is a game, and the film is a film".

The creators spent a lot of time and effort to find an actress for the role of Rose, sophisticated and defenseless, who had the right amount of sensitivity in her character. They needed an actress with a vulnerable image, full of determination. The audience had to worry about Rose and at the same time admire her ability to get out of various difficult situations with honor. Milla Jovovich and Meg Ryan auditioned for the role, but in the end the choice fell on Australian Radha Mitchell, previously known for her roles in 2004 films such as Woody Allen's Melinda and Melinda, Tony Scott's Man on Fire, and Marc Forster's Finding Neverland. Mitchell herself became interested in the project mainly because of Gans' personality – she was deeply impressed by his previous film, Brotherhood of the Wolf. The executive producer of the film, Andrew Mason, noted that Mitchell had the freshness, energy and joy of life necessary for the main character, who will lead the audience through a terrible world. Gans characterized Mitchell as a sophisticated and elegant sixties-style actress, reminiscent of Grace Kelly and Mia Farrow. Radha said that during the filming, she had to run a lot around the set and shout "Sharon" in 50 different ways. Also during the filming process, her attitude towards the character changed. She stated that there is something feminist in the concept of the film, since all female characters are in some kind of fantasy world, while men are only in reality. For the main character, about a hundred costumes were created, each of which was slightly darker than the previous one. In the beginning, Rose is dressed in a very light dress, and in the end – in a blood red, which symbolizes her evolution.

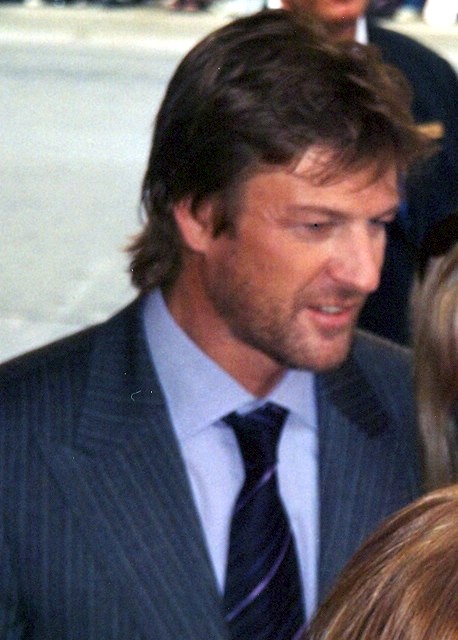
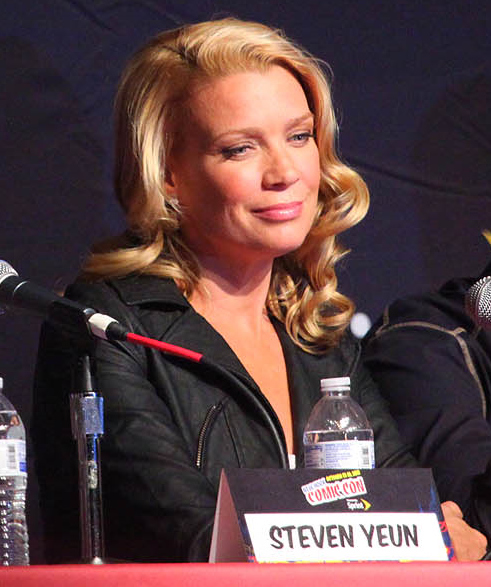
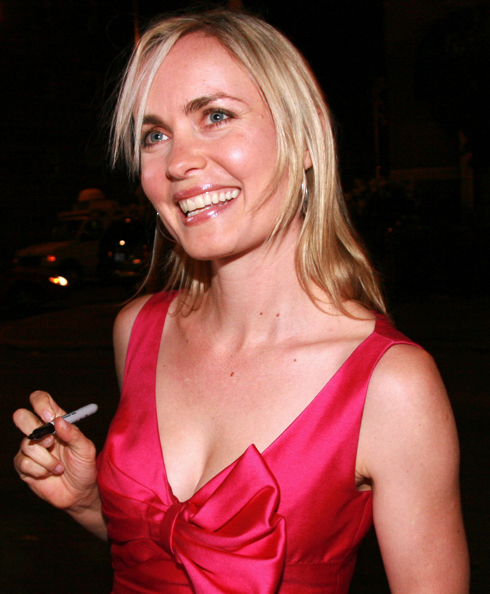
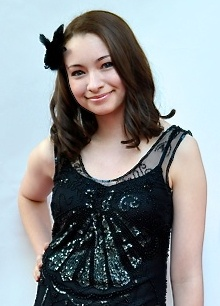
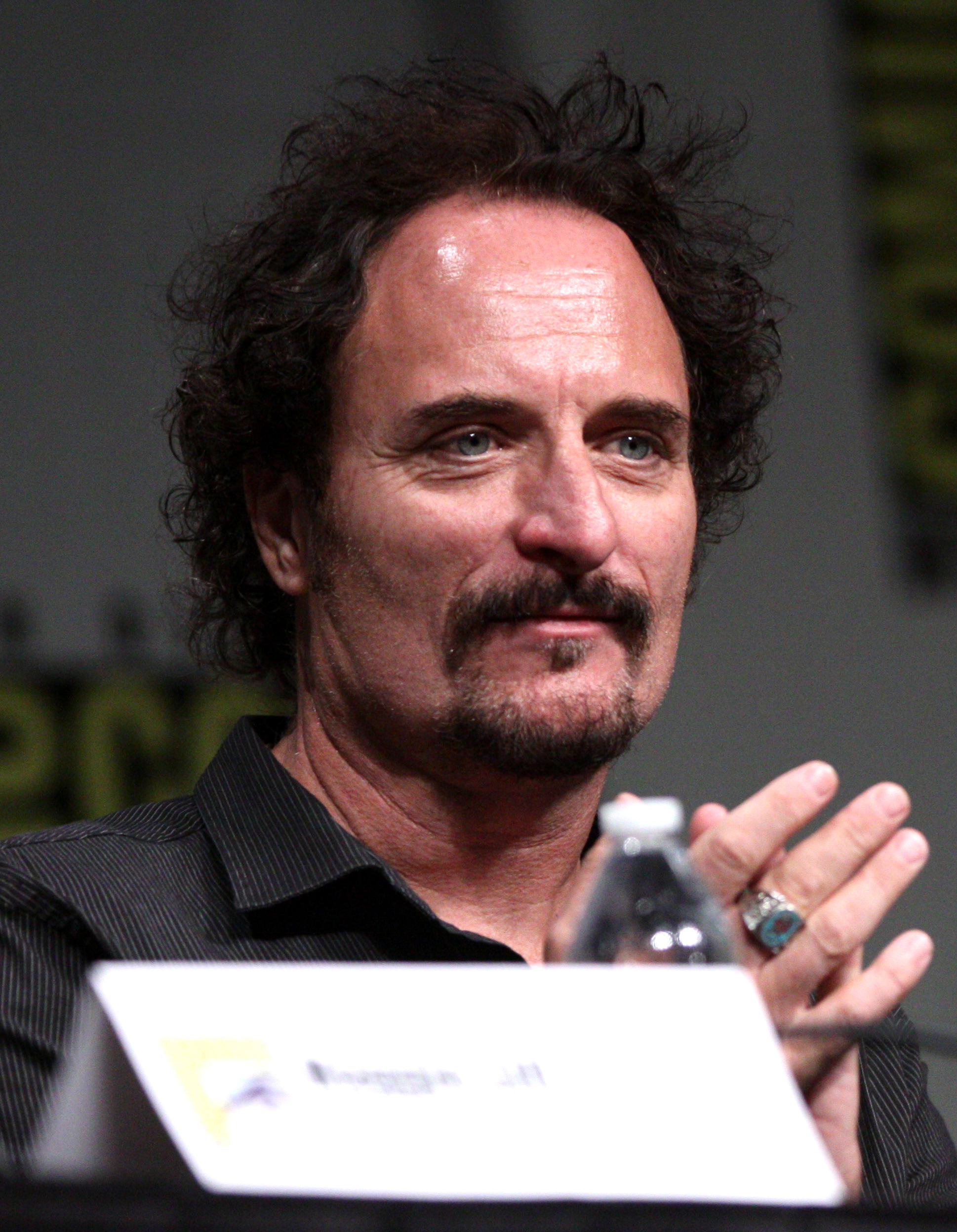
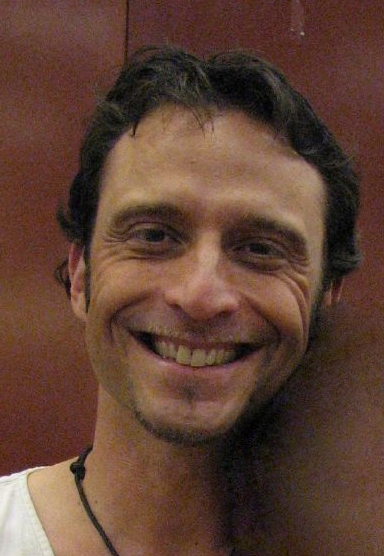
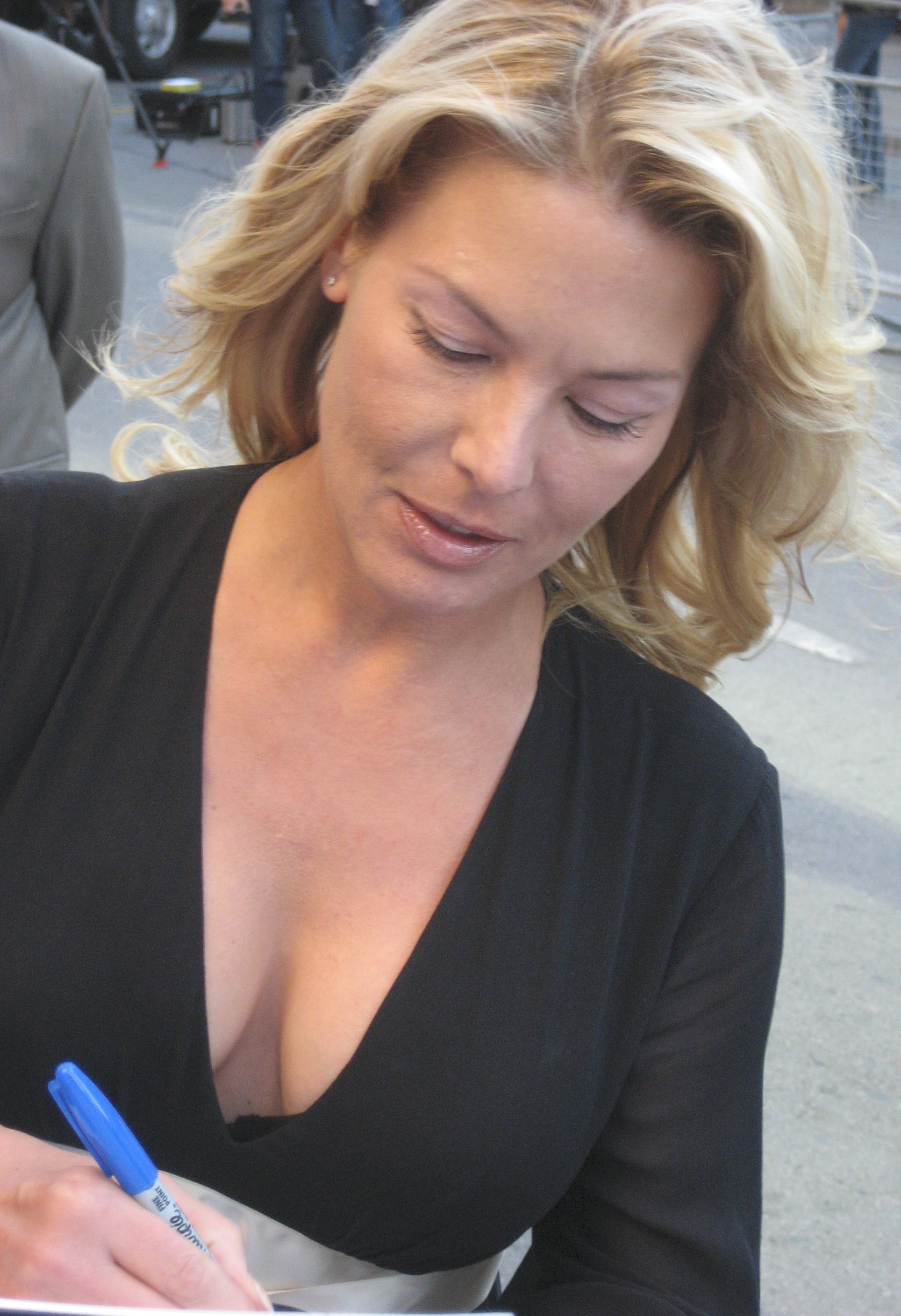
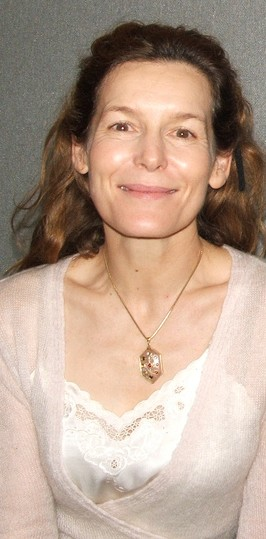
Silent Hill cast: Sean Bean, Laurie Holden, Radha Mitchell, Jodelle Ferland, Kim Coates, Roberto Campanella, Deborah Kara Unger, and Alice Krige

Ten-year-old Jodelle Ferland played three roles at once – her character exists in the Silent Hill universe in several incarnations: Sharon is the embodiment of "all the best" that was in the immolated Alessa, the suffering Alessa and the demonic Dark Alessa. The filmmakers intended to cast three different girls for these roles, but, nevertheless, a young actress was found capable of portraying these roles at the same time. Gans saw Ferland as "the ideal actress", drawing attention to her performance in the Kingdom Hospital miniseries and Terry Gilliam's Tideland. After Jodelle made her audition statement "I've always wanted to play the devil", and the director watched 15 hours of footage featuring the actress, she was approved for the role. Ferland, who had 26 acting credits at the time, reported that she has already played several girls similar to her character from the film: "I usually get creepy roles, like Dark Alessa". Gans supported Ferland's performances with "a combination of charm and gentle direction".

The role of Sean Bean, who plays Rose's husband, Kim Coates, who plays the police officer Gucci, and all the related storylines were missing from the initial script. They were introduced after the producers familiarized themselves with the initial version of the script and a note sent to the director about the need to introduce male characters into the film. (Note: According to another version, the role of Christopher was present in the original version of the script, appearing at the beginning and end of the film, therefore much less attention was paid to it than in the final version.) Sean Bean was the only one of all the actors in the lead roles who did not even try to play the game – he just saw the game packaging. He described his character as someone who is constantly between despair and determination to see the case through. Christopher tries to get to the bottom of it, no matter what it costs him. He is a successful businessman and a loving husband who senses the presence of evil. There is a certain nostalgia in his relationship with Rose. The actor for the role of Christopher was selected as the last one. The character was named after the director. The prototype of Christopher was the game's protagonist Harry Mason. Coates considered Silent Hill to be the strangest film he had ever starred in. His character officer Gucci's name is briefly mentioned in one of the notes found in the game – in it, he is described as a narcotics officer who suddenly dies of a heart attack.

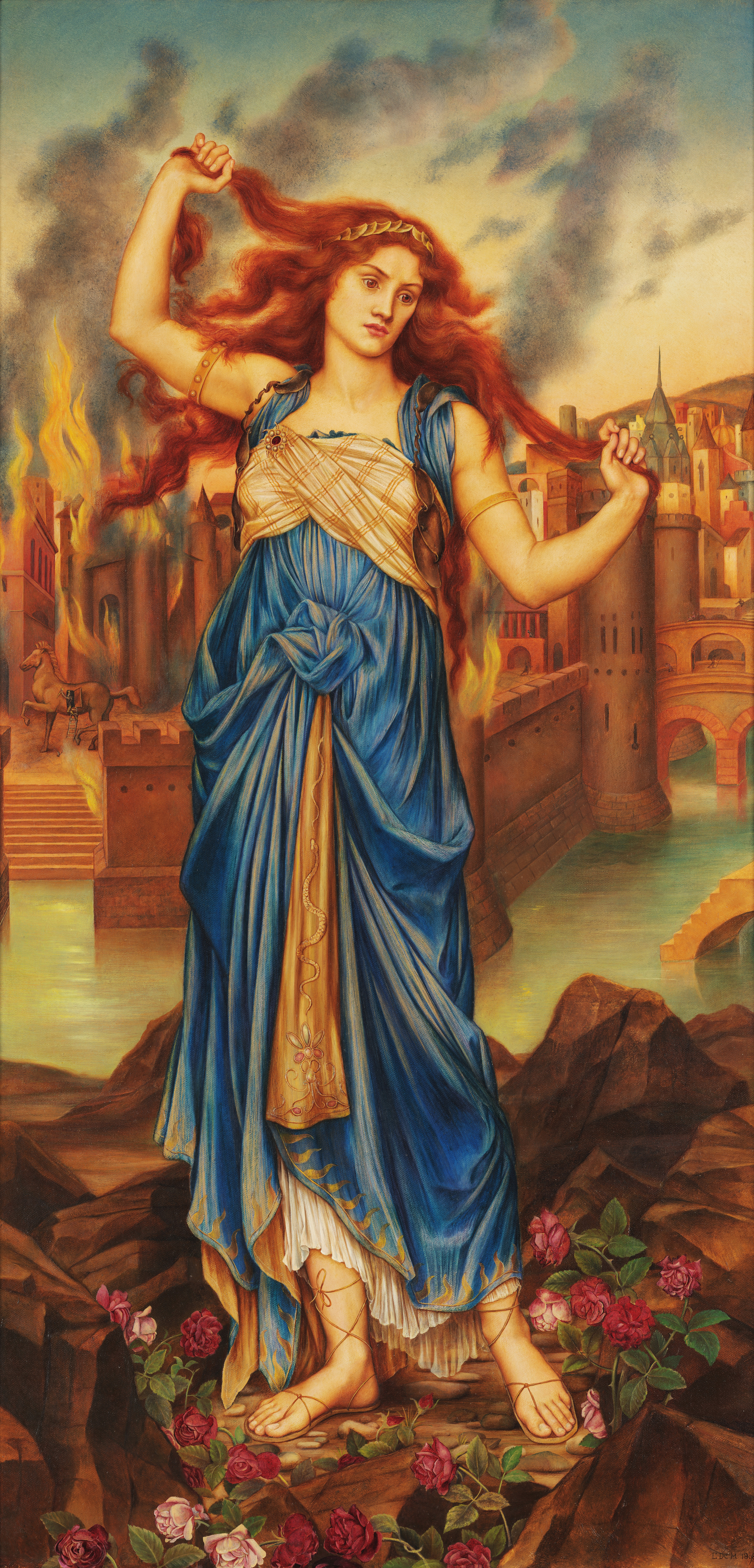
Deborah Kara Unger compared her character to Cassandra.

The character of Cybil Bennett, a brave, bold, and fearless police officer, is portrayed by Laurie Holden. The team behind the film were looking for an actress who would evoke sympathy from the audience when she sacrifices her own life to save Rose and Sharon. In the game, Cybil can also die a violent death – the parasite-infected police officer is killed by Harry Mason. (Note: There is an option to save Cybil, but the main storyline of Silent Hill and Silent Hill 3 involves her death.) Holden tried to play Silent Hill at the request of the director, but did not progress beyond the main character's first encounter with Cybil at the café. (Note: Practically the beginning of the game) According to Holden, there is something of a lone wolf in Cybil. The character bears a scar in her soul from her devoutly religious mother who died when Cybil was 13 years old, which is why she rejects religion and remains lonely. Afterward, Bennett finds her calling: to serve and protect. She wants to be like a mother to the children she saves. Holden stated that at that time, it was the "coolest" action role she had ever played. She noted that the character has a kind heart: "She is very strong but is very misunderstood." In order to resemble the character more, Holden's long hair was cut. Gans cast Holden after seeing her in The Majestic, stating, "in The Majestic, she was beautifully feminine and I cast her so I could show her other side, make her strong and sleek."

Dahlia Gillespie, played by Deborah Kara Unger, was taken from the original game but underwent significant reworking. In the game, Dahlia is portrayed as a mysterious occult fanatic who attempts to summon God by burning her own daughter, while in the film, those qualities are transferred to another character named Christabella. Unger stated that she immensely enjoyed playing this role, believing that the portrayal of Dahlia is closely aligned with the profound essence of the game. She did not progress further than the beginning of the video game but relied on materials she found on websites, including character analyses. Unger described her character as a crazy, slightly enigmatic prophet who gains wisdom through suffering, and compared her to Cassandra and John Proctor from the play The Crucible. She immediately accepted the role, which was specifically written for her, even without reading the script. She later referred to her work as an extraordinary psychological journey. Mason stated that Deborah's character had to reach extremes and appear slightly peculiar. Mitchell believed that Unger added a lot to her character, making her appear more realistic.

Played by Alice Krige, Christabella is a cultist and the main antagonist of the film. The character's name is taken from the Silent Hill: Dying Inside comic, where it belonged to a girl who is killed by fanatics. Christabella's portrayal incorporates some traits from Dahlia Gillespie and Claudia Wolf from Silent Hill 3. In contrast to Rose, the antagonist combines elegance and violence. Initially, Alice Krige did not like the script. The actress asked: "What is this? Is this sort of science-fiction/horror?" Krige was unaware that it was based on a video game. She expressed concern regarding the linguistic intricacies associated with the character, finding her impactful dialogue challenging to accurately portray. To prepare for her role, Krige read the book The End of Days by Erna Paris, a book about tyranny during the Spanish Inquisition. Mitchell noted that the actress was very different from her character: "Alice is incredibly playful, sweet, and generous. She's got this enthusiasm and the imagination of a child". The producers stated that Krige was able to breathe life into a toy-like character that could easily stumble and become a caricature. The director approved her casting based on her performances in the films Institute Benjamenta, Twilight of the Ice Nymphs, and Star Trek: First Contact.

=== Filming ===
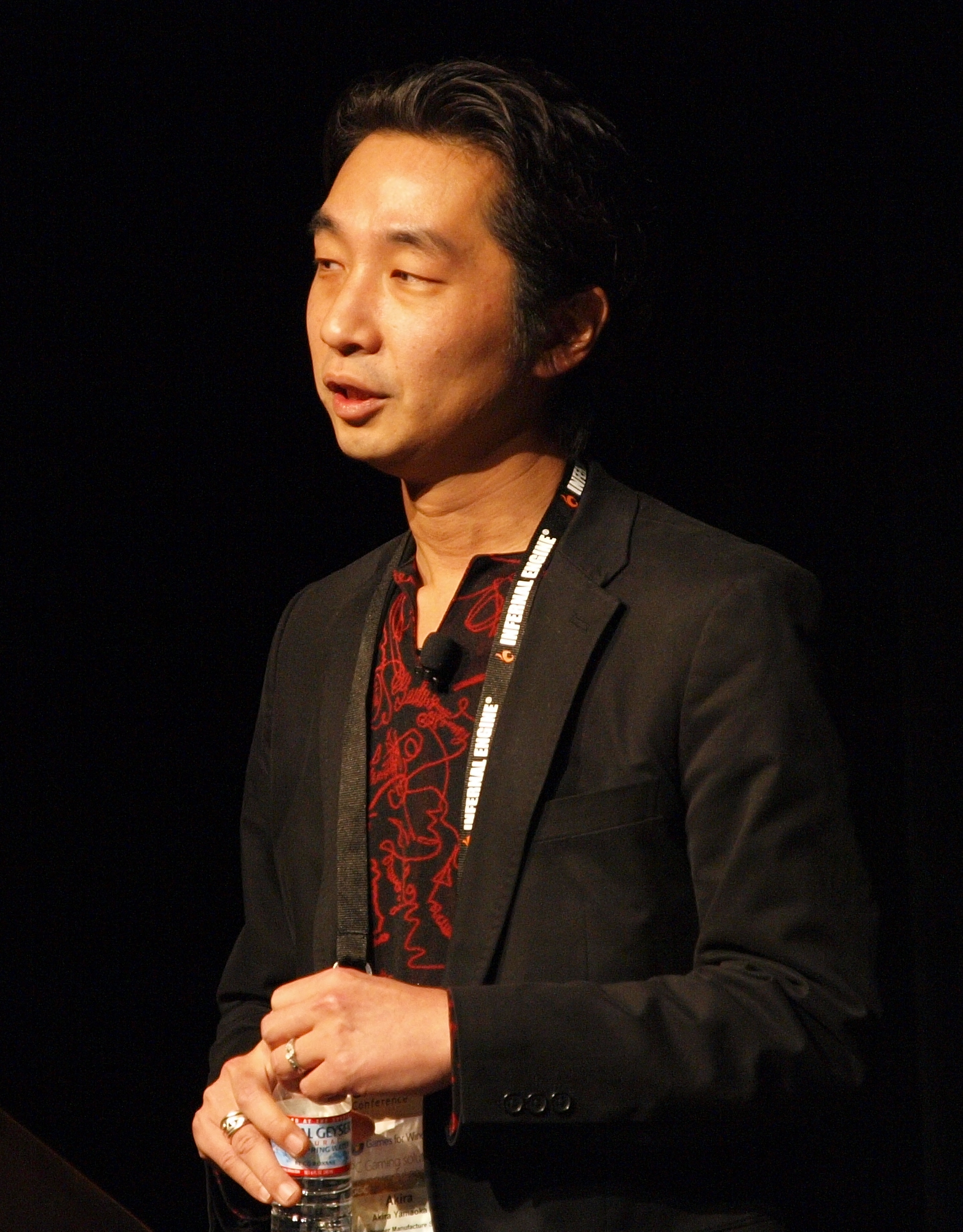
Akira Yamaoka directly participated in the production of the film.

Principal photography commenced on April 25, 2005, and ended three months later on July 22. It took place in various locations in Canada, including Brantford, Hamilton, and Brampton in Ontario; Winnipeg in Manitoba; St. George in New Brunswick, as well as on soundstages in Toronto and on location in Alma College. The developers of the series Team Silent oversaw the entire production process of the film and collaborated closely with the production team, approving or rejecting decisions made by the director, screenwriter, and artists. As a result, the city's appearance was recreated with attention to the smallest details, down to errors in English names of the stores. The filming was done using a crane camera. The technology itself was improved to accurately simulate the operation of the virtual camera from the game.

Mitchell had to tap into her own subconscious to enhance realism, inducing feelings of anxiety and pain in herself to subsequently embody those emotions during the filming. She admitted that encounters with the unknown were somewhat surreal. To depict fear, she asked the production designer to increase the volume of the sound made by the approaching monster through a microphone. This helped make her acting more interactive, rather than simply reacting to lines. The varying weather conditions, ranging from freezing cold to extreme heat, did not have a negative impact on the actors' performances.

After delivering the film for Film editing to the studio, Gans expected to receive at least 10 pages of notes regarding the film's required editing. However, contrary to his expectations, the only comment was about the Australian accent of Mitchell and the English accent of Bean, which were too noticeable in three scenes of the film. According to him, the producers were shocked as they had never seen anything like it before. The next step was passing the censorship. Samuel Hadida was concerned about several scenes, especially the death of Cybil and the barbed wire killing of Christabella, as well as Anna's flaying. The director said, "I wanted to create an unforgettable scene that shows a person being burned alive on a stake. I wanted to avoid using a mannequin [instead of the actress]." In the end, the committee provided documents marked as "Acceptable". This decision was supported by three reasons: the entire story takes place in a fictional world, the plot revolves around a woman trying to save her daughter, and the film hardly uses firearms. Subsequently, the film was banned for children under 15 in England and children under 12 in France. All work on the film was completed 10 days before its release in US theaters. Silent Hill contains 756 special effects shots. In total, $4 million was spent on them. The effects were produced by BUF Compagnie, Mr. X Inc., and C.O.R.E. Digital Pictures studios.

American studio Sony Pictures bought the distribution rights for $14 million for the United States and Latin America to be released under its TriStar Pictures genre film subsidiary. On December 5, 2005, TriStar announced a competition to create the best poster, targeting fans of the series. Anyone could download several photos from the official website, WelcomeToSilentHill.com, and use them as a basis to create the final image. All competition entries were posted on the Internet on January 4, 2006, and a voting process took place. On January 17, specialists from the company selected 5 out of 50 works. On January 20, the finalists were announced, and two days later, the final version of the poster was chosen. The Japanese trailer of the film is voiced by Joe Romersa.

The composers of the film are Akira Yamaoka and Jeff Danna. The music for the film is borrowed from the soundtracks of the first four games in the series. The only track that does not belong to these albums is Johnny Cash's composition of "Ring of Fire". Yamaoka mostly kept his own melodies intact as he wanted to maintain similarities to the game adaptation. The soundtrack, which included vocal tracks, was not released as a standalone release.

=== Technical aspects ===
The film in total lasts 127 minutes. According to information from several publications, there allegedly existed a director's cut of the film that was three and a half hours long, but it was shortened by over 90 minutes at the insistence of the producers, as distributors did not want to deal with a horror film of such length. Gans also worked on creating a "censored" version of the film, which lasts less than 80 minutes. However, according to him, it will never be shown to the public. The director had no control over the release of the film outside of the home region. He referred to the DVD version of the film released in America as "pitiful", citing the catastrophic quality of compression. He spent eight days optimizing the rendering and color grading for the release in the second region.

In an interview, the director stated that the only scene that didn't make it into the final version of the film was a brief conversation sequence involving Christabella in a church with two strangers. However, he also noted the presence of another "unfinished" fragment—the meeting of Anna originally featured her being attacked by an Armless Man near the hotel, during which she is saved by Cybil and Rose and the wounded creature crawls under a car to disappear into a manhole. Due to budget concerns, choreographer Roberto Campanella was sent home for the day, and the director was not satisfied with the footage. To rectify this, the scene was simplified and rewritten without the monster. Mitchell stated that after the completion of principal photography, the opening scene of the film was also reshot.

The film was shot in the Super 35 film format, except the scenes with the darkness, which were filmed in high-definition video, because of its ability to cleanly capture light and digitally manipulate it in post-production. The film contains around 107 different sets specifically used to represent the different versions of the town. The bipedal creatures in the film were played by professional actors or dancers covered in latex and prosthetic makeup. After filming, over 619 visual effects shots were used in the film, with the most prominent uses being the fog that drenches the town, the transitions to darkness, and the insects that surround Red Pyramid. Rotoscoping was used to add the fog and ash effects to shots including live-action actors, and the film made extensive use of set extensions as backdrops.

To maintain the feel of the games, Gans had the sound designer of the original Silent Hill, Akira Yamaoka, flown to the set several times. Additionally, Gans had a 40-inch television brought onto the set, to which he attached a PlayStation 2; Gans then played the original Silent Hill on the system so that the actors and cinematographers could see how Gans wanted to emulate various camera angles and movements.

=== Sets ===
Carmody stated that the development of all Silent Hill locations was a real challenge for the filmmakers. Large-scale sets were built and housed across five soundstages. A total of 108 interior sets were created, (Note: Other sources give 106.) at a cost of $12 million. The design for each scene was storyboarded in the form of manga, employing a range of visual techniques such as zooms, pans, close-ups, and others. Production designer Karol Spier considered the team's task far from easy: it was necessary not only to select appropriate sets, but also to emphasize the texture of materials and convey a sense of time. Filming in Brantford took place on a street of abandoned houses and shops that was being prepared for redevelopment. The buildings were repainted in grey tones, and details and alterations were added to create the impression that the town had been deserted for 30 years. Specially installed devices filled the street with fog. Construction of a section of mountainside and a stretch of asphalt road took eight weeks. To develop the look of an abandoned town, Spier studied photographs of the Chernobyl Nuclear Power Plant taken after the accident, as well as images of an abandoned psychiatric hospital in northern New York State.

A still from the making-of documentary film Path of Darkness. Karol Spier sought to convey the church interior in dark tones.

The real layout of classrooms in an actual school did not align well with the decorators' concept for Midwich School. The original space had to be rebuilt, and some segments were filmed in other buildings. For these scenes, walls were prepared to correspond to three historical phases. Although the sequences were shot in order, the crew had to prepare all surface finishes at once. For scenes set in the past, ordinary painted panels with saturated colours and smooth surfaces were used. For present-day scenes, the painted walls were artificially aged: the texture of flaking paint was emphasized and the colours were darkened. Brookhaven Hospital was represented by several sets, including the second floor of the building used for the school, as well as a basement section where scenes in an elevator were filmed.

To create the space where the town's community meetings took place, the decorators used an old factory. Its exterior was conceived in the style of antique photographs, with a simple design and straight lines. After filming the assembly scenes, parts of the floor were dismantled. The crew lit fires on set to simulate the aftermath of a major blaze. Spier remarked that it was the "dirtiest scene in the entire film. Anyone who came onto the set wearing white ended up black by the end of the shoot."

The church set was among the first on which the decorators began work. The team had extensive visual reference material, including photographs of the exteriors and interiors of various churches. Wood was one of the primary materials used in its construction. Overall, the layout and details of the Silent Hill church were typical of many churches, except for the absence of icons; instead, the centre of the room was dominated by a large mural depicting a witch burning at the stake, and a kind of arena-like structure in the middle intended for gatherings. Building this set took nearly eight weeks. The mural was created by set decorator John Fraser, who spent almost three weeks on it. "He had to work at night. During the day we built the main set, and in the evening, when we finished, he would begin. In the morning, when we returned to the stage, we would find some new detail," Spier said. The mural was based on a photograph of members of the art department dressed in costume. The staircases were modeled on an image from an old German film depicting witch burnings. Old miners's coats were suspended from the ceiling; the idea was inspired by photographs of an actual mine where miners stored their clothing in the same way. In the original concept, the building's façade was intended to resemble a Masonic castle. The staircase leading up to the church was built on a separate stage.

=== Stunts ===
Stunt consultant Steve Lucescu believed that there was considerable work on Silent Hill, despite it being far removed from spectacle cinema. His task consisted of training the actors, teaching them correct movement and firearms handling. Mitchell and Holden "proved to be exemplary students, ready to follow my instructions exactly, no matter how difficult they seemed. They tried to make every moment of their performances as natural as possible. The girls did an amazing job, because in addition to the physical demands they also had to act," he said. Holden also received advice from a real detective. Sybil had no protection during her fight with the cultists, whereas protective metal plates were worn beneath the miners's robes. As a result, each time she struck them, Holden received an abrasion or bruise. The scene in which Radha and Laurie find themselves trapped in a small ventilation room was filmed from the front so that viewers could see the actresses’ faces. Holden believed she would have to use her imagination in this sequence; however, the knife cutting through the door was real. She had to move her head at a specific moment, otherwise there was a risk of being struck by the blade. Mitchell found the boiler-room scene difficult, as she had to bend backward quickly each time the knife appeared. During rehearsals the sequence was performed at a low speed, but with each subsequent repetition the pace increased until it reached what was required.

Holden described her final scene as follows:

She regains consciousness as the fire begins to burn her feet and eat into her eyes. How do you prepare for something like that? I was up on a 35-foot ladder. It was frightening; the ropes painfully dug into my skin when they started lowering me over the flames. Sparks reached me. I remember thinking: one careless movement—and I'm in the fire. So the torment, fear, and heat were entirely real.

=== Monsters ===
Several supernatural creatures appear in the film: the Red Pyramid, the Grey Children, the Armless, the Janitor, the Cockroaches, and the Dark Nurses. Their appearance and behaviour were the result of coordinated efforts by designer Patrick Tatopoulos, prosthetics artist and co-designer Paul Jones, costume designer Wendy Partridge, visual effects producer Holly Radcliffe, and choreographer Roberto Campanella.

The monsters were intended to inspire fear, provoke unease, be slightly beautiful and utterly repellent, somewhat touching and eerie. Gans immediately decided that the creatures had to be designed so that viewers could not remain indifferent; they needed to draw attention. Two teams worked on the creatures: one built monster puppets with various effects, while the other created the make-up. Particular attention was paid to texture. To retain a measure of humanity, Tatopoulos attempted to convey human suffering in their designs. Campanella coordinated the movement of all the film's monsters. The roles were performed by professional dancers, as only they could accurately convey broken, contorted physicality and reproduce unsettling, strange, jerky motions.

Gans did not want to present the monsters as typical creatures that leap out from around a corner. All of them are manifestations of Alessa's consciousness, embodying a strange, naive, and candid sense of cruelty that only a child can experience. In his view, they resembled broken dolls more than frightening beasts. The real monsters, he argued, were people. The director also offered several other interpretations. The simplest was that the creatures were victims of Alessa's revenge and represented grotesque figures of doomed people. Gans also suggested that they were nothing more than hallucinations.

In the film, the Dark Nurses resemble the Nurses from Silent Hill 2, but in their behaviour they more closely recall the Mannequins.

Most of the Grey Children and the Cockroaches were created using computer-generated imagery. One of the Children was portrayed by the short-statured actress Yvonne Anger, whose suit was made of spandex with a silicone coating to create the effect of translucent skin. The costume design emphasized a lopsided head. Tatopoulos noted that the Child had a human, elongated, twisted face with an open, seemingly howling mouth. The designer did not turn the monster's skull entirely, shifting only the skin. All elements of the costume were glued on over two and a half hours each day. In the Child's suit, the only opening for the eyes was the ear. "Honestly, I never saw her real face. We talked to her a lot and discussed things, but she was always in the mask and remains a mysterious woman to me," Mitchell said.

Dancer Michel Côté played the Armless. Already during rehearsal, the actor tried tucking his arms behind his back and moving on half-bent legs. "I caught myself thinking that even without the costume he looks very strange," Campanella said. The costume consisted of two parts: tight silicone trousers tinted the colour of corpse skin, and a sleeveless plastic jacket. A silicone hood was pulled over the top, enclosing the actor in a kind of vise. Air was fed into the mask, with the tube routed from beneath the costume. Tatopoulos designed the outfit so that it had a small opening at chest level to provide ventilation, and, when necessary, a reservoir of water tinted with black pigment could be placed inside. When an assistant pressed a button, the Armless would fire the liquid at its victim. The costume had no eyeholes, so during filming the actor could not see anything. On set, the monster acquired several nicknames, one of which was "the Member", because it resembled a large torn condom. The character was also referred to as the Demon Patient.

The Nurses wore ash-coloured uniforms resembling skin. They appeared like marionettes frozen in time, and came to life as soon as light appeared. The idea for the faceless nurse costumes was taken from the game. Silicone masks were created first, and then paints were used to give them different frightening expressions. Because the dresses had to cling tightly to the actresses's bodies, the designer tailored them to the measurements of each of the 20 women.

Roberto Campanella performed two roles in the film: the Janitor and the Red Pyramid. The former looked like a human corpse folded in half, with its legs fastened to its neck with barbed wire. It was devised by the filmmakers and had no direct counterpart in the game. Two versions were prepared for the effect. The first was a plaster sculpture—an exact copy of Campanella—used in the scene in which Rose removed a keychain from its mouth. The second involved Campanella himself, in appropriate make-up, with a pair of artificial legs attached to a belt and pulled up with imitation barbed wire. His costume consisted of rags covering part of the body and green optical trousers that were later removed in post-production. The Red Pyramid's look was developed by Tatopoulos, who sought to add elegance to its proportions. Some wardrobe elements were made in Toronto, including a leather skirt and 15-inch platform boots; one boot was slightly lower than the other to create a halting gait.

== Release ==
Silent Hill was released theatrically on April 21, 2006, in the United States, Canada, the United Kingdom, and Ireland. The film played in theaters for 59 days in total. The chosen release date was described as intentional: the number 21 is significant in Silent Hill 4: The Room, in which the antagonist Walter Sullivan seeks to kill 21 victims, while the number four—denoting April—has associations with death in Japan. The film's poster of a mouthless Alessa was the subject of some vandalism, with passersby drawing cartoon mouths or applying stickers where her mouth would be.

== Home media ==
In North America, Sony Pictures Home Entertainment released Silent Hill on DVD, Blu-ray, and UMD on August 22, 2006. The DVD and Blu-ray were issued in both Anamorphic widescreen (2.35:1) and pan and scan versions and included a Dolby Digital 5.1 audio track. The releases also included special features, including a six-part making-of documentary (Path of Darkness: Making 'Silent Hill). The film was also released on UMD for the PlayStation Portable on August 22, 2006; the disc included the film in 1.78 widescreen with Dolby Digital 2.0 and subtitles, but no special features.

The film was later issued for sale on DVD (widescreen and fullscreen editions), Blu-ray, and UMD on August 22, 2008.

The French Blu-ray edition, released on October 13, 2009, included audio commentaries by Gans, Mason, and editor Sebastien Prangere, a series of interviews, and the 90-minute documentary Silent Hill: Entre deux mondes. On March 28, 2013, a box set was released on Amazon.fr containing the first and second films in the series in DVD, DVD/Blu-ray, and Blu-ray 3D/DVD configurations; the releases were bundled with a Pyramid Head statuette (a limited run of 1,500) and a 36-page booklet.

On July 9, 2019, Shout! Factory released a two-disc Collector's Edition Blu-ray of Silent Hill through its Scream Factory label, featuring a new HD remaster and new bonus content, including cast and crew interviews and a commentary track with cinematographer Dan Laustsen.

== Reception ==
=== Box office ===
Silent Hill opened in 2,932 theaters and earned $20,152,598 in the United States during its opening weekend, debuting at number one at the U.S. box office. It grossed $46,982,632 in the United States and $100,605,135 worldwide. During its opening weekend, the film drew approximately the same number of viewers as Resident Evil had in its initial release. By August 13, it had been shown on 721 screens across 13 different international markets.

On Box Office Mojo's domestic chart for video game adaptations, Silent Hill ranks 18th. Box Office Mojo also includes the film in its "Video Game Shoot-Out" box office showdown feature.

In the first week of its DVD release, 727,839 units were sold, generating $12,341,602 in revenue; by November 13, 2006, the film earned $30.51 million in revenue from DVD sales.

=== Critical response ===
According to the distributor, advance screenings of Silent Hill were never given to critics. On the review aggregator website Rotten Tomatoes, 34% of 112 critics' reviews are positive, with an average rating of 4.8/10. The website's consensus reads: "Silent Hill is visually impressive, but as with many video game adaptations, it's plagued by inane dialogue, a muddled plot, and an overlong runtime." Metacritic, which uses a weighted average, assigned the film a score of 31 out of 100, based on 21 critics, indicating "generally unfavorable" reviews. The film has an average rating of 2.9 out of 5 from 22 French critics on AlloCiné. Audiences polled by CinemaScore gave the film an average grade "C" on an A+ to F scale.

James Berardinelli of ReelViews awarded the film two and a half stars out of four, opining that it "is overlong, with too many unnecessary scenes" and that "a lot of the movie seems like pointless running around", but added that it "looks great" and "packs in a few scary moments and offers a nicely ambiguous conclusion". Roger Ebert of the Chicago Sun-Times gave one and a half stars out of four, calling it "an incredibly good-looking film", but noting that he "did not understand the story" and criticizing how "all through the movie, characters are pausing in order to offer arcane back-stories and historical perspectives and metaphysical insights and occult orientations". Don R. Lewis of Film Threat praised the visuals but wrote that "this entire film is downright confusing and not in an intriguing way", calling it "the best-looking bad film I've ever seen". James Dyer of Empire noted the film's visual resemblance to the game, citing grotesque creatures and familiar locations recreated with close attention to detail; he argued that this fidelity was also the film's central problem, as he found the story and unclear mythology remained largely unchanged, producing an ineffective adaptation built from repeated movement between set-pieces. Maitland McDonagh of TV Guide wrote that the film squandered its carefully recreated atmosphere, calling it a "gaming anomaly" in which characters and backstory mattered as much as the action, and noting its focus on female characters. Marc Savlov of The Austin Chronicle suggested the film drew on Dante's Peak, H. P. Lovecraft, industrial music group Einstürzende Neubauten, and Lucio Fulci; he criticized Avary's screenplay as a mixture of demonic incoherence and pseudo-religious imagery, while arguing the film's main attraction lay in its brutal, nightmare imagery rather than plot or character.

Lou Lumenick of the New York Post described the film as a great-looking but incoherent supernatural thriller featuring a missing child, strange inscriptions, and religious slogans; he wrote that he did not understand the characters' actions, and concluded that after the cries of "Burn her!" he wanted to set the film on fire. Owen Gleiberman of Entertainment Weekly gave a score of D+, stating that "a few of the images are startling" but "Silent Hill is mostly paralyzing in its vagueness". Dennis Harvey of Variety opined that "above-average interest is generated for a time by [the] elaborate visual package", but "in the end, Silent Hill degenerates into an overblown replay of all those Twilight Zone and Stephen King stories in which outsiders stumble upon a time-warped location from which there's no escape". According to Nathan Lee of The New York Times, "It begins as a quest, develops into a ghost-town mystery, devolves into a preposterous cautionary tale about witchcraft and religious fundamentalism, and wraps up like the outrageously overwrought fantasy of a movie nerd obsessed with horror who has been given obscene amounts of money to adapt a video game." Bill Gallo of Village Voice considered the film pointless, filled with clichéd scenes and cheap effects lacking tension. Jan Stuart, while praising the visual effects, regretted that they were tied to "something so banal as a rationale. The explanation for all these oddball doings, when it arrives, is yet another convoluted spin on those old saws, witchcraft and religious fanaticism."

Critics who were more receptive to the film tended to praise its atmosphere and production design, while some still saw weaknesses in dialogue and plotting. E! Online graded the film B, praising its sustained atmosphere and visual design but opining that its storytelling and character material was comparatively weaker. A Mountain Xpress review described the film as "far stronger on atmosphere and imagery than on plot" and argued that "the power of the individual sequences" was "nothing if not nightmarish", even while calling some of Avary's dialogue "risibly bad." ComingSoon.net similarly concluded that, despite narrative shortcomings, the film was "genuinely creepy" and singled out its visual strengths, calling it "one of the best video game adaptations to date." Alexander Chekulaev of Mir Fantastiki called the film a model for video game adaptations, praising the setting (a pastel, pearl-gray landscape that "explodes" into a brutal crimson nightmare), the monster designs, and Jodelle Ferland's performance; he also emphasized the film's atmosphere of horror and anxiety characteristic of the game series. Afisha critic Roman Volobuev compared the film to Grand Guignol, describing it as "beautiful and cruel"; he argued that Gans worked directly with the "material of evil" rather than with surfaces and textures, and compared the film's immediacy to works such as Hellraiser and The Cell. In games media, MasGamers called it one of the best adaptations, finding it "atmospheric, unsettling... and very faithful to the games", and later adding that it was "a visual marvel." Spanish outlet Espinof was more mixed, framing the film as a "failed commercial product" and highlighted "three brutal scenes" among its strongest moments. A Total DVD reviewer wrote that, despite mixed critical response, the film acquired cult status both among fans of the video game and among horror viewers outside gaming communities.

In a 2012 poll attributed to LoveFilm, the film ranked first among video game adaptations with 15% of respondents' votes, ahead of Lara Croft: Tomb Raider (14%) and Resident Evil (13%). In a list of the best and worst video game adaptations published by Time Out, the film ranked first among the "best" entries. GamesRadar+ also ranked it first among video game film adaptations. In 2013, James Stephanie Sterling stated that it was "one of the better adaptations out there". In 2019, CBR wrote that the film was "arguably the best [video game adaptation]". Flixist called the film "easily one of the best video game based movies ever made". In 2022, Polygon wrote, "While horror-seekers and video game fans of 2006 bristled at the fact that the movie didn't stay true to the source material, a decade of (mostly) bad Silent Hill entries has proven just how good the movie really was." The same year Fangoria similarly stated that the film is the best adaptation of a horror game to date. In 2024, Destructoid also listed it among the best video game adaptations, writing "in the 18 years since the movie was released, reviews have been much more appreciative of the story and setting. It's definitely something of a cult classic at this point, and even though it runs a little long at just over two hours, it stands the test of time for horror fans." In retrospect, SlashFilm, GameSpot, and Tom's Guide described the film as having developed a cult following, and Tom's Guide also called it the best horror film adaptation of a video game.

=== Accolades ===
Year	Award	Category	Recipient(s)	Result
2006	Golden Trailer Awards	Best Horror	Silent Hill	Nominated
2006	Teen Choice Awards	Choice Movie: Thriller	Silent Hill	Nominated
2006	Australian Film Institute Awards	International Award for Best Actress	Radha Mitchell	Nominated
2006	Fangoria Chainsaw Awards	Chick You Don't Wanna Mess With (Heroine)	Radha Mitchell	Nominated
2006	Fangoria Chainsaw Awards	Creepiest Kid	Jodelle Ferland	Nominated
2006	Fangoria Chainsaw Awards	Looks That Kill (Best Makeup FX)	Silent Hill	Nominated
2006	Fangoria Chainsaw Awards	Sickest FX (Best Special FX)	Silent Hill	Nominated
2007	Directors Guild of Canada Craft Awards	Sound Editing – Feature Film	Jane Tattersall et al.	Nominated

== Sequels ==
A sequel, Silent Hill: Revelation, taking place six years after the first film's events, was released on October 26, 2012. Christophe Gans did not return to direct the sequel; after saying in 2006 that he was preparing an Onimusha film, producer Don Carmody later said that Gans would not be back in the director's chair because he "wants to direct something new". Roger Avary was originally attached to write the screenplay and had written the first draft before he was arrested for vehicular homicide in 2009. M. J. Bassett was hired to write and direct the sequel. The sequel holds an 8% rating on Rotten Tomatoes.

On January 31, 2020, Christophe Gans stated that he was working on another Silent Hill film. On October 19, 2022, a new Silent Hill film was officially announced to be in production, entitled Return to Silent Hill, with Gans returning as director, co-writing the film with Sandra Vo-Anh and Will Schneider.

== See also ==
- List of films based on video games
