= Everyone's Life =

2017 French comedy film

- Directed by: Claude Lelouch
- Written by: Claude Lelouch; Valérie Perrin
- Produced by: Claude Lelouch; Samuel Hadida; Jean-Paul De Vidas
- Cinematography: Robert Alazraki
- Edited by: Stéphane Mazalaigue
- Music by: Laurent Couson
- Production companies: Les Films 13; Davis Films
- Distributed by: Metropolitan Filmexport
- Release date: 15 March 2017
- Running time: 113 minutes
- Country: France
- Language: French
- Budget: $8.6 million
- Box office: $2.2 million

Everyone's Life (Chacun sa vie et son intime conviction) is a 2017 French comedy film written and directed by Claude Lelouch. This was the final film appearance of singer Johnny Hallyday, who died the same year as the film's release.

== Synopsis ==
Twelve tales about intimate convictions leading to a thirteenth.

== Casting ==
The film reunites several celebrated French stars.

- Jean Dujardin : Jean the policeman
- Julie Ferrier : Nathalie Richer / Judith
- Gérard Darmon : : Paul Richer
- Johnny Hallyday : Johnny Hallyday Look-a-like/Himself
- Christopher Lambert : Antoine de Vidas
- Marianne Denicourt: Marianne de Vidas
- Mathilde Seigner : Mathilde
- Stéphane De Groodt: Stéphane
- Nadia Farès: Nadia
- Antoine Duléry:The cop/The mayor
- Béatrice Dalle: Clémentine
- Ramzy Bedia: Tahar
- Déborah François: Jessica
- Chantal Ladesou:The tax auditor
- Liane Foly: Eugénie Flora
- Elsa Zylberstein:The Countess
- Vincent Pérez:The Count
- Rufus:The taxi driver
- Zinedine Soualem: Zinedine
- Vanessa Demouy:Lola
- Éric Dupond-Moretti:The president
- Philippe Lellouche: Philippe
- Francis Huster:The attorney general
- William Leymergie:The Parisian attorney
- Jean-Marie Bigard: The optimist doctor
- Samuel Benchetrit: Samuel
- Isabelle Pasco
- Isabelle de Hertogh:The judge
- Kendji Girac:Kendji
- Dimitri Naiditch
- Laurent Couson
- Solenne Rodier
- Michel Leeb
- Thomas Levet
- Pauline Lefevre
- Angelica Sarre
- David Marouani
- Raphaël Mezrahi

== Production ==
The film was shot between July and August 2016.

Most of the scenes have been shot in Bourgogne, precisely in Beaune and Dijon.
