= Killing Zoe =

1993 film by Roger Avary

- Theatrical release poster
- Directed by: Roger Avary
- Written by: Roger Avary
- Produced by: Samuel Hadida; Jeff Schechtman
- Starring: Eric Stoltz; Jean-Hugues Anglade; Julie Delpy; Gary Kemp; Kario Salem
- Cinematography: Tom Richmond
- Edited by: Kathryn Himoff
- Music by: tomandandy
- Production companies: Davis-Films; Live Entertainment; PFG Entertainment
- Distributed by: October Films (United States); Metropolitan Filmexport (France)
- Release dates: October 1993 (MIFED (Mercato internazionale del film e del documentario) & Raindance); August 19, 1994 (United States)
- Running time: 96 minutes
- Countries: United States; France
- Languages: English; French
- Budget: $1.5 million
- Box office: $1.3 million

Killing Zoe is a 1993 crime film written and directed by Roger Avary and starring Eric Stoltz, Jean-Hugues Anglade and Julie Delpy. The story details a safe cracker named Zed who returns to France to aid an old friend in performing a doomed bank heist. Killing Zoe was labeled by Roger Ebert as "Generation X's first bank caper movie." In 2019, Avary directed the semi-sequel Lucky Day.

== Plot ==
Zed, a professional safe-cracker, comes to Paris to help a childhood friend, Eric, with a bank heist. While in the taxi on his way to the hotel, the cab driver offers to procure a sex worker for him in the evening. As Zed emerges from the shower, the sex worker, Zoe, arrives. After having sex, they talk amicably and express their mutual affection. Zoe confides that she is studying art and has a "very boring" day job. They are interrupted when Eric barges in and brusquely sends Zoe out of the room. Eric takes Zed back to his residence, where Zed meets Eric's friends. Eric explains his plans: the following day is Bastille Day and virtually everything is closed except for a holding bank they plan to rob. Zed forgoes his rest time to spend the night partying with Eric and his friends at a seedy jazz club, which Eric refers to as 'the real Paris'. As they binge, Eric confides to Zed that he has HIV, which he contracted through intravenous drug use.

The next day, Zed is awakened by Eric as they prepare to enter the bank. Donning carnival masks, Eric's team quickly kill anybody who fails to cooperate as Zed is escorted to the bank's safe. Their plans begin to fall apart as the police show up, with the team realizing they will either have to shoot their way out of the bank or go to jail for life. Eric blows open a vault with an explosive, finding a large supply of gold bars, but the thieves cannot leave the bank alive with their fortune. Tensions rise even higher when Zed recognizes Zoe – who coincidentally works at the bank – and attempts to protect her, much to Eric's fury. A gunfight erupts between Eric's team and the police, with Zed caught in the middle. Most of the thieves are killed, leaving Zed and Eric to fight each other. The police kill Eric. Injured, Zed is led away quickly by Zoe, who falsely states that he is a bank customer. They drive away in her car, where Zoe promises Zed that when he gets well, she will show him the 'real' Paris.

== Cast ==
- Eric Stoltz as Zed
- Jean-Hugues Anglade as Eric
- Julie Delpy as Zoe
- Gary Kemp as Oliver
- Kario Salem as Jean
- Tai Thai as François
- Bruce Ramsay as Ricardo
- Salvator Xuereb as Claude
- Cecilia Peck as Martina
- Ron Jeremy Hyatt as Bank Concierge
- David Richard Thompson as Burnt Vault Guard
- Djimon Hounsou as Voice of Moïse

== Production ==
Killing Zoe was director Roger Avary's feature directorial debut. When scouting filming locations for Reservoir Dogs, the crew found a bank. Producer Lawrence Bender phoned a writer he knew, Avary, and asked if he had any screenplays that took place in a bank. Avary quickly wrote the script for Killing Zoe in a week or two. Avary stated he wanted to make "an art-house film for both the coffeehouse crowd and the exploitation crowd."

Set in Paris, the film was shot almost entirely in Los Angeles, California. Only the opening and end credits roll and some small car driving clips were filmed in France. In a DVD interview, Avary explains how he wanted to make a film about how nihilistic he felt his generation was and said that watching Stoltz in the film, was like seeing his evil twin come into creation. He wrote the script specifically for Stoltz. Avary stated that, as a first time director, it was a dream to work with actors as talented as Jean-Hugues Anglade, Eric Stoltz and Julie Delpy. Killing Zoe is notable as the first feature film to use the new Otto Nemenz Swing & Tilt lenses, which were used during the heroin sequences for perspective distortion instead of their original purpose of perspective correction.

== Reception ==
The first market screening of Killing Zoe took place at the Raindance Film Market in October 1993. The film premiered in North America at the Sundance Film Festival in 1994. The film won the Grand Prize award at the 5th Yubari International Fantastic Film Festival held in February 1994. Jury members that year included Roger Vadim, Dario Argento, and Dennis Hopper. The film went on to win the 1994 Cannes Prix Très Spécial.

Rotten Tomatoes gives the film a score of 34% based on 29 reviews. The website's "Critics Consensus" for the film reads, "Senselessly violent and mean-spirited, Killing Zoe fails to deliver a much needed cleverness to back up its hyper-stylized flourishes." Metacritic, which uses a weighted average, assigned the film a score of 49 out of 100, based on 22 critics, indicating "mixed or average" reviews.

While some have speculated the title of the film derives from the assumption that Zed contracted HIV from having Eric's blood spill on him and he will thus pass it on to Zoe, Roger Avary has stated, "Zoe means 'life' in Greek, so the title of the movie can be interpreted as 'Killing Life.' "
