= Lucky Day (film) =

2019 action crime film

- Theatrical release poster
- Directed by: Roger Avary
- Written by: Roger Avary
- Produced by: Don Carmody; Samuel Hadida
- Starring: Luke Bracey; Nina Dobrev; Crispin Glover; Ella Ryan Quinn; Clé Bennett; Clifton Collins Jr.
- Cinematography: Brendan Steacy
- Edited by: Sylvie Landra
- Music by: tomandandy
- Production companies: Davis Films; Avary; Don Carmody Productions
- Distributed by: Metropolitan Filmexport (France); Elevation Pictures (Canada)
- Release date: September 18, 2019 (France)
- Running time: 99 minutes
- Countries: France; Canada
- Languages: English; French
- Box office: $222,945

Lucky Day is a 2019 action crime film directed and written by Roger Avary. The film stars Luke Bracey and Nina Dobrev. This film is a semi-sequel of Killing Zoe.

== Plot ==
Former safecracker Red is released from prison after two years. Red reconnects with his wife Chloe, their daughter "Bea" Beatrice (who now only speaks in her mother's native French after learning it from her nanny Lolita) and his former colleague Le Roi, who has been holding $500,000 in untraceable bearer bonds for him from their last heist in his pawn shop's hidden basement; Red's parole officer DPO Ernesto Sanchez remains suspicious of him and Le Roi. In Le Roi's basement, Red attempts to crack his safe, which is identical to the one from the bank he had robbed but finds he is no longer able to do so due to a lack of practice.

Meanwhile, contract killer Luc, recently taken off of the no-fly list, enters the country searching for Red, leaving the airport by killing a man and taking his car. While acquiring weaponry from an associate of his, Jean-Jacques, at his bar, having sex with Jean-Jacques's girlfriend as "payment" for the weaponry, Jean-Jacques explains to his friends, arms importers Louis and Pierre, that Luc is in charge of "retirements" for "the Connection" and that they should be as terrified of him as he himself is, begging the two not to insult Luc or try to kill him. After Luc returns, Jean-Jacques introduces him to Louis and Pierre, to which Luc responds by taunting the pair. After Jean-Jacques notices his girlfriend hasn't returned, he inquires about her, Luc claims off-hand to have killed her to prevent there being any small talk, Jean-Jacques is quietly enraged by this and nods at Louis to kill him. Louis insults Luc and attempts to shoot him, only to be shot by Luc first. Luc then asks Pierre whether he was aware that Jean-Jacques has been embezzling the Connection. Jean-Jacques then goes for his shotgun only for Luc to shoot him, inadvertently setting off Jean-Jacques's gun and killing Pierre. As he makes his way through town, Luc shoots the owner of a lowrider and joyrides it around town, before killing two cops after they attempt to stop him.

At the art gallery at which she is preparing to have an exhibition of her paintings that night, Chloe's boss Derrek Blarney attempts to proposition her, only for her to reveal that Red has been released from prison. Outraged at the rejection, Derrek threatens to take back the loan Chloe has been living off of since Red's incarceration if she does not sell any paintings that night. That night, Red and Le Roi attend Chloe's exhibition; Le Roi restrains Red from insulting the critics who are insulting his wife's character. Red questions Chloe about Ernesto Sanchez' presence at the exhibition, revealing that he is an avid art collector and is genuinely interested in the art. Elsewhere, Luc arrives at Red's house looking for him, killing Lolita as Bea flees, before discovering the location of the exhibition from a card left on Chloe's table. As Derrek attempts to again seduce Chloe, Bea arrives looking for her; Red spots Luc arriving and shouts a warning to her, allowing Chloe and Bea to flee as Luc shoots in Red's direction, mortally wounding Le Roi, who gives Red the key to his safe. Ernesto Sanchez then shoots at Luc, who in response ends up killing almost all of the critics present, before leaving to pursue Red.

After Luc climbs atop Red's car in an attempt to kill him, Red shoots Luc's gun at the roof, knocking him off. After Chloe questions him on Luc's presence, Red reveals Luc is the brother of his partner in the bank heist who was shot by police, and that he would likely be looking for the bearer bonds Red had pretended were destroyed, which in fact he had Le Roi smuggle via tunnels leading to his basement. They decide to proceed to Le Roi's basement to retrieve the money. As Red enters, Luc catches up with the car on-foot, holding Chloe hostage as Bea runs inside towards her father. After Red offers Luc the bonds and himself in exchange for his family's lives, Luc reveals that he was unaware of the bonds' existence and merely blames Red for living in his brother's place, considering them a nice surprise for after he kills him and his family. Red moves in front of her as Luc fires, unintentionally knocking her into the safe. Luc overlooks the short-breathed Red and locks the safe, informing him that he will hear her suffocating before he dies from the gunshot.

Luc then pursues Chloe as she flees into the tunnels connected to Le Roi's basement; Chloe manages to impale him with a rake, before fleeing back to the basement and up into Le Roi's shop. Meanwhile, Red is revealed to have been alive, Luc's bullet having been blocked by Le Roi's key to the safe, which has been rendered unusable. As Red tells Bea through the safe to conserve her breaths, Luc returns and holds him at gunpoint. As he prepares to shoot him, Ernesto Sanchez arrives, having been retrieved by Chloe, and orders Luc to drop his weapon. After Luc instead tries to kill him, Ernesto Sanchez shoots him several times. Luc sets off a pair of charged explosives that disintegrate himself and the bearer bonds.

As Red tries to open the safe, Ernesto Sanchez tries to arrest him for breaking his parole, only to allow him to try to crack the safe upon learning Bea is inside. Although nervous, Red manages to free Bea, and the family hug. Looking at the happy family, Ernesto Sanchez decides not to arrest Red, and remarks at his dissatisfaction at how the evening has unfolded, and that he likely will receive commendation for having stopped Luc.

Several days later, while Bea pays her respect to Lolita's ashes and Chloe remarks that their water is about to be shut off, Red offers to move the family back to Chloe's native France despite himself not speaking French once his parole is over. Suddenly, Derrek arrives to reveal that Chloe's paintings have sold out for hundreds of thousands due to them having been spattered with "the blood of her critics" during Luc's shootout at the art gallery, before giving her cut of the proceedings and asking when her next art show will be. As the family closes the door in Derrek's face, Bea speaks English for the first time to declare to the audience that it is "The End", before the family dances happily together at their newfound wealth.

As the credits roll, it is revealed Red is still in his prison cell, looking at a picture of Chloe. He then starts to pace back and forth in the small cell, leaving it up to the audience to imagine if the entirety of the film has been a dream.

== Cast ==
- Luke Bracey as "Red"
- Nina Dobrev as Chloe
- Crispin Glover as Luc Chaltiel
- Clé Bennett as Le Roi
- Clifton Collins Jr. as DPO Ernesto Sanchez
- Ella Ryan Quinn as Beatrice
- David Hewlett as Derrek Blarney
- Tomer Sisley as Jean-Jacques
- Nadia Farès as Lolita
- Roberto Campanella as Pierre
- Mark Dacascos as Louis
- Eric Stoltz as the voice of authority
- Zion Forrest Lee as Gavin McAnus
- Darrin Baker as Officer Lundquist
- Scott Faulconbridge as Officer McClane
- Josie Ho as Mrs. Kok
- Gabrielle Graham as Sabine
- Maverick as Maverick The Dog

== Reception ==
On the review aggregation website, Rotten Tomatoes, the film holds an approval rating of 9% based on 11 reviews, with an average score of 3.5/10. Metacritic, which uses a weighted average, assigned the film a score of 18 out of 100 based on 5 critics, indicating "overwhelming dislike".
