= Belleville Cop =

2018 French comedy film

- Original-release poster
- Le Flic de Belleville
- Directed by: Rachid Bouchareb
- Written by: Rachid Bouchareb; Marion Doussot; Larry Gross
- Produced by: Allen Bain; Jean Bréhat; Samuel Hadida; Victor Hadida; Louise Lovegrove; Muriel Merlin; Claudia Roca Bravo
- Starring: Omar Sy; Luis Guzmán; Franck Gastambide; Biyouna
- Music by: Éric Neveux
- Production companies: Tessalit Productions; Davis Films
- Distributed by: Metropolitan Filmexport
- Release date: 17 October 2018
- Running time: 111 minutes
- Country: France
- Languages: French, English
- Budget: $17M
- Box office: $7,431,345

Belleville Cop (French: Le Flic de Belleville) is a French police comedy film directed by Rachid Bouchareb and premiere-released in 2018. The lead actors are Omar Sy, Luis Guzmán and Franck Gastambide.

The film was presented at French Cinepanorama (Hong Kong French Film Festival) 2018, on three screens.

== Plot ==
Born in Belleville (Paris neighbourhood), Sebastian Bouchard, known as "Baaba", became a police officer. He is determined to stay in Belleville, to the chagrin of his girlfriend who wishes to live elsewhere. Baaba struggles to get away from his slightly invasive mother.

One night in a restaurant, Roland, his childhood friend, is murdered before his eyes. Roland was a liaison officer at the Consulate General of France in Miami and was visiting Paris for an investigation into drug trafficking. Baaba then decides to go to Florida, taking his mother with him. In Miami, he is accompanied by a jaded and irascible local cop, Ricardo Garcia. The two men will then be forced to work together despite everything that separates them.

== Cast ==
- Omar Sy as Sébastian "Baaba" Bouchard
- Luis Guzmán as Lieutenant Ricardo Garcia
- Biyouna as Zohra, the mother of Baaba
- Diem Nguyen as Lin
- Ériq Ebouaney as Ladji Toure
- Isaka Sawadogo as Aboulaye
- Maïouna Gueye as Iman Toure
- Julie Ferrier as The Consule
- Franck Gastambide as Roland
- Christopher Journet as Patrice Boyer
- Mike Benitez as Captain Mendez
- Didier Menin as Commissaire Simon
- Astrid Bayiha as Press Officer
- Matthew Chizever as Sergeant Morris
- Antoni Corone as Contremaitre

== Production ==
In 2011, Rachid Bouchareb announced his desire to make an "American trilogy" on relations between the United States and the Arab world. The first of the three films should have been the buddy movie Belleville Cop, with Jamel Debbouze and Queen Latifah. The first finally became the TV movie Just like a Woman, a road movie with Sienna Miller and Golshifteh Farahani, broadcast in 2012. It was followed by Two Men in Town, with Forest Whitaker, Harvey Keitel and Luis Guzmán.

The now-third project was then renamed Le Cop de Belleville for France. The main roles were then taken over in 2017 by Omar Sy and Luis Guzmán.

For the writing of the screenplay, Bouchareb cited Beverly Hills Cop and also buddy movies like 48 Hrs., Lethal Weapon and L'emmerdeur. He collaborated with one of the 48 Hrs. writers, Larry Gross.

=== Shooting ===
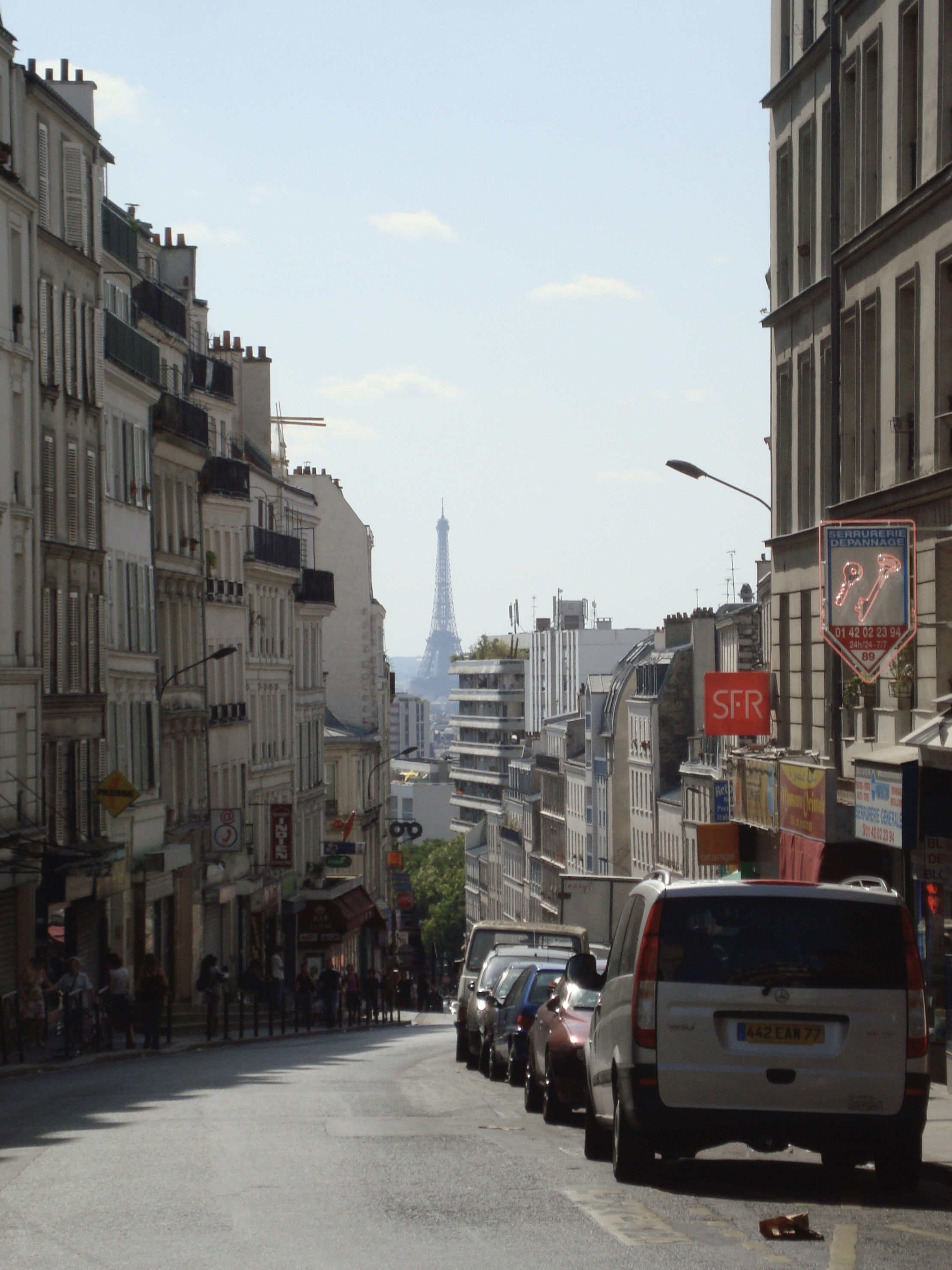
Rue de Belleville

The filming began in March 2017 in Paris, in the 20th arrondissement. It later continued in Miami and Los Angeles, as well as Riohacha, La Guajira, Colombia.

== Exhibition and box office ==
The film was released on 17 October 2018 on 550 screens. It only sold 30,220 tickets for its debut day despite a big promotional campaign and having Omar Sy as a leading actor. For the first week, only 248,868 tickets were sold. It finished its theatrical run with 630,283 tickets sold. It brought in only $7M against a budget of $17M. After Knock, it was another commercial failure for Omar Sy.

== Reception ==
On the French site Allociné, which lists 7 titles of press, the film obtained the average score of 2.0/5.

In Current Woman, Amélie Cordonnier describes the film "a nice detective comedy". In Le Parisien, Catherine Balle writes "the new feature film by Rachid Bouchareb, a comedy, is hard not to smile to and one gets lost in a fantastic scenario". For First, Pierre Lunn writes: "The new film by Rachid Bouchareb with Omar Sy is struggling to bring into existence the idea of a buddy cop movie in the French." Hélène Marzolf of Télérama wonders "what has happened to Rachid Bouchareb to make a film that" Americans would experience as "outrageous and not funny".

== Soundtrack ==
Movie has 30 songs in its soundtrack album, some of which with folk note.
