= Sisters in Arms (2019 film) =

2019 French war-drama film

- Directed by: Caroline Fourest
- Written by: Caroline Fourest
- Produced by: Jad Ben Ammar; Samuel Hadida; Leo Maidenberg
- Starring: Dilan Gwyn; Amira Casar; Camélia Jordana; Esther Garrel
- Music by: Mathieu Lamboley
- Production company: Davis Films
- Release date: 2019
- Running time: 112 minutes
- Countries: France, Belgium
- Language: English
- Budget: € 5.6 million

Sisters in Arms (French: Sœurs d'armes) is a French war-drama film based on historic events related to the Genocide of Yazidis by the Islamic State, written and directed by Caroline Fourest. The film was released in October 2019.

== Plot ==
Kenza and Yaël are two young French women who go to Syria and join the 'Snake brigade', an international battalion of women fighting the ISIS alongside the Kurdish forces. There they meet Zara, a Yazidi survivor. Born in different cultures but deeply united, the women fighters heal their past wounds and discover their present strength, especially the fear they inspire in their opponents. The three young women soon bound together and become true sisters-in-arms.

== Cast ==
- Dilan Gwyn as Zara
- Amira Casar as Commander
- Camélia Jordana as Kenza
- Esther Garrel as Yaël
- Maya Sansa as Mother Sun
- Nanna Blondell as Snipe
- Pascal Greggory as Agent de la coalition
- Noush Skaugen as Lady Kurda
- Mark Ryder as Al Britani
- Korkmaz Arslan as Commander
- Youssef Douazou as El Tounsi

== Production ==
Sisters in Arms was written and directed by Caroline Fourest, with a budget of €5.6 million. The project was announced in January 2018 under the title Red Snake.

== See also ==
Genocide of Yazidis by the Islamic State
