= Sweat (2002 film) =

- Directed by: Louis-Pascal Couvelaire
- Written by: Michael Cooper; Louis-Pascal Couvelaire; Benoît Philippon
- Produced by: Samuel Hadida
- Starring: Jean-Hugues Anglade; Joaquim de Almeida
- Cinematography: Michel Abramowicz
- Edited by: Sylvie Landra
- Music by: Pascal Lafa
- Production company: Davis Films
- Distributed by: Metropolitan Filmexport
- Release date: 24 July 2002
- Running time: 103 min
- Country: France
- Language: French

Sweat (French: Sueurs) is a 2002 French action film directed by Louis-Pascal Couvelaire.

== Cast ==
- Jean-Hugues Anglade - Harvey
- Joaquim de Almeida - Noh
- Cyrille Thouvenin - Victor
- Sagamore Stévenin - Simon
- Nozha Khouadra - Farah
