= The Scent of Mandarin =

- Theatrical release poster
- French: L'Odeur de la mandarine
- Directed by: Gilles Legrand
- Written by: Guillaume Laurant
- Produced by: Frédéric Brillion; Victor Hadida
- Starring: Olivier Gourmet; Georgia Scalliet
- Cinematography: Yves Angelo
- Edited by: Andrea Sedláčková
- Music by: Armand Amar
- Production companies: Epithète Films; Davis Films; France 3 Cinéma
- Distributed by: Metropolitan Filmexport
- Release dates: 27 August 2015 (Angoulême); 30 September 2015 (France)
- Running time: 110 minutes
- Country: France
- Language: French
- Budget: $8.2 million
- Box office: $940.000

The Scent of Mandarin (French: L'Odeur de la mandarine) is a 2015 French drama film directed by Gilles Legrand. It stars Olivier Gourmet and Georgia Scalliet. It was nominated for two César Awards at the 41st César Awards.

== Cast ==
- Olivier Gourmet as Charles
- Georgia Scalliet as Angèle
- Dimitri Storoge as Léonard
- Hélène Vincent as Émilie
- Marine Vallée as Louise
- Fred Ulysse as Firmin
- Romain Bouteille as the notary
- Michel Robin as the priest
- Alix Bénézech as Louison
- Urbain Cancelier as Sergeant

== Accolades ==
Award / Film Festival	Category	Recipients and nominees	Result
César Awards	Best Costume Design	Catherine Leterrier	Nominated
César Awards	Best Production Design	Jean Rabasse	Nominated
