= List of Universal Pictures films (2000–2009) =

This is a list of films produced and/or distributed by Universal Pictures (founded in 1912 as the Universal Film Manufacturing Company) from 2000 to 2009. It is the main motion picture production and distribution arm of Universal Studios, a subsidiary of the NBCUniversal division of Comcast.

== 2000 ==
Release date	Title	Notes
January 28, 2000	Isn't She Great	North American, U.K. and Irish distribution only; produced by Mutual Film Company and Lobell-Bergman Productions
February 18, 2000	Pitch Black	distribution outside the U.S. theatrically only; produced by PolyGram Filmed Entertainment and Interscope Communications; rights licensed to Sandrew Metronome for Scandinavia, A&P Filmcilik for Turkey, GAGA-Humax for Japan and Shaw Entertainment for Singapore; distributed theatrically in the U.S. by USA Films
March 3, 2000	Agnes Browne	distribution in Canada, Latin America, the U.K., Ireland, Australia, New Zealand, Italy, the Benelux and Scandinavia only; produced by October Films
March 17, 2000	Erin Brockovich	Nominated for the Academy Award for Best Picture; Nominated for the Golden Globe Award for Best Motion Picture – Drama; North American distribution only; produced by Columbia Pictures and Jersey Films
March 24, 2000	Waking the Dead	Canadian and international distribution only; produced by Egg Pictures; rights licensed to Lolistar for France; distributed in the U.S. by USA Films
March 31, 2000	The Skulls (Note: Owned by AMBI Group and Raven Capital Management, with U.S. distribution rights currently licensed to Samuel Goldwyn Films)	distribution in North America, the U.K., Ireland, Japan and Indonesia only; produced by Original Film and Newmarket Capital Group
April 14, 2000	Up at the Villa (Note: Distribution rights co-owned by Resurgence Media Group)	distribution in Latin America, the U.K., Ireland, France, Germany, Austria and Spain only; produced by October Films, Intermedia Films and Mirage Enterprises; distributed in the U.S. by USA Films
April 21, 2000	U-571 (Note: International rights have since reverted to producer StudioCanal)	distribution in North and Latin America, Italy, India, Indonesia, Malaysia and Singapore only; produced by Canal+ Image and Dino De Laurentiis Company
April 28, 2000	The Flintstones in Viva Rock Vegas	co-production with Hanna-Barbera Productions and Amblin Entertainment
May 5, 2000	Gladiator	Winner of the Academy Award for Best Picture; Winner of the Golden Globe Award for Best Motion Picture – Drama international distribution outside Korea only; co-production with DreamWorks Pictures, Red Wagon Entertainment and Scott Free Productions
May 12, 2000	Screwed	co-production with Robert Simonds Productions and Brillstein-Grey Entertainment
June 30, 2000	The Adventures of Rocky and Bullwinkle	co-production with Capella International, KC Medien, Tribeca Productions and Jay Ward Productions; rights licensed to Momentum Pictures for the U.K. and Ireland, Sandrew Metronome for Scandinavia, Universe Entertainment for Hong Kong, Avsar Film for Turkey and West Film for the CIS
July 21, 2000	Mad About Mambo	Canadian and international distribution only; produced by Phoenix Pictures, First City Features and Plurabelle Films; rights licensed to Sandrew Metronome for Scandinavia and GAGA-Humax for Japan; distributed in the U.S. by USA Films
July 28, 2000	Nutty Professor II: The Klumps	co-production with Imagine Entertainment
July 28, 2000	Wonderland	distribution outside the U.S. theatrically only; produced by Revolution Films and Kismet Film Company; rights licensed to Sandrew Metronome for Scandinavia and Asmik Ace for Japan distributed in the U.S. by USA Films (Note: Released in UK theaters on January 14, 2000.)
August 25, 2000	Bring It On	North American distribution only; produced by Beacon Pictures
September 8, 2000	The Watcher	North American, U.K., Irish, Australian and New Zealand distribution only; produced by Interlight
September 8, 2000	Nurse Betty	distribution in Canada, Latin America, Australia, New Zealand, Italy and Japan only; produced by Pacifica Film Distribution, Propaganda Films and ab'-strakt pictures; distributed in the U.S. by USA Films
October 6, 2000	Meet the Parents	North American distribution only; co-production with DreamWorks Pictures, Nancy Tenenbaum Films and Tribeca Productions
October 6, 2000	Rat	Canadian and international distribution only; produced by The Jim Henson Company; rights licensed to Monolith Films for Poland, InterCom for Hungary and West Film for the CIS; distributed in the U.S. by Universal Focus
October 13, 2000	Billy Elliot	Canadian and international distribution outside France only; produced by StudioCanal, BBC Films, Working Title Films, Tiger Aspect Pictures and WT2 Productions; rights licensed to West Film for the CIS and Nippon Herald Films for Japan; distributed in the U.S. by Universal Focus (Note: Released in UK theaters on September 29, 2000.)
November 17, 2000	How the Grinch Stole Christmas	co-production with Imagine Entertainment
December 8, 2000	The Man Who Cried	distribution in the U.S. on home media and television, Canada, the U.K., Ireland, Australia, New Zealand, South Africa and the Benelux only; produced by StudioCanal, Working Title Films and Adventure Pictures; distributed in the U.S. by Universal Focus
December 22, 2000	O Brother, Where Art Thou? (Note: Released in international theaters on September 15, 2000.)	Nominated for the Golden Globe Award for Best Motion Picture – Musical or Comedy international distribution outside France only; co-production with Touchstone Pictures, StudioCanal and Working Title Films; rights licensed to Momentum Pictures for the U.K. and Ireland, Egmont Entertainment for Scandinavia, Lusomundo for Portugal, ITI Cinema for Poland, Prooptiki for Greece and Cyprus and GAGA-Humax for Japan distributed in North America by Buena Vista Pictures
December 22, 2000	The Family Man	North American distribution only; produced by Beacon Pictures and Saturn Films

== 2001 ==
Release date	Title	Notes
February 2, 2001	Head over Heels	co-production with Robert Simonds Productions
February 9, 2001	Hannibal (Note: Universal has since reclaimed German, Austrian, Italian and Japanese distribution rights to this film)	international distribution outside Germany, Austria, Italy and Japan only; co-production with Metro-Goldwyn-Mayer, Dino De Laurentiis Company and Scott Free Productions; rights licensed to Monolith Films for Poland, InterCom for Hungary and Pyramid Films for the CIS, distributed in North America by MGM Distribution Co.
April 6, 2001 (Note: Released in UK theaters on January 19, 2001.)	Beautiful Creatures	distribution outside the U.S. theatrically only; produced by DNA Films; distributed in the U.S. by Universal Focus
April 11, 2001	Josie and the Pussycats	North American distribution only; co-production with Metro-Goldwyn-Mayer, Marc Platt Productions and Riverdale Productions
April 12, 2001	Crocodile Dundee in Los Angeles	U.K., Irish, Australian, New Zealand and Scandinavian distribution only; produced by Silver Lion Films and Bungalow Films; distributed in North America by Paramount Pictures
April 13, 2001	Bridget Jones's Diary	international distribution outside France only; co-production with StudioCanal, Miramax Films and Working Title Films
May 4, 2001	The Mummy Returns	distribution only; produced by Alphaville Films
May 4, 2001	Pavilion of Women	distribution outside the U.S. theatrically, China and Hong Kong only; produced by Beijing Film Studio; distributed in the U.S. by Universal Focus
June 22, 2001	The Fast and the Furious	co-production with Original Film
June 29, 2001 (Note: Released in international theaters on November 9, 2001.)	Strictly Sinatra	distribution outside the U.S. theatrically only; produced by DNA Films; distributed in the U.S. by Universal Focus
July 18, 2001	Jurassic Park III	co-production with Amblin Entertainment
August 10, 2001	American Pie 2	co-production with Zide/Perry Productions and LivePlanet
August 10, 2001	The Parole Officer	international distribution only; produced by DNA Films; premiered in the U.S. on Sundance Channel
August 17, 2001	Captain Corelli's Mandolin	distribution outside the U.K., Ireland, France, Australia, New Zealand, Japan and the CIS only; co-acquisition with Miramax Films; produced by StudioCanal and Working Title Films; rights licensed to Pinema for Turkey, Odeon for Greece and Cyprus, ITI Cinema for Poland and Lusomundo for Portugal
September 7, 2001	The Musketeer	North American distribution only; co-acquisition with Miramax Films; produced by MDP Worldwide, Crystal Sky Worldwide, D'Artagnan Productions, Ltd., Apollomedia, Q&Q Media and Carousell Picture Company
October 12, 2001	Mulholland Drive (Note: Although a Blu-ray of Mulholland Drive from The Criterion Collection released in 2015 lists both Universal and its division Focus Features as licensees, U.S. distribution rights have been acquired by Criterion and its parent Janus Films since.)	U.S. distribution, U.K., Irish and Italian home media distribution only; produced by StudioCanal, Les Films Alain Sarde, Asymmetrical Productions, Babbo Inc. and The Picture Factory
October 26, 2001	K-PAX (Note: Distribution rights co-owned by Resurgence Media Group; in 2025, Resurgence licensed rights to the film in most international countries, including Universal's share of foreign territories, to Sony Pictures)	distribution in North and Latin America, France, Dutch home media and Asia excluding Japan and Korea only; co-production with Intermedia Films and Lawrence Gordon Productions
November 21, 2001	Spy Game	distribution in North America, Australia, New Zealand, Germany, Austria, Switzerland, the Benelux, Greece, Cyprus, Eastern Europe, the CIS, India and Korea only; produced by Beacon Pictures and Red Wagon Entertainment
December 21, 2001	A Beautiful Mind	winner of the Academy Award for Best Picture; North American distribution only; co-production with DreamWorks Pictures and Imagine Entertainment
December 21, 2001	How High	co-production with Jersey Films and Native Pictures

== 2002 ==
Release date	Title	Notes
January 11, 2002	Brotherhood of the Wolf (Note: This film was subsequently transferred to Universal's Focus Features division, with a "director's cut" DVD edition released under the label in 2008. StudioCanal now retains all rights to the film, with it since being re-issued on Blu-ray in the U.S. by Scream Factory.)	U.S., Australian and New Zealand theatrical U.K., Irish and Italian home media distribution only; produced by StudioCanal and Davis Films
January 18, 2002	Long Time Dead	Canadian and international distribution outside France only; produced by StudioCanal, Working Title Films, UK Film Council, WT2 Productions and Midfield Films; received a direct-to-video release in the U.S. by Focus Features
February 8, 2002	Big Fat Liar	co-production with Tollin/Robbins Productions
February 22, 2002	Dragonfly	North American distribution only; co-production with Spyglass Entertainment, Gran Via Productions and Shady Acres Entertainment
March 1, 2002	40 Days and 40 Nights	international distribution only; co-production with StudioCanal, Miramax Films and Working Title Films
March 15, 2002	Harrison's Flowers (Note: StudioCanal retains all rights to this film, with U.S. theatrical and home video distribution rights currently licensed to Kino Lorber.)	U.S. theatrical and home media distribution only; produced by StudioCanal
April 19, 2002	The Scorpion King	co-production with WWF Entertainment, Alphaville Films and Misher Films
April 19, 2002	Charlotte Gray	distribution in France, the Benelux, Switzerland, Scandinavia, Spain, Italy, Australia, New Zealand and Japan only; produced by FilmFour, Senator Film and Ecosse Films; distributed in North America by Warner Bros. Pictures
May 17, 2002	About a Boy	distribution outside France only; produced by StudioCanal, Tribeca Productions and Working Title Films
May 31, 2002	Undercover Brother	distribution outside Japan only; produced by Imagine Entertainment
June 14, 2002	The Bourne Identity	co-production with the Kennedy/Marshall Company and Hypnotic Productions
August 16, 2002	Blue Crush	co-production with Imagine Entertainment; rights licensed to Momentum Pictures for the U.K. and Ireland and GAGA-Humax for Japan
September 5, 2002	Ali G Indahouse	distribution outside France only; produced by StudioCanal, Working Title Films, Baby Cow Productions, WT2 Productions and TalkBack Productions
September 20, 2002 (Note: Released in international theaters on January 4, 2002.)	D-Tox	international distribution only; co-production with KC Medien and Capella International; distributed in North America by DEJ Productions under the title Eye See You
October 4, 2002	Red Dragon	co-production with Dino De Laurentiis Company and Metro-Goldwyn-Mayer
October 25, 2002	The Truth About Charlie	distribution only; produced by Clinica Estetico Productions and Mediastrem Film
November 8, 2002	8 Mile	co-production with Imagine Entertainment
November 22, 2002	The Emperor's Club	distribution in North America, Germany, Austria, Switzerland, the Benelux, Greece, Cyprus, Eastern Europe, the CIS, India and Korea only; produced by Beacon Pictures, Sidney Kimmel Entertainment, Longfellow Pictures and LivePlanet
December 6, 2002	Empire	co-acquisition with Arenas Entertainment

== 2003 ==
Release date	Title	Notes
January 31, 2003 (Note: Released in international theaters on August 23, 2002.)	The Guru	distribution only; produced by StudioCanal and Working Title Films
February 21, 2003	The Life of David Gale	distribution outside Scandinavia, Portugal, Turkey, Switzerland, Greece, Cyprus, Eastern Europe and the CIS only; co-production with Intermedia Films, Saturn Films and Dirty Hands Productions
May 23, 2003	Bruce Almighty	North American distribution only; co-production with Spyglass Entertainment, Shady Acres Entertainment and Pit Bull Productions
June 6, 2003	2 Fast 2 Furious	co-production with Original Film
June 20, 2003	Hulk	co-production with Marvel Enterprises, Valhalla Motion Pictures and Good Machine
July 18, 2003	Johnny English	distribution outside France only; produced by StudioCanal and Working Title Films
July 25, 2003	Seabiscuit	Nominated for the Academy Award for Best Picture; Nominated for the Golden Globe Award for Best Motion Picture – Drama; North American distribution only; co-production with DreamWorks Pictures, Spyglass Entertainment, Larger Than Life Productions and The Kennedy/Marshall Company
August 1, 2003	American Wedding	co-production with Zide/Perry Productions and LivePlanet
September 26, 2003	The Rundown	North American and Japanese distribution only; co-production with Columbia Pictures, WWE Films, Misher Films and Strike Entertainment
October 10, 2003	Intolerable Cruelty	co-production with Imagine Entertainment, Alphaville and Mike Zoss Productions; rights licensed to Paradise Group for the CIS and Pioneer Films for the Philippines
November 7, 2003	Love Actually	Nominated for the Golden Globe Award for Best Motion Picture – Musical or Comedy distribution outside France only; produced by StudioCanal, Working Title Films and DNA Films; rights licensed to Central Partnership for the CIS, ACME Film for the Baltics, Discovery Film & Video Distribution for former Yugoslavia, Pioneer Films for the Philippines, Pacific Entertainment for Thailand and Bir Film for Turkey theatrically
November 14, 2003	Master and Commander: The Far Side of the World	Nominated for the Academy Award for Best Picture; Nominated for the Golden Globe Award for Best Motion Picture – Drama distribution in Latin America, France and Japanese home media only; co-production with 20th Century Fox, Miramax Films and Samuel Goldwyn Films
November 21, 2003	The Cat in the Hat	North American distribution only; co-production with DreamWorks Pictures and Imagine Entertainment
December 5, 2003	Honey	distribution only; produced by Marc Platt Productions and NuAmerica Entertainment; rights licensed to Eagle Pictures for Italy, Paradise Group for the CIS and Pioneer Films for the Philippines
December 25, 2003 (Note: Released in Australian theaters on December 18, 2003.)	Peter Pan	distribution in North America excluding free and pay television, the U.K., Ireland, Australia, New Zealand and South Africa only; co-acquisition with Columbia Pictures; produced by Revolution Studios, Red Wagon Entertainment and Allied Stars

== 2004 ==
Release date	Title	Notes
January 16, 2004	Along Came Polly	co-production with Jersey Films
March 19, 2004	Dawn of the Dead	distribution outside the U.K., Ireland, France, the Nordics, South Africa, the Middle East, Israel, Turkey and Japan only; produced by Strike Entertainment and New Amsterdam Entertainment
March 26, 2004	Ned Kelly	Canadian and international distribution outside France only; produced by StudioCanal, Working Title Films and Endymion Films; rights licensed to Central Partnership for the CIS, Pioneer Films for the Philippines and ACME Film for the Baltics; distributed in the U.S. by Focus Features (Note: Released in Australian theaters on March 27, 2003.)
April 16, 2004	Connie and Carla (Note: Universal has since reclaimed distribution rights in Australia, New Zealand, Germany, Austria, Switzerland, Italy, the Benelux, former Yugoslavia and Turkey to this film) (Note: Co-owned by Content Partners LLC)	distribution in North and Latin America, the U.K., Ireland, France, Spain, the Middle East and Asia only; produced by Spyglass Entertainment
April 27, 2004	My Little Eye	international distribution outside France only; produced by StudioCanal, Working Title Films and WT2 Productions; rights licensed to Momentum Pictures for the U.K. and Ireland, distributed in North America by Focus Features (Note: Released in international theaters on October 4, 2002.)
April 30, 2004	The Calcium Kid	international distribution outside France only; co-production with StudioCanal, Working Title Films and WT2 Productions; premiered in the U.S. on Comedy Central
May 7, 2004	Van Helsing (Note: Universal has since reclaimed Russian distribution rights to this film)	co-production with the Sommers Company and Stillking Films; rights licensed to GAGA-Humax for Japan theatrically, Tube Entertainment and Montage Entertainment for Korea, Pioneer Films for the Philippines, Central Partnership for the CIS and ACME Film for the Baltics
June 11, 2004	The Chronicles of Riddick	co-production with Radar Pictures and One Race Films; rights licensed to Shochiku and Toshiba Entertainment for Japan, CJ Entertainment for Korea, Pioneer Films for the Philippines and Paradise Group for the CIS
June 25, 2004	Two Brothers	distribution outside the U.K., Ireland, France, Spain, the Benelux, Germany, Austria, Switzerland, Italy and Japan only; produced by Pathé, TF1 Films Production and Allied Filmmakers; rights licensed
July 23, 2004	The Bourne Supremacy	distribution outside Japan only; produced by the Kennedy/Marshall Company and Ludlum Entertainment
July 30, 2004	Thunderbirds	distribution outside France only; produced by StudioCanal and Working Title Films; rights licensed to Paradise Group for the CIS and Pioneer Films for the Philippines
September 17, 2004	Wimbledon	distribution outside France only; produced by StudioCanal and Working Title Films; rights licensed to Paradise Group for the CIS and Pioneer Films for the Philippines
September 24, 2004	Shaun of the Dead	international distribution outside France only; produced by StudioCanal, Working Title Films, WT2 Productions and Big Talk Productions; theatrical rights licensed to Premium Cine for Spain; distributed in North America by Rogue Pictures (Note: Released in international theaters on April 9, 2004.)
October 8, 2004	Friday Night Lights	co-production with Imagine Entertainment
October 29, 2004	Ray	Nominated for the Academy Award for Best Picture; Nominated for the Golden Globe Award for Best Motion Picture – Musical or Comedy distribution only; produced by Bristol Bay Productions, Anvil Films and Baldwin Entertainment Group
November 19, 2004	Bridget Jones: The Edge of Reason	distribution outside France only; produced by Miramax Films, StudioCanal and Working Title Films
December 22, 2004	Meet the Fockers	North American distribution only; co-production with DreamWorks Pictures, Tribeca Productions and Everyman Pictures
December 29, 2004	In Good Company	North American, French and Japanese home media distribution only; co-production with Depth of Field

== 2005 ==
Release date	Title	Notes
January 7, 2005	White Noise	distribution in the U.S., Latin America, Australia, New Zealand, France, Germany, Austria, Italy, Scandinavia and Korea only; produced by Gold Circle Films, White Noise UK Limited, Brightlight Pictures, Endgame Entertainment, CHUM Television and The Movie Network
February 4, 2005	The Wedding Date	U.S., Latin American and Korean distribution only; produced by Gold Circle Films, 26 Films and VisionView, Ltd.
February 4, 2005	Inside I'm Dancing	international distribution outside France only; produced by StudioCanal, Working Title Films, Irish Film Board, WT2 Productions and Octagon Productions; rights licensed to Momentum Pictures for the U.K. and Ireland; distributed in North America by Focus Features (Note: Released in international theaters on October 15, 2004.)
February 11, 2005	Inside Deep Throat	North American distribution only; produced by Imagine Entertainment, HBO Documentary Films and World of Wonder
March 25, 2005	Mickybo and Me	international distribution outside France only; produced by StudioCanal, Working Title Films, Irish Film Board, Northern Ireland Film and Television Commission, WT2 Productions and New Moon Pictures; premiered in the U.S. on Sundance Channel
April 22, 2005	The Interpreter	distribution only; produced by Working Title Films, Misher Films and Mirage Enterprises; rights licensed to StudioCanal for France and Eagle Pictures for Italy
May 13, 2005	Kicking & Screaming	co-production with Mosaic Media Group
June 3, 2005	Cinderella Man	North American distribution only; co-production with Miramax Films, Imagine Entertainment and Parkway Productions
June 17, 2005	The Perfect Man	co-production with Marc Platt Productions
June 24, 2005	Land of the Dead	distribution outside France, the Benelux and Switzerland only; produced by Atmosphere Entertainment MM, Romero-Grunwald Productions, Wild Bunch and Rangerkim
August 12, 2005	The Skeleton Key	co-production with Shadowcatcher Entertainment and Double Feature Films
August 19, 2005	The 40-Year-Old Virgin	co-production with Apatow Productions
September 30, 2005	Serenity	co-production with Barry Mendel Productions
October 7, 2005	Two for the Money (Note: Owned by Morgan Creek Entertainment, with international distribution rights licensed to Revolution Studios and home media, television and streaming rights licensed to Sony Pictures, with select distribution rights also sub-licensed to Shout! Studios)	distribution in North and Latin America, the U.K., Ireland, Australia, New Zealand, South Africa, Germany, Austria, Switzerland, Italy, Spain, Andorra and Asia only; produced by Morgan Creek Productions
October 21, 2005	Doom	co-production with John Wells Productions and Di Bonaventura Pictures
October 28, 2005	Prime	North American distribution only; produced by Stratus Film Company, Team Todd and Younger Than You
November 4, 2005	Jarhead	co-production with Red Wagon Entertainment and Neal Street Productions
November 11, 2005	Pride and Prejudice	Canadian and international distribution outside France only; produced by StudioCanal, Scion Films and Working Title Films; distributed in the U.S. by Focus Features (Note: Released in international theaters on September 16, 2005.)
December 2, 2005	First Descent	U.S. distribution only; produced by MD Films, Transition Productions, Embassy Row, LivePlanet and Dave-Brown Entertainment
December 14, 2005	King Kong	co-production with WingNut Films
December 23, 2005	Munich	North American distribution only; co-production with DreamWorks Pictures, Amblin Entertainment, The Kennedy/Marshall Company, Barry Mendel Productions and Alliance Atlantis
December 25, 2005	The Producers	North American distribution only; co-production with Columbia Pictures and Brooksfilms

== 2006 ==
Release date	Title	Notes
January 27, 2006	Nanny McPhee	distribution outside France only; produced by StudioCanal, Metro-Goldwyn-Mayer, Working Title Films and Three Strange Angels; rights licensed to Eagle Pictures for Italy
February 10, 2006	Curious George	co-production with Imagine Entertainment and Universal Animation Studios
March 24, 2006	Inside Man	co-production with Imagine Entertainment and 40 Acres and a Mule Filmworks
March 31, 2006	Slither	distribution in the U.S., Latin America, Australia, New Zealand, France, Germany, Austria, Switzerland, Italy, Spain, Andorra and South Africa only; produced by Gold Circle Films and Strike Entertainment
April 21, 2006	American Dreamz	co-production with Depth of Field
April 28, 2006	United 93	distribution outside France only; produced by StudioCanal, Sidney Kimmel Entertainment and Working Title Films
June 2, 2006	The Break-Up	co-production with Wild West Picture Show Productions
June 16, 2006	The Fast and the Furious: Tokyo Drift	co-production with Relativity Media and Original Film
July 14, 2006	You, Me and Dupree	co-production with Avis-Davis Productions and Stuber-Parent Productions
July 28, 2006	Miami Vice	co-production with Forward Pass and Metropolis Films
August 11, 2006	Step Up	U.K., Irish, French, Swiss, Australian and New Zealand distribution only; produced by Summit Entertainment and Offspring Entertainment; distributed in North America by Touchstone Pictures through Buena Vista Pictures Distribution
August 18, 2006	Accepted	co-production with Shady Acres Entertainment
August 25, 2006	Idlewild	distribution outside U.S. pay television only; produced by HBO Films, Atlas Entertainment, Mosaic Media Group and Forensic Films
September 15, 2006	The Black Dahlia	North American distribution only; produced by Millennium Films, Signature Pictures, Davis Films, Equity Pictures and Nu Image Entertainment
October 13, 2006	Man of the Year	distribution in North and Latin America, U.K. and Irish home media, France, Germany, Austria, Switzerland, Spain, Andorra, Scandinavia and Asia only; produced by Morgan Creek Productions
October 27, 2006	Catch a Fire	international distribution outside France only; produced by StudioCanal, Working Title Films and Mirage Enterprises; distributed in North America by Focus Features
November 17, 2006	Let's Go to Prison	distribution only; produced by Carsey Werner Films and Strike Entertainment
December 8, 2006	The Holiday	international distribution only; co-production with Columbia Pictures, Relativity Media and Waverly Films; distributed in North America by Sony Pictures Releasing
December 22, 2006	The Good Shepherd (Note: Co-owned by Morgan Creek Entertainment, with international distribution rights licensed to Revolution Studios, which has sub-licensed television and streaming rights to Sony Pictures)	distribution in North and Latin America, the U.K., Ireland, Australian and New Zealand home media, Germany, Austria, Spain, Andorra and Asia excluding Indonesia and Taiwan only; produced by Morgan Creek Productions, Tribeca Productions and American Zoetrope
December 25, 2006	Children of Men	distribution outside the Nordics, South Africa, the Middle East, Israel, Turkey and Japan only; co-production with Strike Entertainment and Hit and Run Productions

== 2007 ==
Release date	Title	Notes
January 12, 2007	Alpha Dog	North American distribution only; produced by Sidney Kimmel Entertainment and A-Mark Entertainment
January 26, 2007	Smokin' Aces	distribution outside France only; produced by StudioCanal, Relativity Media and Working Title Films
February 2, 2007	Because I Said So	U.S. distribution only; produced by Gold Circle Films
February 16, 2007	Breach	North American distribution only; co-production with Sidney Kimmel Entertainment, Outlaw Productions and Intermedia Films
March 16, 2007	Dead Silence	co-production with Twisted Pictures
April 20, 2007	Hot Fuzz	international distribution outside France only; produced by StudioCanal, Working Title Films and Big Talk Productions; distributed in North America by Rogue Pictures (Note: Released in UK theaters on February 16, 2007.)
May 11, 2007	Georgia Rule	distribution in North and Hispanic America, the U.K., Ireland, Australian and New Zealand home media, France, Germany, Austria, Switzerland, Italy, Spain, Andorra and Asia only; produced by Morgan Creek Productions
June 1, 2007	Knocked Up	co-production with Apatow Productions
June 22, 2007	Evan Almighty	co-production with Spyglass Entertainment, Relativity Media, Shady Acres Entertainment and Original Film
July 20, 2007	I Now Pronounce You Chuck & Larry	co-production with Relativity Media, Happy Madison Productions and Shady Acres Entertainment
August 3, 2007	The Bourne Ultimatum	co-production with The Kennedy/Marshall Company and Ludlum Entertainment
August 24, 2007	Mr. Bean's Holiday	distribution outside France only; produced by StudioCanal, Working Title Films and Tiger Aspect
August 24, 2007	Illegal Tender	distribution only; produced by New Deal Entertainment
September 21, 2007	Sydney White	distribution in North and Hispanic America, the U.K., Ireland, France, Spain, Andorra, Italy, Australian and New Zealand home media and Asia only; produced by Morgan Creek Productions
September 28, 2007	The Kingdom	co-production with Relativity Media, Forward Pass and Stuber-Parent Productions
October 12, 2007	Elizabeth: The Golden Age	distribution outside France only; produced by StudioCanal and Working Title Films
November 2, 2007	American Gangster	co-production with Imagine Entertainment, Relativity Media and Scott Free Productions
November 14, 2007	Southland Tales	distribution in Latin America, the U.K., Ireland, Australia, New Zealand, South Africa, Germany, Austria, Italy, Scandinavia and Japan only; produced by Wild Bunch, Darko Entertainment, Persistent Entertainment, Cherry Road Films and Inferno Distribution; distributed in the U.S. by Samuel Goldwyn Films and Destination Films
November 27, 2007	Whisper	U.S. distribution only; produced by Gold Circle Films, H2F Entertainment and Deacon Entertainment
December 7, 2007	Atonement	international distribution outside France only; produced by StudioCanal, Relativity Media and Working Title Films; distributed in North America by Focus Features (Note: Released in international theaters on September 7, 2007.)
December 21, 2007	Charlie Wilson's War	co-production with Relativity Media, Participant Productions and Playtone

== 2008 ==
Release date	Title	Notes
January 11, 2008	The Pirates Who Don't Do Anything: A VeggieTales Movie	distribution only; produced by Big Idea Productions, Starz Animation and Entertainment Rights Group
February 8, 2008	Welcome Home, Roscoe Jenkins	co-production with Spyglass Entertainment and Stuber-Parent Productions
February 14, 2008	Definitely, Maybe	distribution outside France only; produced by StudioCanal and Working Title Films
February 14, 2008	Step Up 2: The Streets	U.K., Irish, Australian, New Zealand, Swiss and French distribution only; produced by Touchstone Pictures, Summit Entertainment and Offspring Entertainment; distributed in North America by Walt Disney Studios Motion Pictures
February 29, 2008	Untraceable	distribution in the U.K., Ireland, France, Germany, Austria, Switzerland, Spain, Androra, Australia, New Zealand and South Africa only; produced by Lakeshore Entertainment; distributed in North and Latin America and Japan by Screen Gems through Sony Pictures Releasing
March 6, 2008	The Other Boleyn Girl	distribution in the U.K., Ireland, Australia, New Zealand, Germany, Austria, Switzerland, Italy, Spain, Andorra, the Benelux, the CIS and Korea only; produced by Focus Features, BBC Films, Relativity Media, Ruby Films and Scott Rudin Productions; distributed in North America by Columbia Pictures through Sony Pictures Releasing
March 14, 2008	Doomsday	distribution in the U.S., Latin America, the U.K., Ireland, Australia, New Zealand, Spain and Andorra only; produced by Rogue Pictures, Intrepid Pictures, Crystal Sky Pictures and Scion Films
April 4, 2008	Leatherheads	co-production with Smokehouse Pictures and Casey Silver Productions
April 4, 2008	Nim's Island	distribution in Latin America, the U.K., Ireland, Germany, Austria, Spain, Andorra, Australia and New Zealand only; produced by Walden Media; distributed in North America by 20th Century Fox
April 18, 2008	Forgetting Sarah Marshall	co-production with Apatow Productions
April 25, 2008	Baby Mama	co-production with Relativity Media and Michaels-Goldwyn Productions
May 30, 2008	The Strangers	distribution in the U.S., the U.K., Ireland, Australia, New Zealand, Italy, Spain and Andorra only; produced by Rogue Pictures, Intrepid Pictures, Vertigo Entertainment and Mandate Pictures
June 13, 2008	The Incredible Hulk (Note: Owned by Disney (via Marvel Studios))	distribution outside Australia, New Zealand, France, Germany, Austria, Spain, Andorra and Japan only; produced by Marvel Studios and Valhalla Motion Pictures
June 27, 2008	Wanted	co-production with Spyglass Entertainment, Relativity Media, Marc Platt Productions, Kickstart Productions and Top Cow Productions
July 11, 2008	Hellboy II: The Golden Army	co-production with Relativity Media, Lawrence Gordon Productions, Lloyd Levin Productions and Dark Horse Entertainment
July 18, 2008	Mamma Mia!: The Movie	co-production with Relativity Media, Playtone and Littlestar Productions
August 1, 2008	The Mummy: Tomb of the Dragon Emperor	co-production with Relativity Media, The Sommers Company and Alphaville
August 1, 2008	Sixty Six	international distribution outside France only; produced by StudioCanal and Working Title Films; distributed in the U.S. by First Independent Pictures (Note: Released in international theaters on November 3, 2006.)
August 22, 2008	Death Race	co-production with Relativity Media, Impact Pictures and Cruise/Wagner Productions
October 3, 2008	Flash of Genius	distribution outside the U.K., Ireland, Australia, New Zealand, Greece, Cyprus, Germany, Austria, the Nordics, Portugal, Angola, Mozambique, Poland and Israel only; produced by Spyglass Entertainment and Strike Entertainment
October 10, 2008	The Express: The Ernie Davis Story	co-production with Relativity Media and Davis Entertainment
October 24, 2008	Changeling	co-production with Imagine Entertainment, Relativity Media and Malpaso Productions
November 7, 2008	Role Models	co-production with Relativity Media and Stuber-Parent Productions
December 5, 2008	Frost/Nixon	Nominated for the Academy Award for Best Picture; Nominated for the Golden Globe Award for Best Motion Picture – Drama distribution outside France only; co-production with Imagine Entertainment, Working Title Films, StudioCanal and Relativity Media
December 19, 2008	The Tale of Despereaux	co-production with Relativity Media, Larger Than Life Productions and Framestore Animation

== 2009 ==
Release date	Title	Notes
January 9, 2009	The Unborn	distribution only; produced by Rogue Pictures, Relativity Media, Platinum Dunes and Phantom Four Films
March 13, 2009	The Last House on the Left	distribution outside Australia, New Zealand, Greece, Cyprus and Singapore only; produced by Rogue Pictures, Craven/Maddalena Films, Crystal Lake Entertainment, Sean S. Cunningham Films, Scion Films and Midnight Entertainment
March 20, 2009	Duplicity	co-production with Relativity Media
April 3, 2009	Fast & Furious	co-production with Relativity Media, Original Film and One Race Films
April 17, 2009	State of Play	distribution outside France only; co-production with Working Title Films, StudioCanal, Relativity Media and Andell Entertainment
April 24, 2009	Fighting	distribution outside Australia, New Zealand and Singapore only; produced by Rogue Pictures, Relativity Media and Misher Films
April 24, 2009	The Soloist	international distribution outside France only; co-production with DreamWorks Pictures, StudioCanal, Participant Media, Krasnoff/Foster Entertainment and Working Title Films; distributed in North America by Paramount Pictures
May 29, 2009	Drag Me to Hell	distribution in North and Latin America, Germany, Austria, Switzerland, Spain and Andorra only; produced by Ghost House Pictures
June 5, 2009	Land of the Lost	co-production with Relativity Media, Sid & Marty Krofft Pictures and Mosaic Media Group
July 1, 2009	Public Enemies	co-production with Relativity Media, Forward Pass, Misher Films, Tribeca Productions and Appian Way Productions
July 10, 2009	Brüno	distribution in North America, the U.K., Ireland, Australia, New Zealand, South Africa, Germany, Austria and the Benelux only; produced by Media Rights Capital, Four by Two Films and Everyman Pictures
July 31, 2009	Funny People	co-production with Columbia Pictures, Relativity Media, Apatow Productions and Madison 23 Productions
August 7, 2009	A Perfect Getaway	U.S. distribution only; produced by Rogue, Relativity Media and QED International
August 21, 2009	Inglourious Basterds	Nominated for the Academy Award for Best Picture; Nominated for the Golden Globe Award for Best Motion Picture – Drama distribution outside the U.S. theatrically and on television and Canada only; co-production with The Weinstein Company, A Band Apart and Zehnte Babelsberg Film GmbH
September 18, 2009	Love Happens	North American and French distribution only; produced by Relativity Media, Stuber Productions and Camp/Thompson Pictures
October 2, 2009	The Invention of Lying	international distribution with Focus Features International only; produced by Radar Pictures, Media Rights Capital and Lynda Obst Productions; distributed in North America by Warner Bros. Pictures
October 9, 2009	Couples Retreat	co-production with Relativity Media, Wild West Picture Show Productions and Stuber Pictures
October 23, 2009	Cirque du Freak: The Vampire's Assistant	co-production with The Donners' Company, Depth of Field and Relativity Media (uncredited)
November 6, 2009	The Fourth Kind	U.S. distribution only; produced by Gold Circle Films, Chambara Pictures and Dead Crow Pictures
November 13, 2009	Pirate Radio	international distribution outside France only; co-production with StudioCanal and Working Title Films; distributed in North America by Focus Features (Note: Released in international theaters on April 1, 2009.)
December 25, 2009	It's Complicated	Nominated for the Golden Globe Award for Best Motion Picture – Musical or Comedy co-production with Relativity Media, Waverly Films and Scott Rudin Productions

== See also ==
- List of Focus Features films
- List of Universal Pictures theatrical animated feature films
- Universal Pictures
- Category:Lists of films by studio

== Notes ==
Release notes
