= List of Universal Pictures films (1990–1999) =

This is a list of films produced and/or distributed by Universal Pictures (founded in 1912 as the Universal Film Manufacturing Company) from 1990 to 1999. It is the main motion picture production and distribution arm of Universal Studios, a subsidiary of the NBCUniversal division of Comcast.

== 1990 ==
Release date	Title	Notes
January 19, 1990	Tremors	distribution only; produced by No Frills Productions, Pacific Western Productions and Wilson-Maddock Productions
March 9, 1990	Coupe de Ville	North American distribution only; produced by Morgan Creek Productions and Rollins-Morra-Brezner Productions
March 30, 1990	Opportunity Knocks	North American distribution only; produced by Imagine Entertainment, Brad Grey Productions and The Meledandri/Gordon Company
April 6, 1990	Cry-Baby	distribution only; produced by Imagine Entertainment
April 27, 1990	The Guardian	distribution only
May 18, 1990	Bird on a Wire	co-production with The Badham/Cohen Group and Interscope Communications
May 25, 1990	Back to the Future Part III	co-production with Amblin Entertainment
June 29, 1990	Ghost Dad	co-production with SAH Enterprises
July 6, 1990	Jetsons: The Movie	distribution only; produced by Hanna-Barbera Productions
July 27, 1990	Problem Child	distribution only; produced by Imagine Entertainment
August 3, 1990	Mo' Better Blues	distribution only; produced by 40 Acres and a Mule Filmworks
August 24, 1990	Darkman	distribution only; produced by Renaissance Pictures
October 5, 1990	Henry & June	distribution only; produced by Walrus & Associates
October 19, 1990	White Palace	distribution only; produced by Mirage Enterprises and Double Play
November 9, 1990	Child's Play 2	distribution only; produced by Living Doll Productions
December 12, 1990	Havana	distribution only; produced by Mirage Enterprises and Grimes Productions
December 21, 1990	Kindergarten Cop	co-production with Imagine Entertainment

== 1991 ==
Release date	Title	Notes
January 11, 1991	Lionheart	U.S. distribution only; produced by Imperial Entertainment
January 18, 1991	Once Around	distribution only; produced by Cinecom Entertainment Group and Double Play Productions
February 15, 1991	King Ralph	distribution only; produced by Mirage Enterprises and JBRO Productions
March 6, 1991	Closet Land	U.S. theatrical distribution only; produced by Imagine Entertainment
March 8, 1991	The Hard Way	co-production with The Badham/Cohen Group
March 29, 1991	Career Opportunities	North American distribution only; co-production with Hughes Entertainment
April 26, 1991	A Kiss Before Dying	distribution only; produced by Initial Pictures and Kellgate Limited
May 24, 1991	Backdraft	distribution only; produced by Imagine Films Entertainment and Trilogy Entertainment Group
June 7, 1991	Jungle Fever	distribution only; produced by 40 Acres and a Mule Filmworks
July 3, 1991	Problem Child 2	co-production with Imagine Films Entertainment
July 26, 1991	Mobsters	
August 9, 1991	Pure Luck	distribution only; produced by The Sean Daniel Company
August 30, 1991	Child's Play 3	co-production with Living Doll Productions
October 4, 1991	Shout	co-production with Robert Simonds Productions
October 18, 1991	Cool as Ice	distribution only; produced by Koppelman/Bandier Productions, Carnegie Pictures and Alive Films
November 1, 1991	The People Under the Stairs	distribution only; produced by Alive Films
November 13, 1991	Cape Fear	distribution only; produced by Amblin Entertainment, Cappa Films and Tribeca Productions
November 22, 1991	An American Tail: Fievel Goes West	co-production with Amblimation
December 6, 1991	At Play in the Fields of the Lord	North American, French and Spanish distribution only; produced by The Saul Zaentz Company
December 27, 1991	Fried Green Tomatoes	North American distribution only; produced by Act III Communications, Electric Shadow Productions and Avnet/Kerner Productions; Nominee of the Golden Globe Award for Best Motion Picture – Musical or Comedy

== 1992 ==
Release date	Title	Notes
January 10, 1992	Kuffs	North American distribution only; produced by Dino De Laurentiis Communications and Evans/Gideon Productions
February 21, 1992	Stop! Or My Mom Will Shoot	co-production with Northern Lights Entertainment
March 13, 1992	American Me	distribution only; produced by YOY Productions and the Sean Daniel Company; Inducted into the National Film Registry in 2024
April 3, 1992	Beethoven	co-production with Northern Lights Entertainment
April 17, 1992	The Babe	distribution only; produced by Waterhorse Productions and Finnegan-Pinchuk Productions
April 29, 1992	Leaving Normal	co-production with Mirage Enterprises
May 22, 1992	Far and Away	distribution only; produced by Imagine Films Entertainment
June 12, 1992	Housesitter	distribution only; produced by Imagine Films Entertainment
July 31, 1992	Death Becomes Her	
August 7, 1992	Raising Cain	distribution only; produced by Pacific Western Productions
September 4, 1992	Out on a Limb	co-production with Interscope Communications
September 9, 1992	Sneakers	co-production with Lasker/Parkes Productions
October 2, 1992	Mr. Baseball	co-production with Outlaw Productions and Pacific Artists
October 16, 1992	The Public Eye	distribution only; produced by South Side Amusement Company
October 23, 1992	Dr. Giggles	distribution outside Italy and Japan only; produced by Largo Entertainment, JVC Entertainment and Dark Horse Entertainment
December 23, 1992	Scent of a Woman	co-production with City Light Films; Nominee of the Academy Award for Best Picture; Winner of the Golden Globe Award for Best Motion Picture – Drama
December 25, 1992	Trespass	
December 30, 1992	Lorenzo's Oil	co-production with Kennedy Miller Productions

== 1993 ==
Release date	Title	Notes
January 29, 1993	Matinee	North American distribution only; produced by Renfield Productions
February 19, 1993	Army of Darkness	North American distribution only; produced by Dino De Laurentiis Communications and Renaissance Pictures
March 5, 1993	Mad Dog and Glory	distribution only; produced by De Fina/Cappa
March 12, 1993	CB4	distribution only; produced by Imagine Films Entertainment
April 2, 1993	Cop and a Half	distribution only; produced by Imagine Films Entertainment
April 30, 1993	Splitting Heirs	British film; distribution only; produced by Prominent Features
May 7, 1993	Dragon: The Bruce Lee Story	distribution only; produced by Raffaella De Laurentiis Productions
June 11, 1993	Jurassic Park	co-production with Amblin Entertainment; Inducted into the National Film Registry in 2018
August 13, 1993	Heart and Souls	co-production with Alphaville and Stampede Entertainment
August 20, 1993	Hard Target	distribution only; produced by Alphaville and Renaissance Pictures
September 10, 1993	The Real McCoy	North American distribution only; produced by Bregman/Baer Productions, Inc.
October 1, 1993	For Love or Money	distribution only; produced by Imagine Films Entertainment
October 15, 1993	Judgment Night	distribution outside Italy and Japan only; produced by Largo Entertainment and JVC Entertainment
November 10, 1993	Carlito's Way	distribution outside Italy, Poland, the Czech Republic, Slovakia, Bulgaria, former Yugoslavia and the CIS only; co-production with Epic Productions and Bregman/Baer Productions, Inc.
November 24, 1993	We're Back! A Dinosaur's Story	co-production with Amblimation
December 15, 1993	Schindler's List	co-production with Amblin Entertainment; Winner of the Academy Award for Best Picture; Winner of the Golden Globe Award for Best Motion Picture – Drama; Inducted into the National Film Registry in 2004
December 17, 1993	Beethoven's 2nd	co-production with Northern Lights Entertainment
December 29, 1993	In the Name of the Father	distribution only; produced by Hell's Kitchen Films; Nominee of the Academy Award for Best Picture; Nominee of the Golden Globe Award for Best Motion Picture – Drama (Note: Released in Irish theaters on December 27, 1993)

== 1994 ==
Release date	Title	Notes
February 11, 1994	The Getaway	North American distribution only; produced by Largo Entertainment, JVC Entertainment and The Turman-Foster Company
February 18, 1994	Reality Bites	distribution only; produced by Jersey Films
March 4, 1994	Greedy	co-production with Imagine Entertainment
March 18, 1994	The Paper	co-production with Imagine Entertainment
May 13, 1994	Crooklyn	distribution only; produced by 40 Acres and a Mule Filmworks and Child Hoods Productions
May 27, 1994	The Flintstones	co-production with Hanna-Barbera Productions and Amblin Entertainment
June 3, 1994	The Cowboy Way	co-production with Imagine Entertainment
July 1, 1994	The Shadow	distribution outside Italy, Poland, the Czech Republic, Slovakia, Bulgaria, former Yugoslavia and the CIS only; produced by Bregman/Baer Productions Inc.
July 15, 1994	True Lies	international distribution outside France, French-speaking Switzerland, Italy, Germany, Austria and Japan only; produced by Lightstorm Entertainment; distributed in North America, France, French-speaking Switzerland and Italy by 20th Century Fox
August 5, 1994	The Little Rascals	co-production with King World Entertainment and Amblin Entertainment
September 16, 1994	Timecop	distribution outside Italy and Japan only; produced by Largo Entertainment, JVC Entertainment, Signature Pictures, Renaissance Pictures and Dark Horse Entertainment
September 30, 1994	The River Wild	co-production with The Turman-Foster Company
October 21, 1994	Radioland Murders	distribution only; produced by Lucasfilm Ltd.
November 4, 1994	The War	distribution only; produced by Island World and Avnet/Kerner Productions
November 23, 1994	Junior	co-production with Northern Lights Entertainment
December 23, 1994	Street Fighter	North American distribution only; produced by Edward R. Pressman Productions and Capcom Co. Ltd.; distributed internationally by Columbia TriStar Film Distributors International under the title Street Fighter: The Ultimate Battle

== 1995 ==
Release date	Title	Notes
January 13, 1995	Tales from the Crypt Presents: Demon Knight	distribution only; produced by Crypt Keeper Productions
February 10, 1995	Billy Madison	co-production with Robert Simonds Productions
February 24, 1995	The Hunted	distribution only; produced by Bregman/Baer Productions, Inc. and Davis Entertainment
March 24, 1995	Major Payne	distribution only; produced by Wife 'n Kids Productions
April 21, 1995	The Cure	North American distribution only; produced by Island World
April 28, 1995	Village of the Damned	co-production with Alphaville Films
May 26, 1995	Casper	co-production with Amblin Entertainment and The Harvey Entertainment Company
June 30, 1995	Apollo 13	co-production with Imagine Entertainment; Nominee of the Academy Award for Best Picture; Nominee of the Golden Globe Award for Best Motion Picture – Drama; Inducted into the National Film Registry in 2023
July 28, 1995	Waterworld	co-production with the Gordon Company, Davis Entertainment and Licht/Mueller Film Corporation
August 4, 1995	Babe	co-production with Kennedy Miller Productions; Nominee of the Academy Award for Best Picture; Winner of the Golden Globe Award for Best Motion Picture – Musical or Comedy
September 8, 1995	To Wong Foo, Thanks for Everything! Julie Newmar	co-production with Amblin Entertainment
September 13, 1995	Clockers	distribution only; produced by 40 Acres and a Mule Filmworks
October 6, 1995	How to Make an American Quilt	co-production with Amblin Entertainment
October 13, 1995	Strange Days	international distribution outside France, French-speaking Switzerland, Italy, Germany, Austria and Japan only; produced by Lightstorm Entertainment; distributed in North America, France, French-speaking Switzerland and Italy by 20th Century Fox
November 3, 1995	Gold Diggers: The Secret of Bear Mountain	distribution only; produced by Bregman/Deyhle Productions
November 17, 1995	The American President	international distribution only; co-production with Castle Rock Entertainment and Wildwood Enterprises; distributed in North America by Columbia Pictures; Nominee of the Golden Globe Award for Best Motion Picture – Musical or Comedy.
November 22, 1995	Casino	distribution outside French home media and European television only; co-production with Syalis D.A, Légende Entreprises and De Fina/Cappa
December 22, 1995	Balto	co-production with Amblimation
December 22, 1995	Sudden Death	co-production with Shattered Productions, Signature Entertainment and Imperial Entertainment
December 29, 1995	12 Monkeys	distribution outside the U.K., Ireland, France, Germany, Austria, Switzerland and Japan only; co-production with Atlas Entertainment and Classico

== 1996 ==
Release date	Title	Notes
February 16, 1996	Happy Gilmore	co-production with Brillstein-Grey Entertainment and Robert Simonds Productions
March 15, 1996	Ed	distribution only; produced by Longview Entertainment
March 29, 1996	Sgt. Bilko	co-production with Imagine Entertainment
April 12, 1996	Fear	co-production with Imagine Entertainment
April 26, 1996	The Quest	North America, U.K. and Irish distribution only; produced by Selima Films
May 10, 1996	Twister	International distribution only; co-production with Warner Bros. and Amblin Entertainment
May 10, 1996	Flipper	distribution only; produced by the Bubble Factory
May 31, 1996	Dragonheart	distribution only; produced by Raffaella De Laurentiis Productions
June 28, 1996	The Nutty Professor	co-production with Imagine Entertainment
July 19, 1996	The Frighteners	co-production with WingNut Films
August 16, 1996	Tales from the Crypt Presents: Bordello of Blood	distribution only; produced by Crypt Keeper Productions
September 6, 1996	Bulletproof	co-production with Brillstein-Grey Entertainment and Robert Simonds Productions
September 13, 1996	Grace of My Heart	international theatrical distribution only; produced by Gramercy Pictures
October 11, 1996	The Chamber	co-production with Imagine Entertainment and Davis Entertainment
December 6, 1996	Daylight	distribution only; produced by Davis Entertainment and Joseph M. Singer Entertainment
December 24, 1996	I'm Not Rappaport	distribution only; produced by Gramercy Pictures and GreeneStreet Films

== 1997 ==
Release date	Title	Notes
January 24, 1997	Fierce Creatures	distribution only; produced by Fish Productions and Jersey Films
February 7, 1997	Dante's Peak	co-production with Pacific Western Productions
March 21, 1997	Liar Liar	co-production with Imagine Entertainment
April 4, 1997	That Old Feeling	distribution only; produced by The Bubble Factory, Boy of the Year Productions and All Girl Productions
April 18, 1997	McHale's Navy	distribution only; produced by The Bubble Factory
May 2, 1997	Commandments	distribution only; produced by Gramercy Pictures and Northern Lights Entertainment
May 23, 1997	The Lost World: Jurassic Park	co-production with Amblin Entertainment
July 11, 1997	A Simple Wish	distribution only; produced by The Bubble Factory
August 22, 1997	Leave It to Beaver	co-production with Robert Simonds Productions
August 29, 1997	Kull the Conqueror	distribution only; produced by Raffaella De Laurentiis Productions
November 14, 1997	The Jackal	distribution outside France, Germany, Austria, Switzerland and Japan only; produced by Mutual Film Company and Alphaville
December 12, 1997	For Richer or Poorer	co-production with The Bubble Factory and Yorktown Productions
December 31, 1997	The Boxer	Irish film; distribution only; produced by Hell's Kitchen Films; Nominee of the Golden Globe Award for Best Motion Picture – Drama

== 1998 ==
Release date	Title	Notes
January 16, 1998	Half Baked	co-production with Robert Simonds Productions
February 6, 1998	Blues Brothers 2000	co-production with Landis/Belzberg Productions
February 27, 1998	Kissing a Fool	North American, U.K., Irish, Australian and New Zealand distribution only; produced by R.L. Entertainment and Largo Entertainment
March 20, 1998	Primary Colors	North American, U.K. and Irish distribution only; produced by Mutual Film Company and Icarus Productions
April 3, 1998	Mercury Rising	co-production with Imagine Entertainment
May 1, 1998	Black Dog	North American, U.K. and Irish distribution only; produced by Mutual Film Company, Prelude Pictures and Raffaella De Laurentiis Productions
May 22, 1998	Fear and Loathing in Las Vegas	North American, U.K., Irish and Scandinavian distribution only; produced by Rhino Films
June 26, 1998	Out of Sight	co-production with Jersey Films
July 10, 1998	Small Soldiers	international distribution only; co-production with DreamWorks Pictures and Amblin Entertainment (uncredited)
July 31, 1998	BASEketball	co-production with Zucker Productions
August 7, 1998	Safe Men	select international distribution only; produced by October Films, Andell Entertainment and Blue Guitar Films
August 21, 1998	The Best Man	select international distribution only; produced by Filmauro and Duea Film
September 18, 1998	One True Thing	co-production with Monarch Pictures and Ufland Productions
October 16, 1998	Bride of Chucky	distribution only; produced by David Kirschner Productions; international rights outside Korea licensed to Good Machine International
October 16, 1998	Reach the Rock	distribution only; produced by Gramercy Pictures
November 13, 1998	Meet Joe Black	co-production with City Light Films
November 25, 1998	Babe: Pig in the City	co-production with Kennedy Miller Productions
December 4, 1998	Psycho	distribution only; produced by Imagine Entertainment
December 11, 1998	Shakespeare in Love	international distribution only; co-production with Miramax Films and The Bedford Falls Company; Winner of the Academy Award for Best Picture; Winner of the Golden Globe Award for Best Motion Picture – Musical or Comedy
December 25, 1998	Patch Adams	co-production with Blue Wolf Productions, Farrell/Minoff Productions and Bungalow 78 Productions; Nominee of the Golden Globe Award for Best Motion Picture – Musical or Comedy

== 1999 ==
Release date	Title	Notes
January 15, 1999	Virus	distribution in North America, the U.K., Ireland and theatrically in Germany, Austria and Switzerland only; produced by Mutual Film Company, Dark Horse Entertainment and Valhalla Motion Pictures
February 19, 1999	October Sky	distribution only; produced by Charles Gordon Productions
March 26, 1999	EDtv	co-production with Imagine Entertainment
April 2, 1999	Tea with Mussolini	international distribution outside Italy only; produced by Cattleya, Cineritmo, Medusa Film and Film and General Productions
April 16, 1999	Life	co-production with Imagine Entertainment
May 7, 1999	The Mummy	distribution only; produced by Alphaville
May 28, 1999	Notting Hill	distribution in North and Latin America, France, Germany, Austria, Switzerland, Italy and the Benelux only; produced by PolyGram Films and Working Title Films
July 9, 1999	American Pie	co-production with Zide/Perry Productions; international rights outside the U.K., Ireland, Australia, New Zealand and South Africa licensed to Summit Entertainment
August 6, 1999	Mystery Men	co-production with Lawrence Gordon Productions, Golar Productions and Dark Horse Entertainment
August 13, 1999	Bowfinger	co-production with Imagine Entertainment
August 20, 1999	Mickey Blue Eyes	international distribution outside Latin America, Scandinavia, Turkey and Asia excluding Japan only; produced by Castle Rock Entertainment and Simian Films; rights licensed to GAGA-Humax for Japan; distributed in North and Latin America, Scandinavia, Turkey and Asia excluding Japan by Warner Bros. Pictures
August 27, 1999	Dudley Do-Right	distribution only; produced by Davis Entertainment, Joseph M. Singer Entertainment and Jay Ward Productions
September 17, 1999	For Love of the Game	co-production with Beacon Pictures, Tig Productions and Mirage Enterprises
October 15, 1999	The Story of Us	North American, Australian and New Zealand distribution only; produced by Castle Rock Entertainment
October 22, 1999	The Best Man	co-production with 40 Acres and a Mule Filmworks
October 29, 1999	Being John Malkovich	distribution outside the U.S. only; produced by Propaganda Films and Single Cell Pictures; rights licensed to Sandrew Metronome for Scandinavia and Asmik Ace for Japan; distributed in the U.S. by USA Films
November 5, 1999	The Bone Collector	North American distribution only; co-acquisition with Columbia Pictures; produced by Bregman Productions
November 24, 1999	End of Days	North American distribution only; produced by Beacon Pictures
November 26, 1999	Ride with the Devil	U.S. home media and television and Canadian distribution only; co-production with Good Machine; distributed in the U.S. by USA Films
December 3, 1999	Guest House Paradiso	international distribution only; produced by PolyGram Films International and Samuelson Productions; rights licensed to Sandrew Metronome for Scandinavia, Monolith Films for Poland, Flamex for Hungary and Pyramid Films for the CIS
December 10, 1999	The Green Mile	international distribution outside Latin America, Scandinavia, Turkey and Asia excluding Japan only; produced by Castle Rock Entertainment and Darkwoods Productions; rights licensed to GAGA-Humax for Japan; distributed in North and Latin America, Scandinavia, Turkey and Asia excluding Japan by Warner Bros. Pictures; Nominee of the Academy Award for Best Picture
December 22, 1999	Man on the Moon	North American, U.K. and Irish distribution only; co-production with Mutual Film Company, Jersey Films, Cinehaus and Shapiro/West Productions; Nominee of the Golden Globe Award for Best Motion Picture – Musical or Comedy
December 22, 1999	Snow Falling on Cedars	distribution only; produced by the Kennedy/Marshall Company; rights licensed to Filmauro for Italy
December 25, 1999	Angela's Ashes	international distribution only; co-production with Paramount Pictures, David Brown Productions, Scott Rudin Productions and Dirty Hands Productions; rights licensed to Sandrew Metronome for Scandinavia and Asmik Ace for Japan
December 29, 1999	The Hurricane	North American distribution only; produced by Beacon Pictures and Azoff Films; Nominee of the Golden Globe Award for Best Motion Picture – Drama

== See also ==
- List of Focus Features films
- List of Universal Pictures theatrical animated feature films
- Universal Pictures
- Category:Lists of films by studio

Release notes
