= List of United International Pictures films =

The following is a list of films distributed by United International Pictures, a joint venture of Paramount Pictures and Universal Pictures.

- A * symbol signifies a film that was locally produced in its country of origin.
- A † symbol signifies a film that UIP acquired the worldwide distribution rights to.

== 1980s ==
Release Date	Title	Notes
May 23, 1986	Biggles *	U.K. and Irish distribution only; produced by Compact Yellowbill and Tambarle
June 26, 1986	Fortress *	Australian and New Zealand distribution only; produced by Crawford Productions and HBO Premiere Films
December 12, 1986	Flodder †	international distribution outside the Netherlands and Japan only; produced by First Floor Features
January 22, 1987	The Family *	Italian distribution only; produced by Massfilm, Cinecittà and RAI Uno
February 18, 1987	La Rumba *	French distribution only; produced by Hachette Première, PROGEFI (Production Générale de Films) and TF1 Films Productions
April 23, 1987	Course Completed *	Spanish distribution only; produced by Ministerio de Cultura and Nickel Odeon
October 28, 1987	Moors and Christians *	Spanish distribution only; produced by Anola Films S.A., Estela Films S.A. and Anem Films S.A.
October 28, 1987	The Cry of the Owl *	French distribution only; produced by Civite Casa Films, Italfrance Films and TF1
January 15, 1988	Secondo Ponzio Pilato *	Italian distribution only; produced by Massfilm and Reteitalia
March 4, 1988	Bye Bye Baby *	Italian distribution only; produced by Dean Film and Reteitalia
March 24, 1988	Kamilla and the Thief *	Norwegian distribution only; produced by Penelope Film
March 24, 1988	Stowaways on the Ark *	German and Austrian distribution only; produced by MS-Films, Paramount Filmproduction GmbH, Artemis Film GmbH and ZDF
May 13, 1988	Sinatra *	Spanish distribution only; produced by Ideas y Producciones Cinematográficas
September 23, 1988	Dear Gorbachev *	Italian distribution only; produced by Massfilm
February 16, 1989	Kamilla and the Thief II *	Norwegian distribution only; produced by Penelope Film
May 19, 1989	Little Misunderstandings *	Italian distribution only; R.P.A. International and RAI TV 2
August 25, 1989	Bryllupsfesten *	Norwegian distribution only; produced by Mefistofilm A/S

== 1990s ==
Release Date	Title	Notes
March 16, 1990	¡Ay Carmela! *	Spanish distribution only; produced by Iberoamericana Films Internacional, Televisión Española and Ellepi Films
April 6, 1990	The Miser *	Italian distribution only; produced by Splendida Film, Carthago Films S.a.r.l. and Pathé
April 17, 1991	Money	French distribution only; produced by Cinémax, Télémax, Films A2 and Malofilm Production
April 18, 1991	Indio 2: The Revolt *	Italian distribution only; produced by R.P.A. International
May 31, 1991	The Wicked	Italian distribution only; produced by P.A.C. - Produzioni Atlas Consorziate
September 19, 1991	Husband and Lovers *	Italian and Spanish distribution only; produced by Metro Film S.r.l.
April 17, 1992	The Northerners *	Dutch distribution only; produced by First Floor Features
July 3, 1992	Flodders in America *	Dutch distribution only; produced by First Floor Features
September 4, 1992	Jamón jamón *	Spanish distribution with Lolafilms only; produced by Lolafilms and Sogepaq
October 2, 1992	Carry On Columbus *	U.K. and Irish distribution only; produced by Island World
October 16, 1992	The Anonymous Queen *	Spanish distribution only; produced by Ditirambo Films and Lola Films
November 18, 1992	Malcolm X	Spanish and Japanese distribution only; produced by Largo Entertainment and 40 Acres and a Mule Filmworks
December 4, 1992	Belle Époque *	Spanish co-distribution with Lolafilms and Turkish, Argentine and Colombian distribution only; produced by Lolafilms, Fernando Trueba P.C.S.A., Animatografo, French Production, Sogepaq and Eurimages
February 5, 1993	Mario, Maria and Mario	Italian distribution only; produced by Massfilm, Matopigia, Studio El, Les Films Alain Sarde, Filmtel and SACIS
March 19, 1993	The Long Silence *	Italian distribution only; produced by Evento Spettacolo, Bioskop Film and KG Productions
April 1, 1993	The Bilingual Lover *	Spanish distribution only; produced by Lola Films
April 1, 1993	Seventh Heaven *	Benelux distribution only; produced by Added films, VTM and TROS
September 3, 1993	Intruder *	Spanish distribution only; produced by Antena 3 Televisión, Atrium Productions, Pedro Costa Producciones Cinematográficas and Promociones Audiovisuales Reunidas
September 24, 1993	Golden Balls *	Spanish distribution with Lolafilms only; produced by Lolafilms, Filmauro, Hugo Films and Lumière
October 29, 1993	Dirty Weekend *	U.K. and Irish distribution only; produced by Michael Winner Ltd. and Scimitar Films
December 22, 1993	Everyone Off to Jail *	Spanish distribution only; produced by Antea Films, Central de Producciones Audiovisuales S.L. and Sociedad General de Televisión (Sogetel)
December 25, 1993	Shadowlands *	U.K. and Irish distribution only; produced by Price Entertainment and Spelling Films International
April 8, 1994	Sentimental Maniacs *	Italian distribution only; produced by DIR International Film and Union P.N.
October 6, 1994	Días contados *	Spanish distribution only; produced by Aiete Films and Ariane Films
October 7, 1994	The Tit and the Moon *	Spanish distribution only; produced by CEA Studios, Lolafilms and Creativos Asociados de Radio y Televisión (CARTEL)
October 20, 1994	Lucky Break *	Australian and New Zealand distribution only; produced by Generations Films, Lewin Films, Such Much Films, Pandora Cinema and Australian Film Finance Corporation (AFFC)
October 24, 1994	Country Life *	Australian and New Zealand distribution only; produced by Australian Film Finance Corporation (AFFC) and Dalton Films
December 17, 1994	Belle al Bar *	Italian distribution only; produced by Union P.N.
July 20, 1995	Mushrooms *	Australian and New Zealand distribution only; produced by Rosen Harper Entertainment
October 27, 1995	Ivo the Genius *	Italian distribution only; produced by Union P.N.
December 20, 1995	The Butterfly Effect *	Spanish distribution only; produced by Canal+ España, Fernando Colomo Producciones Cinematográficas, Mainstream, Portman Productions and Televisión Española
February 2, 1996	Jane Eyre	Italian distribution only; produced by Cineritino S.r.L., Flach Film, Mediaset, Miramax Films, RCS Editori S.p.A. and Rochester
March 8, 1996	Condition Red	Finnish distribution only; produced by Oak Island Films and Marianna Films
April 12, 1996	Thesis *	Spanish distribution only; produced by Las Producciones del Escorpión and Sogepaq
October 10, 1996	De Zeemeerman *	Dutch distribution only; produced by Verenigde Nederlandsche Filmcompagnie (VNF)
November 22, 1996	Pesadilla para un rico *	Spanish distribution only; produced by Canal+ España, Rosa García Producciones Cinematográficas and Televisión Española (TVE)
December 13, 1996	The Good Life *	Spanish distribution only; produced by Fernando Trueba PC, Kaplan, Olmo Films, L. Films andAcademy Films
January 17, 1997	Como un relámpago *	Spanish distribution only; produced by Los Films del Tango and Antea Films
September 26, 1997	Face *	U.K. and Irish distribution only; produced by BBC Films
October 1, 1998	Het 14e kippetje *	Dutch distribution only; produced by IJswater Films
February 25, 1999	Dear Claudia *	Australian and New Zealand distribution only; produced by Australian Film Finance Corporation (AFFC), Jim McElroy Productions and Pacific Film and Television Commission
March 25, 1999	Asterix and Obelix vs. Caesar	Dutch distribution only; produced by Katharina, Renn Productions, TF1 Films Production, Bavaria Film, Bavaria Entertainment and Melampo Cinematografica
May 14, 1999	Parting Shots *	U.K. and Irish distribution only; produced by Scimitar Films and Michael Winner Ltd.
July 1, 1999	Sally Marshall Is Not an Alien *	Australian and New Zealand distribution only; produced by CINAR Corporation and Film Tonic
July 7, 1999	Wing Commander	French distribution under Universal Pictures only; produced by Digital Anvil and Origin Systems
August 27, 1999	The Ninth Gate	U.K, Irish, Spanish, Australian and New Zealand distribution only; produced by Araba Films, Artisan Entertainment, Origen Producciones Cinematograficas, RP Productions, Orly Films, TF1 Films Production, Via Digital and BAC Films
September 9, 1999	Siam Sunset *	Australian and New Zealand distribution only; produced by Artist Services, Showtime Australia, Channel 4 Films and New South Wales Film and Television Office
November 17, 1999	Je veux tout *	French distribution only; produced by L'Arbre et la Colombe, Les Films Alain Sarde and M6 Films
December 11, 1999	A Simple Plan	U.K. and Irish distribution under Universal Pictures only; produced by Mutual Film Company, Paramount Pictures, Savoy Pictures, BBC, Tele-München, UGC-PH, Toho-Towa, Marubeni and Newmarket Capital Group
December 22, 1999	The Muse	French distribution only; produced by October Films

== 2000s ==
Release Date	Title	Notes
January 6, 2000	8½ Women *	Dutch distribution only; produced by Movie Masters
January 28, 2000	The Cider House Rules	Scandinavian co-distribution with Scanbox Entertainment only, produced by Miramax Films and FilmColony
February 3, 2000	2000 AD *	Singaporean distribution only; produced by Media Asia Films, Raintree Pictures and People's Productions
February 9, 2000	Salsa	French distribution only under Universal Pictures; produced by Vertigo Productions
February 25, 2000	Wonder Boys	U.K. and Irish distribution only; produced by Paramount Pictures, BBC Films, Curtis Hanson Productions, Marubeni, MFF Feature Film Productions, Mutual Film Company, Scott Rudin Productions, Tele München Fernseh Produktionsgesellschaft and Toho-Towa
February 25, 2000	The Talented Mr. Ripley	Scandinavian distribution with Scanbox Entertainment only; produced by Paramount Pictures, Miramax Films and Mirage Enterprises
April 6, 2000	Selkie *	Australian and New Zealand distribution only; produced by Bluestone Pictures, Prospect Films and Prospect Productions
April 7, 2000	White Water Fury *	Scandinavian co-distribution with Scanbox Entertainment only; produced by Cinetofon
April 7, 2000	Love, Honour and Obey *	U.K. and Irish distribution under Universal Pictures only; produced by BBC Films
May 17, 2000	The King's Daughters *	French distribution only under Universal Pictures; produced by Archipel 35, Lichtblick FilmProduktion, Entre Chien et Loup, Arte France Cinéma, France 2 Cinéma, WDR, FMB Films, ACCAAN, Les Films du Camélia and Cinéart
June 28, 2000	Sur un air d'autoroute *	French distribution only; produced by Fidélité Productions, France 2, EuropaCorp, SCOPE and Studio 37
October 27, 2000	The Bench *	Scandinavian distribution only; produced by Scanbox Entertainment and Zentropa
November 9, 2000	Bless the Child	German and Austrian distribution with Advanced Film only; produced by Paramount Pictures, Icon Productions and Mace Neufeld Productions
January 24, 2001	Made in France *	French distribution under Universal Pictures only; produced by Blue Films, Deluxe Productions, M6 Films, New Mark and Rhône-Alpes Cinéma
February 23, 2001	The Classic *	Finnish distribution only; produced by Sputnik
March 16, 2001	Elling *	Scandinavian distribution under Universal Pictures only; produced by Maipo Film
June 14, 2001	De Vriendschap *	Dutch distribution only; produced by Sigma Pictures Productions and AVRO
June 20, 2001	Un ange	French distribution only; produced by Canal+, IMA Productions and M6 Films
August 9, 2001	The Lost Steps *	Spanish distribution only; produced by Anola Films S.L.
September 6, 2001	The Moving True Story of a Woman Ahead of Her Time *	Dutch distribution only; produced by Egmond Film & Television and VPRO
September 6, 2001	On the Edge *	U.K. and Irish distribution under Universal Pictures only; produced by Hell's Kitchen Productions
October 24, 2001	Gregoire Moulin vs. Humanity *	French distribution under Universal Pictures only; produced by LGM Productions, M6 Films, Rhône-Alpes Cinéma and SFP
October 25, 2001	The Abrafaxe – Under The Black Flag *	German and Austrian distribution under Universal Pictures only; produced by Abrafaxe Trickfilm and Hahn Film
November 14, 2001	One Leg Kicking *	Singaporean distribution only; produced by Raintree Pictures, Zhao Wei Films and Singapore Film Communication
November 14, 2001	Pretty Things *	French distribution only; produced by SND Films, Hugo Films, M6 Films and C.A.P.A.C.
January 3, 2002	Jeepers Creepers	German and Austrian co-distribution with VCL Communications only; produced by United Artists, American Zoetrope, Capitol Films and Cinerenta
February 9, 2002	I Not Stupid *	Singaporean distribution only; produced by Mediacorp Raintree Pictures
February 14, 2002	Qui vive *	Dutch distribution only; produced by Egmond Film and Television and NPS
February 20, 2002	Gangsters *	French distribution under Universal Pictures only; produced by A.J.O.Z. Films, LGM Productions, Cinétévé, France 3 Cinéma, Saga Film (I) and RTBF
February 27, 2002	Vivante *	French distribution only; produced by Île Productions
March 1, 2002	The Man Without a Past *	Finnish distribution only; produced by Sputnik
April 19, 2002	Charlotte Gray	distribution in France, the Benelux, Switzerland, Scandinavia, Spain, Italy, Australia, New Zealand and Japan under Universal Pictures only; produced by FilmFour, Senator Filmproduktion and Ecosse Films
September 5, 2002	Oysters at Nam Kee's *	Dutch distribution only; produced by Egmond Film and Television and VARA
February 14, 2003	Jonny Vang *	Scandinavian distribution under Universal Pictures only; produced by Maipo Film
March 21, 2003	Soldiers of Salamina *	Spanish distribution only; produced by Lolafilms and Fernando Trueba PC
May 15, 2003	Shaolin Soccer	Dutch distribution only
August 7, 2003	Homerun	Singaporean distribution only; produced by Mediacorp Raintree Pictures
September 24, 2003	Hero	French distribution only; produced by Sil-Metropole Organisation, CFCC, Elite Group Enterprises, Zhang Yimou Studio and Beijing New Picture Film
October 2, 2003	Rosenstrasse	Dutch distribution under Universal Pictures only; produced by Studio Hamburg Letterbox Filmproduktion, Tele München Fernseh Produktionsgesellschaft (TMG) and Get Reel Productions
October 10, 2003	Mother's Elling *	Scandinavian distribution under Universal Pictures only; produced by Maipo Film
October 11, 2003	Polleke *	Dutch distribution only; produced by Egmond Film & Television and VPRO
October 30, 2003	Luther	German and Austrian distribution only; produced by Eikon Film and NFP Teleart Berlin
October 31, 2003	The Weakness of the Bolshevik *	Spanish distribution only; produced by Antena 3 Films, Canal+ Espana and Rioja Audiovisual
November 7, 2003	Kiss Me First *	Italian distribution only; produced by Sunflower Production
November 27, 2003	Young Kees *	Dutch distribution under Universal Pictures only; produced by Sigma Pictures Productions and NCRV
December 5, 2003	Thirteen	U.K. and Irish distribution under Universal Pictures only; produced by Fox Searchlight Pictures, Working Title Films and Antidote Films
December 19, 2003	The 3 Wise Men *	Spanish distribution only; produced by Animagicstudio, Carrere Group D.A. and Telemadrid
December 20, 2003	Bruce Almighty	Japanese distribution only; produced by Universal Pictures, Spyglass Entertainment, Shady Acres Entertainment and The Pitbull Company
January 15, 2004	21 Grams	Latin American and Spanish distribution under Universal Pictures only; produced by Focus Features and This is That Productions
January 29, 2004	Fighting Fish *	Dutch distribution under Universal Pictures only; produced by Three Kings Produkties and Riverpark Film
February 12, 2004	Love Trap *	Dutch distribution under Universal Pictures only; produced by PVPictures and TROS
February 13, 2004	Lost in Translation	Australian, New Zealand, Spanish and Latin American distribution under Universal Pictures only; produced by Focus Features, American Zoetrope and Elemental Films
February 20, 2004	Where's Firuze?	Turkish distribution only; produced by IFR
March 5, 2004	Dark Blue	Spanish distribution under Universal Pictures only; produced by United Artists, Intermedia Films, Comsic Pictures and IM Filmproduktion
March 11, 2004	Out of Time	German and Austrian co-distribution with Universum Film only; produced by Metro-Goldwyn-Mayer, Original Film and Monarch Pictures
April 23, 2004	The 7th Day *	Spanish distribution only; produced by Lolafilms
April 28, 2004	The Year of the Flood *	Spanish distribution only; produced by GONA, Oberon Cinematográfica, Babe and Kairòs
May 8, 2004	The Missing	Japanese distribution only; produced by Columbia Pictures, Revolution Studios and Imagine Entertainment
May 21, 2004	The Texas Chainsaw Massacre	Spanish distribution under Universal Pictures only; produced by New Line Cinema, Focus Features, Radar Pictures and Platinum Dunes
June 9, 2004	The Best Bet *	Singaporean distribution only; produced by Raintree Pictures and UD Concepts
June 18, 2004	The Best of Youth	Spanish co-distribution with Araba Films only; produced by Rai Fiction
June 25, 2004	Pelé Eterno *	Brazilian distribution under Universal Pictures only; produced by Cinearte Filmes and Anima Produções Audiovisuais
June 26, 2004	Taegukgi: The Brotherhood of War	Japanese and French distribution only; produced by Showbox, KD Media, KTB Network, OCN, Prime Venture Capital, Seoul Broadcasting System and Kang Je-gyu Films
July 9, 2004	Cine Gibi: O Filme *	Brazilian distribution under Paramount Pictures only; produced by Mauricio de Sousa Produções and TeleImage
July 23, 2004	Isi-Disi, Rough Love *	Spanish distribution only; produced by Lolafilms, MTV Films Europe and Intuition Films
September 29, 2004	Fahrenheit 9/11	select international distribution including Malaysia, Hong Kong, Taiwan, the Philippines, Indonesia, India and South Africa only; produced by Dog Eat Dog Films
September 30, 2004	Man on Fire	German and Austrian distribution under Paramount Pictures only; produced by Fox 2000 Pictures, Regency Enterprises and Scott Free Productions
October 1, 2004	Hellboy	Japanese distribution only; produced by Columbia Pictures, Revolution Studios, Lawrence Gordon Productions and Dark Horse Entertainment
October 6, 2004	Eternal Sunshine of the Spotless Mind	Latin American, French and Swiss distribution under Universal Pictures only; produced by Focus Features, Anonymous Content and This Is That Productions
October 8, 2004	Hypnos *	Spanish distribution only; produced by DeAPlaneta
October 28, 2004	7 Dwarves – Men Alone in the Wood *	German and Austrian distribution under Universal Pictures only; produced by Zipfelmützen GmbH & Co. and KGVIP 2 Medienfonds
October 29, 2004	Coffee and Cigarettes	Spanish co-distribution with Araba Films only; produced by United Artists, Smokescreen, Asmik Ace and BIM Distribuzione
November 2, 2004	The Motorcycle Diaries	Korean co-distribution with Korea Screen and Cineclick Asia only; produced by FilmFour, Wildwood Enterprises, Inc, South Fork Pictures and Tu Vas Voir Productions
November 5, 2004	Vanity Fair	U.K., Irish, French, Spanish and Benelux distribution under Universal Pictures only; produced by Focus Features, Tempesta Films and Granada Productions
November 5, 2004	The Grudge	U.K. and Irish distribution under Universal Pictures only; produced by Columbia Pictures and Ghost House Pictures
November 17, 2004	House of Flying Daggers	French, Australian and New Zealand distribution under Universal Pictures only; produced by Edko Films, Elite Group Enterprises, China Film Co-Production Corporation and Zhang Yimou Studio
November 26, 2004	2046	Spanish co-distribution with Araba Films only; produced by Jet Tone Productions, Block 2 Pictures, Paradis Films, Orly Films, Classic SRL, Shanghai Film Group, Arte France Cinéma, France 3 Cinéma, ZDF-Arte, Prokino and Fortissimo Films
December 9, 2004	Erik of het klein insectenboek *	Dutch distribution only; produced by Egmond Film & Television and AVRO
December 10, 2004	Seed of Chucky	Australian, New Zealand, Israeli, Italian and Spanish distribution under Universal Pictures only; produced by Rogue Pictures, La Sienega Productions and David Kirschner Productions
January 6, 2005	Deck Dogz *	Australian and New Zealand distribution under Universal Pictures only; produced by Best FX (Boom Sound) and Deck Dogz Films
February 3, 2005	Felix - Ein Hase auf Weltreise *	German and Austrian distribution under Universal Pictures only; produced by Mondo TV, Neue Deutsche Filmgesellschaft (NDF), Caligari Film GmbH, ZDF, MIM Mondo IGEL Media and WunderWerk
March 4, 2005	Boogeyman	Select international distribution including the U.K. and Ireland under Universal Pictures only; produced by Screen Gems, Ghost House Pictures and Senator International
March 31, 2005	Assault on Precinct 13	Australian, New Zealand and Spanish distribution under Universal Pictures only; produced by Rogue Pictures, Why Not Productions and Liaison Films
May 12, 2005	Unleashed	distribution in the U.K., Ireland, Australia, New Zealand, Germany and Austria under Universal Pictures only; produced by EuropaCorp, TF1 Films Production, Danny the Dog Ltd., Current Entertainment and Canal+
June 3, 2005	The League of Gentlemen's Apocalypse *	U.K. and Irish distribution under Universal Pictures only
September 9, 2005	Green Street *	U.K. and Irish distribution under Universal Pictures only; produced by OddLot Entertainment
September 23, 2005	Elsk meg i morgen *	Scandinavian distribution under Universal Pictures only; produced by Maipo Film
November 11, 2005	The Constant Gardener	distribution in Latin America, the U.K., Ireland, Australia, New Zealand and Spain under Universal Pictures only; produced by Focus Features, UK Film Council, Potboiler Productions and Scion Films
November 18, 2005	Domino	Latin American and Japanese distribution under Universal Pictures and Australian and New Zealand distribution under Paramount Pictures only; produced by New Line Cinema, Scott Free Productions, Davis Films, Metropolitan Filmexport and Summit Entertainment
December 7, 2005	The Ice Harvest	distribution in Latin America, the U.K., Ireland, Australia, New Zealand and Spain under Universal Pictures only; produced by Focus Features and Bona Fide Productions
January 20, 2006	Brokeback Mountain	Spanish distribution under Universal Pictures only; produced by Focus Features and River Road Entertainment
January 26, 2006	I Not Stupid Too *	Singaporean and Malaysian distribution only; produced by Mediacorp Raintree Pictures and Scorpio East Entertainment
March 13, 2006	Het Woeden der Gehele Wereld *	Dutch distribution under Universal Pictures only; produced by Nedfilm and TROS
March 31, 2006	Basic Instinct 2	Spanish co-distribution with Araba Films only; produced by Metro-Goldwyn-Mayer, C2 Pictures, Intermedia Films, IMF Productions and Kanzaman Productions
April 6, 2006	Sportsman of the Century *	Dutch distribution under Paramount Pictures only; produced by PVPictures and Staccato Films
May 24, 2006	Zidane: A 21st Century Portrait *	French distribution under Universal Pictures only; produced by Anna Lena Films, Naflastrengir and Fondazione Sandretto Re Rebaudengo
June 2, 2006	Fearless	distribution in the U.K., Ireland, Australia, New Zealand, France and Spain under Universal Pictures only; produced by Edko Films, China Film Co-Production Corporation, Beijing Film Studio, China Film Group Corporation and Hero China International
June 23, 2006	Half Light	U.K. and Irish distribution under Universal Pictures only; produced by Lakeshore Entertainment
July 28, 2006	Silent Hill	Select international distribution only; produced by Silent Hill DCP Inc., Davis Films and Konami
July 28, 2006	Stay Alive	U.K. and Irish distribution under Universal Pictures only; produced by Spyglass Entertainment, Endgame Entertainment and Wonderland Sound and Vision
August 11, 2006	Step Up	distribution in the U.K., Ireland, France, Switzerland, Australia and New Zealand under Universal Pictures only; produced by Summit Entertainment and Offspring Entertainment
September 1, 2006	Crank	U.K. and Irish distribution under Universal Pictures only; produced by Lionsgate, Lakeshore Entertainment and Radical Media
September 7, 2006	DOA: Dead or Alive	distribution in the U.K., Ireland, Australia, New Zealand and Italy under Universal Pictures only; produced by Constantin Film, Tecmo, Mindfire Entertainment and VIP 4 Medienfonds
September 8, 2006	Pulse	U.K. and Irish distribution under Paramount Pictures only; produced by Dimension Films and Distant Horizon
September 22, 2006	Clerks II	U.K. and Irish distribution under Paramount Pictures only; produced by The Weinstein Company and View Askew Productions
September 29, 2006	Go Away from Me *	Spanish distribution only; produced by Gona Cine y TV
October 6, 2006	Don't Come Knocking	Spanish co-distribution with Araba Films only; produced by Sony Pictures Classics, Reverse Angle Productions, HanWay Films, ZDF, Arte, Arte France Cinéma, Ocean Films, Road Movies Filmproduktion, EuroArts and Recorded Picture Company
October 20, 2006	The Grudge 2	U.K. and Irish distribution only; produced by Columbia Pictures, Ghost House Pictures and Mandate Pictures
October 25, 2006	Elephant Tales	French distribution only under Universal Pictures; produced by Myriad Pictures, Adelaide Production, Film Finance Corporation Australia, StudioCanal and Breakout Films
October 26, 2006	7 Dwarves: The Forest Is Not Enough *	German and Austrian distribution under Universal Pictures only; produced by Zipfelmützen GmbH & Co. and KGVIP 2 Medienfonds
November 2, 2006	Death Note	Korean co-distribution with Keowon Film only; produced by Nikkatsu and Nippon Television
November 17, 2006	Harsh Times	Turkish distribution only; produced by Bauer Martinez Studios and Crave Films
February 16, 2007	Shark Bait	Turkish distribution only; produced by CJ Entertainment and WonderWorld Studios
March 16, 2007	Bridge to Terabithia	Turkish distribution only; produced by Walt Disney Pictures and Walden Media
April 7, 2007	Rob-B-Hood	Japanese distribution under Universal Pictures only; produced by Emperor Motion Pictures and Huayi Brothers
April 20, 2007	Pars: Operation Cherry	Turkish distribution only; co-production with Sinegraf
June 22, 2007	The Hoax	Turkish distribution only; produced by Miramax Films, Yari Film Group, The Mark Gordon Company and Syndicate Films International
September 14, 2007	The Hunting Party	Turkish distribution only; produced by The Weinstein Company, Intermedia Films, QED International and Cherry Road
November 16, 2007	Garfield Gets Real	Turkish distribution only; produced by Paws, Inc., The Animation Picture Company and Davis Entertainment
January 8, 2008	The Masked Gang: Cyprus	Turkish distribution only; produced by Arzu Film and Fida Film
February 1, 2008	Mr. Magorium's Wonder Emporium	Turkish distribution only; produced by Mandate Pictures, Walden Media and FilmColony
February 29, 2008	The Mist	Turkish distribution with TMC Film only; produced by Dimension Films and Darkwoods
March 7, 2008	Love in the Time of Cholera	Turkish distribution only; produced by Grosvenor Park Productions and Stone Village Pictures
March 21, 2008	Juno	Turkish distribution only; produced by Fox Searchlight Pictures, Mandate Pictures and Mr. Mudd
March 28, 2008	In the Valley of Elah	Turkish distribution only; produced by Warner Independent Pictures, Summit Entertainment and Samuels Media
April 25, 2008	Step Up 2: The Streets	Turkish distribution only; produced by Summit Entertainment and Offspring Entertainment
May 2, 2008	The Hottie and the Nottie	Turkish distribution only; produced by Purple Pictures
May 9, 2008	Taken	Turkish distribution with TMC Film only; produced by EuropaCorp, M6 Films, Grive Productions, Canal+, M6 and TPS Star
May 16, 2008	Never Back Down	Turkish distribution only; produced by Summit Entertainment and Mandalay Pictures
May 30, 2008	Sex and the City	Turkish distribution only; produced by New Line Cinema and HBO Films
July 25, 2008	Smart People	Turkish distribution only; produced by Groundswell Productions, QED International and Visitor Pictures
October 17, 2008	Disaster Movie	Turkish distribution only; produced by Grosvenor Park Productions and The Safran Company
October 24, 2008	Three Monkeys	Turkish distribution only; produced by Zeyno Film, NBC Film and Pyramide Productions
October 31, 2008	Bangkok Dangerous	Turkish co-distribution with TMC Film and Avsar Film only; produced by Initial Entertainment Group, Virtual Studios and Saturn Films
November 21, 2008	The Ottoman Republic *	Turkish distribution only; produced by Avsar Film
November 27, 2008	Mr. Bones 2: Back from the Past	South African distribution only; produced by Videovision Entertainment and Distant Horizon
December 5, 2008	A.R.O.G *	Turkish distribution only; produced by CMYLMZ Fikir Art and Fida Film
February 12, 2009	Push	Thai distribution only; produced by Summit Entertainment, Icon Productions and Infinity Features
March 27, 2009	New in Town	Turkish distribution only; produced by Gold Circle Films, Epidemic Pictures, The Safran Company and Edmonds Entertainment
March 27, 2009	Mesrine	Turkish distribution with TMC Film only; produced by Kinology, La Petite Reine, M6 Films, Remstar, Novo RPI, Telefilm Canada, M6, TPS Star and Canal+
December 18, 2009	Vavien *	Turkish distribution only; produced by Imaj

== 2010s ==
Release Date	Title	Notes
January 1, 2010	Yahşi Batı	Turkish distribution only; produced by Fida Film and CMYLMZ Fikirsanat
January 7, 2010	Bodyguards and Assassins	Thai distribution only; produced by Bona Film Group, Cinema Popular and We Pictures
February 26, 2010	Eyyvah Eyvah	Turkish distribution only; produced by BKM
April 2, 2010	The Imaginarium of Doctor Parnassus	Turkish distribution only; produced by Davis Films, Infinity Features and Telefilm Canada
April 16, 2010	Astro Boy	Turkish distribution only; produced by Summit Entertainment and Imagi Animation Studios
July 23, 2010	Goal III: Taking on the World	South African co-distribution with Videovision Entertainment only; produced by Milkshake Films
January 7, 2011	Eyyvah Eyvah 2	Turkish distribution only; produced by BKM
February 4, 2011	Love Likes Coincidences	Turkish distribution only; produced by Böcek Yapım
April 14, 2011	The Lincoln Lawyer	Danish co-distribution with Mis. Label only; produced by Lionsgate, Lakeshore Entertainment, Sidney Kimmel Entertainment and Stone Village Pictures
April 15, 2011	Scream 4	Turkish co-distribution with D Productions only; produced by Dimension Films and Outerbanks Entertainment
November 3, 2011	The Well-Digger's Daughter	Danish co-distribution with Mis. Label only; produced by Pathé, Les Films Alain Sarde and TF1 Films Production
November 25, 2011	The Ides of March	Turkish co-distribution with D Productions only; produced by Columbia Pictures, Cross Creek Pictures, Exclusive Media, Smokehouse Pictures and Appian Way Productions
March 1, 2012	This Life	Danish distribution only; produced by Regner Grasten Film
August 30, 2012	The Expendables 2	Danish co-distribution with Mis. Label only; produced by Millennium Films and Nu Image
September 7, 2012	The Tall Man	Turkish co-distribution with D Productions only; produced by Radar Films and Minds Eye Entertainment
September 28, 2012	Dredd	South African co-distribution with Videovision Entertainment only; produced by IM Global, Reliance Entertainment, DNA Films, Rena Films and Peach Tree Films
October 12, 2012	Uzun Hikâye	Turkish distribution only; produced by Sinegraf and Şafak Film
September 26, 2013	Riddick	Danish co-distribution with Mis. Label only; produced by Universal Pictures, One Race Films and Radar Pictures
November 28, 2013	Mandela: Long Walk to Freedom	South African distribution only; produced by Pathé, Videovision Entertainment, Distant Horizon and Origin Pictures
December 6, 2013	Düğün Dernek	Turkish distribution only; produced by BKM Film and UVT-Soho
February 20, 2014	Lone Survivor	Danish co-distribution with Mis. Label only; produced by Universal Pictures, Emmett/Furla Films, Film 44, Herrick Entertainment, Envision Entertainment, Spikings Entertainment, Single Berry Productions, Closest to the Hole, Leverage Productions and Foresight Unlimited
April 18, 2014	Konfetti	South African distribution only; produced by Light and Dark Films
May 8, 2014	Flow	Danish distribution only; produced by Mis. Label, Beofilm, Meta Film and New Danish Screen
July 25, 2014	Cold Harbour	South African distribution only; produced by Ten10 Films
August 14, 2014	The Expendables 3	Danish co-distribution with Mis. Label only; produced by Lionsgate, Millennium Films, Nu Image and Davis Films
October 2, 2014	Delirium	Argentine distribution only; produced by Cinema 7 Films and Aicon Music Pictures
October 23, 2014	John Wick	Danish co-distribution with Mis. Label only; produced by Summit Entertainment, Thunder Road Films and 87Eleven Productions
January 9, 2015	Telling Tales	Turkish distribution only; produced by BKM
March 19, 2015	The Gunman	Danish co-distribution with Mis. Label only; produced by StudioCanal, Anton Capital Entertainment, Canal+, Nostromo Pictures, Silver Pictures and TF1 Films Production
March 26, 2015	Husband Factor	Turkish distribution only; produced by BKM
September 17, 2015	The Transporter Refueled	Danish co-distribution with Mis. Label only; produced by EuropaCorp, TF1 Films Production, Fundamental Films and Belga Films
December 25, 2015	Point Break	Danish co-distribution with Mis. Label only; produced by Alcon Entertainment, DMG Entertainment, Babelsberg Studio and Ehrman Productions
February 5, 2016	Bad Cat	Turkish distribution only; produced by Anima İstanbul and Kare Kare Film Yapim
November 10, 2016	Hacksaw Ridge	Danish co-distribution with Mis. Label only; produced by Summit Entertainment, Cross Creek Pictures, IM Global, Permut Presentations and Dearmest Films
August 3, 2017	Valerian and the City of a Thousand Planets	Danish co-distribution with Mis. Label only; produced by EuropaCorp, Fundamental Films, TF1 Films Production, Orange Studio, Novo Pictures, Universum Film, River Road Entertainment, Belga Films Fund, OCS, TF1, BNP Paribas and Valerian S.A.S.
August 31, 2017	The Hitman's Bodyguard	Danish co-distribution with Mis. Label only; produced by Summit Entertainment and Millennium Media
December 7, 2017	Suburbicon	Danish co-distribution with Mis. Label only; produced by Bloom Media, Black Bear Pictures, Dark Castle Entertainment and Smokehouse Pictures
February 8, 2018	Up and Away	Danish co-distribution with Mis. Label only; produced by M&M Productions and A. Film Production
January 24, 2019	Kursk	Danish co-distribution with Mis. Label only; produced by EuropaCorp, Belga Films, Belga Productions, Via East and Transfilm International
April 11, 2019	Hellboy	Danish co-distribution with Mis. Label only; produced by Summit Entertainment, Millennium Media, Dark Horse Entertainment, Lawrence Gordon Productions, Davis Films and Campbell Grobman Films
May 30, 2019	Missing Link	Danish co-distribution with Mis. Label only; produced by AGC International and Laika
July 18, 2019	Child's Play	Danish co-distribution with Mis. Label only; produced by Orion Pictures, Bron Studios, Creative Wealth Media Finance and KatzSmith Productions
August 8, 2019	Poms	Danish co-distribution with Mis. Label only; produced by STX Entertainment, Entertainment One, Sierra/Affinity, Mad as Birds and Rose Pictures
November 7, 2019	Midway	Danish co-distribution with Mis. Label only; produced by Summit Entertainment, Centropolis Entertainment, AGC Studios, Street Entertainment, Bona Film Group, Ruyi Films, Starlight Media, Entertainment One and The Mark Gordon Company

== 2020s ==
Release Date	Title	Notes
July 9, 2020	The Outpost	Danish co-distribution with Mis. Label only; produced by Millennium Media
July 30, 2020	Train to Busan Presents: Peninsula	Danish co-distribution with Mis. Label only; produced by Next Entertainment World and Red Peter Film
July 15, 2021	Hitman's Wife's Bodyguard	Danish co-distribution with Mis. Label only; produced by Summit Entertainment and Millennium Media
February 17, 2022	Moonfall	Danish co-distribution with Mis. Label only; produced by Summit Entertainment, Centropolis Entertainment, Huayi Brothers, Tencent Pictures, AGC Studios and Street Entertainment
August 5, 2022	Eiffel	South African co-distribution with Videovision Entertainment only; produced by Pathé, M6 Films, Constantin Film, Scope Pictures and VVZ Production
November 11, 2022	Notre-Dame on Fire	South African co-distribution with Videovision Entertainment only; produced by Pathé, TF1 Films Production, Wildside, Reperage Films and Vendome Production
February 9, 2023	Asterix & Obelix: The Middle Kingdom	Danish co-distribution with Mis. Label only; produced by Pathé, TF1 Films Production and Tresor Films
April 20, 2023	Beau Is Afraid	Danish co-distribution with Mis. Label only; produced by A24 and Square Peg
September 21, 2023	Expend4bles	Danish co-distribution with Mis. Label only; produced by Millennium Media, Templeton Media, Campbell Grobman Films and Media Capital Technologies
January 25, 2024	The Taste of Things	Danish co-distribution with Mis. Label only; produced by Gaumont, France 2 Cinéma, Umedia and Curiosa Films
May 16, 2024	Boy Kills World	Danish co-distribution with Mis. Label only; produced by Capstone Pictures, Vertigo Entertainment, Hammerstone Studios and Raimi Productions
May 30, 2024	Knox Goes Away	Danish co-distribution with Mis. Label only; produced by FilmNation Entertainment and Brookstreet Pictures
July 18, 2024	Sylvanian Families the Movie: A Gift from Freya	Danish co-distribution with Mis. Label only; produced by Epoch Co. and Frebari
August 23, 2024	Inspector Sun and the Curse of the Black Widow	South African co-distribution with Forefront Media Group only; produced by Kapers Animation, The Thinklab, Gordon Box, 3Doubles Producciones and Particular Crowd
December 19, 2024	Strange Darling	Danish co-distribution with Mis. Label only; produced by Miramax and Spooky Pictures

== See also ==
- Lists of Universal Pictures films
- Lists of Paramount Pictures films
