= United International Pictures =

Film distribution company

- Logo used since 2000
- Type: Joint venture (1981–2027); Subsidiary (2027–present)
- Predecessor: United Artists International; Cinema International Corporation (1970–1981)
- Founded: 1981; 45 years ago
- Founders: Arthur Abeles; Lew Wasserman
- Owners: Metro-Goldwyn-Mayer (1981–2001); Universal Pictures (1981–present); Paramount Pictures (1981–2027; pending sale); DreamWorks SKG (1995–2008)
- Parent: Universal Filmed Entertainment Group (pending sale)
- Website: uip.com

United International Pictures (UIP) is a film distribution joint venture becoming fully owned by NBCUniversal via Universal Filmed Entertainment Group. The company primarily distributes films in territories outside of North America.

UIP was formed in 1981 through the merger of Cinema International Corporation and United Artists International. It initially distributed films for Paramount, Universal, DreamWorks, and Metro-Goldwyn-Mayer (MGM), although MGM later withdrew from the venture and transferred its international distribution rights to 20th Century Fox. In 2007, UIP substantially downsized its operations and exited 16 territories, with Paramount and Universal taking over distribution of their respective films in those markets. Approximately 20 territories would remain served by UIP.

In July 2026, Paramount Skydance agreed to divest its stake in UIP to Universal as a condition of its acquisition of Warner Bros. Discovery.

== History ==
=== Cinema International Corporation (1970–1981) ===
In 1970, Paramount Pictures and Universal Pictures combined their international theatrical distribution operations to form Cinema International Corporation (CIC), which was registered in England and Wales. The venture was established as the studios sought to reduce overseas distribution costs amid declining cinema attendance and changing market conditions. CIC initially handled the international distribution of Paramount and Universal films outside the United States and Canada.

In 1973, Metro-Goldwyn-Mayer (MGM) closed its international distribution offices and joined CIC, which thereafter distributed MGM films internationally alongside those of Paramount and Universal.

=== United International Pictures (1981–2006) ===
In 1981, following the merger of MGM and United Artists (UA), UA's international distribution operations were incorporated into CIC. The company thus was subsequently reorganised as United International Pictures (UIP), effective 1 November 1981, with Paramount Pictures, Universal Pictures and MGM/UA as its principal partners.

In 1986, Ted Turner acquired MGM/UA for $1.5 billion but, subsequently sold United Artists and other parts of the company back to Kirk Kerkorian while retaining much of MGM's pre-May 1986 film and television library.

UIP also operated a subscription television arm, UIP Pay TV, which distributed films from Paramount, MGM/UA and Universal to broadcasters outside the United States and Canada. In 1986, Canal+ reached an agreement with UIP to acquire television rights to as many as 80 films for the French market. In 1992, the company had a financing deal with Lightstorm Entertainment to provide funding for 12 pictures and international rights.

In 1999, Universal Pictures acquired PolyGram Filmed Entertainment, whose international distribution arm was subsequently reorganised as Universal Pictures International. For a brief period, some Universal releases were handled outside UIP before Universal renewed its participation in the joint venture through 2006. In 1999, Metro-Goldwyn-Mayer (MGM) announced that it would leave UIP and transfer its international distribution to 20th Century Fox once its existing agreement with UIP expired in November 2000. In 2002, UIP withdrew from direct distribution in Finland, with its releases subsequently handled by Buena Vista International Finland; in 2006, distribution passed to Finnkino.

=== Reorganisation and later operations (2007–present) ===
In September 2005, to take advantage of the growth of the international box office since it was originally founded, UIP announced that it would downsize and restructure its operations; beginning 1 January 2007, UIP would exit 16 major international markets (including Austria, Australia, Belgium, Brazil, France, Germany, Ireland, Italy, Mexico, the Netherlands, New Zealand, Russia, South Korea, Spain, Switzerland, and the United Kingdom), and Paramount and Universal would transition to self-distributing their respective films in those markets.

As part of the agreement, UIP's assets in the affected markets were divided between Paramount and Universal on a country-by-country basis, allowing them to become the basis for their own theatrical distribution operations. Paramount and Universal also entered into a two-year agreement allowing their films to be sub-distributed through each other.

UIP, would continue to directly distribute films in approximately 20 other markets, including Argentina, Chile, Colombia, Denmark, Greece, Hungary, India, Malaysia, Norway, Peru, Poland, Singapore, South Africa, Sweden, Taiwan, Thailand and Turkey. In late-2007, UIP withdrew from the Japanese market, with Paramount Pictures establishing its own theatrical distribution operation in the country from 2008. Universal Pictures separately entered a theatrical distribution agreement with Toho-Towa for its releases in Japan. In the Philippines, UIP releases were distributed by several local partners over time, including Warner Bros., Viva International Pictures, Solar Entertainment Corporation and Sony Pictures Releasing. Following the end of UIP's local operations in 2020, Universal later entered a theatrical distribution agreement with Warner Bros., while Paramount continued to use Columbia Pictures for its releases in the country.. In 2021, Warner Bros. began to distribute Universal films in Brazil under a licensing agreement.

=== Paramount divestment agreement (2026) ===
In July 2026, the European Commission approved a proposed acquisition of Warner Bros. Discovery by Paramount Skydance, but found that Paramount's ownership of Warner Bros. Pictures would lead to market concentration for film distribution in the 19 European territories where UIP operates. To achieve regulatory approval, Paramount agreed to divest its stake in UIP to Universal within 13 months of the sale's completion. In addition, Paramount agreed not to enter into any distribution agreements with Universal within the European Economic Area for 10 years, nor enter into distribution agreements for Warner Bros. films in the 19 aforementioned territories with companies that also distribute Disney or Universal films.

== See also ==
- List of United International Pictures films
