= List of Universal Pictures films (1980–1989) =

This is a list of films produced or distributed by Universal Pictures in 1980–1989, founded in 1912 as the Universal Film Manufacturing Company. It is the main motion picture production and distribution arm of Universal Studios, a subsidiary of the NBCUniversal division of Comcast.

== 1980 ==
Release Date	Title	Notes
January 25, 1980	Guyana: Cult of the Damned	North American distribution only
February 8, 1980	The Last Married Couple in America	
March 7, 1980	Coal Miner's Daughter	Nominee of the Academy Award for Best Picture; Winner of the Golden Globe Award for Best Motion Picture – Drama; Inducted into the National Film Registry in 2019
March 21, 1980	Little Miss Marker	
April 18, 1980	North Sea Hijack	British film; distribution only
April 25, 1980	Where the Buffalo Roam	
May 9, 1980	The Nude Bomb	co-production with Time-Life Films
May 23, 1980	The Gong Show Movie	
June 13, 1980	The Island	co-production with Zanuck/Brown Company
June 20, 1980	The Blues Brothers	Inducted into the National Film Registry in 2020
July 18, 1980	Cheech and Chong's Next Movie	co-production with C&C Brown Productions
August 8, 1980	Xanadu	
August 15, 1980	Smokey and the Bandit II	co-production with Rastar
September 19, 1980	Melvin and Howard	Nominee of the Golden Globe Award for Best Motion Picture – Musical or Comedy
September 26, 1980	In God We Tru$t	
September 26, 1980	Resurrection	
October 3, 1980	Somewhere in Time	co-production with Rastar
December 5, 1980	Flash Gordon (Note: Co-owned by StudioCanal and MGM)	North American distribution excluding television only; produced by Dino De Laurentiis Corporation

== 1981 ==
Release Date	Title	Notes
January 1, 1981	The White Lions	U.S. theatrical distribution only; produced by Alan Landsburg Productions
1981	Invaders from the Deep (Note: Owned by ITV Studios)	U.S. distribution only; produced by ITC Entertainment; movie compilation of the television series Stingray
1981	Burned at the Stake	U.S. theatrical distribution only; produced by Alan Landsburg Productions
January 30, 1981	The Incredible Shrinking Woman	
March 6, 1981	All Night Long	
March 13, 1981	The Funhouse	distribution only; produced by Mace Neufeld Productions
April 10, 1981	Nighthawks	co-production with Martin Poll Productions and The Production Company
April 24, 1981	Beyond the Reef	North American distribution only; produced by Dino De Laurentiis Corporation
April 24, 1981	Cattle Annie and Little Britches (Note: Owned by MGM (via Orion Pictures))	North American theatrical distribution only; produced by Hemdale, Cattle Annie Films, Inc., King-Hitzig Productions and Monday Films
May 1, 1981	King of the Mountain (Note: Universal has licensed certain rights to this film to Lionsgate)	North American theatrical distribution only; produced by PolyGram Pictures
May 22, 1981	The Four Seasons	
May 22, 1981	Bustin' Loose	
May 22, 1981	The Legend of the Lone Ranger (Note: Owned by ITV Studios, with North American non-theatrical distribution rights currently licensed to Shout! Studios)	North American theatrical distribution with Associated Film Distribution only; produced by ITC Entertainment and Wrather Productions
June 26, 1981	The Great Muppet Caper (Note: Owned by Disney (via The Muppets Studio); Universal retains theatrical rights)	North American theatrical distribution with Associated Film Distribution only; produced by ITC Entertainment and Henson Associates
July 17, 1981	Endless Love	North American distribution excluding television only; produced by PolyGram Pictures
August 21, 1981	An American Werewolf in London	North American distribution excluding television only; produced by PolyGram Pictures and Lycanthrope Films Limited
August 21, 1981	Honky Tonk Freeway (Note: Owned by StudioCanal, with select North American non-theatrical distribution rights licensed to Lionsgate)	North American theatrical distribution with Associated Film Distribution Corporation only; produced by EMI Films
September 18, 1981	Continental Divide	co-production with Amblin Productions
September 18, 1981	Raggedy Man	
October 2, 1981	Zoot Suit	Inducted into the National Film Registry in 2019
October 23, 1981	Silence of the North	Canadian film; distribution only
October 30, 1981	Halloween II	North American distribution only; produced by Dino De Laurentiis Corporation
November 13, 1981	The Pursuit of D. B. Cooper	North American distribution excluding television only; produced by PolyGram Pictures
December 4, 1981	On Golden Pond (Note: Co-owned by ITV Studios, with North American home media and digital distribution rights currently licensed to Shout! Studios)	theatrical distribution only; produced by ITC Films and IPC Films; co-distributed by Associated Film Distribution Corporation in North America; Nominee of the Academy Award for Best Picture. Winner of the Golden Globe Award for Best Motion Picture - Drama
December 18, 1981	Ghost Story	
December 18, 1981	Heartbeeps	

== 1982 ==
Release Date	Title	Notes
February 12, 1982	The Border	co-production with Efer Productions and RKO Pictures
February 19, 1982	Barbarosa	North American theatrical distribution with Associated Film Distribution Corporation only; produced by ITC Films
March 5, 1982	Evil Under the Sun	North American theatrical distribution with Associated Film Distribution Corporation only; produced by EMI Films and Titan Productions
March 12, 1982	Missing	co-production with PolyGram Pictures; Nominee of the Academy Award for Best Picture. Nominee of the Golden Globe Award for Best Motion Picture - Drama.
April 2, 1982	A Little Sex	North American distribution only; produced by MTM Enterprises
April 2, 1982	Cat People	co-production with RKO Pictures
May 7, 1982	Death Valley	distribution only
May 14, 1982	Conan the Barbarian	North American distribution only; produced by Dino De Laurentiis Corporation
May 21, 1982	Dead Men Don't Wear Plaid	co-production with Aspen Film Society
June 11, 1982	E.T. the Extra-Terrestrial	co-production with Amblin Entertainment; Nominee of the Academy Award for Best Picture. Winner of the Golden Globe Award for Best Motion Picture – Drama. Inducted into the National Film Registry in 1994
June 25, 1982	The Thing	co-production with The Turman-Foster Company; Inducted into the National Film Registry in 2025
July 23, 1982	The Best Little Whorehouse in Texas	co-production with RKO Pictures and Miller-Milkis-Boyett Productions; Nominee of the Golden Globe Award for Best Motion Picture – Musical or Comedy
August 13, 1982	Fast Times at Ridgemont High	co-production with Refugee Films; Inducted into the National Film Registry in 2005
September 26, 1982	Moonlighting	U.S. distribution under Universal Classics only
October 22, 1982	Halloween III: Season of the Witch	North American distribution only; produced by Dino De Laurentiis Corporation
December 3, 1982	Frances	North American theatrical distribution with Associated Film Distribution Corporation only; produced by EMI Films and Brooksfilms
December 10, 1982	Sophie's Choice	theatrical distribution only; produced by ITC Entertainment; co-distributed by Associated Film Distribution Corporation in North America nominee of the Golden Globe Award for Best Motion Picture – Drama.
December 10, 1982	La Traviata	U.S. distribution under Universal Classics only
December 17, 1982	The Dark Crystal (Note: Owned by The Jim Henson Company with Shout! Studios handling distribution; Universal retains theatrical rights due to contractual obligations)	theatrical distribution only; produced by ITC Entertainment and Henson Associates; co-distributed by Associated Film Distribution Corporation in North America
December 17, 1982	Six Weeks	North American theatrical distribution only; produced by PolyGram Pictures

== 1983 ==
Release Date	Title	Notes
February 4, 1983	Videodrome	Canadian film; distribution only; produced by Filmplan International, Canadian Film Development Corporation and Famous Players
February 18, 1983	The Pirates of Penzance	co-production with Edward R. Pressman Productions
February 18, 1983	The Sting II	
February 1983	Second Thoughts	North American theatrical distribution with Associated Film Distribution Corporation only; produced by EMI Films and The Turman-Foster Company
March 4, 1983	Tender Mercies	North American theatrical distribution with Associated Film Distribution Corporation only; produced by EMI Films and Antron Media Productions; Nominee of the Academy Award for Best Picture. Nominee of the Golden Globe Award for Best Motion Picture – Drama.
March 23, 1983	Eddie Macon's Run	
March 25, 1983	Bad Boys	North American theatrical distribution with Associated Film Distribution Corporation only; produced by EMI Films
March 31, 1983	Monty Python's The Meaning of Life	British film; distribution only; produced by Celandine Films and The Monty Python Partnership
May 6, 1983	Doctor Detroit	co-production with Black Rhino Productions and The Brillstein Company
June 3, 1983	Psycho II	co-production with Oak Industries
July 1, 1983	Stroker Ace	North American theatrical, international home media and television distribution only; co-production with Warner Bros.
July 15, 1983	Puberty Blues	U.S. distribution under Universal Classics only
July 22, 1983	Jaws 3-D	co-production with Alan Landsburg Productions
July 29, 1983	Private School	co-production with Unity Pictures Corporation
August 12, 1983	Smokey and the Bandit Part 3	
August 19, 1983	Metalstorm: The Destruction of Jared-Syn	North American distribution only; produced by Albert Band International Productions
September 2, 1983	Merry Christmas, Mr. Lawrence (Note: Owned by HanWay Films, with U.S. distribution rights currently licensed to RLJE Films, which has sub-licensed to The Criterion Collection)	North American distribution only; produced by Recorded Picture Company
September 9, 1983	Nightmares	
September 15, 1983	Heat and Dust (Note: Owned by Cohen Media Group)	U.S. theatrical distribution under Universal Classics only; produced by Merchant Ivory Productions
September 21, 1983	Cross Creek	North American theatrical distribution with Associated Film Distribution only; produced by Thorn EMI Screen Entertainment
September 30, 1983	Going Berserk	co-production with Mutual Productions
September 30, 1983	The Lonely Lady	North American distribution only
September 30, 1983	Hanna K.	North American distribution only
October 21, 1983	Rumble Fish (Note: Co-owned by American Zoetrope)	distribution in North and Latin America, the U.K., Scandinavia, Spain and Japan only; produced by Zoetrope Studios
December 9, 1983	Scarface	co-production with Martin Bregman Productions
December 16, 1983	D.C. Cab	co-production with The Guber-Peters Company and RKO Pictures

== 1984 ==
Release Date	Title	Notes
January 27, 1984	The Lonely Guy	co-production with Aspen Film Society
February 17, 1984	Crackers	
February 1984	Slayground	North American theatrical distribution with Associated Film Distribution only; produced by Thorn EMI Films
March 2, 1984	Repo Man (Note: This film has since been transferred to Universal's Focus Features division)	distribution only; produced by Edge City
March 16, 1984	Tank	co-production with Lorimar Productions
April 6, 1984	Hard to Hold	
April 13, 1984	Iceman	
May 4, 1984	Sixteen Candles	co-production with Channel Productions
May 11, 1984	Firestarter	North American distribution and international theatrical distribution only; produced by Dino De Laurentiis Corporation
June 1, 1984	Streets of Fire	co-production with Hill-Gordon-Silver Productions and RKO Pictures
June 13, 1984	Under the Volcano (Note: Owned by Janus Films and the Criterion Collection)	North American distribution only; produced by Ithaca Enterprises
June 29, 1984	Conan the Destroyer	North American distribution and international theatrical distribution outside West Germany and Austria only; produced by the Dino De Laurentiis Corporation
July 13, 1984	The Last Starfighter	North American distribution excluding television only; produced by Lorimar Productions
July 20, 1984	One Deadly Summer	U.S. distribution only; produced by TF1
August 10, 1984	Cloak & Dagger	
September 21, 1984	All of Me (Note: Owned by Lionsgate)	North American theatrical distribution only; produced by Kings Road Productions
September 28, 1984	The Wild Life	
October 10, 1984	Comfort and Joy	North American distribution only; produced by Kings Road Productions
October 26, 1984	Terror in the Aisles	North American distribution only; produced by T.E.M. Programs International and Kaleidoscope Films Limited
December 14, 1984	Dune	North American distribution and international theatrical distribution outside Australia, New Zealand, France, West Germany, Austria and the Benelux only; produced by Dino De Laurentiis Corporation
December 14, 1984	Mass Appeal	distribution only; produced by Operation Cork Productions, The Turman-Foster Company and Jalem Productions
December 19, 1984	The River	

== 1985 ==
Release Date	Title	Notes
February 15, 1985	The Breakfast Club	co-production with A&M Films and Channel Productions; Inducted into the National Film Registry in 2016
February 22, 1985	Into the Night	co-production with Landis/Folsey Productions
March 8, 1985	Mask	
April 12, 1985	A Test of Love	North American distribution only; produced by Film Australia
April 26, 1985	Stick	
May 3, 1985	Gotcha!	co-production with Michael I. Levy Enterprises
May 22, 1985	Brewster's Millions	co-production with Lawrence Gordon Productions and Silver Pictures
May 31, 1985	Fletch	co-production with Douglas/Greisman Productions
July 3, 1985	UFOria	distribution only; produced by Melvin Simon Productions
July 3, 1985	Back to the Future	co-production with Amblin Entertainment; Nominee of the Golden Globe Award for Best Motion Picture – Musical or Comedy. Inducted into the National Film Registry in 2007
August 2, 1985	Weird Science	co-production with Hughes Entertainment and Silver Pictures
September 13, 1985	James Joyce's Women	British film; North American and U.K. distribution only; produced by The Rejoycing Company
September 20, 1985	Creator	North American theatrical distribution only; produced by Kings Road Productions
September 20, 1985	Morons from Outer Space (Note: Owned by MGM)	U.S. theatrical distribution only; produced by Thorn EMI Screen Entertainment
October 4, 1985	Dreamchild	U.S. theatrical distribution only; produced by Thorn EMI Screen Entertainment
October 18, 1985	The Holcroft Covenant	U.S. theatrical distribution only; produced by Thorn EMI Screen Entertainment
October 18, 1985	Wild Geese II	U.S. theatrical distribution only; produced by Thorn EMI Screen Entertainment
December 18, 1985	Brazil	North American distribution only; produced by Embassy International Pictures
December 20, 1985	Out of Africa	co-production with Mirage Enterprises; Winner of the Academy Award for Best Picture. Winner of the Golden Globe Award for Best Motion Picture – Drama.

== 1986 ==
Release Date	Title	Notes
January 31, 1986	The Best of Times	North American theatrical distribution only; produced by Kings Road Entertainment
March 26, 1986	The Money Pit	co-production with Amblin Entertainment
April 18, 1986	Legend	North American distribution only; produced by Embassy International Pictures
May 14, 1986	Sweet Liberty	
June 18, 1986	Legal Eagles	
July 2, 1986	Psycho III	
August 1, 1986	Howard the Duck	distribution only; produced by Lucasfilm, Ltd.
August 8, 1986	The Transformers: The Movie	U.S. Home Media distribution Only; Produced By Sunbow And Hasbro Limited
August 29, 1986	Bullies (Note: Owned by FilmRise)	U.S. distribution only; produced by Simcom Limited
September 12, 1986	'night, Mother	co-production with Blackbird Productions
October 3, 1986	Playing for Keeps	North American distribution only; produced by Miramax Films
October 10, 1986	Clockwise	North American theatrical distribution only; produced by Cannon Screen Entertainment
November 21, 1986	An American Tail	co-production with Amblin Entertainment and Sullivan Bluth Studios
December 25, 1986	Brighton Beach Memoirs	co-production with Rastar

== 1987 ==
Release Date	Title	Notes
April 10, 1987	The Secret of My Success	co-production with Rastar
May 1, 1987	The Allnighter	distribution only; produced by Aurora Productions
June 5, 1987	Harry and the Hendersons	co-production with Amblin Entertainment
June 26, 1987	Dragnet	co-production with Applied Action and The Brillstein Company
July 17, 1987	Jaws: The Revenge	
August 14, 1987	North Shore	distribution only; produced by the Finnegan-Pinchuk Company
August 21, 1987	Born in East L.A.	distribution only; produced by Clear Type Productions
September 18, 1987	Amazon Women on the Moon	distribution only
October 9, 1987	Hail! Hail! Rock 'n' Roll	distribution only; produced by Delilah Films
October 9, 1987	Three O'Clock High	
October 23, 1987	Prince of Darkness	North American distribution only; produced by Alive Films and Larry Franco Productions
October 27, 1987	Positive I.D.	distribution only; produced by Andersonfilm
November 6, 1987	Cry Freedom	co-production with Marble Arch Productions
November 13, 1987	Cross My Heart	
December 4, 1987	Walker	distribution only; produced by Edward R. Pressman Productions and In-Cine Compañía Industrial Cinematográfica
December 18, 1987	Batteries Not Included	co-production with Amblin Entertainment

== 1988 ==
Release Date	Title	Notes
February 5, 1988	The Serpent and the Rainbow	distribution only; produced by Keith Barish Productions
March 18, 1988	The Milagro Beanfield War	distribution only
March 25, 1988	Biloxi Blues	co-production with Rastar
April 22, 1988	Casual Sex?	distribution only
May 6, 1988	Shakedown	North American distribution only; co-production with Shapiro-Glickenhaus Entertainment
June 17, 1988	The Great Outdoors	co-production with Hughes Entertainment
July 8, 1988	Phantasm II	North American distribution only; produced by Spacegate Corporation
July 20, 1988	Midnight Run	co-production with City Light Films; Nominee of the Golden Globe Award for Best Motion Picture – Musical or Comedy
August 12, 1988	The Last Temptation of Christ	distribution outside Canada only; produced by Cineplex Odeon Films
September 9, 1988	Moon Over Parador	
September 23, 1988	Gorillas in the Mist	North American distribution only; co-production with Warner Bros. and The Guber-Peters Company; Nominee of the Golden Globe Award for Best Motion Picture – Drama.
October 14, 1988	Madame Sousatzka	U.S. distribution only; produced by Cineplex Odeon Films
November 4, 1988	They Live	North American distribution only; produced by Alive Films and Larry Franco Productions
November 18, 1988	The Land Before Time	co-production with Amblin Entertainment and Sullivan Bluth Studios
November 25, 1988	Missing Link	distribution only; produced by Kane International and Guber-Peters-Barris Productions
December 2, 1988	Watchers (Note: Owned by Quiver Distribution)	U.S. theatrical distribution only; produced by Concorde Pictures, Centaur Films, Rose & Ruby Productions and Canadian Entertainment Investors No. 2 and Company
December 9, 1988	Screwball Hotel	U.S. distribution only; produced by Avatar Film Corporation
December 9, 1988	Twins	
December 21, 1988	Talk Radio	U.S. distribution only; produced by Cineplex Odeon Films and Edward R. Pressman Productions

== 1989 ==
Release Date	Title	Notes
February 17, 1989	The 'Burbs	distribution outside U.S. television only; produced by Imagine Entertainment and Rollins-Morra-Brezner Productions
March 17, 1989	Fletch Lives	co-production with Douglas/Greisman Productions
April 7, 1989	The Dream Team	distribution only; produced by Imagine Entertainment
April 21, 1989	Field of Dreams (Note: Universal has since reclaimed international rights to this film from StudioCanal (the successor-in-interest to international rights holder Carolco Pictures) by 2003)	North American distribution only; produced by the Gordon Company; Inducted into the National Film Registry in 2017
April 28, 1989	K-9	distribution only; produced by the Gordon Company
June 2, 1989	Renegades	North American distribution only; produced by Morgan Creek Productions and Interscope Communications
June 30, 1989	Do the Right Thing	distribution only; produced by 40 Acres and A Mule Filmworks; Nominee of the Golden Globe Award for Best Motion Picture – Drama; Inducted into the National Film Registry in 1999
August 2, 1989	Parenthood	distribution only; produced by Imagine Entertainment
August 16, 1989	Uncle Buck	distribution only; produced by Hughes Entertainment
September 15, 1989	Sea of Love	
October 27, 1989	Dad	co-production with Amblin Entertainment
October 27, 1989	Shocker	North American distribution only; produced by Alive Films
November 22, 1989	Back to the Future Part II	co-production with Amblin Entertainment
December 15, 1989	The Wizard	North American, Australian and New Zealand distribution only; produced by Finnegan-Pinchuk Company
December 20, 1989	Born on the Fourth of July	distribution only; produced by Kitman Ho Productions and Ixtlan Productions; Nominee of the Academy Award for Best Picture; Winner of the Golden Globe Award for Best Motion Picture – Drama
December 22, 1989	Always	co-production with United Artists and Amblin Entertainment

== See also ==
- List of Focus Features films
- List of Universal Pictures theatrical animated feature films
- Universal Pictures
- Category:Lists of films by studio
