= List of Universal Pictures International films =

This is a list of International films distributed by Universal Pictures. This list includes local-language releases from countries such as Germany, the Netherlands, France and Russia. It does not include U.S.-produced films for these territories.

== 2000s ==
Release Date	Title	Country	Notes
May 17, 2000	The King's Daughters	France	distribution only; produced by Archipel 35
October 24, 2001	Gregoire Moulin vs. Humanity	France	distribution only; produced by LGM Productions, M6 Films, Rhône-Alpes Cinéma and SFP
February 20, 2002	Gangsters	France	distribution only; produced by A.J.O.Z. Films, LGM Productions, Cinétévé, France 3 Cinéma, Saga Film (I) and RTBF
October 10, 2002	Full Moon Party	Netherlands	studio credit and home media distribution only; produced by Nijenhuis & de Levita Film & TV and BBN; Theatrical distribution by Independent Films
March 13, 2003	Love to Love	Netherlands	studio credit and home media distribution only; produced by Nijenhuis & de Levita Film & TV and NCRV; Theatrical distribution by Independent Films
November 20, 2003	Pipo en de P-P-Parelridder	Netherlands	studio credit and home media distribution only; produced by Endemol and TROS; Theatrical distribution by Independent Films
December 11, 2003	Father's Affair	Netherlands	studio credit and home media distribution only; produced by 24fps Productions; Theatrical distribution by Independent Films
January 29, 2004	Hush Hush Baby	Netherlands	studio credit and home media distribution only; produced by Theorema Films and VARA; Theatrical distribution by Independent Films
January 29, 2004	Fighting Fish	Netherlands	distribution only; produced by Three Kings Produkties and Riverpark Film
February 12, 2004	Love Trap	Netherlands	distribution only; produced by PVPictures and TROS
September 30, 2004	Alice in Glamourland	Netherlands	studio credit and home media distribution only; produced by Nijenhuis & de Levita Film & TV and TROS; Theatrical distribution by Independent Films
December 16, 2004	Floris	Netherlands	studio credit and home media distribution only; produced by Nijenhuis & de Levita Film & TV and Katholieke Radio Omroep; Theatrical distribution by Independent Films
March 13, 2006	Het Woeden der Gehele Wereld	Netherlands	distribution only; produced by Nedfilm and TROS
May 24, 2006	Zidane: A 21st Century Portrait	France	distribution only; produced by Anna Lena Films
October 25, 2006	Elephant Tales	France	distribution only; produced by Myriad Pictures, Adelaide Production, Film Finance Corporation Australia, Studiocanal and Breakout Films
January 25, 2007	One Way	Germany	
October 31, 2007	Oviedo Express	Spain	Spanish distribution only; produced by Gona Cine y Televisión
November 23, 2007	Lessons in Chocolate	Italy	Italian distribution only; produced by Cattleya
August 15, 2008	Wild Child	United Kingdom; France	distribution only; produced by StudioCanal and Working Title Films
March 20, 2009	Different from Whom?	Italy	Italian distribution only; produced by Cattleya
September 17, 2009	The Storm	Netherlands	Benelux distribution only; produced by Nijenhuis & de Levita Film & TV and NCRV
October 23, 2009	Oggi sposi	Italy	distribution only; produced by Cattleya
December 18, 2009	Nikté	Mexico	Mexican distribution only
December 26, 2009	Black Lightning	Russia	Russian distribution with Focus Features International only; produced by Bazelevs Company

== 2010s ==
Release Date	Title	Country	Notes
January 20, 2010	Gainsbourg: A Heroic Life	France	French distribution only; co-production with Studio 37, France 2 Cinema, Lilou Films and Xilam Films
March 17, 2010	Heartbreaker	France	French co-distribution with Focus Features International only; co-production with Quad Films, Script Associes, Kinology and Chaocorp
June 17, 2010	Hanni & Nanni	Germany	distribution only; produced by UFA Cinema, Feine Filme and ZDF
October 29, 2010	Julia's Eyes	Spain	distribution in Spain, France and Latin America only; produced by DeAPlaneta, Rodar y Rodar and Antena 3 Films
November 4, 2010	The Coming Days	Germany	German and Austrian distribution only; produced by Badlands
November 26, 2010	The Woman of My Dreams	Italy	distribution only; produced by Cattleya
February 17, 2011	Jungle Child	Germany	German and Austrian distribution only; produced by UFA Cinema and Degeto Film
March 17, 2011	Office Romance. Our Time	Russia; Ukraine	Russian theatrical distribution only; produced by Kvartal 95 Studio and Leopolis
April 7, 2011	The PyraMMMid	Russia	Russian theatrical distribution only; produced by Leopolis
April 8, 2011	Some Say No	Italy	Italian distribution only; produced by Cattleya
August 24, 2011	You Will Be My Son	France	French distribution only; produced by Fidelite Films
December 14, 2011	Headwinds	France; Belgium	French distribution only; co-production with WY Productions and Artemis Productions
December 15, 2011	Woman in Love	Germany	German and Austrian distribution only; co-production with Film1 and Boje Buck Filmproduktion
March 8, 2012	The Fourth State	Germany	German and Austrian distribution only; produced by UFA Cinema, SevenPictures Film and Celluloid Dreams
September 7, 2012	Westgate Tango	Taiwan	Taiwanese theatrical distribution only; produced by WM Films
October 31, 2012	A Perfect Plan	France	French distribution only; co-production with Quad Productions
April 3, 2013	Love Is in the Air	France	French distribution only; co-production with Révérence and Thelma Films
September 27, 2013	Witching & Bitching	Spain; France	Spanish distribution only; produced by Film Factory Entertainment, Enrique Cerezo Producciones Cinematográficas S.A. and La Ferme! Productions
December 20, 2013	Moshi Monsters: The Movie	United Kingdom	distribution in the U.K., Ireland, Australia and New Zealand only; produced by Mind Candy and Spider Eye Productions
December 25, 2013	The Physician	Germany	German and Austrian distribution only; produced by UFA Cinema, Degeto Film and Beta Cinema
April 11, 2014	The Last Days on Mars	United Kingdom; Ireland	distribution in the U.K., Ireland, Australia and New Zealand only; produced by BFI, Irish Film Board, Qwerty Films and Fantastic Films
April 16, 2014	Babysitting	France	French and Latin American distribution only; produced by Other Angle Pictures, Axel Films, Madame Films, Cinéfrance 1888 and Good Lap Production
June 27, 2014	Mrs. Brown's Boys D'Movie	United Kingdom; Ireland	distribution in the U.K., Ireland, Australia and New Zealand only; produced by BBC Films, BocFlix, That's Nice Films and Penalty Kick Films
September 19, 2014	The Riot Club	United Kingdom; Ireland	U.K. and Irish distribution only; co-production with Blueprint Pictures, British Film Institute, Film4, HanWay Films and Pinewood Films
November 6, 2014	Labyrinth of Lies	Germany	German and Austrian distribution only;
December 4, 2014	Alles ist Liebe	Germany	German and Austrian distribution only; co-production with Henning Ferber Filmproduktions and Film1
January 14, 2015	Sous X	France	French distribution only; produced by Pan-Européenne
April 9, 2015	Uno anzi due	Italy	Italian distribution only; co-production with The Space Movies, DAP Italy, and SICME
May 3, 2015	You Can't Save Yourself Alone	Italy	Italian distribution only; produced by Indiana Production and Wildside
May 3, 2015	Dukhless 2	Russia	Russian theatrical distribution only; produced by Art Pictures Studio
July 11, 2015	Tag	Japan	Japanese co-distribution with Shochiku only; produced by Asmik Ace and Sedic Deux Inc.
August 26, 2015	A Perfect Day	Spain	Spanish distribution only; produced by Mediapro and Reposado Producciones
October 23, 2015	My Big Night	Spain	Spanish distribution only; produced by Enrique Cerezo PC and Telefónica Studios
November 20, 2015	Spanish Affair 2	Spain	Spanish distribution only; produced by LaZona Films, Kowalski Films and Telecinco Cinema
December 2, 2015	Babysitting 2	France	French distribution only; produced by Madame Films and Axel Films
February 6, 2016	Dad's Army	United Kingdom	distribution only; produced by DJ Films
March 17, 2016	KikoRiki. Legend of the Golden Dragon	Russia	Russian distribution only; produced by Petersburg, Riki, Art Pictures Group and Cinema Fund Russia
April 22, 2016	Toro	Spain; France	Spanish distribution only; produced by Apaches Entertainment, Atresmedia Cine, Film Factory Entertainment, Zircozine, Escándalo Films, Maestranza Films and Ran Entertainment
November 16, 2016	Iris	France	French distribution only; produced by Wy Productions and France 2 Cinema
November 24, 2016	Panfilov's 28 Men	Russia	Russian theatrical distribution only; produced by Lybian Palette
November 25, 2016	The Queen of Spain	Spain	Spanish distribution only; Fernando Trueba PC and Atresmedia Cine
December 29, 2016	The Snow Queen 3: Fire and Ice	Russia	Russian theatrical distribution only; produced by Wizart Animation
May 20, 2017	Fortunata	Italy	Italian distribution only; produced by Indigo Film and HT Film
July 19, 2017	La Colle	France	French distribution only; produced by Neuf Janvier Productions, Other Angle Pictures, Récifilms and Nexus Factory
October 27, 2017	Marrowbone	Spain	Spanish distribution only; produced by Mediaset España, Telecinco Cinema and Movistar+
November 1, 2017	Daddy Cool |	France	French distribution only; produced by Les Improductibles
December 1, 2017	Perfect Strangers	Spain	Spanish distribution only; produced by Telecinco Cinema
March 8, 2018	I Am Losing Weight	Russia	Russian theatrical distribution only; produced by Film Studio "Droog Drooga" and Versus Pictures
April 6, 2018	Champions	Spain	Spanish distribution only; produced by Películas Pendelton, Rey de Babia AIE, Morena Films and Telefónica Studios
April 24, 2018	Loro 1 |	Italy; France	Italian distribution with Focus Features only; produced by Indigo Film, Pathé, France 2 Cinema, OCS, France Televisions, Direzione Generale Cinema, Regione Lazio and Sardegna Film Commission
May 4, 2018	Loro 2 |	Italy; France	Italian distribution with Focus Features only; produced by Indigo Film, Pathé, France 2 Cinema, OCS, France Televisions, Direzione Generale Cinema, Regione Lazio and Sardegna Film Commission
December 27, 2018	The Legend of the Christmas Witch	Italy; Spain	Italian theatrical distribution only; produced by Lucky Red, Morena Films and Rai Cinema
January 27, 2019	Saving Leningrad	Russia	Russian theatrical distribution only; produced by Studio AVK, Algous studio, All Media Company, and NTV
May 8, 2019	The Shiny Shrimps	France	French distribution only; produced by Les Improductibles and Kaly Productions
November 15, 2019	Hell Girl	Japan	Japanese co-distribution with GAGA only; co-production with W Field

== 2020s ==
Release Date	Title	Country	Notes
October 2, 2020	My Heart Goes Boom!	Spain	Spanish distribution only
December 18, 2020	Sky High	Spain	Spanish distribution only; produced by Vaca Films
June 30, 2021	Presidents	France	French distribution only; produced by Cine
December 3, 2021	The Perfect Family	Spain	Spanish distribution only; co-production with Lazona Producciones, Atresmedia Cine and The Snake Films AIE
April 1, 2022	Monkey Business	Spain	Spanish distribution only; co-production with Movistar Plus+, El Niño Producciones, Zircocine and La Canica Films
July 22, 2022	A Boyfriend for My Wife	Spain	Spanish distribution only; co-production with Arcadia Motion Pictures and Athos Pictures
September 2, 2022	The Final Game	Spain; Andorra	Spanish distribution only; produced by Playtime Movies
November 4, 2022	Staring at Strangers	Spain; Belgium	Spanish distribution only; co-production with Tornasol
April 21, 2023	One Hell of a Holiday!	Spain	Spanish distribution only; co-production with Telecinco Cinema, Quexito Films, Aliwood and Creced y Multiplicaos AIE
April 28, 2023	Fatum	Spain; France	Spanish distribution only; produced by Vaca Films and Playtime Productions
August 18, 2023	Championext	Spain	Spanish distribution only; produced by Películas Pendelton, Rey de Babia AIE, Morena Films and Telefónica Studios
September 29, 2023	The Tenderness	Spain; Dominican Republic	Spanish distribution only; produced by Priss&Batty, La Ternura la película AIE and Bahía Carey
November 10, 2023	Just One Small Favor	Spain	Spanish distribution only; produced by Zeta Cinema, Pumuky Films and Atresmedia Cine
December 1, 2023	A Moroccan Affair	Spain	Spanish distribution only; produced by Telecinco Cinema
January 19, 2024	The Courier	Spain; Belgium; France	Spanish distribution only; produced by Vaca Films, Panache Productions and La Compagnie Cinématographique
May 17, 2024	Free Falling	Spain	Spanish distribution only; produced by Colosé Producciones, Corte y Confección de películas, Ejercicios de Equilibrio, Marrowbone and Suspense Entertainment
October 25, 2024	The Wailing	Spain; Argentina; France	Spanish distribution only; produced by Caballo Films, Setembro Cine, Tandem Films, Tarea Fina, Noodles Productions and El llanto AIE
November 8, 2024	Samana Sunrise	Spain; Dominican Republic	Spanish distribution only; produced by Ron Vino y Miel AIE, A name like this, Materia Cinema, Quexito Films and Federation Spain
March 14, 2025	Wolfgang	Spain	Spanish distribution only; produced by Nostromo Pictures and Telecinco Cinema
September 18, 2025	Aztec Batman: Clash of Empires	Mexico	Mexican distribution only with Cinépolis Distribución; produced by Warner Bros. Animation, Ánima, DC Entertainment, Particular Crowd and Chatrone
September 26, 2025	The Gentleman	Spain	Spanish distribution only
October 3, 2025	Sofia's Suspicion	Spain; Germany	Spanish distribution only; produced by José Frade Producciones Cinematográficas
October 28, 2025	L'Homme qui rétrécit	France; Belgium	French distribution only; co-production with TF1 Films Production, Pitchipoï Productions, Amazon MGM Studios and Umedia
February 13, 2026	Divine Punishment	Spain Portugal	Spanish distribution only
October 16, 2026	La maleta	Spain	Spanish distribution only; co-production with Telecinco Cinema and Zeta Cinema

== See also ==
- List of United International Pictures films
