= List of Universal Pictures films (1970–1979) =

This is a list of films produced or distributed by Universal Pictures in 1970–1979, founded in 1912 as the Universal Film Manufacturing Company. It is the main motion picture production and distribution arm of Universal Studios, a subsidiary of the NBCUniversal division of Comcast.

== 1970 ==
Release date	Title	Notes
January 27, 1970	A Time in the Sun	Sweden: American distribution
February 13, 1970	Story of a Woman	co-production with Westward Films
March 6, 1970	Skullduggery	
March 19, 1970	Airport	Nominee for the Academy Award for Best Picture co-production with Ross Hunter Productions
April 8, 1970	Colossus: The Forbin Project	
April 22, 1970	The Cockeyed Cowboys of Calico County	
May 6, 1970	In Search of Gregory	
June 15, 1970	Pufnstuf	co-production with Sid & Marty Krofft Pictures
June 16, 1970	Two Mules for Sister Sara	co-production with The Malpaso Company
August 10, 1970	Diary of a Mad Housewife	co-production with Frank Perry Films Inc.
August 16, 1970	Dreams of Glass	
November 25, 1970	The Act of the Heart	co-production with Quest Film Productions
December 16, 1970	Puzzle of a Downfall Child	co-production with Jerrold Schatzberg Productions and Newman-Foreman Company
December 21, 1970	I Love My Wife	co-production with Wolper Pictures Ltd.
December 30, 1970	A Very Curious Girl	French

== 1971 ==
Release date	Title	Notes
February 12, 1971	Raid on Rommel	Made for US television
February 1971	How to Frame a Figg	
March 12, 1971	The Andromeda Strain	
March 28, 1971	Taking Off	
May 12, 1971	Red Sky at Morning	
May 19, 1971	The Beguiled	co-production with The Malpaso Company
June 1, 1971	One More Train to Rob	
June 9, 1971	They Might Be Giants	co-production with Newman-Foreman Company
July 7, 1971	Two-Lane Blacktop	co-production with Michael Laughlin Enterprises; Inducted into the National Film Registry in 2012
July 17, 1971	The Hired Hand	co-production with The Pando Company
September 29, 1971	The Last Movie	U.S. theatrical distribution only; produced by Alta-Light
October 13, 1971	Shoot Out	
October 28, 1971	The Railway Children (Note: Owned by StudioCanal)	British: U.S. theatrical distribution only; produced by EMI Films
November 12, 1971	Play Misty for Me	co-production with The Malpaso Company
December 17, 1971	Sometimes a Great Notion	co-production with Newman-Foreman Company
December 22, 1971	Minnie and Moskowitz	co-production with Faces Music
December 22, 1971	Mary, Queen of Scots	Nominee of the Golden Globe Award for Best Motion Picture – Drama.

== 1972 ==
Release date	Title	Notes
March 10, 1972	Silent Running	
March 15, 1972	Slaughterhouse-Five	
March 23, 1972	The Ra Expeditions	U.S. distribution only
March 29, 1972	Twins of Evil (Note: Owned by ITV Studios)	British: U.S. distribution only; produced by The Rank Organisation and Hammer Film Productions
June 14, 1972	The Great Northfield Minnesota Raid	co-production with Robertson and Associates
June 21, 1972	The Groundstar Conspiracy	co-production with Hal Roach International
June 21, 1972	Frenzy	Nominee of the Golden Globe Award for Best Motion Picture – Drama.
July 13, 1972	Hands of the Ripper	British: U.S. distribution only; produced by The Rank Organisation and Hammer Film Productions
July 18, 1972	Follow Me!	
July 19, 1972	Joe Kidd	co-production with The Malpaso Company
October 13, 1972	You'll Like My Mother	co-production with BCP
October 19, 1972	Play It as It Lays	co-production with F.P. Films
October 27, 1972	Ulzana's Raid	co-production with De Haven Productions and The Associates & Aldrich Company
November 1972	Limbo	co-production with The Filmkers Group
December 17, 1972	Pete 'n' Tillie	
December 22, 1972	Trick Baby	

== 1973 ==
Release date	Title	Notes
March 18, 1973	Two People	co-production with The Filmakers Group
April 6, 1973	High Plains Drifter	co-production with The Malpaso Company
April 18, 1973	Bequest to the Nation	British: co-production with Hal Wallis Productions
May 1, 1973	Guns of a Stranger	co-production with Marty Robbins Enterprises
June 20, 1973	Showdown	
May 16, 1973	The Day of the Jackal	Nominee of the Golden Globe Award for Best Motion Picture – Drama; British/French: co-production with Warwick Film Productions
May 18, 1973	SSSSSSS	co-production with The Zanuck/Brown Company
August 1, 1973	The Naked Ape	co-production with Jennings Lang and Playboy Enterprises
August 11, 1973	American Graffiti	co-production with Lucasfilm and The Coppola Company; Nominee of the Academy Award for Best Picture. Winner of the Golden Globe Award for Best Motion Picture – Musical or Comedy; Inducted into the National Film Registry in 1995
August 15, 1973	Jesus Christ Superstar	Nominee of the Golden Globe Award for Best Motion Picture – Musical or Comedy.
October 19, 1973	Charley Varrick	
November 14, 1973	The Don Is Dead	
November 16, 1973	Breezy	co-production with The Malpaso Company
November 23, 1973	The Boy Who Cried Werewolf	co-production with Pacific Bay Entertainment and RKF
December 19, 1973	Willie Dynamite	co-production with The Zanuck/Brown Company
December 25, 1973	The Sting	Winner of the Academy Award for Best Picture co-production with The Zanuck/Brown Company; Inducted into the National Film Registry in 2005
December 1973	That Man Bolt	

== 1974 ==
Release date	Title	Notes
March 16, 1974	The Midnight Man	
April 5, 1974	The Sugarland Express	
May 17, 1974	The Black Windmill	British
July 17, 1974	My Name is Nobody	U.S. theatrical distribution only
August 21, 1974	Newman's Law	
August 22, 1974	The Girl from Petrovka	co-production with The Zanuck/Brown Company
October 18, 1974	Janis	
October 18, 1974	Airport 1975	
November 15, 1974	Earthquake	Nominee of the Golden Globe Award for Best Motion Picture – Drama. co-production with The Filmakers Group
December 18, 1974	The Front Page	Nominee of the Golden Globe Award for Best Motion Picture – Musical or Comedy.

== 1975 ==
Release date	Title	Notes
March 13, 1975	The Great Waldo Pepper	
March 28, 1975	Homo Eroticus	Italy: U.S. theatrical distribution only
May 21, 1975	The Eiger Sanction	co-production with The Malpaso Company (uncredited)
June 20, 1975	Jaws	Nominee of the Academy Award for Best Picture. Nominee of the Golden Globe Award for Best Motion Picture – Drama. co-production with The Zanuck/Brown Company; Inducted into the National Film Registry in 2001
October 8, 1975	Sidecar Racers	
November 1975	Rooster Cogburn	
November 14, 1975	The Other Side of the Mountain	co-production with Filmways
December 7, 1975	Special Section	French: U.S. theatrical distribution only
December 25, 1975	The Hindenburg	

== 1976 ==
Release date	Title	Notes
January 1976	Jim the World's Greatest	
February 11, 1976	Gable and Lombard	
March 31, 1976	W.C. Fields and Me	
April 9, 1976	Family Plot	
April 22, 1976	Mustang Country	
June 18, 1976	Midway	co-production with The Mirisch Corporation
July 16, 1976	The Bingo Long Traveling All-Stars & Motor Kings	co-production with Motown Productions
July 29, 1976	Swashbuckler	
August 1976	The Bawdy Adventures of Tom Jones	British
October 22, 1976	Car Wash	
October 24, 1976	The Seven-Per-Cent Solution	
November 4, 1976	The Slipper and the Rose (Note: Owned by Paradine Co-Productions with U.S. distribution rights currently licensed to Shout! Studios (via Westchester Films))	North American theatrical distribution only; produced by David Paradine Productions
November 12, 1976	Two-Minute Warning	co-production with Filmways

== 1977 ==
Release date	Title	Notes
February 11, 1977	Scott Joplin	co-productions with Motown Productions
February 11, 1977	Fellini's Casanova	Italian: U.S. distribution only; produced by Produzioni Europee Associate
February 11, 1977	The Sentinel	
February 25, 1977	Slap Shot	co-production with Pan Arts and Kings Road Productions
March 25, 1977	Airport '77	
May 13, 1977	The Car	co-production with Hollywood Road Films
May 27, 1977	Smokey and the Bandit	co-production with Rastar
May 1977	Forever Young, Forever Free	U.S. distribution only; produced by Lollipop Productions (Pty) and Film Trust
June 10, 1977	Rollercoaster	
June 24, 1977	Sorcerer (Note: U.S. distribution rights currently split between Paramount for theatrical, Universal Television for television and Warner Bros. Home Entertainment for home video and streaming)	co-production with Paramount Pictures and Film Properties International N.V.
July 15, 1977	MacArthur	
July 15, 1977	The Last Remake of Beau Geste	
November 4, 1977	Which Way Is Up?	
November 17, 1977	Heroes	
December 23, 1977	The Choirboys	North American distribution only; produced by Lorimar Productions

== 1978 ==
Release date	Title	Notes
January 6, 1978	September 30, 1955	
January 18, 1978	Checkered Flag or Crash	U.S. distribution only
February 10, 1978	The Other Side of the Mountain Part 2	co-production with Filmways
February 10, 1978	Blue Collar	co-production with TAT Communications Company
February 1978	Skateboard	U.S. and U.K. theatrical distribution only; produced by Blum Group
March 10, 1978	Gray Lady Down	co-production with The Mirisch Corporation
March 15, 1978	House Calls (Note: This film has since been transferred to Universal's Focus Features division)	
April 20, 1978	FM	
April 21, 1978	I Wanna Hold Your Hand	
April 21, 1978	Almost Summer	co-production with Motown Productions
May 12, 1978	Nunzio	
May 12, 1978	The Greek Tycoon	co-production with ABKCO Films
June 16, 1978	Jaws 2	co-production with Zanuck/Brown Company
July 21, 1978	Sgt. Pepper's Lonely Hearts Club Band	North American distribution only; produced by Robert Stigwood Organisation
July 28, 1978	Animal House	Inducted into the National Film Registry in 2001
July 28, 1978	Five Days from Home	U.S. distribution only
September 22, 1978	Paradise Alley	
October 6, 1978	The Big Fix	
October 24, 1978	The Wiz	co-production with Motown Productions
November 2, 1978	Caravans	U.S. distribution only; produced by FIDCI
November 22, 1978	Same Time, Next Year	co-production with The Mirisch Corporation
December 8, 1978	The Brink's Job	North American distribution only; produced by Dino De Laurentiis Company (uncredited)
December 22, 1978	Moment by Moment	co-production with RSO Films

== 1979 ==
Release date	Title	Notes
1979	Streets of Hong Kong	U.S. distribution only
February 23, 1979	The Deer Hunter	Winner of the Academy Award for Best Picture; Nominee of the Golden Globe Award for Best Motion Picture - Drama. North American distribution only; produced by EMI Films; Inducted into the National Film Registry in 1996
March 30, 1979	Buck Rogers in the 25th Century	
May 4, 1979	Fast Charlie... the Moonbeam Rider	
May 18, 1979	Battlestar Galactica	modified version released theatrically of pilot film for 1978 ABC-TV series
June 8, 1979	The Promise	
June 15, 1979	Walk Proud	
June 22, 1979	The Muppet Movie (Note: Owned by Disney (via The Muppets Studio); Universal retains theatrical rights)	North American theatrical distribution with Associated Film Distribution only; produced by ITC Entertainment and Henson Associates; Inducted into the National Film Registry in 2009
July 13, 1979	Dracula	co-production with The Mirisch Corporation
August 3, 1979	More American Graffiti	co-production with Lucasfilm
August 17, 1979	Monty Python's Life of Brian	British film; distribution only; produced by HandMade Films and Python (Monty) Pictures
August 17, 1979	The Concorde ... Airport '79	
August 17, 1979	The Prisoner of Zenda	co-production with The Mirisch Corporation
August 17, 1979	The Seduction of Joe Tynan	
September 14, 1979	The Legacy	North American distribution only; produced by Pethurst Ltd. and Turman-Foster Company
September 19, 1979	Yanks (Note: International rights co-owned by MGM (via United Artists))	North American distribution only; produced by C.I.P. Filmproduktion
November 2, 1979	Running	U.S. distribution only; produced by CFDC
December 14, 1979	1941	North American theatrical and worldwide home video distribution only; co-production with Columbia Pictures and A-Team
December 14, 1979	The Jerk	co-production with Aspen Film Society
December 21, 1979	The Electric Horseman	international theatrical and worldwide home video distribution only; co-production with Columbia Pictures, Rastar Productions and Wildwood Productions

== See also ==
- List of Focus Features films
- List of Universal Pictures theatrical animated feature films
- Universal Pictures
- Category:Lists of films by studio
