= Sandrew Metronome =

Scandinavian film distribution company

Sandrew Metronome is a Scandinavian film distribution company formed in the 1990s. It was one of the biggest distributor companies in the Nordic countries. Sandrew Metronome was established by the Swedish company Sandrews and the Danish Metronome. Later the Norwegian media company Schibsted acquired Metronome and became joint owner with Sandrews. Schibsted gained sole ownership in 2006, but later divested its holdings of Sandrew Metronome to a group of investors and its former CEO in 2013.

Between 2005 and 2007 Sandrew Metronome sold its cinemas. In 2011 the company ceased its theatrical distribution operations leaving it with only the DVD distribution.

Sandrew Metronome was for decades one of the leading Scandinavian majors. Historically, revenue was generated from the exploitation of its content through traditional distribution platforms, including theatrical distribution, home entertainment and television. Sandrew Metronome also owned movie theatres in Sweden, Denmark and Finland with the No. 2 position in the Nordics.

For several years, Sandrew Metronome was the Nordic distributor for films by Warner Bros. and had also acquired the Nordic rights to films from Focus Features, Miramax, Pathé, and Lionsgate.

The business has since then been repositioned to having a sharp focus on exploitation of and investment in entertainment content for digital distribution platforms.

Sandrew Metronome holds a broad collection of valuable intellectual property and commercially successful and critically acclaimed entertainment content, such as movies, TV series and music catalogue rights. In the movie catalogue are, among others, the following award-winning titles: Der Untergang, The Queen, Lost In Translation, The Phantom Of The Opera, and Volver.
