= Mirage Enterprises =

American film production company

Mirage Enterprises, Inc. was an American film production company founded by director and producer Sydney Pollack in 1985.

== History ==
Sydney Pollack was known for being a director and occasional actor. He began producing his own films in the 1970s, then started producing projects for other directors as well. He began his Mirage Enterprises production company in 1985, right before the release of Out of Africa. A pilot, Pollack named the studio after an airplane. He added director Anthony Minghella as partner in 2001.

Among the films Mirage produced were The Fabulous Baker Boys (1989), Sense and Sensibility (1995), Sliding Doors (1998), The Talented Mr. Ripley (1999), Iris (2001), and Cold Mountain (2003).

By the time of Pollack's death in 2008, Time magazine noted he had become "a much more prolific producer, with the pictures he made through his Mirage company tending to be smaller in scale, more eccentric, more personal than his studio pictures had been and he enjoyed godfathering them."
