= List of Focus Features films =

This is a list of films produced and/or distributed by Focus Features that also includes its former predecessors USA Films and Universal Focus, the arthouse motion picture production/distribution arm of NBCUniversal, a division of Comcast.

== Released ==
=== USA Films ===
Release date	Title	Notes
August 27, 1999	The Muse	acquired by October Films
September 10, 1999	Black Cat, White Cat	acquired by October Films; Nominated - Golden Lion; Nominated - Goya Award for Best European Film
September 17, 1999	Sugar Town	acquired by October Films; North American distribution only Nominated - Independent Spirit Award for Best Feature
September 24, 1999	Lucie Aubrac	acquired by October Films distribution in the U.S. and English-speaking Canada only Nominated - BAFTA Award for Best Film Not in the English Language; Nominated - Golden Bear
October 1, 1999	Plunkett & Macleane	produced by Gramercy Pictures and Working Title Films
November 5, 1999	Rosetta	co-acquired by October Films; U.S. distribution only Palme d'Or; Nominated - European Film Award for Best Film; Nominated - Independent Spirit Award for Best Foreign Film
November 19, 1999	Being John Malkovich	produced by Gramercy Pictures and Propaganda Films; GLAAD Media Award for Outstanding Film - Wide Release; Satellite Award for Best Film - Musical or Comedy; Saturn Award for Best Fantasy Film; Nominated - Bodil Award for Best American Film; Nominated - Critics' Choice Movie Award for Best Picture; Nominated - César Award for Best Foreign Film; Nominated - Golden Globe Award for Best Motion Picture - Musical or Comedy
November 24, 1999	Ride with the Devil	produced by Good Machine
December 15, 1999	Topsy-Turvy	acquired by October Films; North American, Australian and New Zealand distribution only Nominated - BAFTA Award for Outstanding British Film; Nominated - Golden Lion; Nominated - Independent Spirit Award for Best Foreign Film
January 21, 2000	Rear Window	re-release Nominated - BAFTA Award for Best Film; Nominated - Golden Lion
January 21, 2000	A Map of the World	
February 18, 2000	Pitch Black	produced by PolyGram Filmed Entertainment and Gramercy Pictures
March 3, 2000	Agnes Browne	produced by October Films distribution in North and Latin America, the U.K., Ireland, Australia, New Zealand, Italy, the Benelux and Scandinavia only
March 10, 2000	Condo Painting	produced by October Films
March 24, 2000	Waking the Dead	produced by PolyGram Filmed Entertainment and Gramercy Pictures
April 14, 2000	Where the Money Is	produced by PolyGram Filmed Entertainment and Gramercy Pictures
April 28, 2000	The Idiots	acquired by October Films; Nominated - Bodil Award for Best Danish Film; Nominated - Palme d'Or
May 5, 2000	Up at the Villa	produced by October Films; North and Latin American, U.K., Irish, French, German, Austrian and Spanish distribution only
May 26, 2000	Joe Gould's Secret	produced by October Films
June 21, 2000	Boricua's Bond	produced by October Films
July 7, 2000	Blood Simple	re-release Grand Jury Prize Dramatic; Nominated - Independent Spirit Award for Best Feature
July 28, 2000	Wonderland	produced by PolyGram Filmed Entertainment and Universal Pictures; Nominated - BAFTA Award for Outstanding British Film; Nominated - Palme d'Or
August 4, 2000	Mad About Mambo	produced by Gramercy Pictures
August 30, 2000	Alice and Martin	acquired by October Films; North American distribution only
September 8, 2000	Nurse Betty	produced by Gramercy Pictures; North and Latin American, Australian, New Zealand, Italian and Japanese distribution only Satellite Award for Best Film - Musical or Comedy; Nominated - Palme d'Or
October 20, 2000	A Room for Romeo Brass	co-acquired by October Films; U.S. distribution only
October 20, 2000	Cherry Falls	
December 27, 2000	Traffic	North American distribution only Satellite Award for Best Film - Drama; Nominated - Academy Award for Best Picture; Nominated - Bodil Award for Best American Film; Nominated - Golden Bear; Nominated - Golden Globe Award for Best Motion Picture - Drama; Nominated - Saturn Award for Best Action/Adventure/Thriller Film
March 2, 2001	Series 7: The Contenders	co-acquired by October Films; North American distribution only
March 9, 2001	In the Mood for Love	North American distribution only César Award for Best Foreign Film; Nominated - BAFTA Award for Best Film Not in the English Language; Nominated - Hong Kong Film Award for Best Film; Nominated - Palme d'Or
April 27, 2001	One Night at McCool's	produced by October Films
May 25, 2001	Bloody Angels	U.S. distribution only
June 8, 2001	Whatever Happened to Harold Smith?	produced by October Films
July 27, 2001	Wet Hot American Summer	distribution only
August 10, 2001	Session 9	produced by October Films
August 24, 2001	Maybe Baby	North American distribution only
November 2, 2001	The Man Who Wasn't There	produced by Gramercy Pictures, Good Machine and Working Title Films; Nominated - Golden Globe for Best Motion Picture - Drama; Nominated - Palme d'Or
November 20, 2001	Prancer Returns	direct-to-video film
January 4, 2002	Gosford Park	BAFTA Award for Outstanding British Film; Nominated - Academy Award for Best Picture; Nominated - César Award for Best Film from the European Union; Nominated - Golden Globe Award for Best Motion Picture - Musical or Comedy; Nominated - Satellite Award for Best Film - Musical or Comedy
January 18, 2002	The Kid Stays in the Picture	credited as Focus Features on home video releases Satellite Award for Best Documentary Film; Nominated - Critics' Choice Award for Best Documentary Feature
February 22, 2002	Monsoon Wedding	North American distribution only Golden Lion; Nominated - BAFTA Award for Best Film Not in the English Language; Nominated - Critics' Choice Movie Award for Best Foreign Language Film; Nominated - European Film Award for Best Non-European Film; Nominated - Golden Globe Award for Best Foreign Language Film; Nominated - Satellite Award for Best Foreign Language Film
July 12, 2002	Never Again	credited as Focus Features on home video releases

=== Universal Focus ===
Release date	Film title	Notes
October 13, 2000	Billy Elliot	co-production with StudioCanal, Working Title Films and BBC Films; BAFTA Award for Outstanding British Film; GLAAD Media Award for Outstanding Film - Wide Release; Japan Academy Film Prize for Outstanding Foreign Language Film; Nominated - BAFTA Award for Best Film; Nominated - César Award for Best Foreign Film; Nominated - David di Donatello for Best Foreign Film; Nominated - European Film Award for Best Film; Nominated - Golden Globe Award for Best Motion Picture - Drama; Nominated - Goya Award for Best European Film; Nominated - Satellite Award for Best Film - Drama
October 27, 2000	Loving Jezebel	co-production with Shooting Gallery
March 2, 2001	The Caveman's Valentine	co-production with Franchise Pictures and Jersey Shore
April 6, 2001	Beautiful Creatures	co-production with DNA Films
April 27, 2001	Rat	co-production with The Jim Henson Company
May 4, 2001	The Long Run	
May 4, 2001	Pavilion of Women	
May 25, 2001	The Man Who Cried	co-production with StudioCanal and Working Title Films
October 12, 2001	Mulholland Drive	original acquisition; produced by Les Films Alain Sarde, Asymmetrical Productions, Babbo Inc., StudioCanal and The Picture Factory; distributed in the U.S. by Universal Pictures; Bodil Award for Best American Film; César Award for Best Foreign Film; Nominated - Golden Globe Award for Best Motion Picture - Drama; Nominated - Palme d'Or; Nominated - Saturn Award for Best Action/Adventure/Thriller Film
January 11, 2002	Brotherhood of the Wolf	original acquisition; produced by StudioCanal and Davis Films; distributed in the U.S. by Universal Pictures
March 15, 2002	Harrison's Flowers	original acquisition; produced by StudioCanal; distributed in the U.S. by Universal Pictures

=== 2000s ===
Release date	Film title	Notes
August 16, 2002	Possession	North American distribution only; co-production with Warner Bros. Pictures; first Focus Features film; credited as USA Films on international releases
September 6, 2002	8 Women	U.S. distribution only; produced by Canal+ National Board of Review Award for Best Foreign Language Film; Nominated - César Award for Best Film; Nominated - European Film Award for Best Film; Nominated - GLAAD Media Award for Outstanding Film - Limited Release; Nominated - Golden Bear
October 11, 2002	Ash Wednesday	co-production with IFC Productions and Marlboro Road Gang Productions
November 8, 2002	Far from Heaven	distribution in North America, the U.K., Ireland, Australia, New Zealand and South Africa only; co-production with Vulcan Productions, Section Eight Productions and Killer Films; Independent Spirit Award for Best Film; Nominated - Critics' Choice Movie Award for Best Picture; Nominated - GLAAD Media Award for Outstanding Film - Wide Release
November 27, 2002	They	international distribution outside Italy only; co-production with Dimension Films and Radar Pictures
December 25, 2002	The Pianist	U.S., Australian, New Zealand and South African distribution only; produced by StudioCanal, Babelsberg Studio, Les Films Alain Sarde, RP Productions, Heritage Films and Canal+ BAFTA Award for Best Film; César Award for Best Film; David di Donatello for Best Foreign Film; Goya Award for Best European Film; Japan Academy Film Prize for Outstanding Foreign Language Film; Palme d'Or; Polish Academy Award for Best Film; Nominated - Academy Award for Best Picture; Nominated - European Film Award for Best Film; Nominated - Golden Globe Award for Best Motion Picture - Drama
January 10, 2003	Moonlight Mile	Continental European distribution only; produced by Hyde Park Entertainment
February 7, 2003	Deliver Us from Eva	
April 4, 2003	The Guys	
May 9, 2003	The Shape of Things	distribution outside France only; co-production with StudioCanal and Working Title Films
July 2, 2003	Swimming Pool	U.S. distribution only; produced by France 3Cinéma and Celluloid Dreams; Nominated - Critics' Choice Movie Award for Best Foreign Language Film; Nominated - European Film Award for Best Film
October 3, 2003	Lost in Translation	distribution only; produced by American Zoetrope and Elemental Pictures; César Award for Best Foreign Film; Golden Globe Award for Best Motion Picture - Musical or Comedy; Independent Spirit Award for Best Film; Nominated - Academy Award for Best Picture; Nominated - BAFTA Award for Best Film; Nominated - Critics' Choice Movie Award for Best Picture; Nominated - David di Donatello for Best Foreign Film
October 3, 2003	Out of Time	distribution in Latin America, the CIS, the Middle East, Israel, Indonesia, Japan, Thailand and Europe excluding France only; produced by Metro-Goldwyn-Mayer, Original Film and Monarch Pictures
October 15, 2003	The Texas Chainsaw Massacre	international distribution outside Italy only; co-production with New Line Cinema, Radar Pictures and Platinum Dunes
October 17, 2003	Sylvia	North American distribution only; produced by Capitol Films and BBC Films
October 28, 2003	Long Time Dead	direct-to-video in U.S.; co-production with StudioCanal and Working Title Films
November 21, 2003	21 Grams	Nominated - César Award for Best Foreign Film
March 19, 2004	Eternal Sunshine of the Spotless Mind	co-production with Anonymous Content; Nominated - BAFTA Award for Best Film; Nominated - César Award for Best Foreign Film; Nominated - Critics' Choice Movie Award for Best Picture; Nominated - Golden Globe Award for Best Motion Picture - Musical or Comedy; Nominated - Gotham Independent Film Award for Best Feature
March 26, 2004	Ned Kelly	distribution in the U.S., the CIS, the Baltics and the Philippines only; produced by StudioCanal, Working Title Films and Endymion Films
April 27, 2004	My Little Eye	U.S. distribution only; co-production with StudioCanal and Working Title Films
May 7, 2004	Van Helsing	Japanese, Korean and Filipino distribution only; produced by Universal Pictures and the Sommers Company
May 12, 2004	Bad Education	international distribution outside Spain only; produced by El Deseo; Nominated - Goya Award for Best Film
May 14, 2004	Mean Creek	international distribution outside Latin America, the U.K., Ireland, Australia and New Zealand only; produced by Whitewater Films; distributed in North and Latin America, the U.K., Ireland, Australia and New Zealand by Paramount Classics
May 19, 2004	House of Flying Daggers	international distribution outside Spain, China, Hong Kong, Singapore and India only; produced by Edko Films, China Film Co-Production Corporation, Elite Group Enterprises, Zhang Yimou Studio and Beijing New Picture Films
July 14, 2004	The Door in the Floor	
September 1, 2004	Vanity Fair	
October 15, 2004	The Motorcycle Diaries	North American distribution only; produced by FilmFour; BAFTA Award for Best Film Not in the English Language; Nominated - BIFA for Best Foreign Independent Film; Nominated - César Award for Best Foreign Film; Nominated - Critics' Choice Movie Award for Best Foreign Language Film; Nominated - Golden Globe Award for Best Foreign Language Film
December 29, 2004	In Good Company	international distribution outside French and Japanese home media only; produced by Depth of Field
February 4, 2005	Rory O'Shea Was Here	North American distribution only; co-production with StudioCanal and Working Title Films
May 6, 2005	Brothers	U.S. distribution only; co-acquisition with IFC Films
June 17, 2005	My Summer of Love	distribution in North America, Australia, New Zealand, Scandinavia and the CIS only; produced by BBC Films; BAFTA Award for Outstanding British Film; Nominated - BIFA for Best British Independent Film; Nominated - European Film Award for Best Film
August 5, 2005	Broken Flowers	co-production with Five Roses and BAC Films; Nominated - BIFA for Best Foreign Independent Film
August 31, 2005	The Constant Gardener	distribution only; produced by Potboiler Productions and UK Film Council; BIFA for Best British Independent Film; Nominated - BAFTA Award for Best Film; Nominated - BAFTA Award for Outstanding British Film; Nominated - Critics' Choice Movie Award for Best Picture; Nominated - Golden Globe Award for Best Motion Picture - Drama
October 18, 2005	House of Voices	distribution outside French-speaking territories only
October 28, 2005	Prime	international distribution only; produced by Stratus Film Company, Team Todd and Younger Than You
November 23, 2005	Pride and Prejudice	U.S. distribution only; produced by StudioCanal, Working Title Films and Scion Films; distributed internationally by Universal Pictures outside France
November 23, 2005	The Ice Harvest	
December 9, 2005	Brokeback Mountain	co-production with River Road Entertainment; BAFTA Award for Best Film; Critics' Choice Movie Award for Best Picture; GLAAD Media Award for Outstanding Film - Wide Release; Golden Globe Award for Best Motion Picture - Drama; Independent Spirit Award for Best Film; Satellite Award for Best Film - Drama; Nominated - Academy Award for Best Picture; Nominated - Bodil Award for Best American Film; Nominated - César Award for Best Foreign Film; Nominated - David di Donatello for Best Foreign Film; Inducted into the National Film Registry in 2018
February 3, 2006	Something New	
March 17, 2006	Volver	international distribution outside Italy, Spain and India only; produced by El Deseo
March 31, 2006	Brick	distribution only Nominated - Grand Jury Prize Dramatic
April 7, 2006	On a Clear Day	North American distribution only
April 21, 2006	Silent Hill	international distribution outside France and Latin America only; produced by Silent Hill DCP Inc., Davis Films and Konami; distributed in the U.S. and Latin America by Sony Pictures Releasing under TriStar Pictures
July 28, 2006	Scoop	North American, Australian and New Zealand distribution only; produced by BBC Films and Ingenious Film Partners
September 8, 2006	Hollywoodland	North American distribution only; co-production with Miramax Films
September 15, 2006	The Ground Truth	
October 27, 2006	Catch a Fire	North American distribution only; co-production with Working Title Films and Mirage Enterprises; distributed internationally by Universal Pictures outside France
December 15, 2006	The Secret Life of Words	international distribution only
February 15, 2007	Curse of the Golden Flower	international distribution outside Latin America, Spain, China, Hong Kong and India only; produced by Edko Films, Beijing New Picture Film Company and Film Partner International; Nominated - Hong Kong Film Award for Best Film; Nominated - Saturn Award for Best International Film
June 29, 2007	Evening	
August 3, 2007	Talk to Me	North American distribution only; co-production with Sidney Kimmel Entertainment and The Mark Gordon Company
September 14, 2007	Eastern Promises	distribution outside U.K. television and Canada only; co-production with BBC Films, Serendipity Point Films and Kudos Pictures; Toronto International Film Festival People's Choice Award; Nominated - BAFTA Award for Outstanding British Film; Nominated - Genie Award for Best Motion Picture; Nominated - Golden Globe Award for Best Motion Picture - Drama
September 21, 2007	Into the Wild	select international distribution only; produced by Paramount Vantage, River Road Entertainment and Linson Entertainment; select international distribution owned by StudioCanal
September 28, 2007	Lust, Caution	distribution outside China, Hong Kong, Indonesia, Malaysia, Singapore and Taiwan only; co-production with River Road Entertainment and Haishang Films; Golden Lion; Hong Kong Film Award for Best Asian Film; Nominated - BAFTA Award for Best Film Not in the English Language; Nominated - Critics' Choice Movie Award for Best Foreign Language Film; Nominated - Golden Globe Award for Best Foreign Language Film
October 19, 2007	Reservation Road	co-production with Random House Films
October 26, 2007	Dan in Real Life	international distribution only; co-production with Touchstone Pictures; distributed in North America by Walt Disney Studios Motion Pictures
December 7, 2007	Atonement	North American distribution only; co-production with StudioCanal and Working Title Films; distributed internationally by Universal Pictures outside France; BAFTA Award for Best Film; Golden Globe Award for Best Motion Picture - Drama; Nominated - Academy Award for Best Picture; Nominated - BAFTA Award for Outstanding British Film; Nominated - European Film Award for Best Film
January 20, 2008	Be Kind Rewind	international distribution only; produced by Partizan Films; distributed in North America by New Line Cinema
February 8, 2008	In Bruges	co-production with Film4; Nominated - BAFTA Award for Outstanding British Film; Nominated - Golden Globe Award for Best Motion Picture - Musical or Comedy; Nominated - Satellite Award for Best Film - Musical or Comedy
February 29, 2008	The Other Boleyn Girl	international distribution only; co-production with Columbia Pictures, Relativity Media, Scott Rudin Productions and BBC Films
March 7, 2008	Miss Pettigrew Lives for a Day	
August 29, 2008	Hamlet 2	distribution only
September 12, 2008	Burn After Reading	distribution outside France only; co-production with StudioCanal, Working Title Films and Mike Zoss Productions; Nominated - Critics' Choice Movie Award for Best Comedy; Nominated - Golden Globe Award for Best Motion Picture - Musical or Comedy
September 12, 2008	Blindness	international distribution outside Latin America, Italy and Japan only; produced by Alliance Films, Fox Film do Brasil, GAGA, Asmik Ace, Mikado Film, IFF/CINV, ANCINE, Potboiler Productions, T.Y. Limited, Telefilm Canada, Corus Entertainment, Fiat, BNDES, C&A, Rhombus Media, O2 Filmes and Bee Vine Pictures; distributed in the U.S. by Miramax Films
November 28, 2008	Milk	co-production with Axon Films and Groundswell Productions; GLAAD Media Award for Outstanding Film - Wide Release; Nominated - Academy Award for Best Picture; Nominated - BAFTA Award for Best Film; Nominated - Cesar Award for Best Foreign Film; Nominated - Critics' Choice Movie Award for Best Picture; Nominated - Satellite Award for Best Film - Drama
December 19, 2008	Rudo y Cursi	international distribution only; co-production with Canana Films, Esperanto Filmoj, Cha Cha Cha Films and Producciones Anhelo; distributed in North America by Sony Pictures Classics
February 6, 2009	Coraline	distribution only; produced by Laika and Pandemonium Films; Nominated - Academy Award for Best Animated Feature; Nominated - Annie Award for Best Animated Feature; Nominated - BAFTA Award for Best Animated Film; Nominated - Golden Globe Award for Best Animated Feature Film
March 18, 2009	Broken Embraces	international distribution outside Italy and Spain only; co-production with El Deseo
March 20, 2009	Sin nombre	
May 1, 2009	The Limits of Control	
May 29, 2009	Blood: The Last Vampire	international distribution outside China and Hong Kong only; produced by Edko Films, East Wing Holdings, SAJ and Beijing Happy Pictures
June 26, 2009	Away We Go	
July 31, 2009	Thirst	distribution outside Korea only; co-production with CJ Entertainment and Moho Film; Jury Prize (Cannes Film Festival); Nominated - Palme d'Or
August 28, 2009	Taking Woodstock	Nominated - GLAAD Media Award for Outstanding Film - Wide Release
September 9, 2009	9	co-production with Relativity Media and Starz Animation
September 18, 2009	Love Happens	international distribution outside France only; produced by Relativity Media, Stuber Productions and Camp/Thompson Pictures
October 2, 2009	A Serious Man	distribution outside France only; co-production with StudioCanal, Working Title Films and Mike Zoss Productions; Nominated - Academy Award for Best Picture; Nominated - Critics' Choice Movie Award for Best Picture; Nominated - David di Donatello for Best Foreign Film; Nominated - Satellite Award for Best Film - Musical or Comedy
October 2, 2009	The Invention of Lying	international distribution only; produced by Radar Pictures and Media Rights Capital; distributed in North America by Warner Bros. Pictures
November 13, 2009	Pirate Radio	North American distribution only; co-production with StudioCanal and Working Title Films; distributed internationally by Universal Pictures outside France

=== 2010s ===
Release date	Film title	Notes
February 9, 2010	True Legend	international distribution outside China and Hong Kong only; co-production with Edko Films and Shanghai Film Group
March 26, 2010	Greenberg	co-production with Scott Rudin Productions
May 7, 2010	Babies	distribution in North America, Mexico, Italy, Korea, Scandinavia and South Africa only; produced by StudioCanal and Chez Wam
July 30, 2010	The Kids Are All Right	distribution in North America, the U.K., Ireland, Germany, Austria and South Africa only; produced by Gilbert Films, Mandalay Vision and Antidote Films; Golden Globe Award for Best Motion Picture - Musical or Comedy; GLAAD Media Award for Outstanding Film - Wide Release; Nominated - Academy Award for Best Picture; Nominated - Independent Spirit Award for Best Film; Nominated - Satellite Award for Best Film - Musical or Comedy
September 3, 2010	The American	co-production with This is that, Smokehouse Pictures and Greenlit
October 8, 2010	It's Kind of a Funny Story	co-production with Misher Films and Wayfare Entertainment
October 20, 2010	Biutiful	international distribution only; co-production with Menage Atroz, MOD Producciones, Televisión Española, Televisió de Catalunya and Ikiru Films; distributed in North America by Roadside Attractions and LD Entertainment; Nominated - Academy Award for Best Foreign Language Film; Nominated - BAFTA - Best Film Not in the English Language; Nominated - Bodil Award for Best Non-American Film; Nominated - Critics' Choice Movie Award for Best Foreign Language Film; Nominated - Golden Globe Award for Best Foreign Language Film; Nominated - Palme d'Or; Nominated - Satellite Award for Best Foreign Language Film
November 5, 2010	Another Year	international distribution only; co-production with the UK Film Council, Film4 and Thin Man Films; distributed by Sony Pictures Classics in North America; Nominated - BAFTA Award for Outstanding British Film; Nominated - Bodil Award for Best Non-American Film; Nominated - David di Donatello for Best European Film; Nominated - Palme d'Or
December 24, 2010	Somewhere	distribution outside France, the Benelux, Switzerland, Italy and select Asian territories including Japan only; co-production with Tohokushinsha, Pathe Distribution, Medusa Film and American Zoetrope
February 11, 2011	The Eagle	distribution outside U.K. free television only; co-production with Film4, DMG Entertainment and Toledo Productions
March 11, 2011	Jane Eyre	co-production with BBC Films and Ruby Films; Nominated - Goya Award for Best European Film
April 8, 2011	Hanna	co-production with Studio Babelsberg and Holleran Company; international rights outside the U.K., Ireland, Australia, New Zealand, Greece, Cyprus, the Middle East, Israel and the CIS licensed to Sony Pictures Releasing International
April 26, 2011	Africa First: Volume One	A Focus World film
June 3, 2011	Beginners	distribution outside Canada, France, Australia, New Zealand, Scandinavia and the Benelux only; produced by Olympus Pictures, Parts & Labor and Northwood Productions; GLAAD Media Award for Outstanding Film - Wide Release; Nominated - Independent Spirit Award for Best Film
June 14, 2011	Adrift	released under Focus World in the U.S.
August 19, 2011	One Day	co-production with Film4 and Color Force
August 31, 2011	The Debt	distribution only; produced by Miramax and MARV
October 14, 2011	Bombay Beach	A Focus World film; U.S. distribution only
December 9, 2011	Tinker Tailor Soldier Spy	North American distribution only; produced by StudioCanal and Working Title Films; BAFTA Award for Outstanding British Film; Nominated - BAFTA Award for Best Film; Nominated - Golden Lion; Nominated - Satellite Award for Best Film
December 28, 2011	Pariah	distribution only; produced by Northstar Pictures, Sundial Pictures, Aid+Abet, Chicken & Egg Pictures and MBK Entertainment; GLAAD Media Award for Outstanding Film - Limited Release; Nominated - Grand Jury Prize Dramatic; Inducted into the National Film Registry in 2022
February 7, 2012	Gnarr	A Focus World film; U.S. distribution only
February 10, 2012	Return	A Focus World film; U.S. co-distribution with Dada Films only
March 2, 2012	Being Flynn	co-production with Depth of Field, Corduroy Films and Tribeca Productions
April 27, 2012	The Broken Tower	A Focus World film; U.S. distribution only
May 25, 2012	Moonrise Kingdom	distribution only; produced by American Empirical Pictures and Indian Paintbrush; Nominated - Golden Globe Award for Best Motion Picture - Musical or Comedy; Nominated - Independent Spirit Award for Best Film; Nominated - Palme d'Or; Nominated - Satellite Award for Best Film
June 22, 2012	Seeking a Friend for the End of the World	U.S. distribution only; produced by Mandate Pictures, Indian Paintbrush and Anonymous Content
August 14, 2012	Juan of the Dead	A Focus World film; U.S. distribution only
August 15, 2012	Africa First: Volume Two	A Focus World film
August 17, 2012	ParaNorman	distribution only; produced by Laika; Nominated - Academy Award for Best Animated Feature; Nominated - Annie Award for Best Animated Feature; Nominated - BAFTA Award for Best Animated Film; Nominated - Critics' Choice Movie Award for Best Animated Feature; Nominated - GLAAD Media Award for Outstanding Film – Wide Release; Nominated - Satellite Award for Best Animated or Mixed Media Feature; Nominated - Saturn Award for Best Animated Film
August 31, 2012	For a Good Time, Call...	distribution only; produced by AdScott Pictures, Anne in the Middle, Principal Entertainment and Nasser Entertainment Group
October 26, 2012	Cloud Atlas	international distribution outside the U.K., Ireland, Australia, New Zealand, France, Germany, Austria, Spain, the Czech Republic, Slovakia, Bulgaria, Hungary, Romania, Russia, Japan, China and Hong Kong only; produced by Cloud Atlas Productions, X-Filme Creative Pool, Anarchos Pictures and A-Company Filmed Entertainment; distributed in North America and select international territories by Warner Bros. Pictures; Nominated - German Film Award for Best Fiction Film; Nominated - GLAAD Media Award for Outstanding Film – Wide Release; Nominated - Saturn Award for Best Science Fiction Film
November 16, 2012	Anna Karenina	co-production with Working Title Films; Nominated - BAFTA Award for Outstanding British Film; Nominated - David di Donatello for Best European Film; Nominated - Saturn Award for Best International Film
December 7, 2012	Hyde Park on Hudson	distribution outside U.K. free television only; co-production with Film4 Productions
December 28, 2012	Promised Land	co-production with Participant Media, Image Nation Abu Dhabi, Pearl Street Films, Sunday Night Productions and Media Farm; Nominated - Golden Bear
March 22, 2013	Admission	co-production with Depth of Field
April 12, 2013	The Place Beyond the Pines	U.S. distribution only; produced by Sidney Kimmel Entertainment and Electric City Entertainment; Nominated - Saturn Award for Best Thriller Film
May 3, 2013	Greetings from Tim Buckley	A Focus World film; U.S. co-distribution with Tribeca Film only
May 24, 2013	We Steal Secrets	A Focus World film; distribution only
June 21, 2013	The Attack	A Focus World film; North American digital and television distribution only
July 19, 2013	The World's End	North American distribution only; produced by Working Title Films, Relativity Media and Big Talk Productions; distributed internationally by Universal Pictures
August 1, 2013	Blue Jasmine	international distribution only; produced by Perdido Productions and Gravier Productions; distributed in North America by Sony Pictures Classics; Nominated - César Award for Best Foreign Film; Nominated- David di Donatello for Best Foreign Film; Nominated - Satellite Award for Best Film
August 30, 2013	The Lifeguard	A Focus World film; U.S. co-distribution with Screen Media Films only
August 30, 2013	Closed Circuit	co-production with Working Title Films
September 19, 2013	The Last Days on Mars	international distribution only; co-production with the BFI, Bord Scannán na hÉireann / the Irish Film Board, Qwerty Films and Fantastic Films; distributed in the U.S. by Magnet Releasing
September 20, 2013	C.O.G.	A Focus World film; U.S. co-distribution with Screen Media Films only
November 1, 2013	Dallas Buyers Club	U.S. and Latin American distribution excluding airlines only; produced by Voltage Pictures and Truth Entertainment; Nominated - Academy Award for Best Picture; Nominated - Bodil Award for Best American Film; Nominated - Critics' Choice Movie Award for Best Picture; Nominated - GLAAD Media Award for Outstanding Film – Wide Release
January 31, 2014	Love Is in the Air	A Focus World film
January 31, 2014	That Awkward Moment	U.S. theatrical distribution only; produced by Treehouse Pictures, Aversano Films, What If It Barks Films, Ninjas Runnin' Wild Productions and Virgin Produced
March 21, 2014	Bad Words	distribution only; produced by Darko Entertainment, MXN Entertainment and Aggregate Films
May 2, 2014	Walk of Shame	A Focus World film; U.S. distribution only
June 13, 2014	The Signal	U.S. distribution only; produced by IM Global and Automatik
July 18, 2014	Wish I Was Here	North American, Polish and South African distribution only; produced by Worldview Entertainment, Double Feature Films and Second Stix Films
September 26, 2014	The Boxtrolls	distribution only; produced by Laika; Nominated - Academy Award for Best Animated Feature; Nominated - Annie Award for Best Animated Feature; Nominated - BAFTA Award for Best Animated Film; Nominated - Critics' Choice Movie Award for Best Animated Feature; Nominated - Golden Globe Award for Best Animated Feature Film; Nominated - Satellite Award for Best Animated or Mixed Media Feature; Nominated - Saturn Award for Best Animated Film
October 10, 2014	I Am Ali	A Focus World film
October 10, 2014	Kill the Messenger	co-production with Bluegrass Films and the Combine; international rights outside the U.K., Ireland, Germany, Austria, Switzerland and Scandinavia licensed to Sierra/Affinity
November 7, 2014	The Theory of Everything	North American distribution only; produced by Working Title Films; distributed internationally by Universal Pictures; BAFTA Award for Outstanding British Film; David di Donatello for Best European Film; Saturn Award for Best International Film; Nominated - Academy Award for Best Picture; Nominated - BAFTA Award for Best Film; Nominated - Critics' Choice Movie Award for Best Picture; Nominated - Golden Globe Award for Best Motion Picture – Drama; Nominated - Satellite Award for Best Film
December 19, 2014	Mr. Turner	international distribution outside Latin America and Eastern Europe only; co-production with Diaphana Films, Film4, the British Film Institute, Canal+, Ciné+, France Televisions, France 3 Cinéma and Ingenious Film Partners; distributed in North and Latin America and Eastern Europe by Sony Pictures Classics; Nominated - Palme d'Or; Nominated - Satellite Award for Best Film
January 23, 2015	Black Sea	distribution outside U.K. free television only; co-production with Film4 and Cowboy Films; international rights outside the U.K. and Ireland licensed to Sierra/Affinity
February 13, 2015	Fifty Shades of Grey	studio credit only; co-production with Michael De Luca Productions and Trigger Street Productions; distributed by Universal Pictures
February 27, 2015	Maps to the Stars	A Focus World film; U.S. distribution only
April 8, 2015	Mr. Right	A Focus World film; U.S. distribution only
May 8, 2015	5 Flights Up	A Focus World film; U.S. distribution only
June 5, 2015	Insidious: Chapter 3	U.S. theatrical distribution under the Gramercy Pictures label only; produced by Stage 6 Films, Entertainment One and Blumhouse Productions
June 26, 2015	A Little Chaos	A Focus World film; North American and Scandinavian distribution only; produced by Lionsgate UK, Artemis Films, BBC Films, Lipsync Productions and Potboiler Productions
July 10, 2015	Self/less	U.S. distribution only; co-production with Endgame Entertainment
August 7, 2015	Cop Car	A Focus World film; distribution only
August 21, 2015	Sinister 2	U.S. distribution under the Gramercy Pictures label, co-production with Entertainment One, Blumhouse Productions and IM Global
October 9, 2015	Trash	A Focus World film; U.S. distribution only; distributed internationally by Universal Pictures
October 22, 2015	Suffragette	distribution in North and Latin America, India, Korea, Poland, Hungary, the Czech Republic, Bulgaria, Slovakia, the Baltics and the CIS only; produced by Pathé, Film4 Productions, the BFI and Ruby Films
November 27, 2015	The Danish Girl	North American distribution only; produced by Working Title Films; distributed internationally by Universal Pictures; Queer Lion; Nominated - BAFTA Award for Outstanding British Film; Nominated - GLAAD Media Award for Outstanding Film – Wide Release; Nominated - Golden Lion
February 19, 2016	Race	U.S. distribution only; produced by the Jesse Owens Foundation, The Luminary Group, Forecast Pictures, Solofilms, Trinica, Trinity Race and Totally Commercial Films; Nominated - Genie Award for Best Motion Picture
March 4, 2016	London Has Fallen	U.S. distribution under the Gramercy Pictures label; produced by Millennium Films and G-BASE
March 11, 2016	The Young Messiah	North American distribution only; co-production with 1492 Pictures and Ocean Blue Entertainment
April 29, 2016	Term Life	A Focus World film
May 13, 2016	Search Party	A Focus World film; U.S. and select international distribution only
June 10, 2016	Puerto Ricans in Paris	A Focus World film; U.S. distribution only
August 19, 2016	A Tale of Love and Darkness	A Focus World film; U.S. distribution only
August 19, 2016	Kubo and the Two Strings	distribution only; produced by Laika; BAFTA Award for Best Animated Film; National Board of Review Award for Best Animated Feature; Nominated - Academy Award for Best Animated Feature; Nominated - Annie Award for Best Animated Feature; Nominated - Critics' Choice Movie Award for Best Animated Feature; Nominated - Golden Globe Award for Best Animated Feature Film; Nominated - Satellite Award for Best Animated or Mixed Media Feature
September 9, 2016	Kicks	A Focus World film; distribution only
October 14, 2016	American Honey	international distribution outside Latin America, France, the Benelux, the Middle East, Israel, Turkey, Poland, former Yugoslavia, Korea and China with Universal Pictures only; produced by BFI, Film4, ManDown Pictures, Maven Pictures, Parts & Laboratory and Pulse Films; distributed in North America by A24; co-distributed in Japan by Albatros Film; Jury Prize (Cannes Film Festival); Nominated - BAFTA Award for Outstanding British Film; Nominated - Bodil Award for Best Non-American Film; Nominated - Palme d'Or; Nominated - Independent Spirit Award for Best Film
October 21, 2016	In a Valley of Violence	A Focus World film; distribution only; produced by Blumhouse Productions
November 4, 2016	Loving	distribution outside France, Italy, Spain, Switzerland, Australia, New Zealand, Japan and the Middle East only; produced by Random Films, Big Beach, Augusta Films, Tri-State Pictures; Nominated - Critics' Choice Movie Award for Best Picture; Nominated - Palme d'Or; Nominated - Satellite Award for Best Film
November 18, 2016	Nocturnal Animals	co-production with Fade to Black Films; co-distributed in Japan by Bitters End and Parco; David di Donatello for Best Foreign Film; Nominated - Satellite Award for Best Film
December 14, 2016	Manchester by the Sea	uncredited onscreen, distribution in France, Germany, Austria, Switzerland, Australia, New Zealand, Spain, Italy, the Benelux, China, Japan, India, Malaysia, the Middle East, the Philippines, Singapore, Vietnam and the CIS with Universal Pictures only; produced by K Period Media, Pearl Street Films, The Media Farm, The A/Middleton Project and B Story; distributed in the U.S. by Amazon Studios and Roadside Attractions; National Board of Review Award for Best Film; Satellite Award for Best Film; Nominated - Academy Award for Best Picture; Nominated - BAFTA Award for Best Film; Nominated - Bodil Award for Best American Film; Nominated - César Award for Best Foreign Film; Nominated - Critics' Choice Movie Award for Best Picture; Nominated - David di Donatello for Best Foreign Film; Nominated - Golden Globe Award for Best Motion Picture – Drama; Nominated - Independent Spirit Award for Best Film
December 23, 2016	A Monster Calls	North American distribution only; co-production with Participant Media and River Road Entertainment; Nominated - Goya Award for Best Film; Nominated - Saturn Award for Best Fantasy Film
January 13, 2017	La La Land	Spanish distribution with Universal Pictures only; produced by Summit Entertainment, Marc Platt Productions, Imposter Pictures and Gilbert Films; distributed worldwide by Lionsgate; BAFTA Award for Best Film; Bodil Award for Best American Film; Critics' Choice Movie Award for Best Picture; Golden Globe Award for Best Motion Picture – Musical or Comedy; Japan Academy Film Prize for Outstanding Foreign Language Film; Satellite Award for Best Film; Saturn Award for Best Independent Film; Nominated- Academy Award for Best Picture; Nominated - César Award for Best Foreign Film; Nominated - David di Donatello for Best Foreign Film; Nominated - Golden Lion
March 10, 2017	Raw	A Focus World film; distribution outside Latin America, France, Australia, New Zealand, Greece, Cyprus, the Benelux, the Czech Republic, Slovakia, former Yugoslavia and Israel only
March 31, 2017	The Zookeeper's Wife	distribution in the U.S., the U.K., Ireland, France, Germany, Austria, Switzerland, Scandinavia, Latin America and Eastern Europe only; produced by Scion Films, Electric City Entertainment, Tollin Productions, Rowe/Miller Productions and Czech Anglo Productions
April 27, 2017	The Red Turtle	select international distribution with Universal Pictures only; produced by Wild Bunch, Studio Ghibli, Why Not Productions, Prima Linea Productions, Arte France Cinéma, CN4 Productions and Belvision; distributed in North and Latin America by Sony Pictures Classics, in France by Wild Bunch and in Japan by Toho; Annie Award for Best Animated Feature – Independent; Nominated - Academy Award for Best Animated Feature; Nominated - César Award for Best Animated Film; Nominated - Critics' Choice Movie Award for Best Animated Feature; Nominated - European Film Award for Best Animated Film; Nominated - Satellite Award for Best Animated or Mixed Media Feature
June 16, 2017	The Book of Henry	distribution only; produced by Sidney Kimmel Entertainment and Double Nickel Entertainment
June 23, 2017	The Beguiled	distribution only; produced by American Zoetrope and FR Productions; co-distributed in Japan by Asmik Ace and Star Channel Movies; Nominated - Palme d'Or
July 7, 2017	It Comes at Night	U.K. and Irish distribution with Universal Pictures only; produced by A24 and Animal Kingdom
July 28, 2017	Atomic Blonde	distribution in North and Latin America, the U.K., Ireland, Australia, New Zealand, France, Germany, Austria, Switzerland, China, the Benelux and Italy only; produced by Denver and Delilah Productions, Closed on Mondays Entertainment, Sierra Pictures and 87Eleven Productions
September 22, 2017	Victoria & Abdul	co-production with BBC Films and Working Title Films; co-distributed in Japan by Bitters End and Parco
October 27, 2017	A Ghost Story	international distribution outside the U.K., Ireland, Australia, New Zealand, Japan and Korea with Universal Pictures only; produced by Sailor Bear, Zero Trans Fat Productions, Ideaman Studios and Scared Sheetless; co-distributed in Latin America by Cine Caníbal, distributed in North America by A24
November 24, 2017	Darkest Hour	distribution only; produced by Working Title Films and Perfect World Pictures; co-distributed in Japan by Bitters End and Parco; Nominated - Academy Award for Best Picture; Nominated - BAFTA Award for Best Film; Nominated - BAFTA Award for Outstanding British Film; Nominated - Critics' Choice Movie Award for Best Picture
December 1, 2017	Lady Bird	international distribution with Universal Pictures only; produced by A24, Scott Rudin Productions and IAC Films; Golden Globe Award for Best Motion Picture - Musical or Comedy; Nominated - Academy Award for Best Picture; Nominated - Bodil Award for Best American Film; Nominated - Critics' Choice Movie Award for Best Picture; Nominated - GLAAD Media Award for Outstanding Film - Wide Release; Nominated - Independent Spirit Award for Best Film; Nominated - Satellite Award for Best Film
December 25, 2017	Phantom Thread	co-production with Annapurna Pictures and Ghoulardi Film Company; co-distributed in Japan by Bitters End and Parco; Nominated - Academy Award for Best Picture; Nominated - David di Donatello for Best Foreign Film; Nominated - Goya Award for Best European Film
March 9, 2018	Thoroughbreds	distribution only; produced by June Pictures, B Story and Big Indie Pictures; co-distributed in Japan by Parco
March 16, 2018	7 Days In Entebbe	North American distribution only; produced by Participant Media and Working Title Films
April 12, 2018	Lean on Pete	distribution in all media excluding airlines in Germany, Austria, Scandinavia, Hungary, Romania, the Czech Republic, Slovakia, Bulgaria and Asia excluding China, Hong Kong, Taiwan, Japan and Korea with Universal Pictures only; produced by Film4, BFI and the Bureau; distributed in the U.S. by A24 and in the U.K. and Ireland by Curzon Film; Nominated - Golden Lion
April 20, 2018	The Leisure Seeker	U.K. and Irish distribution excluding airlines with Universal Pictures only; produced by BAC Films, Rai Cinema and Indiana Production Company; distributed in the U.S., Latin America, Asia excluding Japan, Taiwan and Singapore, Eastern Europe, Portugal and South Africa by Sony Pictures Classics, in France by BAC Films and in Italy by 01 Distribution; Nominated - Golden Lion
April 24, 2018	Loro 1	Italian distribution with Universal Pictures only; produced by Indigo Film, Pathé, France 2 Cinema, OCS, France Televisions, Direzione Generale Cinema, Regione Lazio and Sardegna Film Commission
May 4, 2018	Tully	distribution in all media excluding airlines in North America, the U.K., Ireland, Italy, Spain, China, Malaysia, Singapore, the Czech Republic, Slovakia, Hungary and Romania only; co-production with Bron Studios, Creative Wealth Media, Right of Way Films, Denver and Delilah Productions and West Egg Studios
May 10, 2018	Loro 2	Italian distribution with Universal Pictures only; produced by Indigo Film, Pathé, France 2 Cinema, OCS, France Televisions, Direzione Generale Cinema, Regione Lazio and Sardegna Film Commission
May 18, 2018	Pope Francis: A Man of His Word	distribution only; produced by The Palindrome, Centro Televisivo Vaticano, Célestes Images, Solares Fondazione delle arti, Neue Road Movies, Decia Films, Fondazione Solares Suisse and PTS Art's Factory
June 8, 2018	Won't You Be My Neighbor?	distribution only; produced by Trembolo Productions; Independent Spirit Award for Best Documentary Feature; Nominated - Satellite Award for Best Documentary Film
August 10, 2018	BlacKkKlansman	distribution only; produced by Legendary Entertainment, Monkeypaw Productions, Blumhouse Productions, QC Entertainment, 40 Acres and a Mule Filmworks and Nicky Lies Media; co-distributed in Japan by Parco; Grand Prix (Cannes Film Festival); Satellite Award for Best Independent Film; Nominated - Academy Award for Best Picture; Nominated - BAFTA Award for Best Film; Nominated - Critics' Choice Movie Award for Best Picture; Nominated - Golden Globe Award for Best Motion Picture - Drama; Nominated - Palme d'Or
August 31, 2018	The Little Stranger	distribution outside the U.K., Ireland, France and Switzerland only; produced by Pathé, Film4, Ingenious Media, Element Pictures and Potboiler Pictures
November 2, 2018	Boy Erased	co-production with Perfect World Pictures, Anonymous Content and Blue-Tongue Films; co-distributed in Latin America by Cine Caníbal and in Japan by Parco; GLAAD Media Award for Outstanding Film - Limited Release; Nominated - AACTA Award for Best Film
November 2, 2018	Juliet, Naked	U.K. and Irish distribution with Universal Pictures only; produced by Apatow Productions, Bona Fide Productions and Los Angeles Media Fund; distributed in North America by Lionsgate and Roadside Attractions
November 2, 2018	Sorry to Bother You	international distribution outside Scandinavia and Japan with Universal Pictures only; produced by Cinereach, Significant Productions, MNM Creative, MACRO and the Space Program; distributed in North America by Annapurna Pictures; Nominated - Critics' Choice Movie Award for Best Comedy; Nominated - Grand Jury Prize Dramatic; Nominated - Saturn Award for Best Science Fiction Film
November 30, 2018	Bathtubs Over Broadway	A Focus World film; distribution only; produced by Blumhouse Productions and Tremolo Productions
December 7, 2018	Mary Queen of Scots	co-production with Working Title Films; co-distributed in Japan by Bitters End; Nominated - Satellite Award for Best Film - Drama
December 25, 2018	On the Basis of Sex (Note: Co-owned by Content Partners LLC)	North American distribution only; produced by Participant Media, Robert Cort Productions and Alibaba Pictures
February 8, 2019	Everybody Knows	distribution in North America, the U.K., Ireland, Australia, New Zealand, South Africa, Spain, India, Thailand, Singapore, Indonesia, Malaysia, the Philippines, Vietnam and the Middle East excluding Iran only; produced by Memento Films, Morena Films, Lucky Red, France 3 Cinéma, Untitled Films AIE, Rai Cinema, Cofinova 14, Indéfilms 6, ICAA, Eurimages, Canal+, France Télévisions, Ciné+ and Movistar+ Nominated - Goya Award for Best Film; Nominated - Palme d'Or
February 28, 2019	The Sisters Brothers	U.K., Irish, Italian, Australian, New Zealand and Eastern European distribution with Universal Pictures only; produced by Why Not Productions, Page 114, Michael De Luca Productions, Apache Films and Top Drawer Entertainment; Nominated - César Award for Best Film; Nominated - Golden Lion
March 1, 2019	Greta	distribution in North America, the U.K., Ireland, Australia, New Zealand, China, India and Turkey only; produced by Showbox, Sidney Kimmel Entertainment, Starlight Culture Entertainment Group and Fís Éireann/Screen Ireland; Nominated - Saturn Award for Best Thriller Film
March 1, 2019	What They Had	select international distribution with Universal Pictures only; produced by Unified Pictures, Bona Fide Productions, Look to the Sky Pictures and June Pictures; distributed in North America by Bleecker Street
March 15, 2019	The Mustang	distribution outside France only; co-production with Légende Films, France 3 Cinéma, Nexus Factory, Umedia, Ufund, Canal+, Ciné+ and France Télévisions
March 15, 2019	Captive State	North American distribution only; produced by Participant Media and Lightfuse & Gettaway
June 6, 2019	Pain and Glory	Latin American, Australian and New Zealand distribution with Universal Pictures only; produced by El Deseo; distributed in North America by Sony Pictures Classics and in Spain by Sony Pictures Releasing International; Goya Award for Best Film; Nominated - Academy Award for Best Foreign Language Film; Nominated - BAFTA Award for Best Film Not in the English Language; Nominated - Bodil Award for Best Non-American Film; Nominated - César Award for Best Foreign Film; Nominated - Critics' Choice Movie Award for Best Foreign Language Film; Nominated - European Film Award for Best Film; Nominated - GLAAD Media Award for Outstanding Film - Limited Release; Nominated - Golden Globe Award for Best Foreign Language Film; Nominated - Palme d'Or; Nominated - Queer Palm; Nominated - Satellite Award for Best Foreign Language Film
June 14, 2019	The Dead Don't Die	distribution outside Japan only; produced by Kill the Head, Longride, Animal Kingdom, Chimney and Film i Väst; co-distributed in Latin America by Cine Caníbal; Nominated - Palme d'Or
August 6, 2019	The Souvenir	international distribution outside the U.K., Ireland and Taiwan with Universal Pictures only; produced by JWH Films, BBC Films, BFI, Sikelia Productions and Protagonist Pictures; distributed in North America by A24 and the U.K. and Ireland by Curzon Film
September 20, 2019	Downton Abbey	co-production with Carnival Films; Nominated - GLAAD Media Award for Outstanding Film - Wide Release
October 25, 2019	The Last Black Man in San Francisco	select international distribution with Universal Pictures only; produced by Plan B Entertainment, Longshot Features and Mavia Entertainment; distributed in North America by A24; Nominated - Grand Jury Prize Dramatic
November 1, 2019	Harriet	co-production with Perfect World Pictures, New Balloon, Stay Gold Features and Debra Martin Chase Productions; co-distributed in Japan by Parco
November 8, 2019	Luce	select international distribution with Universal Pictures only; produced by Dream Factory Group, Altona Filmhaus and New Tropics; distributed in North America by Neon and Topic Studios; Nominated - Grand Jury Prize Dramatic
November 22, 2019	Dark Waters	North American distribution only; produced by Participant and Killer Films; Nominated - César Award for Best Foreign Film
December 6, 2019	Ordinary Love	international distribution in all media excluding airlines outside Latin America, India, China, Indonesia, Greece, Spain, former Yugoslavia, the Middle East, Israel, Turkey, Scandinavia and South Africa with Universal Pictures only; produced by the BFI, Northern Ireland Screen, Bankside Films, Out of Orbit, Canderblinks Films, Tempo Productions and Head Gear Films; distributed in North America by Bleecker Street

=== 2020s ===
Release date	Film title	Notes
January 17, 2020	Waves	international distribution outside China and Japan with Universal Pictures only; produced by JW Films and Guy Grand Productions; co-distributed in Latin America by Cine Caníbal, distributed in North America by A24
January 31, 2020	The Lighthouse	international distribution with Universal Pictures only; produced by A24, Regency Enterprises, RT Features and Parts & Labor; co-distributed in Latin America by Cine Caníbal and in Japan by Transformer, distributed in North America by A24; Bodil Award for Best American Film; Nominated - Satellite Award for Best Film - Drama
February 21, 2020	Emma	co-production with Working Title Films, Blueprint Pictures and Perfect World Pictures
March 11, 2020	Clemency	uncredited onscreen, select international distribution with Universal Pictures only; produced by ACE Pictures, Big Indie Pictures and Bronwyn Cornelius Productions; distributed in the US by Neon; Grand Jury Prize Dramatic; Nominated - Independent Spirit Award for Best Film
March 13, 2020	Never Rarely Sometimes Always	distribution outside U.K. free television only; co-production with PASTEL, BBC Films, Tango Entertainment, Mutressa Movies and Cinereach; Silver Bear Grand Jury Prize; Nominated - Golden Bear; Nominated - Grand Jury Prize Dramatic; Nominated - Independent Spirit Award for Best Film
March 13, 2020	The Roads Not Taken	international distribution outside Latin America, Spain, the CIS, the Baltics, Switzerland, Greece, Cyprus, former Yugoslavia, the Middle East, Israel, Turkey, Japan and Singapore with Universal Pictures only; produced by BBC Films, HanWay Films, BFI, Ingenious Media, Head Gear Films, Metrol Technology, Chimney, Adventure Pictures, Film i Väst, Washington Square Films and La Terraza Films; distributed in the US by Bleecker Street; Nominated - Golden Bear
May 29, 2020	The High Note	distribution only; produced by Working Title Films and Perfect World Pictures
June 26, 2020	Irresistible	co-production with Plan B Entertainment and Busboy Productions; co-distributed in Japan by Parco
September 18, 2020	The Way I See It	co-production with Jaywalker Pictures, ACE Content, Platform One Media, MSNBC Films and Trilogy Films; Nominated - Critics' Choice Documentary Award for Best Political Documentary
September 25, 2020	Kajillionaire	distribution only; produced by Annapurna Pictures and Plan B Entertainment; Nominated - GLAAD Media Award for Outstanding Film - Limited Release
October 8, 2020	Dirt Music	Australian and New Zealand distribution with Universal Pictures International only; produced by Film4, Screen Australia, Screenwest, Lotterywest, West Australian Regional Film Fund, Ingenious Media, Cornerstone Films, Wildgaze Films and Aquarius Films
October 30, 2020	Come Play	distribution in North and Latin America, the U.K., Ireland, Australia, New Zealand, France, Germany, Austria, Switzerland, Spain, the Benelux, Eastern Europe, the CIS, Japan, Taiwan, Thailand, Malaysia, Singapore, the Philippines and Turkey only; produced by Amblin Partners, Reliance Entertainment and The Picture Company
November 6, 2020	Let Him Go	co-production with Mazur Kaplan Company; co-distributed in Japan by Parco
December 4, 2020	Half Brothers	co-production with Jason Shuman Productions and Eduardo Cisneros Productions
December 25, 2020	Promising Young Woman	distribution outside Australia, New Zealand, the Benelux, Greece, Cyprus, the Middle East, Israel, the CIS and South Africa only; produced by FilmNation Entertainment and LuckyChap Entertainment; released on Sky Cinema in the U.K. and Ireland; co-distributed in Japan by Parco; BAFTA Award for Outstanding British Film; Nominated - Academy Award for Best Picture; Nominated - BAFTA Award for Best Film; Nominated - Bodil Award for Best Non-American Film; Nominated - Critics' Choice Movie Award for Best Picture; Nominated - Golden Globe Award for Best Motion Picture - Drama; Nominated - Goya Award for Best European Film; Nominated - Satellite Award for Best Film - Drama
February 12, 2021	Land	distribution only; produced by Big Beach, Cinetic Media, HanWay Films, Nomadic Pictures and Flashlight Films
March 5, 2021	Boogie	co-production with Immersive Pictures and Wink Productions
April 8, 2021	Voyagers	distribution in the U.K., Ireland, France, Italy, Scandinavia, Australia and New Zealand with Universal Pictures only; produced by AGC Studios, Thunder Road Films, Fibonacci Films, Nota Bene Films, Stillking Films, Freecss Films and Ingenious Media; released on Sky Cinema in the U.K. and Ireland; distributed in North America by Summit Entertainment through Lionsgate
April 30, 2021	Limbo	distribution outside the U.K., Ireland, Australia and New Zealand only; produced by Caravan Cinema, Film4, Screen Scotland, and BFI; co-distributed in France by L'Atelier Distribution, distributed in the U.K. and Ireland by Mubi; Nominated - BAFTA Award for Outstanding British Film
May 14, 2021	Profile	distribution outside the CIS only; produced by Bazelevs Company and Interface Films
May 21, 2021	Final Account	distribution outside Israel only; produced by Participant, ZEF Productions, and Passion Pictures; co-distributed in Japan by Parco; Nominated - Critics' Choice Documentary Award for Best Historical/Biographical Documentary
June 17, 2021	In the Earth	international distribution with Universal Pictures only; produced by Neon and Rook Films; distributed in North America by Neon
June 18, 2021	The Sparks Brothers	distribution only; produced by MRC and Complete Fiction Pictures; co-distributed in Italy by Lucky Red and in Japan by Parco; Nominated - Critics' Choice Documentary Award for Best Music Documentary
July 16, 2021	Roadrunner: A Film About Anthony Bourdain	distribution only; produced by CNN Films, HBO Max, and Tremolo Productions
July 30, 2021	Stillwater	distribution in North and Latin America, France, Germany, Austria, Switzerland, Italy, Eastern Europe, South Africa, Japan, Taiwan, Thailand, Malaysia, Singapore, the Philippines and the CIS only; produced by DreamWorks Pictures, Anonymous Content, Participant, Slow Pony and 3dot Productions; co-distributed in Japan by Parco
August 18, 2021	People Just Do Nothing: Big in Japan	co-production with BBC Film and Roughcut Films
September 10, 2021	The Card Counter	distribution in the U.S., the U.K., Ireland, Australia, New Zealand, Latin America, France, Switzerland, Italy, Spain, Asia excluding Singapore, Hong Kong, Taiwan and Southeast Asian television, and worldwide airlines only; produced by HanWay Films and LB Entertainment; co-distributed in Latin America by Cine Caníbal, in Italy by Lucky Red, in France by Condor Distribution and in Japan by Transformer; Nominated - Golden Lion
September 17, 2021	Blue Bayou	distribution only; produced by MACRO and Entertainment One; co-distributed in Japan by Parco
October 29, 2021	Last Night in Soho	co-production with Film4 and Working Title Films; co-distributed in Japan by Parco; Nominated - BAFTA Award for Outstanding British Film; Nominated - Saturn Award for Best Horror Film
November 12, 2021	Belfast	co-production with TKBC; co-distributed in Japan by Parco; BAFTA Award for Outstanding British Film; David di Donatello for Best Foreign Film; Satellite Award for Best Film - Drama; Toronto International Film Festival People's Choice Award; Nominated - Academy Award for Best Picture; Nominated - BAFTA Award for Best Film; Nominated - Bodil Award for Best Non-American Film; Nominated - Critics' Choice Movie Award for Best Picture; Nominated - Golden Globe Award for Best Motion Picture - Drama; Nominated - Goya Award for Best European Film
November 26, 2021	Licorice Pizza	studio credit only; co-production with Metro-Goldwyn-Mayer, Bron Studios and Ghoulardi Film Company; distributed by United Artists Releasing in the United States and Universal Pictures internationally excluding Italy, Portugal, Scandinavia and the Middle East; Critics' Choice Movie Award for Best Comedy; National Board of Review Award for Best Film; Nominated - Academy Award for Best Picture; Nominated - BAFTA Award for Best Film; Nominated - Bodil Award for Best American Film; Nominated - Critics' Choice Movie Award for Best Picture; Nominated - David di Donatello for Best Foreign Film; Nominated - Golden Globe Award for Best Motion Picture - Musical or Comedy; Nominated - Satellite Award for Best Film - Musical or Comedy
December 3, 2021	Wolf	distribution outside Russia, Taiwan, the Middle East and Turkey only; produced by Feline Films, Lava Films, Screen Ireland, Polish Film Institute, Eurimages
December 10, 2021	Red Rocket	international distribution outside France, Israel, Australia and New Zealand with Universal Pictures only; produced by FilmNation Entertainment and Cre Film; co-distributed in Latin America by Cine Caníbal and in Japan by Transformer, distributed in North America by A24; Nominated - Bodil Award for Best American Film; Nominated - Palme d'Or
February 2, 2022	The Souvenir Part II	international distribution outside the U.K., Ireland and Taiwan with Universal Pictures only; produced by JWH Films, BBC Film, BFI, Sikelia Productions, Protagonist Pictures and Element Pictures; co-distributed in France by Condor Distribution, distributed in North America by A24 and the UK and Ireland by Picturehouse Entertainment
February 18, 2022	The Cursed	also titled Eight for Silver on some releases; international distribution with Universal Pictures only; produced by LD Entertainment; distributed in the US by LD Entertainment
March 18, 2022	The Outfit	distribution only; produced by FilmNation Entertainment; co-distributed in Latin America by Cine Caníbal
April 1, 2022	You Won't Be Alone	distribution only; produced by Screen Australia, Film Victoria, Causeway Films, Balkanic Media, Head Gear Films and Metrol Technology; co-distributed in Australia and New Zealand by Madman Films; Nominated - World Cinema Dramatic Grand Jury Prize
April 22, 2022	The Northman	co-production with Regency Enterprises, Perfect World Pictures and Square Peg; co-distributed in Japan by Parco; Nominated - Saturn Award for Best Thriller Film
May 20, 2022	Downton Abbey: A New Era	co-production with Carnival Films
June 3, 2022	Watcher	international distribution with Universal Pictures only; produced by Image Nation Abu Dhabi, AGC Studios, Spooky Pictures and Lost City; co-distributed in Latin America by Cine Caníbal and in Italy by Lucky Red, distributed in North America by IFC Midnight and Shudder
June 17, 2022	Brian and Charles	distribution outside U.K. free television only; produced by Film4, BFI, and Mr Box Productions; co-distributed in Italy by Lucky Red; Nominated - BAFTA Award for Outstanding British Film; Nominated - World Cinema Dramatic Grand Jury Prize
July 1, 2022	The Forgiven	international distribution outside U.K. television with Universal Pictures only; produced by House of Un-American Activities, Brookstreet Pictures, Film4, Assemble Media, Head Gear Films, Metrol Technology and LipSync Productions; distributed in North America by Roadside Attractions and Vertical Entertainment
July 15, 2022	Mrs. Harris Goes to Paris	distribution only; produced by eOne Features, Dior, Moonriver Content, Hero Squad, Elysian Films and National Film Institute Hungary; co-distributed in Japan by Parco
July 29, 2022	Vengeance	co-production with Blumhouse Productions and Divide/Conquer
September 2, 2022	Honk for Jesus. Save Your Soul.	distribution with Monkeypaw Productions and Peacock only; produced by Pinky Promise, 59% Productions, Ejime Productions, Rh Negative, and Indian Meadows Productions
September 16, 2022	The Silent Twins	distribution only; produced by Madants, Extreme Emotions, 42, 30West, Canal+, Kindred Spirit, Polish Film Institute and Cofiloisir; co-distributed in Poland by Gutek Film
October 7, 2022	Tár	co-production with EMJAG Productions and Standard Film Company; co-distributed in Japan by GAGA; Nominated - Academy Award for Best Picture; Nominated - BAFTA Award for Best Film; Nominated - Bodil Award for Best English Language Film; Nominated - Critics' Choice Movie Award for Best Picture; Nominated - GLAAD Media Award for Outstanding Film - Wide Release; Nominated - Golden Globe Award for Best Motion Picture - Drama; Nominated - Golden Lion; Nominated - Independent Spirit Award for Best Film; Nominated - Japan Academy Film Prize for Outstanding Foreign Language Film; Nominated - Queer Lion; Nominated - Satellite Award for Best Film - Drama
October 28, 2022	Armageddon Time	co-production with RT Features; co-distributed in Latin America by Cine Caníbal and in Japan by Parco
December 2, 2022	Spoiler Alert	co-production with Semi-Formal Productions and That's Wonderful Productions; co-distributed in Italy by Lucky Red; Nominated - GLAAD Media Award for Outstanding Film - Wide Release
February 17, 2023	Marcel the Shell with Shoes On	international distribution with Universal Pictures International only; produced by Cinereach, Sunbeam TV and Films, Human Woman, Chiodo Bros. Productions and You What I Should; co-distributed in Italy by Lucky Red, in France by L'Atelier Distribution and in Japan by Asmik Ace, distributed in North America by A24; Annie Award for Best Animated Feature - Independent; National Board of Review Award for Best Animated Film; Satellite Award for Best Animated or Mixed Media Feature; Saturn Award for Best Animated Film; Nominated - Academy Award for Best Animated Feature; Nominated - BAFTA Award for Best Animated Film; Nominated - Critics' Choice Movie Award for Best Animated Feature; Nominated - Golden Globe Award for Best Animated Feature Film
February 17, 2023	Of an Age	distribution outside Australia and New Zealand only; produced by Screen Australia, Headgear Films, Causeway Films, and VicScreen; Nominated - AACTA Award for Best Film
March 9, 2023	Last Night of Amore	U.S. and French distribution only; co-production with Indiana Production, MeMo Films and Adler Entertainment; released in the U.S. under Focus World
March 10, 2023	Champions	co-production with Gold Circle Entertainment
March 17, 2023	Inside	distribution outside Germany and Austria only; produced by Heretic, Schiwago, and A Private View; co-distributed in France by L'Atelier Distribution
March 24, 2023	Infinity Pool	select international distribution with Universal Pictures only; produced by Elevation Pictures, Telefilm Canada, Film Forge, 4film, Hero Squared, Eurimages, The Croatian Audiovisual Centre and Celluloid Dreams; distributed in the U.S. by Neon and Topic Studios and Canada by Elevation Pictures; Nominated - Genie Award for Best Motion Picture
March 31, 2023	A Thousand and One	co-production with Sight Unseen, Hillman Grad Productions, and Makeready; co-distributed in Italy by Lucky Red; Grand Jury Prize Dramatic
April 28, 2023	Polite Society	co-production with Working Title Films and Parkville Pictures; co-distributed in Japan by Transformer
May 12, 2023	Book Club: The Next Chapter	co-production with Fifth Season and Makeready
June 16, 2023	Asteroid City	distribution only; produced by Indian Paintbrush and American Empirical Pictures; co-distributed in Japan by Parco; Nominated - Palme d'Or
June 30, 2023	Every Body	co-production with NBC News Studios; co-distributed in the U.K. and Ireland by Dogwoof; Nominated - Critics' Choice Documentary Award for Best Political Documentary; Nominated - GLAAD Media Award for Outstanding Documentary
July 11, 2023	The Starling Girl	international distribution with Universal Pictures only; produced by 2AM; distributed in North America by Bleecker Street
September 8, 2023	My Big Fat Greek Wedding 3	distribution outside Canada only; co-production with Playtone, Gold Circle Entertainment, Home Box Office and Artistic Films
September 19, 2023	Birth/Rebirth	international distribution with Universal Pictures only; produced by Shudder, Retrospecter Films and Elfman + Viste; distributed in North America by IFC Films and Shudder
September 22, 2023	The Lesson	select international distribution with Universal Pictures only; produced by Poison Chef, Egoli Tossell and Jeva Films; distributed in North America by Bleecker Street
October 27, 2023	The Holdovers	distribution outside the Middle East and Turkey only; produced by Miramax and Gran Via Productions; co-distributed in Japan by Bitters End; Satellite Award for Best Film - Musical or Comedy; Nominated - Academy Award for Best Picture; Nominated - BAFTA Award for Best Film; Nominated - Critics' Choice Movie Award for Best Comedy; Nominated - Critics' Choice Movie Award for Best Picture; Nominated - Golden Globe Award for Best Motion Picture - Musical or Comedy; Nominated - Toronto International Film Festival People's Choice Award
November 19, 2023	Showing Up	international distribution outside France with Universal Pictures only; produced by Filmscience; co-distributed in Japan by U-NEXT, distributed in North America by A24
December 1, 2023	Eileen	international distribution with Universal Pictures only; produced by Fifth Season, Film4, Likely Story, Lost Winds Entertainment and Omniscient Productions; co-distributed in Latin America by Cine Caníbal and in Italy by Lucky Red, distributed in North America by Neon
December 8, 2023	Earth Mama	international distribution with Universal Pictures only; produced by A24, Film4, Academy Films and Park Pictures; co-distributed in the U.K. and Ireland by We Are Parable and in Japan by U-NEXT, distributed in North America by A24
December 15, 2023	What Happens Later	distribution in the U.K., Ireland, Australia, New Zealand, South Africa, France, Germany, Austria, Switzerland, Italy, Eastern Europe, the CIS, Scandinavia, the Benelux, Israel and Asia excluding Japan, Korea and Singapore with Universal Pictures only; produced by HanWay Films, Prowess Pictures and Ten Acre Films; distributed in the US by Bleecker Street
February 9, 2024	Lisa Frankenstein	co-production with MXN Entertainment
February 23, 2024	Drive-Away Dolls	co-production with Working Title Films; co-distributed in Japan by Parco; Nominated - GLAAD Media Award for Outstanding Film - Wide Release
March 15, 2024	The American Society of Magical Negroes	co-production with Sight Unseen and Offscreen
April 5, 2024	Housekeeping for Beginners	distribution outside Eastern Europe only; produced by List Production, Madants, Kinorama, Sense Production, Industria Film, Film i Väst, CommonGround Pictures, Causeway Films, Tango Entertainment, and Adelaide Film Festival Investment Fund; co-distributed by Maslow Entertainment in Australia and New Zealand; Queer Lion; Nominated - GLAAD Media Award for Outstanding Film - Limited Release
April 26, 2024	I.S.S.	international distribution with Universal Pictures only; produced by LD Entertainment; distributed in the U.S. by Bleecker Street
May 17, 2024	Back to Black	distribution outside the U.K., Ireland, France, Germany, Austria, Switzerland, Australia, New Zealand, the Benelux, Scandinavia and Poland only; produced by StudioCanal and Monumental Pictures; co-distributed in Japan by Parco
May 30, 2024	The End We Start From	distribution in Latin America, Australia, New Zealand, Scandinavia, France, Germany, Austria, Switzerland, Spain, Hungary, the Czech Republic, Bulgaria, India, Indonesia, Malaysia and Vietnam with Universal Pictures only; produced by Anton, C2 Motion Picture Group, BBC Film, BFI, SunnyMarch and Hera Pictures; distributed in North America by Republic Pictures and the U.K. and Ireland by Signature Entertainment
June 13, 2024	Problemista	international distribution with Universal Pictures only; produced by A24 and Fruit Tree; co-distributed in Latin America by Cine Caníbal, distributed in North America by A24
June 21, 2024	The Bikeriders	co-production with Regency Enterprises, New Regency and Tri-State Pictures; co-distributed in Japan by Parco
July 4, 2024	MaXXXine	international distribution outside Russia and Japan with Universal Pictures only; produced by A24 and Motel Mojave; co-distributed in Italy by Lucky Red and in France by Condor Distribution, distributed in North America by A24
July 12, 2024	Touch	distribution outside Iceland only; produced by RVK Studios and Good Chaos; co-distributed in France by Condor Distribution and in Japan by Parco
July 26, 2024	Dìdi	distribution only; produced by Antigravity Academy, Spark Features, Unapologetic Projects and Maiden Voyage Pictures; co-distributed in France by Condor Distribution
August 23, 2024	Cuckoo	select international distribution with Universal Pictures only; produced by Neon, Waypoint Entertainment and Fiction Park; co-distributed in Latin America by Cine Caníbal, distributed in North America by Neon
August 29, 2024	Shaun of the Dead	20th anniversary re-release; distribution outside France only; produced by StudioCanal, Working Title Films, WT^{2} Productions and Big Talk Productions; originally distributed in the U.S. by Rogue Pictures
October 4, 2024	A Different Man	international distribution outside Latin America, Australia, New Zealand, France, Spain, Portugal, the Benelux, Scandinavia, Poland, Romania, former Yugoslavia, the CIS, China, Hong Kong, Taiwan and Japan with Universal Pictures only; produced by A24, Killer Films and Grand Motel Films; co-distributed in Italy by Lucky Red, distributed in North America by A24
October 11, 2024	Piece by Piece	distribution only; produced by Lego System A/S, I Am Other, and Tremolo Productions; co-distributed in Japan by Parco
October 25, 2024	Conclave	U.S. distribution only; produced by FilmNation Entertainment, Indian Paintbrush and House Productions; BAFTA Award for Best Film; BAFTA Award for Outstanding British Film; Nominated - Academy Award for Best Picture; Nominated - Critics' Choice Movie Award for Best Picture; Nominated - Golden Globe Award for Best Motion Picture – Drama; Nominated - Satellite Award for Best Motion Picture – Drama
October 25, 2024	The Front Room	international distribution outside France, Italy, Spain, Portugal, Poland, Romania, former Yugoslavia, the CIS, China, Hong Kong, Taiwan and Japan with Universal Pictures only; produced by A24, 2AM and Two & Two Pictures; distributed in North America by A24
November 1, 2024	Anora	international distribution outside France, Israel, Russia, Australia and New Zealand with Universal Pictures only; produced by FilmNation Entertainment and Cre Film; co-distributed in Japan by Bitters End, distributed in North America by Neon; Academy Award for Best Picture; Critics' Choice Movie Award for Best Picture; Independent Spirit Award for Best Feature; Palme d'Or; Satellite Award for Best Motion Picture – Musical or Comedy; Nominated - BAFTA Award for Best Film; Nominated - Golden Globe Award for Best Motion Picture – Musical or Comedy; Nominated - Toronto International Film Festival People's Choice Award
December 25, 2024	Nosferatu	co-production with Maiden Voyage Pictures, Birch Hill Road Entertainment and Studio 8; co-distributed in Japan by Parco
January 23, 2025	The Brutalist	international distribution with Universal Pictures only; produced by Andrew Lauren Productions, Yellow Bear, Brookstreet Pictures, Intake Films, Killer Films, Protagonist Pictures, Three Six Zero Group, and Proton Cinema; co-distributed in Japan by Parco, distributed in the U.S. by A24; Golden Globe Award for Best Motion Picture – Drama; Satellite Award for Best Motion Picture – Drama; Nominated - Academy Award for Best Picture; Nominated - BAFTA Award for Best Film; Nominated - Critics' Choice Movie Award for Best Picture; Nominated - Golden Lion
February 28, 2025	Last Breath	distribution in the U.S., France, Scandinavia, Australia, New Zealand, China, Indonesia, Malaysia, Korea and Vietnam only; produced by Longshot Films, Dark Castle Entertainment, FilmNation Entertainment and Early Bird Productions
March 14, 2025	Black Bag	co-production with Casey Silver Productions; co-distributed in Japan by Parco
March 28, 2025	The Ballad of Wallis Island	distribution only; produced by Baby Cow Productions; co-distributed in Latin America by Cine Caníbal; Nominated - BAFTA Award for Outstanding British Film; Nominated - Critics' Choice Movie Award for Best Comedy
April 7, 2025	Love Me	select international distribution with Universal Pictures only; produced by ShivHans Pictures, 2AM and AgX; distributed in the U.S. by Bleecker Street and ShivHans Pictures
April 25, 2025	The Friend	international distribution with Universal Pictures only; produced by 3dot Productions and Big Creek; co-distributed by Maslow Entertainment in Australia and New Zealand, distributed in North America by Bleecker Street
May 30, 2025	The Phoenician Scheme	distribution only; produced by American Empirical Pictures, Indian Paintbrush and Studio Babelsberg; co-distributed in Latin America by Cine Caníbal and in Japan by Parco; Nominated - Critics' Choice Movie Award for Best Comedy
August 21, 2025	Eddington	international distribution outside France, Germany, Austria, Switzerland, Italy, Scandinavia, the CIS, the Middle East, China, Hong Kong, Taiwan and Japan with Universal Pictures only; produced by A24 and Square Peg; co-distributed in Latin America by Cine Caníbal; distributed in North America by A24
August 22, 2025	Honey Don't!	co-production with Working Title Films
September 12, 2025	Downton Abbey: The Grand Finale	co-production with Carnival Films; co-distributed in Japan by GAGA; Nominated - GLAAD Media Award for Outstanding Film - Wide Release
October 3, 2025	Anemone	co-production with Plan B Entertainment
October 24, 2025	Bugonia	distribution outside Korea only; produced by Square Peg, CJ ENM, Fruit Tree and Element Pictures; co-distributed in Japan by GAGA; Nominated - Academy Award for Best Picture; Nominated - Critics' Choice Movie Award for Best Picture; Nominated - Golden Globe Award for Best Motion Picture – Musical or Comedy; Nominated - Golden Lion
November 26, 2025	Hamnet	distribution outside India, Portugal, former Yugoslavia and Albania only; produced by Amblin Entertainment, Hera Pictures, Neal Street Productions and Book of Shadows; co-distributed in Japan by Parco; BAFTA Award for Outstanding British Film; Golden Globe Award for Best Motion Picture – Drama; Toronto International Film Festival People's Choice Award; Nominated - Academy Award for Best Picture; Nominated - BAFTA Award for Best Film; Nominated - Critics' Choice Movie Award for Best Picture
November 27, 2025	Lurker	international distribution with Universal Pictures only; produced by MeMo Films, High Frequency Entertainment, Adler Entertainment, Arts & Sciences, TWIN and Case Study Films; distributed in North America by Mubi
December 18, 2025	The History of Sound	international distribution with Universal Pictures only; produced by Film4, End Cue, Fat City, Tango Entertainment, Closer Media and Storm City Films; co-distributed in Latin America by Cine Caníbal, distributed in North America by Mubi; Nominated - GLAAD Media Award for Outstanding Film - Wide Release
December 25, 2025	Song Sung Blue	co-production with Davis Entertainment; co-distributed in Japan by GAGA
January 30, 2026	Rabbit Trap	distribution in the U.K., Ireland, Latin America, South Africa, Scandinavia, the Benelux, Korea, Singapore, Malaysia, the Philippines, Vietnam and Turkey with Universal Pictures only; produced by Bankside Films, SpectreVision, Mad as Birds, Align and Minor Realm Studios; co-distributed in the U.K. and Ireland by Picturehouse Entertainment, distributed in North America by Magnet Releasing
February 6, 2026	Hamlet	international distribution with Universal Pictures only; produced by BBC Film, BFI, Waypoint Entertainment, Left Handed Films and Storyteller Films; distributed in North America by Vertical
February 20, 2026	Midwinter Break	co-production with Film4, the Netherlands Film Fund, Film Scotland, Shoebox Films and Family Affair Films; co-distributed in Australia and New Zealand by Maslow Entertainment
March 27, 2026	The AI Doc: Or How I Became an Apocaloptimist	distribution only; produced by Playgrounds, Cottage M and Fishbowl Films
April 17, 2026	Lorne	distribution only; produced by Tremolo Productions
May 15, 2026	Obsession	co-distribution outside France, Australia, New Zealand and the CIS with Blumhouse Productions only; produced by Capstone Pictures, Tea Shop Productions and Under the Shell; co-distributed in Japan by Parco
May 29, 2026	My Mother's Wedding	select international distribution with Universal Pictures only; produced by Indian Paintbrush, Finola Dwyer Productions and Ridlington Road Productions; disitrbuted in North America by Vertical
May 29, 2026	Pressure	distribution in North and Latin America, the Middle East and select Asian territories only; produced by StudioCanal and Working Title Films
June 19, 2026	Girls Like Girls	co-production with Marc Platt Productions and BuzzFeed Studios
August 14, 2026	Six The Musical Live!	North American distribution only
August 21, 2026	Hot Spot	distribution outside Poland, Greece, Cyprus and France only; produced by Madants, Neda Film, Film i Väst, Zentropa, Canal+ Polska and Moderator Inwestycje
August 28, 2026 (Note: Released on May 21, 2026 in Australia, and May 22 in the UK)	Finding Emily	co-production with Working Title Films and Parkville Pictures
September 4, 2026	The Incomer	international distribution with Universal Pictures only; produced by the British Film Institute, Day Zero Productions, Keeper Pictures, Little Walnut Productions, Pilea Pictures and Screen Scotland; distributed in North America by Sumerian Pictures
September 10, 2026	The Uprising	North American distribution only; produced by Blumhouse Atomic Monster, Thank You Pictures, Supernix, Electric Shadow and FilmNation Entertainment
October 16, 2026 (Note: Released on September 25, 2026 in the UK)	Sense and Sensibility	co-production with Working Title Films and November Pictures
October 28, 2026	Hope	French, Benelux and South African distribution with Universal Pictures only; produced by Plus M Entertainment and Forged Films; distributed in North America, the U.K., Ireland, Australia and New Zealand by Neon
October 30, 2026	I Love Boosters	international distribution with Universal Pictures only; produced by Neon, Ryder Picture Company, Annapurna Pictures, Waypoint Entertainment and Savage Rose Films; distributed in North America by Neon
November 20, 2026	Elsinore	North and Latin American distribution excluding airlines only; produced by StudioCanal, LD Entertainment, Lucky Red and Magnolia Mae Films; Toronto International Film Festival International People's Choice Award
November 20, 2026	A Talent for Murder	select international distribution with Universal Pictures only; produced by FilmNation Entertainment, LD Entertainment, Lucky Red, Brouhaha Entertainment, Lunar Pictures and Zurich Avenue

== Upcoming ==
Release date	Film title	Notes	Production Status
December 25, 2026	Werwulf	co-production with Working Title Films and Maiden Voyage Pictures	Completed
April 2, 2027	Play House	co-distribution with Blumhouse Atomic only; produced by Skinny Ghost, Chroma and Divide/Conquer	Completed
May 7, 2027	Anything but Ghosts	distribution only; produced by Blumhouse Atomic, Spooky Pictures, Divide/Conquer, Image Nation Abu Dhabi and That's a Bad Idea	Post-production

=== Undated films ===
Release date	Film title	Notes	Production Status
2027	42.6 Years	co-production with Party Over Here	Post-production
2027	The Bell Jar	U.S. distribution only; co-production with StudioCanal, Plan B Entertainment and Joy Coalition	Post-production
2027	Brides	select international distribution with Universal Pictures only; produced by Likely Story; distributed in North America by Neon	Post-production
2027	King Snake	international distribution with Universal Pictures only; produced by FilmNation Entertainment and Tri-State Pictures; distributed in the U.S. by Neon	Post-production
2027	The Sun Never Sets	international distribution outside Latin America, Eastern Europe, Italy, Portugal, Scandinavia, the Middle East, Turkey and airlines with Universal Pictures only; produced by Ride the Bull, A Group Project and Three Links Productions	Completed
TBA	Audition	co-production with Hyde Park Entertainment and Mario Kassar Productions	In development
TBA	Death of a Salesman	co-production with Amblin Entertainment and Orit Entertainment	In development
TBA	The Fisherman	co-production with Platinum Dunes and Coin Operated	In development
TBA	Occupant	distribution only; produced by Blumhouse Atomic, Divide/Conquer, Spooky Pictures and Closer Media	Filming
TBA	Old Friends New Friends	co-production with Oddball Entertainment	Filming
TBA	Outside Man	co-production with Teton Ridge Entertainment and Cube Vision	Filming
TBA	Romeo and Juliet		Pre-production
TBA	Stages	international distribution with Universal Pictures only; produced by DNA Films and Agile Films; distributed in North America by A24	Filming
TBA	X Crucior		In development
