= Philip Haas =

American film director

- Born: 1954 (age 71–72)
- Known for: art and filmmaking
- Notable work: Winter (after Arcimboldo); Angels and Insects

Philip Haas (born 1954) is an American artist, screenwriter and filmmaker, perhaps best known for his 2012 sculpture exhibition "The Four Seasons" and his 1995 film Angels and Insects.

He began his career as a documentary film maker, directing ten profiles of unusual artists through the early 1990s with the theme "Magicians of the Earth," commissioned by the Centre Georges Pompidou.

His feature films include Angels and Insects, set in Victorian England, which was nominated for an Academy Award and the Cannes Film Festival Palme d'Or, Up at the Villa, an adaptation of the W. Somerset Maugham novella, starring Sean Penn, Anne Bancroft and Kristin Scott Thomas, The Situation, a political thriller set in Iraq, released in 2006, and the highly regarded The Music of Chance (1993).

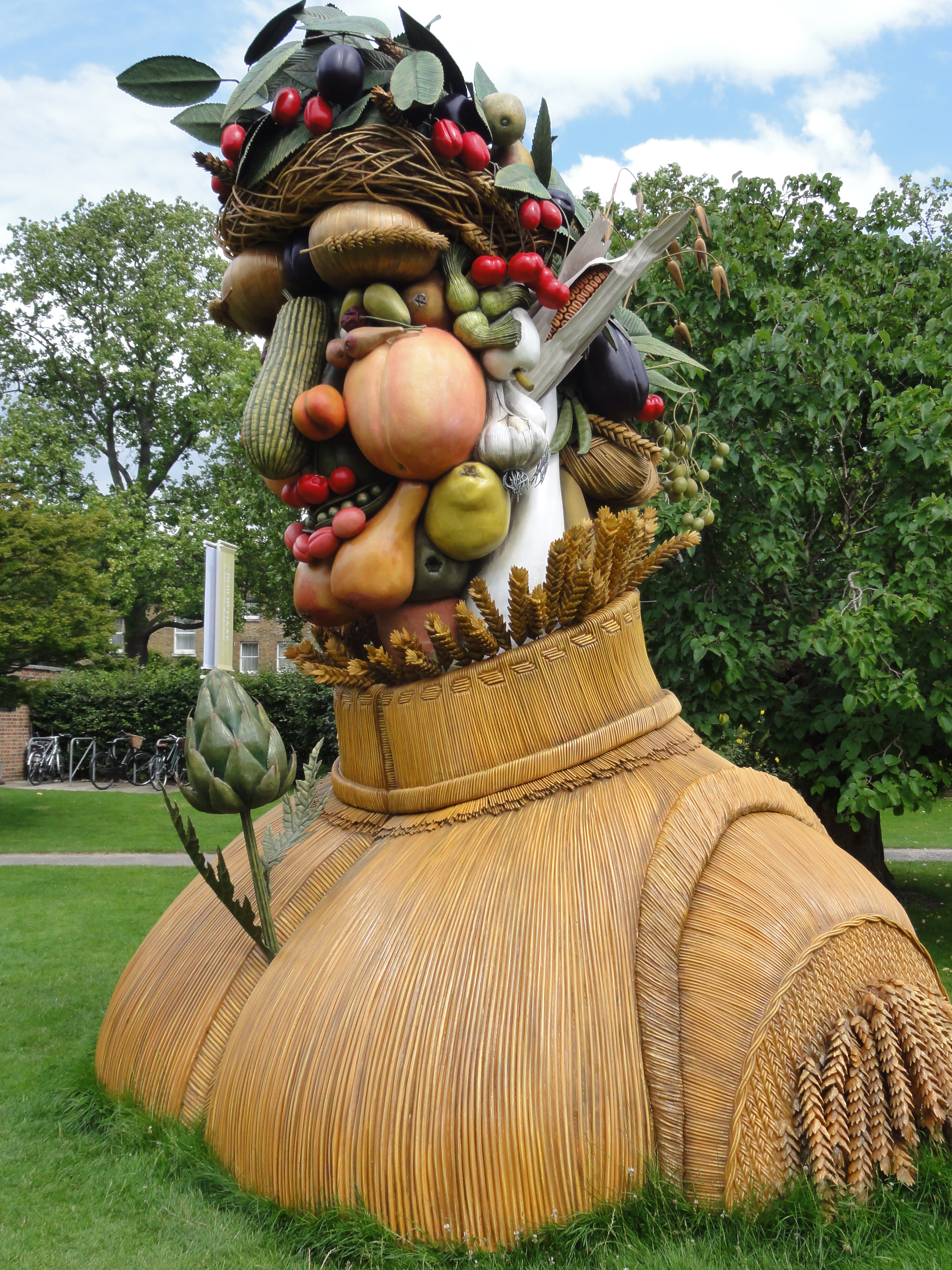
Sculpture from Haas' Four Seasons installation at Dulwich Picture Gallery, 2012, inspired by the works of Giuseppe Arcimboldo

In 2008, the Sonnabend Gallery of New York featured a film installation called The Butcher's Shop, commissioned by the Kimbell Art Museum, in which Haas recreated the space depicted in Annibale Carracci’s 1582 painting of the same name. In 2010, he expanded this series to include works by Ensor and Tiepolo. His exhibition of film installations at the Kimbell Art Museum, "Butchers, Dragons, Gods and Skeletons," was listed by TIME magazine as one of the top ten museum shows of 2009

Retrospectives of his art films have been held at the Tate Gallery in London, the Centre Georges Pompidou in Paris, Lincoln Center in New York, the Museum of Fine Arts, Boston, and the National Gallery of Art in Washington, D.C. He received a Guggenheim Fellowship for this body of work. He has taught in the Visual Arts Program at Princeton University. In 2008 and 2010, he had one-man shows of paintings and film installations at the Sonnabend Gallery. in New York City. Haas's monumental fiberglass sculpture Winter (after Arcimboldo) was unveiled in the National Gallery of Art in Washington, D.C., in September, 2010, before traveling in 2011 to the Piazza del Duomo in Milan and the Garden of Versailles. In 2012, in a spectacular transformation that is typical of his work, Haas created a group of large-scale, fifteen-foot-high, fibre-glass sculptures, inspired by Giuseppe Arcimboldo's Renaissance paintings of the four seasons, comprising Spring, Summer, Autumn, and including Winter. The colossal size of Haas's sculpture accentuates the visual puzzle of natural forms—flowers, ivy, moss, fungi, vegetables, fruit, trees, bark, branches, twigs, leaves—as they are recycled to form four human portraits, each representing an individual season. The result is at once earthy, fanciful and exuberant—a commentary on Arcimboldo's style and a work of art in its own right. These sculptures were first seen in the garden of the Dulwich Picture Gallery in the United Kingdom in the summer of 2012, before embarking on a permanent tour of museums and botanical gardens across the world. So far being seen in France, Italy and the United States of America. Winter on its own presented in seventeen venues; Four Seasons together in fourteen, making it one of the longest touring works of contemporary sculpture on record.

In 2023, the Museum Flehite held a monumental retrospective of Haas’s work titled “Sculpture Breathes Life”.
