= Anne Bancroft =

American actress (1931–2005)

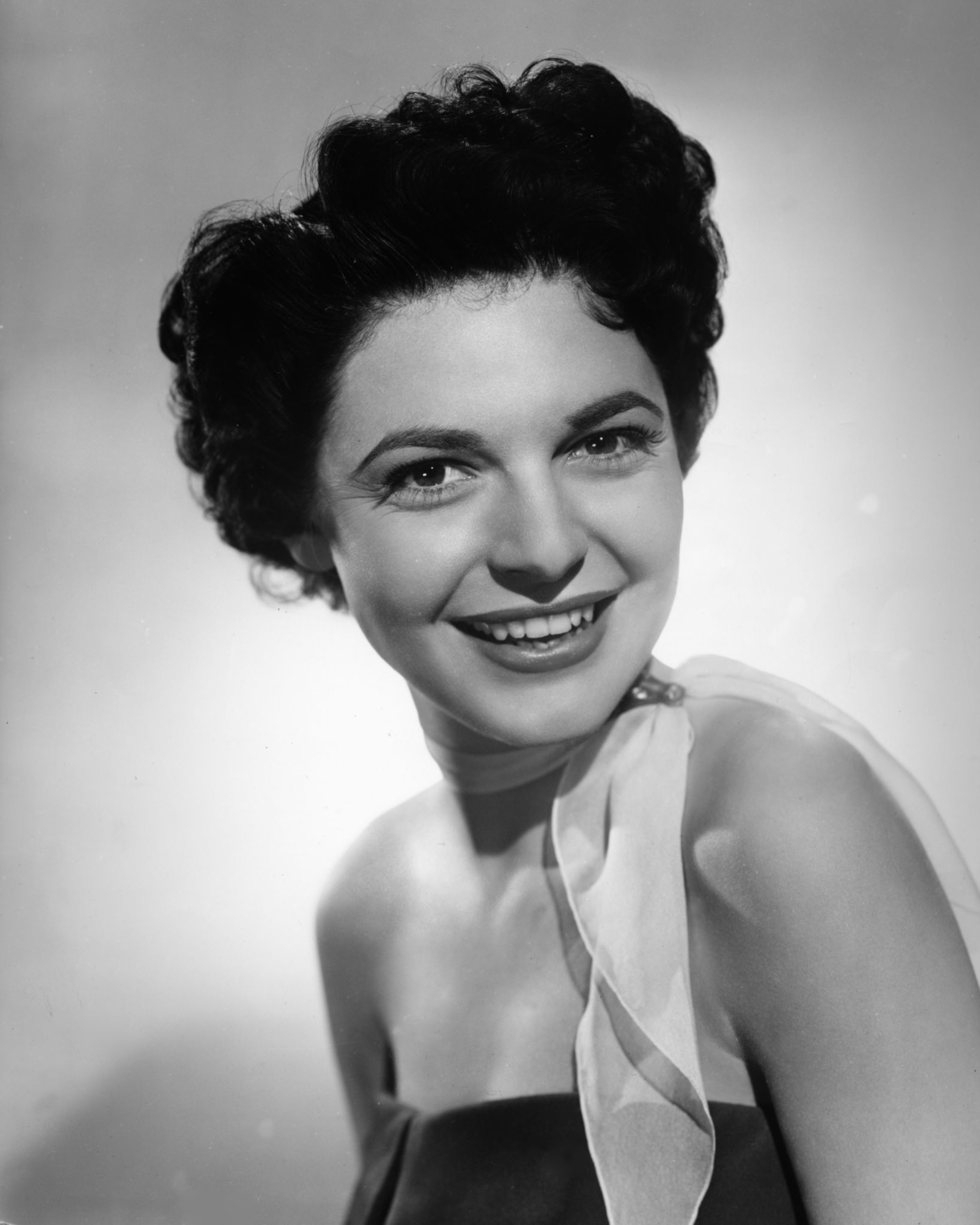
- Bancroft in 1952
- Born: Anna Maria Louisa Italiano; September 17, 1931; New York City, U.S.
- Died: June 6, 2005 (aged 73); New York City, U.S.
- Resting place: Kensico Cemetery
- Other name: Anne Marno
- Education: HB Studio; American Academy of Dramatic Arts; Actors Studio
- Occupation: Actress
- Years active: 1951–2005
- Spouses: Martin May (m. 1953; div. 1957); Mel Brooks (m. 1964)
- Children: Max Brooks

Anne Bancroft (born Anna Maria Louisa Italiano; September 17, 1931 – June 6, 2005) was an American actress. Respected for her acting prowess and versatility, Bancroft received an Academy Award, three BAFTA Awards, two Golden Globe Awards, two Tony Awards, two Primetime Emmy Awards, and a Cannes Film Festival Award. She is one of 24 thespians to achieve the Triple Crown of Acting.

Associated with the method acting technique, having studied under Lee Strasberg at the Actors Studio, Bancroft made her film debut in the noir thriller Don't Bother to Knock in 1952, and appeared in 14 other films over the following five years. In 1958, she made her Broadway debut with the play Two for the Seesaw, winning the Tony Award for Best Featured Actress in a Play. The next year she portrayed Anne Sullivan in the original Broadway production of The Miracle Worker, winning the Tony Award for Best Actress in a Play. After her continued success on stage, Bancroft's film career was revived when she was cast in the acclaimed film adaptation of The Miracle Worker (1962) for which she won the Academy Award for Best Actress. Her film career progressed with Oscar nominated performances in The Pumpkin Eater (1964), The Graduate (1967), The Turning Point (1977), and Agnes of God (1985).

Bancroft continued to act in the later half of her life, with prominent roles including Mary Magdalene in Franco Zeffirelli's Jesus of Nazareth (1977), The Elephant Man (1980), To Be or Not to Be (1983), Garbo Talks (1984), 84 Charing Cross Road (1987), Torch Song Trilogy (1988), Home for the Holidays (1995), G.I. Jane (1997), Great Expectations (1998), and Up at the Villa (2000). She had received multiple Primetime Emmy Award nominations, including for the television films Broadway Bound (1992), Deep in My Heart (1999), for which she won, and The Roman Spring of Mrs. Stone (2003). She died in 2005, at the age of 73, as a result of uterine cancer. She was married to director, actor, and writer Mel Brooks, with whom she had a son, author Max Brooks.

== Early life and education ==
Bancroft was born Anna Maria Louisa Italiano on September 17, 1931, in the Bronx, New York, the middle of three daughters of Mildred Carmela (née Di Napoli; 1907–2010), a telephone operator, and Michael Gregory Italiano (1905–2001), a dress pattern maker. Her parents were children of Italian immigrants from Muro Lucano, Basilicata. She grew up Roman Catholic.

Bancroft was raised in Little Italy, in the Belmont neighborhood of the Bronx, attended P.S. 12, later moving to 1580 Zerega Ave. and graduating from Christopher Columbus High School in 1948. She then attended HB Studio, the American Academy of Dramatic Arts, the Actors Studio and the American Film Institute's Directing Workshop for Women at the University of California, Los Angeles. After appearing in a number of live television dramas, including Studio One and The Goldbergs under the name Anne Marno, later, at Darryl Zanuck's insistence, she chose the less foreign-sounding surname of Bancroft "because it sounded dignified".

== Career ==
=== 1952–1962: Initial work and breakthrough ===
Bancroft made her screen debut with a major role in the 1952 Marilyn Monroe-led psychological thriller Don't Bother to Knock. She appeared in 14 films over the next five years, including Treasure of the Golden Condor (1953), Gorilla at Large (1954), Demetrius and the Gladiators (1954), New York Confidential (1955) and Walk the Proud Land (1956).

After three weeks of location work on The Last Hunt (1955), a horse got out of control causing Bancroft to land hard on the horn of her saddle. Due to hospitalization she was replaced as the Native American girl by Debra Paget; although some of her long-distance shots were retained in finished film.

In 1957, Bancroft was directed by Jacques Tourneur in a David Goodis adaptation, Nightfall. In 1958, she made her Broadway debut as lovelorn, Bronx-accented Gittel Mosca opposite Henry Fonda (as the married man Gittel loves) in William Gibson's two-character play Two for the Seesaw, directed by Arthur Penn. For the role, she won the Tony Award for Best Featured Actress in a Play.

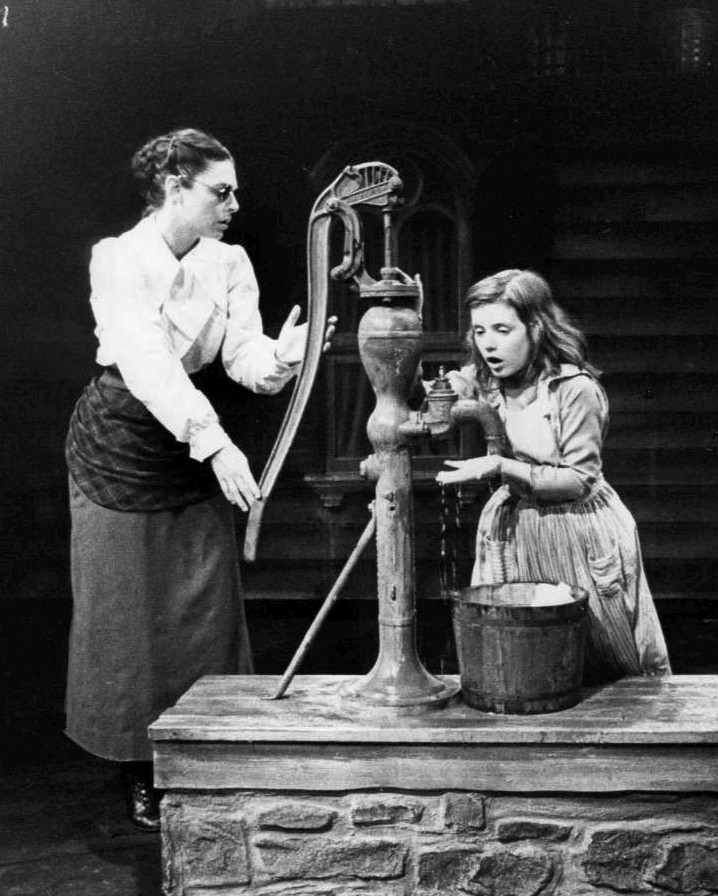
Bancroft (left) with Patty Duke in the stage production of The Miracle Worker, 1960

Bancroft won the Tony Award for Best Actress in a Play in 1960, again with playwright Gibson and director Penn, when she played Annie Sullivan, the young woman who teaches the child Helen Keller to communicate in The Miracle Worker. She reprised her role in the 1962 film and won the Academy Award for Best Actress, with Patty Duke repeating her own success as Keller alongside Bancroft. As Bancroft had returned to Broadway to star in Mother Courage and Her Children, Joan Crawford accepted the Oscar on her behalf and later presented the award to her in New York.

=== 1963–1985: Success, decline and comeback ===
Bancroft co-starred as a medieval nun obsessed with a priest (Jason Robards) in the 1965 Broadway production of John Whiting's play The Devils. Produced by Alexander H. Cohen and directed by Michael Cacoyannis, it ran for 63 performances.

Annie's a very gutsy girl. I swear I wouldn't hesitate to put her in at shortstop for the New York Yankees.

— Arthur Penn
director of The Miracle Worker

Bancroft received a second nomination for the Academy Award for Best Actress for her performance in The Pumpkin Eater (1964). Bancroft achieved stardom when she played the starring role as Mrs. Robinson in the romantic comedy-drama The Graduate (1967). In the film, she played an unhappily married woman who seduces the son of her husband's law firm partner, the much younger recent college graduate played by Dustin Hoffman. In the film, Hoffman's character later dates and falls in love with her daughter. Bancroft was ambivalent about her appearance in The Graduate; she said in several interviews that the role overshadowed her other work. Despite her character becoming an archetype of the "older woman" role, Bancroft was only 36 years old at the time—just eight years older than her onscreen daughter Katharine Ross and six years older than Hoffman. The film, and her performance, received widespread critical acclaim, earning her a third nomination for the Academy Award for Best Actress. A CBS television special, Annie: The Women in the Life of a Man (1970), won Bancroft an Emmy Award for her singing and acting.

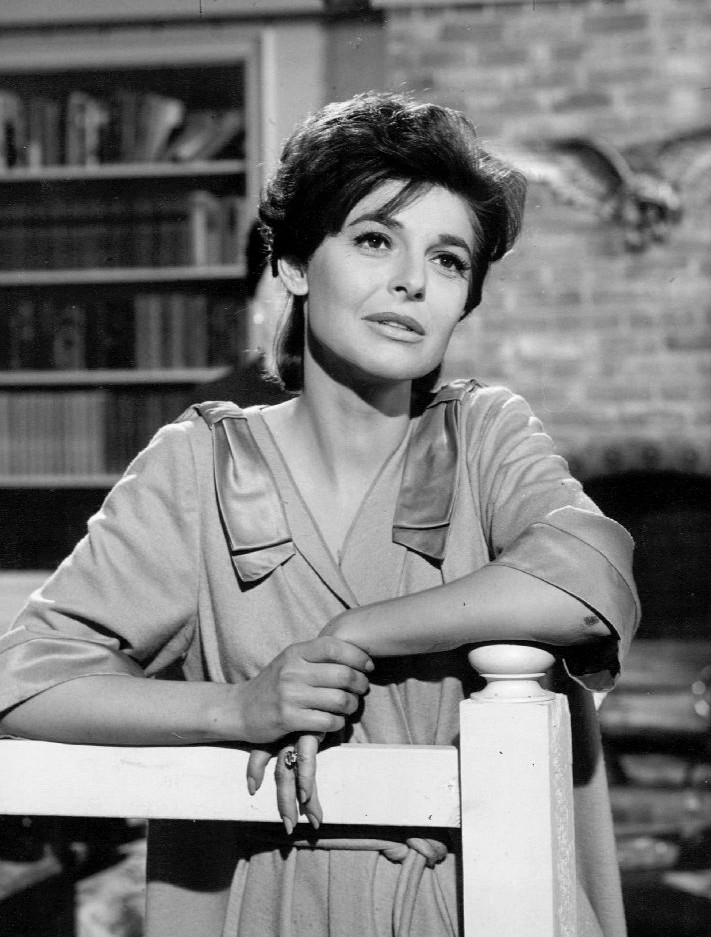
Bancroft in the television show Bob Hope Presents the Chrysler Theatre, 1964

Bancroft is one of ten actors to have won both an Academy Award and a Tony Award for the same role (as Annie Sullivan in The Miracle Worker), and one of very few entertainers to win an Oscar, an Emmy and a Tony award. This rare achievement is also known as the Triple Crown of Acting. She followed that success with a second television special, Annie and the Hoods (1974), which was telecast on ABC and featured her husband Mel Brooks as a guest star. She made an uncredited cameo in the film Blazing Saddles (1974), directed by Brooks. She made a career comeback with the ballet drama The Turning Point (1977), followed by the neo-noir mystery film Agnes of God (1985), which earned her two nominations for the Academy Award for Best Actress.

Bancroft made her debut as a screenwriter and director in Fatso (1980), in which she starred with Dom DeLuise.

Bancroft was the original choice to play Joan Crawford in the film Mommie Dearest (1981), but backed out and was replaced by Faye Dunaway. She was also a front-runner for the role of Aurora Greenway in Terms of Endearment (1983), but declined so that she could act in the remake of To Be or Not to Be (1983) with Brooks. In 1988, she played Harvey Fierstein's mother in the film version of his play Torch Song Trilogy.

=== 1986–2005: Final film and television roles ===
During the 1990s and early 2000s, Bancroft took supporting roles in a number of films in which she co-starred with major film stars, including Honeymoon in Vegas (1992), Love Potion No. 9 (1992), Malice (1993), Point of No Return (1993), Home for the Holidays (1995), How to Make an American Quilt (1995), G.I. Jane (1997), Great Expectations (1998), Keeping the Faith (2000), Up at the Villa (2000) and Heartbreakers (2001). She lent her voice to the animated film Antz (1998).

Bancroft also starred in several television movies and miniseries, receiving six Emmy Award nominations (winning once for herself and shared for Annie, The Women in the Life of a Man), eight Golden Globe nominations (winning twice) and two Screen Actors Guild Awards. Her last appearance was as herself in a 2004 episode of HBO's Curb Your Enthusiasm. She was cast in Spanglish (2004) later in the year, but had to bow out due to a medical emergency. Her last project was the animated feature film Delgo, released posthumously in 2008. The film was dedicated to her.

Bancroft received a star on the Hollywood Walk of Fame at 6368 Hollywood Boulevard for her work in television. At the time of her star's installation in 1960, she had recently appeared in several TV series. She was also a member of the American Theater Hall of Fame, having been inducted in 1992.

== Personal life ==
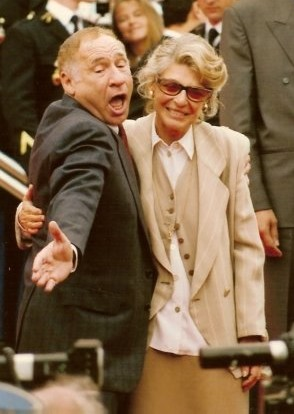
Bancroft with husband Mel Brooks at the 1991 Cannes Film Festival

Bancroft's first husband was lawyer Martin May, of Lubbock, Texas. They married on July 1, 1953, separated in November 1955, and divorced on February 13, 1957. She had previously been engaged to actor John Ericson in 1951. Lee Marvin's ex-wife Betty claimed in her 2010 book Tales of a Hollywood Housewife that Marvin had an affair with Bancroft when they co-starred in Gorilla at Large (1954) and A Life in the Balance (1955).

In 1961, Bancroft met Mel Brooks at a rehearsal for Perry Como's variety show Kraft Music Hall. Bancroft and Brooks married on August 5, 1964, at the Manhattan Marriage Bureau near New York City Hall, and remained married until her death in 2005. Their son, Max Brooks, was born in 1972. Bancroft worked with her husband three times on the screen: dancing a tango in Brooks's Silent Movie (1976), in his remake of To Be or Not to Be (1983) and in the episode titled "Opening Night" (2004) of the HBO show Curb Your Enthusiasm. The couple also appeared in Dracula: Dead and Loving It (1995), but never appeared together again. Brooks produced the film The Elephant Man (1980), in which Bancroft acted. He was executive producer for the film 84 Charing Cross Road (1987) in which she starred. Both Brooks and Bancroft appeared in Season 6 of The Simpsons. According to the DVD commentary, when Bancroft came to record her lines for the episode "Fear of Flying", the Simpsons writers asked if Brooks had come with her (which he had); she joked, "I can't get rid of him!"

In a 2010 interview, Brooks credited Bancroft as being the guiding force behind his involvement in developing The Producers and Young Frankenstein for the musical theater. In the same interview, he said of their first meeting in 1961, "From that day, until her death on June 6, 2005, we were glued together." Bancroft's son, Max, said in a 2020 interview that she was "a secret, closet scientist". He said that, as a child, she read to him Paul de Kruif's Microbe Hunters (1926) as a bedtime story.

In 2005, shortly before her death, Bancroft became a grandmother when her daughter-in-law Michelle had a boy, Henry Michael Brooks.

Early in her career, Bancroft battled depression and drank frequently, which resulted in her being absent from work, according to Elizabeth Wilson, who was Bancroft's understudy in The Little Foxes. She also worked with Bancroft in The Graduate (1967) and The Prisoner of Second Avenue (1975).

== Death ==
Bancroft died of uterine cancer at age 73 on June 6, 2005, at Mount Sinai Hospital in Manhattan. Her death surprised many, including some of her friends, as the intensely private Bancroft had not disclosed any details of her illness. Her body was interred at Kensico Cemetery in Valhalla, New York, near her father; her mother would die five years after Bancroft in April 2010 at the age of 102 and be buried with her family. Her final film, Delgo, was dedicated to her memory.

== Acting credits ==
=== Film ===
Year	Title	Role	Notes	Ref.
1952	Don't Bother to Knock	Lyn Lesley	Film debut (singing voice provided by Eve Marley)	
1953	Tonight We Sing	Emma Hurok		
1953	Treasure of the Golden Condor	Marie, Comtesse de St. Malo		
1953	The Kid from Left Field	Marian Foley		
1954	Gorilla at Large	Laverne Miller		
1954	Demetrius and the Gladiators	Paula		
1954	The Raid	Katy Bishop		
1955	New York Confidential	Katherine "Kathy" Lupo		
1955	A Life in the Balance	María Ibinia		
1955	The Naked Street	Rosalie Regalzyk		
1955	The Last Frontier	Corinna Marston		
1956	Walk the Proud Land	Tianay		
1956	Nightfall	Marie Gardner		
1957	The Restless Breed	Angelita		
1957	The Girl in Black Stockings	Beth Dixon		
1962	The Miracle Worker	Anne Sullivan	Academy Award for Best Actress	
1964	The Pumpkin Eater	Jo Armitage	Cannes Film Festival Award for Best Actress	
1965	The Slender Thread	Inga Dyson		
1966	7 Women	Dr. D.R. Cartwright		
1967	The Graduate	Mrs. Robinson		
1972	Young Winston	Lady Randolph Churchill		
1974	Blazing Saddles	Woman in Church Congregation	Uncredited extra	
1975	The Prisoner of Second Avenue	Edna Edison		
1975	The Hindenburg	Ursula von Reugen		
1975	Urban Living: Funny and Formidable	Herself	Short film	
1976	Lipstick	Carla Bondi		
1976	Silent Movie	Herself		
1976	The August	Director	Short film; also writer and editor	
1977	The Turning Point	Emma Jacklin		
1980	Fatso	Antoinette	Also director and writer	
1980	The Elephant Man	Madge Kendal		
1983	To Be or Not to Be	Anna Bronski		
1984	Garbo Talks	Estelle Rolfe		
1985	Agnes of God	Mother Miriam Ruth / Anna Maria Burchetti		
1986	'night, Mother	Thelma Cates		
1987	84 Charing Cross Road	Helene Hanff		
1988	Torch Song Trilogy	Ma Beckoff		
1989	Bert Rigby, You're a Fool	Meredith Perlestein		
1992	Honeymoon in Vegas	Bea Singer		
1992	Love Potion No. 9	Madame Ruth		
1993	Point of No Return	Amanda		
1993	Malice	Mrs. Kennsinger		
1993	Mr. Jones	Dr. Catherine Holland		
1995	How to Make an American Quilt	Older Glady Joe Cleary		
1995	Home for the Holidays	Adele Larson		
1995	Dracula: Dead and Loving It	Madame Ouspenskaya / Gypsy Woman		
1996	The Sunchaser	Dr. Renata Baumbauer		
1997	G.I. Jane	Senator Lillian DeHaven		
1997	Critical Care	Nun		
1998	Great Expectations	Mrs. Dinsmoor		
1998	Mark Twain's America in 3D	Narrator	Documentary film	
1998	Antz	Queen Ant	Voice role	
2000	Up at the Villa	Princess San Ferdinando		
2000	Keeping the Faith	Ruth Schram		
2001	Heartbreakers	Gloria Vogal / Barbara		
2001	In Search of Peace	Golda Meir	Voice role; documentary film	
2008	Delgo	Empress Sedessa	Voice role; posthumous release	

=== Television ===
==== As an actress ====
Year	Title	Role	Notes	Ref.
1950–1951	Studio One in Hollywood	Various roles	Recurring role; 4 episodes	
1951	Suspense	Actress	Episodes: "Night Break" and "A Vision of Death"	
1951	The Ford Theatre Hour	Actress	Episode: "The Golden Mouth"	
1951	The Adventures of Ellery Queen	Actress	Episode: "The Chinese Mummer Mystery"	
1951	Danger	Gangster's Moll / Heidi	Episodes: "The Killer Scarf" and "Murderer's Face"	
1951	The Web	Actress	Episode: "The Customs of the Country"	
1951	Lights Out	Helen Drome	Episode: "The Deal"	
1951	The Goldbergs	Joyce	Recurring role; 3 episodes	
1953	Omnibus	Paco's Sister	Episode: "The Capital of the World"	
1953	Kraft Television Theatre	Actress	Episode: "To Live in Peace"	
1954–1957	Lux Video Theatre	Various roles	5 episodes	
1956–1957	Climax!	Audrey / Elena	Episodes: "Fear Is the Hunter" and "The Mad Bomber"	
1957	Playhouse 90	Isobel Waring / Julie Bickford	Episodes: "So Soon to Die" and "Invitation to a Gunfighter"	
1957	Dick Powell's Zane Grey Theatre	Isabelle Rutledge	Episode: "Episode in Darkness"	
1957	The Alcoa Hour	Alegre / Giselle	Episodes: "Key Largo" and "Hostages to Fortune"	
1958	The Frank Sinatra Show	Carol Welles	Episode: "A Time to Cry"	
1964	Bob Hope Presents the Chrysler Theatre	Faye Benet Garret	Episode: "Out on the Outskirts of Town"	
1967	ABC Stage 67	Virginia	Episode: "I'm Getting Married"	
1970	Annie: The Women in the Life of a Man	Various Characters	Television special	
1977	Jesus of Nazareth	Mary Magdalene	Miniseries; 3 episodes	
1980	Shōgun	Narrator	Miniseries; US version	
1982	Marco Polo	Marco's Mother	Episode: "1.1"	
1990	Freddie and Max	Maxine "Max" Chandler	Main role; 6 episodes	
1992	Broadway Bound	Kate Jerome	Television film	
1992	Mrs. Cage	Lillian Cage	Television film	
1994	Oldest Living Confederate Widow Tells All	Lucy Marsden (age 99–100)	Television film	
1994	Great Performances	Mrs. Fanning	Episode: "Paddy Chayefsky's 'The Mother'"	
1994	The Simpsons	Dr. Zweig	Voice role; Episode: "Fear of Flying"	
1996	Homecoming	Abigail Tillerman	Television film	
1999	Deep in My Heart	Geraldine "Gerry" Eileen Cummins	Television film	
2001	Haven	Mama Gruber	Television film	
2003	The Roman Spring of Mrs. Stone	Contessa	Television film	

==== As herself ====
Year	Title	Role	Notes	Ref.
1960	Person to Person	Herself	Episode: "7.35"	
1960	Gala Adlai on Broadway	Herself / Performer	Television film	
1962	Password All-Stars	Herself	Episode: "Anne Bancroft vs. Robert Goulet"	
1962–1964	What's My Line?	Herself / Mystery Guest	3 episodes	
1969	The Kraft Music Hall	Herself	Episode: "2.23"	
1970	Arthur Penn, 1922–: Themes and Variants	Herself	Television documentary film	
1970	This Is Tom Jones	Herself	Episode: "3.1"	
1974	Annie and the Hoods	Herself / Host	Television film	
1978	The Stars Salute Israel at 30	Herself	Television film	
1978	Lørdagshjørnet	Herself	Episode: "Mel Brooks"	
1978	The Wonderful World of Disney	Herself	Episode: "Mickey's 50"	
1979	The Muppets Go Hollywood	Herself	Television special	
1982	Bob Hope's Women I Love: Beautiful, But Funny	Herself	Television special	
1983	An Audience with Mel Brooks	Herself	Television special	
1998	The Secret World of Antz	Herself	Television documentary film	
1998	Living with Cancer: A Message of Hope	Narrator	Television documentary film	
2000	The Rosie O'Donnell Show	Herself	Episode: "5 May 2000"	
2000	The Living Edens	Narrator	Episode: "Anamalai: India's Elephant Mountain"	
2001	Exhale with Candice Bergen	Herself	Episode: "16 November 2001"	
2004	Curb Your Enthusiasm	Herself	Episode: "Opening Night"	

=== Theater ===
Year	Title	Role	Venue	Notes	Ref.
1958–1959	Two for the Seesaw	Gittel Mosca	Booth Theatre	January 16, 1958 – June 27, 1959	
1959–1961	The Miracle Worker	Annie Sullivan	Playhouse Theatre	October 19, 1959 – February 5, 1961	
1963	Mother Courage and Her Children	Mother Courage	Martin Beck Theatre	March 25, 1963 – May 11, 1963	
1965–1966	The Devils	Sister Jean of the Angels	Broadway Theatre	November 3, 1965 – January 22, 1966	
1967–1968	The Little Foxes	Regina Giddens	Ethel Barrymore Theatre	October 20, 1967 – January 20, 1968	
1968–1969	A Cry of Players	Anne	Vivian Beaumont Theatre	November 14, 1968 – February 15, 1969	
1977–1978	Golda	Golda Meir	Morosco Theatre	November 2, 1977 – February 15, 1978	
1981–1982	Duet for One	Stephanie Abrahams	Royale Theatre	December 7, 1981 – January 2, 1982	
2002	Occupant	Louise Nevelson	Peter Norton Space	Off-Broadway	

== Awards and nominations ==
Year	Association	Category	Work	Result
1958	Tony Awards	Best Featured Actress in a Play	Two for the Seesaw	Won
1959	Tony Awards	Best Actress in a Play	The Miracle Worker	Won
1963	Academy Awards	Best Actress	The Miracle Worker	Won
1963	British Academy Film Awards	Best Foreign Actress	The Miracle Worker	Won
1963	National Board of Review	Best Actress	The Miracle Worker	Won
1963	San Sebastián International Film Festival	Best Actress	The Miracle Worker	Won
1963	Golden Globe Awards	Best Actress – Drama	The Miracle Worker	Nominated
1963	Laurel Awards	Top Female Dramatic Performance	The Miracle Worker	Nominated
1965	Academy Awards	Best Actress	The Pumpkin Eater	Nominated
1965	British Academy Film Awards	Best Foreign Actress	The Pumpkin Eater	Won
1965	Golden Globe Awards	Best Actress – Motion Picture Drama	The Pumpkin Eater	Won
1965	Cannes Film Festival Awards	Best Actress	The Pumpkin Eater	Won
1965	Laurel Awards	Top Female Dramatic Performance	The Pumpkin Eater	Nominated
1968	Academy Awards	Best Actress	The Graduate	Nominated
1968	Golden Globe Awards	Best Actress – Musical or Comedy	The Graduate	Won
1968	Laurel Awards	Top Female Dramatic Performance	The Graduate	Nominated
1969	British Academy Film Awards	Best Actress in a Leading Role	The Graduate	Nominated
1970	Primetime Emmy Awards	Outstanding Variety or Musical Program – Variety and Popular Music	Annie: The Women in the Life of a Man	Won
1973	British Academy Film Awards	Best Actress in a Leading Role	Young Winston	Nominated
1976	British Academy Film Awards	Best Actress in a Leading Role	The Prisoner of Second Avenue	Nominated
1978	Academy Awards	Best Actress	The Turning Point	Nominated
1978	National Board of Review Awards	Best Actress	The Turning Point	Won
1978	Golden Globe Awards	Best Actress – Drama	The Turning Point	Nominated
1978	British Academy Film Awards	Best Actress in a Leading Role	The Turning Point	Nominated
1978	Tony Awards	Best Actress in a Play	Golda	Nominated
1980	Taormina Film Festival	Golden Charybdis Award	Fatso	Nominated
1984	Golden Globe Awards	Best Actress – Musical or Comedy	To Be or Not to Be	Nominated
1985	Golden Globe Awards	Best Actress – Musical or Comedy	Garbo Talks	Nominated
1986	Academy Awards	Best Actress	Agnes of God	Nominated
1986	Golden Globe Awards	Best Actress – Drama	Agnes of God	Nominated
1987	Golden Globe Awards	Best Actress – Drama	'night, Mother	Nominated
1988	British Academy Film Awards	Best Actress in a Leading Role	84 Charing Cross Road	Won
1990	Golden Raspberry Awards	Worst Supporting Actress	Bert Rigby, You're a Fool	Nominated
1992	Primetime Emmy Awards	Outstanding Supporting Actress in a Miniseries or Movie	Broadway Bound	Nominated
1992	Primetime Emmy Awards	Outstanding Lead Actress in a Miniseries or Movie	Mrs. Cage	Nominated
1994	Primetime Emmy Awards	Outstanding Supporting Actress in a Miniseries or Movie	Oldest Living Confederate Widow Tells All	Nominated
1996	Screen Actors Guild Award	Outstanding Cast in a Motion Picture	How to Make an American Quilt	Nominated
1997	Screen Actors Guild Awards	Outstanding Actress in a Miniseries or Television Movie	Homecoming	Nominated
1999	Primetime Emmy Awards	Outstanding Supporting Actress – Miniseries or a Movie	Deep in My Heart	Won
2001	Primetime Emmy Awards	Outstanding Supporting Actress – Miniseries or a Movie	Haven	Nominated
2003	Primetime Emmy Awards	Outstanding Supporting Actress – Miniseries or a Movie	The Roman Spring of Mrs. Stone	Nominated
2004	Screen Actors Guild Awards	Outstanding Actress in a Miniseries or Television Movie	The Roman Spring of Mrs. Stone	Nominated

== See also ==
- List of actors with Academy Award nominations
- List of actors with more than one Academy Award nomination in the acting categories
- List of Primetime Emmy Award winners
- List of Golden Globe winners
