= Boricua's Bond =

- Theatrical release poster
- Directed by: Val Lik
- Written by: Val Lik
- Produced by: Alex Bartkow; Rip Robinson; E. Greg Scheinman; Darryl Simmons; David Turner; Jack Da Silva; Alan Novich; Brooklyn Boys Partners
- Starring: Frankie Negrón; Big Pun; Method Man; Tyson Beckford; Redman; Treach; Sticky Fingaz
- Cinematography: Brendan Flynt
- Edited by: Doug Abel
- Production companies: Big Ones Entertainment; MIA; Mindz in Action; October Films; Rogue Pictures; Working Class Pictures (Universal Pictures / NBCUniversal)
- Distributed by: USA Films
- Release date: June 21, 2000
- Running time: 115 minutes
- Country: United States
- Language: English
- Box office: $11.7 million

Boricua's Bond is a 2000 American drama film written and directed by Val Lik. The film stars Frankie Negrón, Val Lik, Ramses Ignacio, Jorge Gautier, Jesglar Cabral and Robyn Karp. The film was released on June 21, 2000, by USA Films.

== Plot ==
Allen, a white kid, moves into a South Bronx neighborhood with his single mom, and is a victim of constant harassment until Tommy, a local kid, offers friendship. A corrupt cop hits on Allen's mother and, when she rebuffs him, he seeks revenge. Forces beyond Allen and Tommy's control put them in the hands of the criminal justice system and make things even more difficult for the dreams of the young men.

== Cast ==
- Frankie Negrón as Tommy
- Val Lik as Allen
- Ramses Ignacio as Axel
- Jorge Gautier as Wilson
- Jesglar Cabral as Antonio
- Robyn Karp as Susan Miller
- Geovanny Pineda as Avery
- Marco Sorisio as Officer Highlander
- Erica Torres as Christine
- Kaleena Justiniano as Rose
- Jeff Knite as Paco
- Michael '2-Smoove' Demitro as Sammy
- Pietro González as Diner Owner
- Manuel Cabral as Tommy's Father
- Elsa Canals as Tommy's Mother
- Maurice Phillips as Santa
- Edison Torres as Priest
- Vanessa Del Sol as Princess
- Jack "JDS" Da Silva as Blinky
- Footprintz as Seta
- Paul Manion as Detective Chroney
- Sticky Fingaz as Tyler
