= Parco (retailer) =

Department store chain

Parco Co., Ltd.
- Native name: 株式会社パルコ
- Type: Subsidiary
- Industry: Retail
- Founded: Ikebukuro, Toshima, Tokyo, Japan February 13, 1953
- Headquarters: Shibuya First Place Building, 8-16, Shinsencho, Shibuya, Tokyo, Japan 1-28-2, Minami-Ikebukuro, Toshima, Tokyo, Japan (registered)
- Number of locations: 17 stores (2023)
- Key people: Kozo Makiyama (President)
- Revenue: ¥264,840 million (FY2010)
- Operating income: ▲¥9,218 million (FY2010)
- Net income: ▲¥4,400 million (FY2010)
- Total assets: ¥222,135 million (FY2010)
- Total equity: ¥81,868 million (FY2010)
- Owner: J. Front Retailing
- Number of employees: 651 (directly); 2,208 (contract)
- Divisions: Parco Games
- Website: www.parco.co.jp/en/

Parco Co., Ltd. (株式会社パルコ, Kabushiki-gaisha Paruko) is a chain of department stores primarily in Japan. The first store was established in Tokyo on February 13, 1953, and since then the company has opened stores in cities all over Japan.

Parco operates a series of shopping malls, using a hybrid business model that combines retail businesses and real estate, while also undertaking property management and consultant projects on a contract basis.

Parco has hosted permanent stores operated by Nintendo, Sega and Capcom in Tokyo, in addition to numerous pop-up stores and events in collaboration with other games. In 2025, Parco announced the formation of a video game publisher division, Parco Games, which publishes indie games and promotes them in Parco-branded malls.

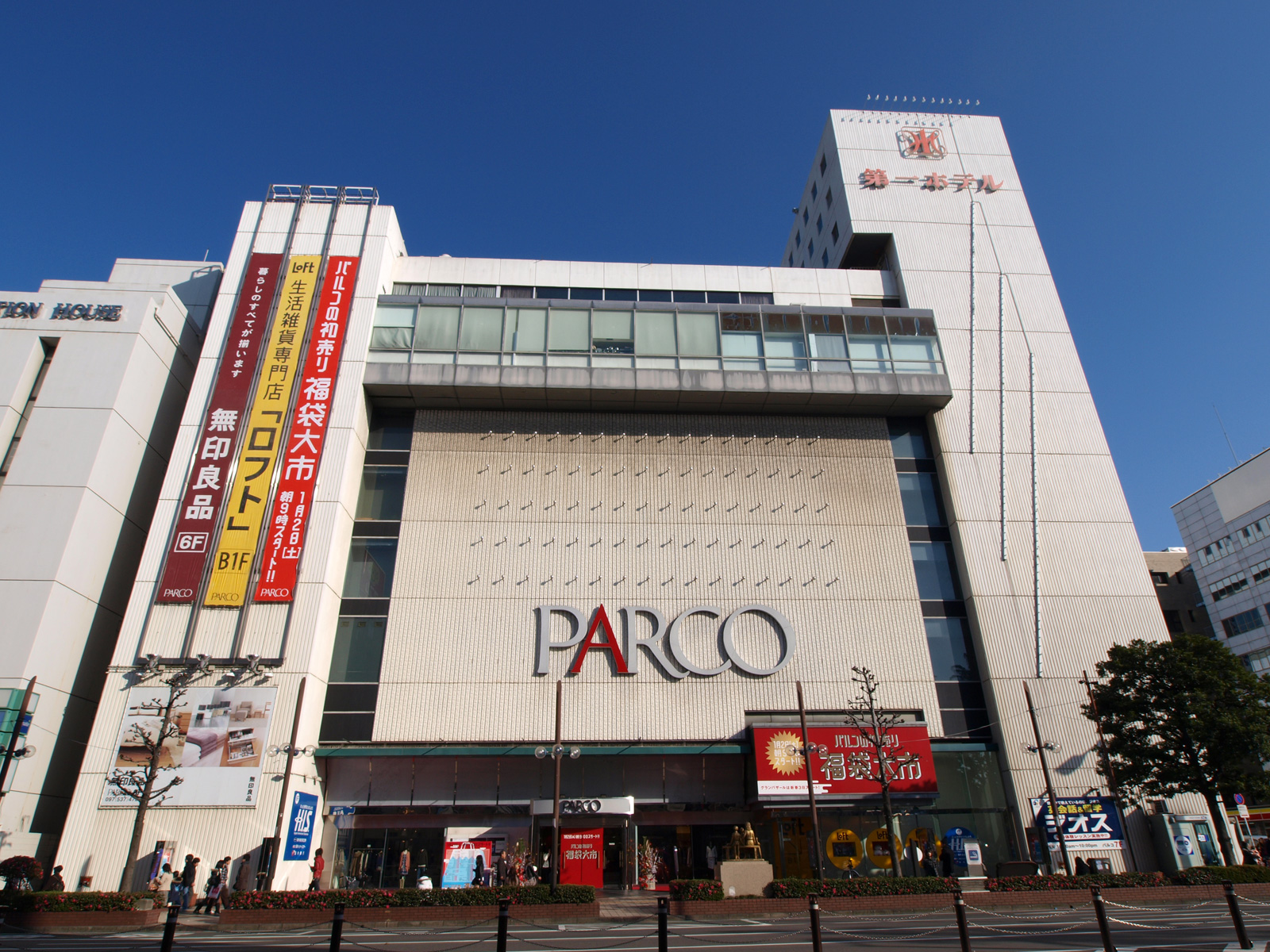
Oita Parco
