= Up at the Villa (film) =

- Film poster
- Directed by: Philip Haas
- Written by: Belinda Haas
- Based on: Up at the Villa by W. Somerset Maugham
- Produced by: Geoff Stier
- Starring: Kristin Scott Thomas; Sean Penn; James Fox; Jeremy Davies; Derek Jacobi; Massimo Ghini; Anne Bancroft
- Cinematography: Maurizio Calvesi
- Edited by: Belinda Haas
- Music by: Pino Donaggio
- Production companies: October Films; Intermedia Films; Mirage Enterprises
- Distributed by: USA Films (United States); Universal Pictures (Select territories, through United International Pictures)
- Release date: 5 May 2000
- Running time: 115 minutes
- Countries: United Kingdom; United States
- Language: English
- Box office: $3.7 million

Up at the Villa is a 2000 romantic drama film directed by Philip Haas and starring Kristin Scott Thomas, Sean Penn, Anne Bancroft, James Fox, Derek Jacobi, and Jeremy Davies. It is based on the 1941 novella Up at the Villa by W. Somerset Maugham.

== Plot ==
A recently widowed Englishwoman, Mary Panton (Kristin Scott Thomas), is staying at the villa of some wealthy friends outside of Florence, Italy in 1938. After meeting her old friend Sir Edgar Swift (James Fox) at a party celebrating the Munich Agreement, she is surprised when he proposes marriage to her the next day. She asks for a few days to think the proposal over, and he agrees to meet with her on his return from Rome.

That evening, at a party hosted by her friend, the Princess San Ferdinando (Anne Bancroft), she meets a married American man named Rowley Flint (Sean Penn), who has a reputation for being a rogue. A violinist (Jeremy Davies) arrives to entertain the guests but is so terrible that the Princess has him removed. Out of sympathy Mary leaves him a large tip. Rowley drives Mary home, but on the way stops at a small church, where she confesses that her husband was an abusive alcoholic who died in a car crash, leaving her destitute. Rowley tries to kiss her but Mary slaps him and drives away. She is so flustered that she almost collides with a young man in the road, who turns out to be the violinist from the restaurant. Seeing that he is poor and hungry, she invites him up to the house for a meal. He tells her that his name is Karl Richter and that he is a refugee from Austria, where he was persecuted for resisting the Nazi government. When the young man declares how beautiful Mary is, she has sex with him out of sympathy. He leaves the next morning.

That same day Mary is summoned to a meeting between the English expatriates and the city authorities, where the local Fascist administrator, Beppino Leopardi (Massimo Ghini), informs them that they will have to register with the police to continue living in Italy. Later that night, she is shocked when Karl appears in her bedroom, declaring that he loves her and wants to be with her. When she explains that she only slept with him out of "pity", he is enraged and attacks her. She grabs a gun given to her by Sir Edgar Swift, but Karl swipes the gun and aims it at her. At the last second, however, he shoots himself. In a blind panic and aware of the serious scandal that could result, Mary calls Rowley and pleads with him to assist her. He arrives and the two transfer the body to the woods down the road, where Rowley plants an unregistered gun of his so that the suicide cannot be traced back to Mary. He keeps Sir Edgar Swift's gun on him.

The next day the two appear to have escaped being connected with the suicide, until Leopardi arrives at Mary's. He announces that the Florence police have arrested Rowley for possessing a handgun belonging to Sir Edgar Swift which was not registered when he entered Italy. Aware that Rowley could be imprisoned and Edgar implicated, Mary seeks out the Princess. She gets the Princess drunk and coaxes her into admitting that she had once blackmailed Leopardi by sending him financial documents showing him to have embezzled money. Mary heads straight for the Princess' home, where she manages to steal the documents on the pretense of delivering flowers.

Mary goes to Leopardi's office and blackmails him with the documents to release Rowley. He is enraged but eventually submits to her demands so that she is able to take a wounded Rowley home. Although she admits to having feelings for Rowley, the two agree that he could not be faithful to her and they part. Later that evening Mary meets with Edgar, where she confesses everything that had occurred over the past few days. He is surprisingly understanding and says that he still wishes to marry her, but that he will have to give up the Viceroyship of India for fear of the story ever getting out and causing a scandal. Mary does not want to ruin his career, and ultimately admits that she does not love him and will not marry him. After he leaves Mary packs her bags to return to London. The Princess arrives at the villa, and tells Mary that she is a fool for rejecting the wealthy and powerful Swift because of her attraction to Rowley.

At the terminal the next day, Mary boards the train alone and is surprised when Rowley joins her in the car. He tells her that he is going to Paris, and the two agree to go together, indicating that they are both going to give the relationship a try.

== Cast ==
- Mary Panton – Kristin Scott Thomas
- Rowley Flint – Sean Penn
- Princess San Ferdinando – Anne Bancroft
- Sir Edgar Swift – James Fox
- Beppino Leopardi – Massimo Ghini
- Karl Richter – Jeremy Davies
- Lucky Leadbetter – Derek Jacobi
- Harold Atkinson – Dudley Sutton
- Colin MacKenzie – Roger Hammond

== Reception ==
The film received mixed reviews from critics. As of May 2025, the film holds a 45% approval rating on Rotten Tomatoes, based on 60 reviews with an average rating of 5.24/10. The website's critics consensus reads: "A poor script and an aimless plot keep this film from engaging the audience." Metacritic, which uses a weighted average, assigned the film a score of 57 out of 100, based on 31 critics, indicating "mixed or average" reviews.

A.O. Scott of The New York Times called it "...a sluggish, literal-minded exercise in vulgar prestige-mongering that flatters itself that it is a contribution to culture."
