= Condo Painting =

- Directed by: John McNaughton
- Written by: John McNaughton; George Condo
- Produced by: Dana Giacchetto
- Starring: George Condo
- Cinematography: John McNaughton
- Edited by: Elena Maganini; Tom Keefe
- Music by: Jim Sampas
- Distributed by: October Films; USA Films
- Release date: March 10, 2000
- Running time: 87 minutes
- Country: United States
- Language: English

Condo Painting is a 2000 American documentary film about George Condo. It was directed by John McNaughton.

== Participants ==
In addition to Condo, the following people appeared in the documentary:

- William S. Burroughs
- Allen Ginsberg
- John Sampas
- Anna Condo
- Bernard Picasso
- Patrick Achdjian

== Reception ==
The film has a 33% rating on Rotten Tomatoes based on six reviews.

Ty Burr of Entertainment Weekly gave the film a positive review and wrote, "Along the way, though, Condo Painting turns unexpectedly affecting as we watch a canvas reworked (and reworked and reworked) over a two-year period. Whatever you may think about Condo’s kitsch-cartoon subject matter, this vision of creativity as blind, instinctive 'process' is exhilarating."

A. O. Scott of The New York Times gave the film a negative review and wrote, "You may wish that Mr. Condo would expand further on the space-time continuum, the status of conscious reality, the geography of the antipodes and other vital matters. On the other hand, you may wish that he would just shut up and paint and that Mr. McNaughton's restless camera would just sit still and watch him."

Kevin Thomas of the Los Angeles Times also gave the film a negative review and wrote, "John McNaughton’s documentary Condo Painting sounds like a put-on, and in a way it is, even though that title refers not to an apartment house getting a face lift but to a witty study of artist George Condo at work."
