= October Films =

Former independent film production company

October Films, Inc.
- Industry: Independent film
- Founded: 1991; 35 years ago
- Founder: Bingham Ray; Jeff Lipsky
- Defunct: April 7, 1999; 27 years ago
- Fate: Sold to USA Networks and merged with Gramercy Pictures and Interscope Communications to form USA Films
- Successor: Focus Features
- Headquarters: Beverly Hills, California, United States
- Parent: Universal Studios (1997–1999); USA Networks (1999)
- Subsidiaries: Rogue Pictures

October Films, Inc. was an American independent film production company and distributor founded in 1991 by Bingham Ray and Jeff Lipsky as a means of distributing the 1990 film Life Is Sweet in the United States.

A series of mergers and acquisitions began when Universal Studios (then a division of the Seagram Company) bought a majority stake in October Films in 1997. In 1999, Universal sold October, Interscope Communications, and Gramercy Pictures to Barry Diller, who merged the three companies to form USA Films. Vivendi then acquired USA Films, which acquired Good Machine in 2002 and merged it with USA Films and Universal Focus, forming Focus Features.

== Filmography ==
=== 1990s ===
Release date	Films	Notes
October 25, 1991	Life Is Sweet	
May 8, 1992	Adam's Rib	
August 21, 1992	The Living End	
September 4, 1992	The Tune	
November 13, 1992	Tous les matins du monde (All the Mornings of the World)	
March 31, 1993	Two Mikes Don't Make a Wright	
June 4, 1993	Un coeur en hiver (A Heart in Winter)	
June 25, 1993	Chain of Desire	
September 3, 1993	Bad Behaviour	
October 8, 1993	Ruby in Paradise	
November 3, 1993	The War Room	
February 11, 1994	The Cement Garden	
March 30, 1994	Cronos	
May 6, 1994	Kika	
August 19, 1994	Killing Zoe	
October 26, 1994	The Last Seduction	
December 23, 1994	Colonel Chabert	
January 31, 1995	The Silence of the Hams	
May 5, 1995	Search and Destroy	
May 19, 1995	Moving the Mountain	
June 2, 1995	Red Firecracker, Green Firecracker	
September 1, 1995	Nadja	
October 6, 1995	The Addiction	
November 10, 1995	The Kingdom	
November 17, 1995	When Night Is Falling	
December 7, 1995	Man with a Gun	
January 24, 1996	The White Balloon	
April 26, 1996	Cemetery Man	
May 2, 1996	Celestial Clockwork	
May 10, 1996	Someone Else's America	
June 18, 1996	Haunted	
August 14, 1996	Small Faces	
August 21, 1996	Girls Town	
September 27, 1996	Secrets & Lies	
October 22, 1996	Hollow Point	
November 1, 1996	The Funeral	
November 13, 1996	Breaking the Waves	
January 10, 1997	Natural Enemy	
February 21, 1997	Lost Highway	
April 18, 1997	Traveller	
April 25, 1997	Female Perversions	
August 8, 1997	Career Girls	
September 26, 1997	Kicked in the Head	
October 8, 1997	Year of the Horse	
November 14, 1997	Kiss or Kill	
December 12, 1997	The Peacekeeper	
February 20, 1998	The Apostle	
May 1, 1998	Still Breathing	
May 1, 1998	TwentyFourSeven	
May 6, 1998	The Kingdom II	
June 12, 1998	High Art	
August 7, 1998	Safe Men	
August 21, 1998	The Best Man	
August 1998	The Naked Man	
September 11, 1998	Touch of Evil	40th anniversary re-release
September 18, 1998	A Soldier's Daughter Never Cries	
October 9, 1998	The Celebration	
October 23, 1998	The Last Days	
November 8, 1998	The Death Train	
December 30, 1998	Hilary and Jackie	
January 28, 1999	Thick as Thieves	
April 2, 1999	Cookie's Fortune	
April 30, 1999	Three Seasons	
May 12, 1999	Trippin'	
June 18, 1999	The Phantom of the Opera	
July 9, 1999	Autumn Tale	
August 27, 1999	The Muse	
September 10, 1999	Black Cat, White Cat	distributed by USA Films
September 17, 1999	Sugar Town	distributed by USA Films
September 24, 1999	Lucie Aubrac	distributed by USA Films
October 5, 1999	Detour	distributed by USA Home Entertainment
November 5, 1999	Rosetta	distributed by USA Films
December 15, 1999	Topsy-Turvy	distributed by USA Films

=== 2000s ===
Release date	Title	Notes
March 3, 2000	Agnes Browne	distributed by USA Films
March 10, 2000	Condo Painting	distributed by USA Films
April 28, 2000	The Idiots	distributed by USA Films
May 5, 2000	Up at the Villa	distributed by USA Films
May 26, 2000	Joe Gould's Secret	distributed by USA Films
June 21, 2000	Boricua's Bond	copyright holder; distributed by USA Films
August 30, 2000	Alice and Martin	distributed by USA Films
October 20, 2000	A Room for Romeo Brass	distributed by USA Films
October 20, 2000	Cherry Falls	copyright holder; distributed by USA Films
March 2, 2001	Series 7: The Contenders	copyright holder; distributed by USA Films
April 27, 2001	One Night at McCool's	distributed by USA Films
June 8, 2001	Whatever Happened to Harold Smith?	distributed by USA Films
August 10, 2001	Session 9	copyright holder; distributed by USA Films
