= List of New Line Cinema films =

This is a list of films and television series produced, co-produced and/or distributed by New Line Cinema.

- A ‡ signifies a direct-to-video release or streaming release exclusively through HBO Max.

== 1960s ==
Release date	Title	Notes
July 18, 1967	Late August at the Hotel Ozone	first film by New Line Cinema; North American distribution only
December 26, 1967	Magical Mystery Tour	U.S. distribution only (theatrically released in 1974)
July 27, 1968	The Virgin President	first original movie
April 22, 1969	Sympathy for the Devil	North American distribution only

== 1970s ==
Release date	Title	Notes
April 10, 1970	Multiple Maniacs	produced by Dreamland
March 11, 1971	Brandy in the Wilderness	
July 8, 1971	Mississippi Summer	
December 15, 1971	Even Dwarfs Started Small	U.S. distribution only; produced by Werner Herzog
March 17, 1972	Pink Flamingos	produced by Dreamland
March 30, 1973	Reefer Madness	U.S. theatrical re-release
March 30, 1973	The Cocaine Fiends	U.S. theatrical re-release
June 18, 1974	The Seduction of Mimi	
October 1, 1974	The Texas Chain Saw Massacre	American theatrical re-release
October 4, 1974	Female Trouble	produced by Dreamland and Saliva Films
November 6, 1974	The Nada Gang	U.S. distribution only; produced by Italian International Film, Les Films de la Boétie and Verona Produzione
November 30, 1974	The Street Fighter	U.S. distribution only; produced by Toei Company
January 1975	A Page of Madness	U.S. distribution only
May 30, 1975	Nuits Rouges	U.S. distribution only
December 3, 1975	Return of the Street Fighter	U.S. distribution only; produced by Toei Company
January 14, 1976	All Screwed Up	
February 19, 1976	Sister Street Fighter	U.S. distribution only; produced by Toei Company
March 10, 1976	Immoral Tales	U.S. theatrical distribution only; subtitled version
June 18, 1976	The Cars That Ate Paris	U.S. distribution only; produced by The Australian Film Development Corporation and Royce Smeal Film Productions; re-edited and retitled The Cars That Eat People
January 12, 1977	Tattooed Hit Man	U.S. distribution only; produced by Toei Company
May 27, 1977	Desperate Living	
June 23, 1977	Conversation Piece	
August 17, 1977	Stunts	U.S. distribution only; produced by Mark Fleischman Ltd. and Spiegel-Bergman Productions Inc.
September 23, 1977	Calmos	U.S. distribution only; subtitled version; retitled Femmes Fatales
September 1977	Léonor	
February 25, 1978	Night of the Living Dead	re-release; public domain film
April 15, 1978	The Scenic Route	
June 7, 1978	Servant and Mistress	
December 17, 1978	Get Out Your Handkerchiefs (Note: Owned by Cohen Media Group)	U.S. distribution only; subtitled version
January 18, 1979	The Street Fighter's Last Revenge	U.S. distribution only; produced by Toei Company
October 24, 1979	Wise Blood	
December 21, 1979	Stay as You Are	U.S. distribution only; subtitled version

== 1980s ==
Release date	Title	Notes
January 21, 1980	Hurray for Betty Boop	distribution only
May 20, 1980	Underground U.S.A.	
May 25, 1981	Polyester	
October 11, 1981	Beau Pere	U.S. distribution only
October 15, 1981	The Evil Dead (Note: Owned by Renaissance Pictures, with distribution rights currently licensed to Sony Pictures)	distribution only
March 30, 1982	Bronson Lee, Champion	U.S. distribution only; produced by Toei Company
May 1, 1982	Beach House	
May 1, 1982	Roaring Fire	
November 3, 1982	Alone in the Dark	
November 15, 1982	Smithereens (Note: Owned by its director Susan Seidelman and Shout! Studios)	distribution only
January 3, 1983	Xtro	U.S. distribution only
June 13, 1983	Heatwave	U.S. distribution only
July 13, 1983	The First Time	
September 5, 1983	Escape from the Bronx (Note: US distribution rights currently owned by Blue Underground)	U.S. distribution only
January 16, 1984	Betrayal	U.S. distribution only
January 19, 1984	Copkiller	U.S. distribution only; co-production with RAI and Auro Films
January 29, 1984	Warriors of the Wasteland	U.S. distribution only
February 1, 1984	Dear Maestro	U.S. distribution only
February 15, 1984	Ator 2 - L'invincibile Orion	aka Cave Dwellers; U.S. distribution only
February 28, 1984	Running Hot	distribution only
April 30, 1984	Big Meat Eater	
May 2, 1984	Ferestadeh	
June 19, 1984	Blind Date	distribution only
August 15, 1984	Half a Life	U.S. distribution only
September 30, 1984	The Ninja Mission	U.S. distribution only
November 12, 1984	A Nightmare on Elm Street	First film in the post-November 1984 library owned by Warner Bros. Inducted into the National Film Registry in 2021
November 12, 1984	Special Effects (Note: Owned by MGM (via Orion Pictures))	distribution only; produced by Hemdale Film Corporation
November 21, 1984	Perfect Strangers	distribution only; produced by Hemdale Film Corporation
January 14, 1985	Crime Killer	
January 31, 1985	Exterminators in the Year 3000	
April 9, 1985	Lily in Love	American distribution only
April 15, 1985	Self Defense	distributor; produced by Salter Street Films
May 20, 1985	Return to Waterloo	U.S. distribution only; produced by Channel 4
August 5, 1985	Phenomena	U.S. distribution only
September 25, 1985	The Death of Mario Ricci	U.S. distribution only
September 1985	Buddies	distribution
November 6, 1985	A Nightmare on Elm Street 2: Freddy's Revenge	
April 7, 1986	Critters	
April 1986	The Ladies Club	U.S. distribution only
July 14, 1986	Sincerely Charlotte	U.S. distribution only
September 24, 1986	L'Effrontee (Note: Owned by TF1 Studio)	U.S. distribution only
November 12, 1986	Quiet Cool	
February 25, 1987	A Nightmare on Elm Street 3: Dream Warriors	first American national opening
April 20, 1987	My Demon Lover	
June 10, 1987	Summer Night, with Greek Profile, Almond Eyes and Scent of Basil	
August 26, 1987	The Rosary Murders	U.S. distribution only
October 28, 1987	The Hidden	co-production with Heron Communications and Mega Entertainment
November 25, 1987	Stranded	
February 24, 1988	Hairspray	Inducted into the National Film Registry in 2022
April 18, 1988	Eat the Rich	co-production with Channel 4 Films and Michael White
April 27, 1988	Critters 2: The Main Course	
May 4, 1988	Judgment in Berlin	distribution
June 13, 1988	The Decline of Western Civilization Part II: The Metal Years (Note: Owned by its director Penelope Spheeris under Spheeris Films Inc., with U.S. distribution rights currently licensed to Shout! Studios)	distribution only; produced by CineTel Films
June 22, 1988	A Handful of Dust (Note: Owned by ITV Studios, with North American distribution rights licensed to Shout! Studios)	American distribution only; produced by London Weekend Television
August 15, 1988	A Nightmare on Elm Street 4: The Dream Master	
September 14, 1988	The Prince of Pennsylvania	
September 14, 1988	Tougher Than Leather	
November 14, 1988	Lucky Stiff	
December 14, 1988	Torch Song Trilogy	
March 1, 1989	Hit List	distribution only; produced by CineTel Films, first CineTel Films film
March 22, 1989	976-EVIL	distribution; produced by CineTel Films
May 3, 1989	Out of the Dark	distribution only; produced by CineTel Films
June 7, 1989	No Holds Barred (Note: Owned by WWE Studios, with U.S. distribution rights licensed to Vertical)	
June 26, 1989	A Sinful Life	
July 26, 1989	Babar: The Movie	U.S. distribution only; produced by Nelvana, Ellipse and The Clifford Ross Company
August 7, 1989	A Nightmare on Elm Street 5: The Dream Child	
August 30, 1989	Relentless	distribution only; produced by CineTel Films
November 6, 1989	Communion	

== 1990s ==
Release date	Title	Notes	Distributor(s)
January 12, 1990	Leatherface: The Texas Chainsaw Massacre III		
February 2, 1990	Heart Condition		New Line Cinema (United States); Alliance Releasing (Canada); Enterprise Pictures (United Kingdom); Metropolitan Filmexport (France); Cannon Film Distributors (Netherlands)
February 23, 1990	The Blood of Heroes (Note: Owned by Lionsgate)	U.S. distribution only, produced by Kings Road Entertainment	
March 9, 1990	House Party		New Line Cinema (United States); Alliance Releasing (Canada); Enterprise Pictures (United Kingdom)
March 30, 1990	Teenage Mutant Ninja Turtles	North American distribution only; produced by Mirage Studios and Golden Harvest	New Line Cinema (United States); Alliance Releasing (Canada)
May 11, 1990	Far Out Man (Note: Owned by FilmRise)	U.S. distribution only; produced by CineTel Films	
July 20, 1990	Chicago Joe and the Showgirl (Note: Owned by Universal Pictures (via Focus Features))	U.S. distribution only; produced by PolyGram Filmed Entertainment and Working Title Films	
August 3, 1990	Metropolitan (Note: Owned by Waverly Films, with U.S. theatrical distribution rights owned by Rialto Pictures)		New Line Cinema (United States); Alliance Releasing (Canada); Mainline Pictures (United Kingdom)
August 24, 1990	Pump Up the Volume		New Line Cinema (United States); Alliance Releasing (Canada); Entertainment Film Distributors (United Kingdom); BAC Films (France); Three Lines Pictures (Netherlands)
September 7, 1990	Masters of Menace	distribution; produced by CineTel Films	
September 14, 1990	Fools of Fortune (Note: Owned by Universal Pictures)	U.S. distribution only; produced by PolyGram Filmed Entertainment and Channel Four Films	
September 14, 1990	Repossessed (Note: Owned by StudioCanal, with U.S. distribution rights owned by Lionsgate)	North American distribution under Seven Arts only; produced by Carolco Pictures; first film produced by Seven Arts, a joint venture between New Line and Carolco Pictures	
September 28, 1990	King of New York	North American distribution with Carolco Pictures under Seven Arts only	
October 12, 1990	Alligator II: The Mutation	distribution only; produced by Golden Hawk Entertainment	
October 19, 1990	Book of Love		New Line Cinema (United States); Alliance Releasing (Canada); Entertainment Film Distributors (United Kingdom)
November 2, 1990	The Man Inside		
January 16, 1991	Cadence (Note: Owned by Paramount Pictures (via Melange Pictures))	distribution only; produced by Republic Pictures	
January 21, 1991	Too Much Sun	distribution only; produced by CineTel Films	
February 8, 1991	Queens Logic	distribution with Carolco Pictures under Seven Arts only; produced by New Visions Pictures	
March 8, 1991	Shadow of China	with Fine Line Features	
March 18, 1991	The Guyver (Note: Owned by Samuel Goldwyn Films)	U.S. distribution only	
March 22, 1991	Teenage Mutant Ninja Turtles II: The Secret of the Ooze	North American distribution only; produced by Golden Harvest and Mirage Studios	New Line Cinema (United States); Alliance Releasing (Canada)
April 5, 1991	Hangin' with the Homeboys		New Line Cinema (United States); Alliance Releasing (Canada); Palace Pictures (United Kingdom)
May 17, 1991	Dice Rules	U.S. distribution only; produced and released under Seven Arts/Carolco Pictures	
May 24, 1991	Drop Dead Fred	U.S. distribution only; produced by PolyGram Filmed Entertainment and Working Title Films	
August 16, 1991	Talkin' Dirty After Dark		
August 23, 1991	Defenseless	distribution with Carolco Pictures under Seven Arts only; produced by New Visions Pictures	
August 23, 1991	Naked Tango	U.S. distribution only	
August 28, 1991	Beastmaster 2: Through the Portal of Time	theatrical distribution only	New Line Cinema (United States); Alliance Releasing (Canada); Medusa Communications (United Kingdom)
September 13, 1991	Freddy's Dead: The Final Nightmare		New Line Cinema (United States); Alliance Releasing (Canada); Guild Film Distribution (United Kingdom); Metropolitan Filmexport (France); CNR Film (Netherlands)
September 27, 1991	Rambling Rose	North American distribution under Seven Arts only; produced by Carolco Pictures	
September 27, 1991	Late for Dinner (Note: Owned by New Line parent Warner Bros., with certain distribution rights currently owned by MGM (via Orion Pictures))	co-production with Castle Rock Entertainment	Columbia Pictures (United States and Canada); First Independent Films (United Kingdom); Concorde Entertainment Group (Benelux)
October 4, 1991	Heaven Is a Playground		
October 4, 1991	Suburban Commando		New Line Cinema (United States); Alliance Releasing (Canada); Entertainment Film Distributors (United Kingdom)
October 21, 1991	Past Midnight (Note: Owned by Sony Pictures)	distribution only; produced by CineTel Films	
October 25, 1991	House Party 2		New Line Cinema (United States); Alliance Releasing (Canada); First Independent Films (United Kingdom)
November 1, 1991	Get Back	distribution with Carolco Pictures under Seven Arts only	
November 27, 1991	The Dark Wind	North American distribution only; produced by Le Studio Canal+ and Seven Arts	
March 6, 1992	The Lawnmower Man (Note: Owned by Shout! Studios)	North American distribution only; produced by Allied Vision, Fuji Eight Company Ltd., Angel Studios and Lane Pringle Productions.	New Line Cinema (United States); Alliance Releasing (Canada)
April 17, 1992	Deep Cover		New Line Cinema (United States); Alliance Releasing (Canada); First Independent Films (United Kingdom)
April 24, 1992	Year of the Comet	co-production with Columbia Pictures and Castle Rock Entertainment	
April 29, 1992	Big Girls Don't Cry... They Get Even		
May 8, 1992	Poison Ivy		
June 8, 1992	Aces: Iron Eagle III	North American distribution only; produced by Seven Arts	
August 14, 1992	Light Sleeper	under Seven Arts; produced by Carolco Pictures; distributed by Fine Line Features; last film produced by New Line/Carolco's joint venture, Seven Arts	
August 28, 1992	Honeymoon in Vegas	co-production with Castle Rock Entertainment	Columbia Pictures (United States and Canada); First Independent Films (United Kingdom); Egmont Film (Scandivania); Concorde Entertainment Group (Benelux)
August 28, 1992	Twin Peaks: Fire Walk with Me (Note: Distribution rights owned by Paramount Pictures (via CBS) and mk2 Films, with U.S. distribution rights sub-licensed to Janus Films and The Criterion Collection)	North American distribution only	New Line Cinema (United States); Alliance Releasing (Canada)
September 2, 1992	Live Wire		New Line Cinema (United States); Alliance Releasing (Canada); United International Pictures (Germany); Intersonic (Czech Republic); Oscar Vison Film Distribution (Croatia)
September 7, 1992	Where the Day Takes You	distribution; produced by CineTel Films	
September 25, 1992	Mr. Saturday Night	co-production with Castle Rock Entertainment	Columbia Pictures (United States and Canada); First Independent Films (United Kingdom)
October 9, 1992	Glengarry Glen Ross (Note: Owned by Shout! Studios (via Westchester Films))	theatrical distribution only	New Line Cinema (United States); Rank Film Distributors (United Kingdom); Columbia TriStar Films (Scandivania); CNR Film (Netherlands)
October 9, 1992	Johnny Stecchino	U.S. distribution only	
December 23, 1992	Damage	North American distribution only; produced by Le Studio Canal+ and Channel Four Films	New Line Cinema (United States); Alliance Releasing (Canada)
February 5, 1993	Loaded Weapon 1	known as National Lampoon's Loaded Weapon 1	New Line Cinema (United States); Alliance Releasing (Canada); Guild Film Distribution (United Kingdom and Czech Republic); Metropolitan Filmexport (France); Meteor Film (Netherlands); Independent Films Distribution (Belgium)
March 3, 1993	Sunset Grill	co-production with The Movie Group and Cinema Studio	
March 5, 1993	Amos & Andrew	co-production with Castle Rock Entertainment	Columbia Pictures (United States and Canada); Rank Film Distributors (United Kingdom); Concorde Entertainment Group (Benelux)
March 19, 1993	Teenage Mutant Ninja Turtles III	North American distribution only; co-production with Mirage Studios	New Line Cinema (United States); Alliance Releasing (Canada)
April 23, 1993	Who's the Man?	co-production with de Passe Entertainment	New Line Cinema (United States); Alliance Releasing (Canada); Metro Tartan Pictures (United Kingdom)
April 30, 1993	Three of Hearts		New Line Cinema (United States); Alliance Releasing (Canada); Guild Film Distribution (United Kingdom)
May 14, 1993	Excessive Force		New Line Cinema (United States); Alliance Releasing (Canada); Meteor Film (Netherlands); Independent Films Distribution (Belgium)
May 28, 1993	Menace II Society		New Line Cinema (United States); Alliance Releasing (Canada); 20th Century Fox (Germany and Austria); First Independent Films (United Kingdom); Sandrew Film (Scandivania); Meteor Film (Netherlands); Independent Films Distribution (Belgium)
August 6, 1993	Jason Goes to Hell: The Final Friday		New Line Cinema (United States); Alliance Releasing (Canada); Guild Film Distribution (United Kingdom); Metropolitan Filmexport (France)
August 20, 1993	Surf Ninjas		New Line Cinema (United States); Alliance Releasing (Canada); Entertainment Film Distributors (United Kingdom)
August 27, 1993	Needful Things	co-production with Castle Rock Entertainment	Columbia Pictures (United States, Canada and Japan); Rank Film Distributors (United Kingdom); United International Pictures (Germany); Concorde Entertainment Group (Benelux)
October 1, 1993	Malice	co-production with Castle Rock Entertainment	Columbia Pictures (United States and Canada); Rank Film Distributors (United Kingdom); United International Pictures (Germany); Concorde Entertainment Group (Benelux)
October 8, 1993	Gettysburg	North American theatrical distribution only; produced by Turner Pictures	
October 8, 1993	Mr. Nanny		New Line Cinema (United States); Entertainment Film Distributors (United Kingdom)
November 12, 1993	Man's Best Friend		New Line Cinema (United States); Alliance Releasing (Canada); Guild Film Distribution (United Kingdom)
November 24, 1993	Josh and S.A.M.	co-production with Castle Rock Entertainment	Columbia Pictures (United States and Canada); Rank Film Distributors (U.K. and Ireland); Concorde Entertainment Group (Benelux)
January 14, 1994	House Party 3		
January 26, 1994	Blink		New Line Cinema (United States); Alliance Releasing (Canada); Guild Film Distribution (United Kingdom); Sandrew Film (Scandivania)
February 25, 1994	8 Seconds		New Line Cinema (United States); Alliance Releasing (Canada); First Independent Films (United Kingdom)
March 4, 1994	Monkey Trouble		New Line Cinema (United States); Alliance Releasing (Canada); Entertainment Film Distributors (United Kingdom); Sandrew Film (Scandivania)
March 25, 1994	Above the Rim		New Line Cinema (United States); Alliance Releasing (Canada); First Independent Films (United Kingdom)
April 15, 1994	Surviving the Game		
June 3, 1994	The Endless Summer II (Note: Owned by its director Bruce Brown under Bruce Brown Films)		
July 11, 1994	The Hidden II		
July 22, 1994	North	co-production with Columbia Pictures and Castle Rock Entertainment	Columbia Pictures (North and Latin America, Germany and Austria); Rank Film Distributors (United Kingdom)
July 29, 1994	The Mask	co-production with Dark Horse Entertainment	New Line Cinema (United States); Alliance Releasing (Canada); Connexion Film (Germany); Entertainment Film Distributors (United Kingdom); Sandrew Film (Scandivania); PolyGram Filmed Entertainment Distribution (Benelux)
August 12, 1994	Corrina, Corrina		New Line Cinema (United States); Alliance Releasing (Canada); Guild Film Distribution (United Kingdom); Metropolitan Filmexport (France); Sandrew Film (Scandivania); PolyGram Filmed Entertainment Distribution (Benelux)
October 14, 1994	Wes Craven's New Nightmare		New Line Cinema (United States); Alliance Releasing (Canada); Guild Film Distribution (United Kingdom); Metropolitan Filmexport (France); Sandrew Film (Scandivania); PolyGram Filmed Entertainment Distribution (Benelux)
November 18, 1994	The Swan Princess	North American theatrical distribution only, produced by Nest Entertainment and Rich Animation Studios	New Line Cinema (United States); Alliance Releasing (Canada)
December 16, 1994	Dumb and Dumber	co-production with Motion Picture Corporation of America	New Line Cinema (United States); Alliance Releasing (Canada); First Independent Films (United Kingdom); Sandrew Film (Scandivania); RCV Film Distribution (Netherlands); Independent Films Distribution (Belgium)
December 23, 1994	Safe Passage		New Line Cinema (United States); Alliance Releasing (Canada); Entertainment Film Distributors (United Kingdom)
February 3, 1995	In the Mouth of Madness		New Line Cinema (United States); Alliance Releasing (Canada); Entertainment Film Distributors (United Kingdom); Metropolitan Filmexport (France)
March 3, 1995	The Mangler	co-production with Distant Horizon	New Line Cinema (United States); Alliance Releasing (Canada); Guild Film Distribution (United Kingdom)
April 7, 1995	Don Juan DeMarco	co-production with American Zoetrope	New Line Cinema (United States); Alliance Releasing (Canada); Entertainment Film Distributors (United Kingdom); PolyGram Filmed Entertainment Distribution (Benelux); Warner Bros. Pictures (Finland and Slovenia); UCD Distribucija (Croatia)
April 21, 1995	The Basketball Diaries	co-production with Island Pictures	New Line Cinema (United States); Alliance Releasing (Canada); First Independent Films (United Kingdom); Roadshow Entertainment (Australia); Svensk Filmindustri (Scandivania)
April 26, 1995	Friday		New Line Cinema (United States); Alliance Releasing (Canada); Entertainment Film Distributors (United Kingdom)
May 5, 1995	My Family	co-production with American Zoetrope; Inducted into the National Film Registry in 2024	New Line Cinema (United States); Alliance Releasing (Canada); Entertainment Film Distributors (United Kingdom)
May 30, 1995	Embrace of the Vampire		
August 18, 1995	Mortal Kombat	co-production with Threshold Entertainment	New Line Cinema (United States); Alliance Releasing (Canada); Entertainment Film Distributors (United Kingdom); Metropolitan Filmexport (France); PolyGram Filmed Entertainment Distribution (Benelux); Intersonic (Czech Republic); Sandrew Film (Scandivania)
September 1, 1995	National Lampoon's Senior Trip		
September 15, 1995	Angus	North American theatrical distribution only; produced by BBC and Turner Pictures	New Line Cinema (United States); Alliance Releasing (Canada)
September 22, 1995	Seven		New Line Cinema (United States); Alliance Releasing (Canada); Constantin Film (Germany); Entertainment Film Distributors (United Kingdom); Sandrew Film (Scandivania); PolyGram Filmed Entertainment Distribution (Benelux); Warner Bros. Pictures (India)
October 13, 1995	Now and Then	co-production with Moving Pictures	New Line Cinema (United States); Alliance Releasing (Canada); First Independent Films (United Kingdom)
October 24, 1995	Howling: New Moon Rising		
January 12, 1996	Lawnmower Man 2: Beyond Cyberspace	North American distribution only	New Line Cinema (United States); Alliance Releasing (Canada)
January 26, 1996	Bed of Roses		New Line Cinema (United States); Alliance Releasing (Canada); Entertainment Film Distributors (United Kingdom); Intersonic (Czech Republic); Metropolitan Filmexport (France); Sandrew Film (Scandivania)
February 9, 1996	Pie in the Sky	with Fine Line Features	
February 16, 1996	Rumble in the Bronx	North American distribution only; produced by Golden Harvest	New Line Cinema (United States); Alliance Releasing (Canada)
April 3, 1996	A Thin Line Between Love and Hate	co-production with Savoy Pictures, Jackson-McHenry Entertainment and You Go Boy! Productions	
April 19, 1996	Faithful	U.S. distribution only; co-production with Savoy Pictures, TriBeCa Productions and Miramax Films	
May 17, 1996	Heaven's Prisoners	North American co-distribution with Savoy Pictures only	New Line Cinema (United States); Alliance Releasing (Canada)
July 26, 1996	The Adventures of Pinocchio (Note: Owned by Multicom Entertainment Group)	North American co-distribution with Savoy Pictures only; produced by The Kushner-Locke Company and Dieter Geissler Filmproduktion	New Line Cinema (United States); Alliance Releasing (Canada)
August 23, 1996	The Island of Dr. Moreau		New Line Cinema (United States); Alliance Releasing (Canada); Entertainment Film Distributors (United Kingdom); RCV Film Distribution (Netherlands); UCD Distribucija (Croatia)
August 30, 1996	The Stupids	co-production with Savoy Pictures and Rank Film Distributors	
September 13, 1996	Feeling Minnesota	with Fine Line Features and Jersey Films	
September 20, 1996	Last Man Standing		New Line Cinema (United States); Alliance Releasing (Canada); Entertainment Film Distributors (United Kingdom); Sandrew Film (Scandivania); RCV Film Distribution (Netherlands)
October 11, 1996	The Long Kiss Goodnight		New Line Cinema (United States); Alliance Releasing (Canada); Entertainment Film Distributors (United Kingdom); Sandrew Film (Scandivania); RCV Film Distribution (Netherlands)
October 25, 1996	Normal Life	with Fine Line Features	
October 27, 1996	Bullet (Note: Co-owned by Alcon Entertainment)	co-production with Village Roadshow Pictures	
October 29, 1996	Necronomicon	distribution only; produced by Davis Film	
November 8, 1996	Set It Off		New Line Cinema (United States); Alliance Releasing (Canada); Entertainment Film Distributors (United Kingdom); RCV Film Distribution (Netherlands)
December 20, 1996	In Love and War		New Line Cinema (United States); Alliance Releasing (Canada); Entertainment Film Distributors (United Kingdom); Sandrew Film (Scandivania); PolyGram Filmed Entertainment (Benelux)
December 25, 1996	Michael	North American theatrical distribution only; produced by Turner Pictures	New Line Cinema (United States); Alliance Releasing (Canada)
January 10, 1997	Jackie Chan's First Strike	North American distribution only; produced by Golden Harvest	New Line Cinema (United States); Alliance Releasing (Canada)
February 14, 1997	Dangerous Ground		New Line Cinema (United States); Alliance Releasing (Canada); Entertainment Film Distributors (United Kingdom)
March 14, 1997	Love Jones		New Line Cinema (United States); Alliance Releasing (Canada); Entertainment Film Distributors (United Kingdom)
March 28, 1997	B*A*P*S		New Line Cinema (United States); Alliance Releasing (Canada); Entertainment Film Distributors (United Kingdom)
May 2, 1997	Austin Powers: International Man of Mystery (Note: Distribution rights co-owned by Resurgence Media Group)	North American distribution only; co-production with Capella International, KC Medien and Moving Pictures	New Line Cinema (United States); Alliance Releasing (Canada)
May 30, 1997	Trial and Error		New Line Cinema (United States); Alliance Releasing (Canada); Entertainment Film Distributors (United Kingdom); Sandrew Film (Scandivania)
August 1, 1997	Spawn	co-production with Todd McFarlane Entertainment	New Line Cinema (United States); Alliance Releasing (Canada); Entertainment Film Distributors (United Kingdom); PolyGram Filmed Entertainment (Benelux)
August 22, 1997	Money Talks		New Line Cinema (United States); Alliance Releasing (Canada); Entertainment Film Distributors (United Kingdom); Metropolitan Filmexport (France); Sandrew Film (Scandivania); PolyGram Filmed Entertainment (Benelux); Intersonic (Czech Republic)
October 10, 1997	Boogie Nights		New Line Cinema (United States); Alliance Releasing (Canada); Entertainment Film Distributors (United Kingdom); Sandrew Film (Scandivania); PolyGram Filmed Entertainment (Benelux)
October 10, 1997	Most Wanted		New Line Cinema (United States); Alliance Releasing (Canada); Entertainment Film Distributors (United Kingdom); Metropolitan Filmexport (France)
November 14, 1997	One Night Stand		New Line Cinema (United States); Alliance Releasing (Canada); Entertainment Film Distributors (United Kingdom); Sandrew Film (Scandivania); PolyGram Filmed Entertainment (Benelux)
November 21, 1997	Mortal Kombat Annihilation	co-production with Midway Games and Threshold Entertainment	New Line Cinema (United States); Alliance Releasing (Canada); Entertainment Film Distributors (United Kingdom); Metropolitan Filmexport (France); PolyGram Filmed Entertainment (Benelux); Warner Bros. Pictures (Brazil and India); Intersonic (Czech Republic); UCD Distribucija (Croatia)
December 25, 1997	Wag the Dog		New Line Cinema (United States); Alliance Releasing (Canada); Entertainment Film Distributors (United Kingdom); Metropolitan Filmexport (France); Sandrew Film (Scandivania); PolyGram Filmed Entertainment (Benelux); Warner Bros. Pictures (Brazil and India)
February 6, 1998	The Night Flier		
February 13, 1998	The Wedding Singer		New Line Cinema (United States); Alliance Releasing (Canada); Entertainment Film Distributors (United Kingdom); Metropolitan Filmexport (France); Sandrew Film (Scandivania); PolyGram Filmed Entertainment (Benelux); Warner Bros. Pictures (Brazil, India and Italy); Premiere Entertainment (Slovenia)
February 20, 1998	Dark City		New Line Cinema (United States); Alliance Releasing (Canada); Videocine (Mexico); Entertainment Film Distributors (United Kingdom); Metropolitan Filmexport (France); Warner Bros. Pictures (Brazil)
March 20, 1998	Mr. Nice Guy	distribution outside Asia only; co-production with Golden Harvest	New Line Cinema (United States); Alliance Releasing (Canada); Kinowelt Medien (Germany and Switzerland); Entertainment Film Distributors (United Kingdom); Metropolitan Filmexport (France); UCD Distribucija (Croatia)
April 3, 1998	Lost in Space	co-production with Saltire Entertainment, Irwin Allen Productions and Prelude Pictures	New Line Cinema (United States); Alliance Releasing (Canada); Entertainment Film Distributors (United Kingdom); Metropolitan Filmexport (France); Sandrew Film (Scandivania); RCV Film Distribution (Netherlands); Kinepolis Film Distribution (Belgium); Warner Bros. Pictures (Brazil and India); Intersonic (Czech Republic)
April 10, 1998	The Players Club		New Line Cinema (United States); Entertainment Film Distributors (United Kingdom)
May 8, 1998	Woo		New Line Cinema (United States); Alliance Releasing (Canada); Entertainment Film Distributors (United Kingdom)
August 21, 1998	Blade	co-production with Marvel Entertainment	New Line Cinema (United States); Alliance Releasing (Canada); Entertainment Film Distributors (United Kingdom); Metropolitan Filmexport (France); RCV Film Distribution (Netherlands); Kinepolis Film Distribution (Belgium); New Image Entertainment (India); Warner Bros. Pictures (Italy)
September 18, 1998	Rush Hour		New Line Cinema (United States); Alliance Releasing (Canada); Kinowelt Medien (Germany and Switzerland); Entertainment Film Distributors (United Kingdom); Metropolitan Filmexport (France); Sandrew Metronome (Scandivania); Paradiso Filmed Entertainment (Benelux); Warner Bros. Pictures (India and Italy)
October 23, 1998	Pleasantville		New Line Cinema (United States); Alliance Releasing (Canada); Entertainment Film Distributors (United Kingdom); Metropolitan Filmexport (France); Sandrew Metronome (Scandivania); RCV Film Distribution (Netherlands); Kinepolis Film Distribution (Belgium); Warner Bros. Pictures (Singapore)
October 30, 1998	Living Out Loud		New Line Cinema (United States); Alliance Releasing (Canada); Entertainment Film Distributors (United Kingdom)
October 30, 1998	American History X		New Line Cinema (United States); Alliance Releasing (Canada); Kinowelt Medien (Germany and Switzerland); Entertainment Film Distributors (United Kingdom); Roadshow Entertainment (Australia and Greece); Metropolitan Filmexport (France); Aurum Producciones (Spain); Videocine (Mexico); Sandrew Metronome (Scandivania); RCV Film Distribution (Netherlands); Kinepolis Film Distribution (Belgium); Warner Bros. Pictures (India); Nippon Herald Films (Japan); Daewoo Entertainment (Korea)
February 12, 1999	Blast from the Past	co-production with Midnight Sun Pictures	New Line Cinema (United States); Alliance Atlantis (Canada); Entertainment Film Distributors (United Kingdom); Metropolitan Filmexport (France); Aurum Producciones (Spain); Medusa Distribuzione (Italy); Sandrew Metronome (Scandinavia); RCV Film Distribution (Netherlands); Kinepolis Film Distribution (Belgium); Vision Film Distribution Company (Poland); Videocine (Mexico); Warner Bros. Pictures (Brazil, Czechoslovakia and India); Nippon Herald Films (Japan); Daewoo Entertainment (Korea)
March 12, 1999	The Corruptor	co-production with Illusion Entertainment Group	New Line Cinema (United States); Alliance Atlantis (Canada); Entertainment Film Distributors (United Kingdom); Metropolitan Filmexport (France); Aurum Producciones (Spain); Medusa Distribuzione (Italy); Sandrew Metronome (Scandinavia); RCV Film Distribution (Netherlands); Kinepolis Film Distribution (Belgium); Vision Film Distribution Company (Poland); Videocine (Mexico); Warner Bros. Pictures (Brazil, Czechoslovakia and India); Nippon Herald Films (Japan); Daewoo Entertainment (Korea)
June 11, 1999	Austin Powers: The Spy Who Shagged Me	co-production with Eric's Boy, Moving Pictures and Team Todd	New Line Cinema (United States); Alliance Atlantis (Canada); Entertainment Film Distributors (United Kingdom); Metropolitan Filmexport (France); Aurum Producciones (Spain); Medusa Distribuzione (Italy); Sandrew Metronome (Scandinavia); RCV Film Distribution (Netherlands); Kinepolis Film Distribution (Belgium); Vision Film Distribution Company (Poland); Videocine (Mexico); Warner Bros. Pictures (Brazil, Czechoslovakia and India); Nippon Herald Films (Japan); Daewoo Entertainment (Korea)
July 23, 1999	Drop Dead Gorgeous	North American distribution only; co-production with Capella International and KC Medien	New Line Cinema (United States); Alliance Atlantis (Canada)
August 13, 1999	Detroit Rock City	co-production with Takoma Entertainment Group, Base-12 Productions and KISS Nation	New Line Cinema (United States); Alliance Atlantis (Canada)
August 27, 1999	The Astronaut's Wife		New Line Cinema (United States); Alliance Atlantis (Canada); Kinowelt Medien (Germany and Switzerland); Entertainment Film Distributors (United Kingdom); Roadshow Entertainment (Australia and Greece); RCV Film Distribution (Netherlands); Kinepolis Film Distribution (Belgium); Medusa Distribuzione (Italy); Aurum Producciones (Spain); Sandrew Metronome (Scandinavia); Warner Bros. Pictures (India); GAGA-Humax (Japan); Taewon International (Korea)
September 10, 1999	Dog Park	U.S. distribution only; co-production with Lions Gate Films	
October 22, 1999	Body Shots		New Line Cinema (United States); Alliance Atlantis (Canada); Kinowelt Medien (Germany and Switzerland); Videocine (Mexico); Aurum Producciones (Spain); Entertainment Film Distributors (United Kingdom); Roadshow Entertainment (Australia and Greece); Metropolitan Filmexport (France); Medusa Distribuzione (Italy); RCV Film Distribution (Netherlands); Nippon Herald Films (Japan)
November 5, 1999	The Bachelor	co-production with George Street Pictures	New Line Cinema (United States); Alliance Atlantis (Canada); Aurum Producciones (Spain); Entertainment Film Distributors (United Kingdom); Roadshow Entertainment (Australia and Greece); Metropolitan Filmexport (France); Medusa Distribuzione (Italy); Svensk Filmindustri (Scandinavia); RCV Film Distribution (Netherlands); Kinepolis Film Distribution (Belgium); Warner Bros. Pictures (India); GAGA-Humax (Japan); Taewon International (Korea); Mongkol Major (Thailand)
December 17, 1999	Magnolia		New Line Cinema (United States); Alliance Atlantis (Canada); PlayArte Pictures (Brazil); Kinowelt Medien (Germany and Switzerland); Entertainment Film Distributors (United Kingdom); Roadshow Entertainment (Australia and Greece); Videocine (Mexico); Metropolitan Filmexport (France); Aurum Producciones (Spain); Svensk Filmindustri (Scandinavia); Myndform (Japan); A-Film Distribution (Netherlands); Cinéart (Belgium); Pris Audiovisuais (Portugal); Nu Metro (South Africa); Warner Bros. Pictures (Czechoslovakia, India, Singapore and Hispanic America excluding Mexico); Nippon Herald Films (Japan); Taewon International (Korea); CMC Magnetics Corporation (Taiwan); Mongkol Major (Thailand); Golden Screen Cinemas (Malaysia); Road Show (Middle East)

== 2000s ==
Release date	Title	Notes	Distributor(s)
January 12, 2000	Next Friday	co-production with Cube Vision	New Line Cinema (United States); Alliance Atlantis (Canada); Entertainment Film Distributors (United Kingdom and Ireland); Roadshow Entertainment (Australia, New Zealand, Greece and Cyprus); Aurum Producciones (Spain); Svensk Filmindustri (Scandinavia); Metropolitan Filmexport (France); Kinowelt Filmverleih (Germany, Austria, Switzerland and Eastern Europe)
February 18, 2000	Boiler Room		New Line Cinema (United States); Alliance Atlantis (Canada); Aurum Producciones (Spain); Entertainment Film Distributors (United Kingdom); Roadshow Entertainment (Australia and Greece); Metropolitan Filmexport (France); Nexo Pictures (Italy)
March 17, 2000	Final Destination		New Line Cinema (United States); Alliance Atlantis (Canada); Kinowelt Filmverleih (Germany, Austria, Switzerland and Eastern Europe); Aurum Producciones (Spain); Entertainment Film Distributors (United Kingdom); Roadshow Entertainment (Australia and Greece); Metropolitan Filmexport (France); Nexo Pictures (Italy); RCV Entertainment (Netherlands); Kinepolis Film Distribution (Belgium); GAGA-Humax (Japan); Warner Bros. Pictures (India); Svensk Filmindustri (Scandinavia); PlayArte Pictures (Brazil); Taewon Entertainment (Korea); Mongkol Major (Thailand); Edko Films (Hong Kong)
March 31, 2000	Price of Glory		New Line Cinema (United States); Alliance Atlantis (Canada); Aurum Producciones (Spain); Entertainment Film Distributors (United Kingdom)
April 21, 2000	Love & Basketball	Inducted into the National Film Registry in 2023	New Line Cinema (United States); Alliance Atlantis (Canada); Entertainment Film Distributors (United Kingdom)
April 28, 2000	Frequency		New Line Cinema (United States); Alliance Atlantis (Canada); Entertainment Film Distributors (United Kingdom); Metropolitan Filmexport (France); Nexo Pictures (Italy); Svensk Filmindustri (Scandivania); RCV Entertainment (Netherlands); GAGA Communications (Japan)
August 18, 2000	The Cell		New Line Cinema (United States); Entertainment Film Distributors (United Kingdom); Roadshow Entertainment (Australia and Greece); Metropolitan Filmexport (France); Nexo Pictures (Italy); Svensk Filmindustri (Scandivania); RCV Entertainment (Netherlands); Kinepolis Film Distribution (Belgium); GAGA Communications (Japan); New Image Entertainment (India)
September 6, 2000	Turn It Up		New Line Cinema (United States)
October 6, 2000	Bamboozled	co-production with 40 Acres and a Mule Filmworks; Inducted into the National Film Registry in 2023	New Line Cinema (United States); Alliance Atlantis (Canada); Aurum Producciones (Spain); Entertainment Film Distributors (United Kingdom); Metropolitan Filmexport (France); Paradiso Filmed Entertainment (Benelux)
October 13, 2000	Lost Souls		New Line Cinema (United States); Alliance Atlantis (Canada); Entertainment Film Distributors (United Kingdom); Metropolitan Filmexport (France); Nexo Pictures (Italy); RCV Entertainment (Netherlands); Kinepolis Film Distribution (Belgium)
October 27, 2000	The Little Vampire	distribution outside the U.K., Ireland, Germany, Austria and Switzerland only; produced by Cometstone Pictures and Stonewood Communications	New Line Cinema (United States); Alliance Atlantis (Canada); Nexo Pictures (Italy); Independent Films (Netherlands); New Image Entertainment (India)
November 10, 2000	Little Nicky	co-production with Happy Madison Productions	New Line Cinema (United States); Alliance Atlantis (Canada); Metropolitan Filmexport (France); Entertainment Film Distributors (United Kingdom); Svensk Filmindustri (Scandivania); Kinepolis Film Distribution (Belgium); Celebrity Films (India)
December 8, 2000	Dungeons & Dragons	North American distribution only; produced by Silver Pictures, Stillking and MDP Worldwide	New Line Cinema (United States); Alliance Atlantis (Canada)
December 25, 2000	Thirteen Days	North American and select international distribution only; produced by Beacon Pictures and Tig Productions	
January 26, 2001	Sugar & Spice		New Line Cinema (United States); Alliance Atlantis (Canada); Entertainment Film Distributors (United Kingdom)
March 9, 2001	15 Minutes	co-production with Tribeca Productions	New Line Cinema (United States); Alliance Atlantis (Canada); Entertainment Film Distributors (United Kingdom); Metropolitan Filmexport (France); Nexo Pictures (Italy); Svensk Filmindustri (Scandivania); RCV Entertainment (Netherlands); Kinepolis Film Distribution (Belgium)
April 6, 2001	Blow		New Line Cinema (United States); Alliance Atlantis (Canada); Aurum Producciones (Spain); Entertainment Film Distributors (United Kingdom); Metropolitan Filmexport (France); Nexo Pictures (Italy); Svensk Filmindustri (Scandivania); Paradiso Filmed Entertainment (Benelux)
May 18, 2001	Town & Country		New Line Cinema (United States); Alliance Atlantis (Canada); Entertainment Film Distributors (United Kingdom); Aurum Producciones (Spain); Metropolitan Filmexport (France); Nexo Pictures (Italy)
July 27, 2001	Rush Hour 2		New Line Cinema (United States); Alliance Atlantis (Canada); Warner Bros. Pictures (Germany, Switzerland, Eastern Europe and Russia); Aurum Producciones (Spain); Entertainment Film Distributors (United Kingdom); Roadshow Entertainment (Australia and Greece); Metropolitan Filmexport (France); Paradiso Filmed Entertainment (Benelux); Celebrity Films (India); Cineworld Entertainment (Korea)
August 24, 2001	Bones		New Line Cinema (United States); Alliance Atlantis (Canada); Metropolitan Filmexport (France); GAGA Communications (Japan); New Image Entertainment (India)
September 14, 2001	Life as a House		New Line Cinema (United States); Alliance Atlantis (Canada); Warner Bros. Pictures (Germany, Switzerland, Eastern Europe and Russia); Warner Sogefilms (Spain); Entertainment Film Distributors (United Kingdom); Roadshow Entertainment (Australia and Greece); Metropolitan Filmexport (France); Svensk Filmindustri (Scandivania); RCV Entertainment (Netherlands); Kinepolis Film Distribution (Belgium); Nippon Herald Films (Japan)
December 14, 2001	The Lord of the Rings: The Fellowship of the Ring	co-production with WingNut Films; Inducted into the National Film Registry in 2021	New Line Cinema (United States); Alliance Atlantis (Canada); Warner Bros. Pictures (Germany, Austria, Switzerland, Eastern Europe, Russia, Latin America excluding Mexico, and select Asian territories including India and Singapore); Videocine (Mexico); Aurum Producciones (Spain); Entertainment Film Distributors (United Kingdom); Roadshow Entertainment (Australia and Greece); Metropolitan Filmexport (France); Medusa Film (Italy); A-Film Distribution (Netherlands); Cinéart (Belgium); Svensk Filmindustri (Scandinavia); Nippon Herald Films (Japan); China Film Group Corporation (China); Cinema Service and Taewon Entertainment (Korea); Mongkol Major (Thailand); Umut Sanat (Turkey); Era Communications (Hong Kong)
December 14, 2001	I Am Sam		New Line Cinema (United States); Alliance Atlantis (Canada); Warner Bros. Pictures (Germany, Switzerland, Eastern Europe and Russia); Tripictures (Spain); Entertainment Film Distributors (United Kingdom); Roadshow Entertainment (Australia and Greece); Metropolitan Filmexport (France); Svensk Filmindustri (Scandivania); RCV Entertainment (Netherlands); Kinepolis Film Distribution (Belgium); Buena Vista International (Korea)
February 15, 2002	John Q.		New Line Cinema (United States); Alliance Atlantis (Canada); Warner Bros. Pictures (Germany, Switzerland, Eastern Europe and Russia); Entertainment Film Distributors (United Kingdom); Roadshow Entertainment (Australia and Greece); Metropolitan Filmexport (France); Nexo Pictures (Italy); Svensk Filmindustri (Scandivania); Paradiso Filmed Entertainment (Benelux); Cineworld Entertainment (Korea)
March 8, 2002	All About the Benjamins	co-production with Cube Vision	New Line Cinema (United States); Alliance Atlantis (Canada); GAGA Communications (Japan)
March 22, 2002	Blade II	co-production with Marvel Entertainment	New Line Cinema (United States); Alliance Atlantis (Canada); Warner Bros. Pictures (Germany, Switzerland, Eastern Europe and Russia); Tripictures (Spain); Entertainment Film Distributors (United Kingdom); Metropolitan Filmexport (France); Eagle Pictures (Italy); Svensk Filmindustri (Scandivania); RCV Entertainment (Netherlands); Kinepolis Film Distribution (Belgium); Nippon Herald Films (Japan); Cineworld Entertainment (Korea)
April 26, 2002	Jason X		New Line Cinema (United States); Alliance Atlantis (Canada); Aurum Producciones (Spain); Entertainment Film Distributors (United Kingdom); Roadshow Entertainment (Australia and Greece); Metropolitan Filmexport (France); Paradiso Filmed Entertainment (Benelux); Svensk Filmindustri (Scandinavia)
June 28, 2002	Mr. Deeds	co-production with Columbia Pictures and Happy Madison Productions	Sony Pictures Releasing
July 26, 2002	Austin Powers in Goldmember		New Line Cinema (United States); Alliance Atlantis (Canada); Warner Bros. Pictures (Germany, Switzerland, Eastern Europe and Russia); Entertainment Film Distributors (United Kingdom); Roadshow Entertainment (Australia and Greece); Metropolitan Filmexport (France); Eagle Pictures (Italy); Svensk Filmindustri (Scandivania); RCV Entertainment (Netherlands); Kinepolis Film Distribution (Belgium); Star Entertainment (India)
August 23, 2002	Simone		New Line Cinema (United States); Alliance Atlantis (Canada); Aurum Producciones (Spain); Entertainment Film Distributors (United Kingdom); Roadshow Entertainment (Australia and Greece); Metropolitan Filmexport (France); Svensk Filmindustri (Scandivania); RCV Entertainment (Netherlands); Cineworld Entertainment (Korea)
September 20, 2002	Cheats		New Line Cinema (United States); Alliance Atlantis (Canada)
October 11, 2002	Knockaround Guys		New Line Cinema (United States); Alliance Atlantis (Canada); Aurum Producciones (Spain); Metropolitan Filmexport (France)
November 1, 2002	Punch-Drunk Love	co-production with Revolution Studios	Columbia Pictures (Worldwide excluding U.S. television and VOD, Germany, Switzerland, Scandinavia, Portugal, Israel and Japan theatrically and on home media); Senator Film (Germany); Svensk Filmindustri (Scandinavia); Lusomundo (Portugal); Elite Film (Switzerland); Forum Film (Israel); Toho-Towa (Japan theatrically); Pony Canyon (Japan on home media)
November 22, 2002	Friday After Next	co-production with Cube Vision	New Line Cinema (United States); Alliance Atlantis (Canada)
December 13, 2002	About Schmidt		New Line Cinema (United States); Alliance Atlantis (Canada); Warner Bros. Pictures (Germany, Austria, Switzerland, Eastern Europe and Russia); Videocine (Mexico); Tripictures (Spain); Entertainment Film Distributors (United Kingdom); Metropolitan Filmexport (France); Svensk Filmindustri (Scandivania); Paradiso Filmed Entertainment (Benelux); GAGA Communications (Japan)
December 18, 2002	The Lord of the Rings: The Two Towers	co-production with WingNut Films	New Line Cinema (United States); Alliance Atlantis (Canada); Warner Bros. Pictures (Germany, Switzerland, Eastern Europe, Russia, Latin America excluding Mexico, and select Asian territories including India and Singapore); Videocine (Mexico); Aurum Producciones (Spain); Entertainment Film Distributors (United Kingdom); Roadshow Entertainment (Australia and Greece); Metropolitan Filmexport (France); Medusa Film (Italy); A-Film Distribution (Netherlands); Cinéart (Belgium); Svensk Filmindustri (Scandinavia); Nippon Herald Films (Japan); CMC Magnetics Corporation (Hong Kong); Taewon Entertainment (Korea); Umut Sanat (Turkey)
January 31, 2003	Final Destination 2		New Line Cinema (United States); Alliance Atlantis (Canada); Warner Bros. Pictures (Germany, Switzerland, Eastern Europe and Russia); Entertainment Film Distributors (United Kingdom); Roadshow Entertainment (Australia); Metropolitan Filmexport (France); Eagle Pictures (Italy); Svensk Filmindustri (Scandivania); RCV Entertainment (Netherlands); Kinepolis Film Distribution (Belgium); Videocine (Mexico); PlayArte Pictures (Brazil); United International Pictures (Korea); Tripictures (Spain); GAGA-Humax (Japan); Pioneer Films (Philippines)
March 14, 2003	Willard	co-production with Hard Eight Pictures	New Line Cinema (United States); Alliance Atlantis (Canada); Tripictures (Spain); Entertainment Film Distributors (United Kingdom); Metropolitan Filmexport (France)
April 4, 2003	A Man Apart		New Line Cinema (United States); Alliance Atlantis (Canada); Warner Bros. Pictures (Germany, Switzerland, Eastern Europe and Russia); Entertainment Film Distributors (United Kingdom); Roadshow Entertainment (Australia); Metropolitan Filmexport (France); RCV Entertainment (Netherlands); Cineworld Entertainment (Korea); GAGA-Humax (Japan); PlayArte Pictures (Brazil)
April 25, 2003	The Real Cancun		New Line Cinema (United States); Alliance Atlantis (Canada); Metropolitan Filmexport (France)
June 13, 2003	Dumb and Dumberer: When Harry Met Lloyd		New Line Cinema (United States); Alliance Atlantis (Canada); Warner Bros. Pictures (Germany, Austria, Switzerland, Eastern Europe and Russia); Tripictures (Spain); Entertainment Film Distributors (United Kingdom); Metropolitan Filmexport (France); RCV Entertainment (Netherlands); Kinepolis Film Distribution (Belgium)
July 18, 2003	How to Deal	North American distribution only; co-production with Focus Features and Radar Pictures	New Line Cinema (United States); Alliance Atlantis (Canada)
August 15, 2003	Freddy vs. Jason		New Line Cinema (United States); Alliance Atlantis (Canada); Warner Bros. Pictures (Germany, Switzerland, Eastern Europe and Russia); Tripictures (Spain); Entertainment Film Distributors (United Kingdom); Roadshow Entertainment (Australia and Greece); Metropolitan Filmexport (France); RCV Entertainment (Netherlands); Kinepolis Film Distribution (Belgium)
September 26, 2003	Secondhand Lions		New Line Cinema (United States); Alliance Atlantis (Canada); Tripictures (Spain); Entertainment Film Distributors (United Kingdom); Roadshow Entertainment (Australia and Greece); Metropolitan Filmexport (France); RCV Entertainment (Netherlands); Kinepolis Film Distribution (Belgium)
October 17, 2003	The Texas Chainsaw Massacre	North American and Italian distribution only; co-production with Focus Features, Platinum Dunes and Radar Pictures	New Line Cinema (United States); Alliance Atlantis (Canada); Eagle Pictures (Italy)
November 7, 2003	Elf		New Line Cinema (United States); Alliance Atlantis (Canada); Warner Bros. Pictures (Germany, Austria, Switzerland, Eastern Europe and Russia); Tripictures (Spain); Entertainment Film Distributors (United Kingdom and Ireland); Roadshow Entertainment (Australia and Greece); Metropolitan Filmexport (France); Eagle Pictures (Italy); A-Film Distribution (Netherlands); Cinéart (Belgium)
December 17, 2003	The Lord of the Rings: The Return of the King	co-production with WingNut Films	New Line Cinema (United States); Alliance Atlantis (Canada); Warner Bros. Pictures (Germany, Austria, Switzerland, Eastern Europe, Russia, Latin America excluding Mexico, and select Asian territories including India and Singapore); Videocine (Mexico); Aurum Producciones (Spain); Entertainment Film Distributors (United Kingdom and Ireland); Metropolitan Filmexport (France); Medusa Film (Italy); A-Film Distribution (Netherlands); Cinéart (Belgium); Svensk Filmindustri (Scandinavia); Nippon Herald Films (Japan); Cinema Service and Taewon Entertainment (Korea); Mongkol Major (Thailand)
January 23, 2004	The Butterfly Effect	distribution in North America, South Africa, France, Germany, Austria, Switzerland, Spain, the Benelux, Hong Kong and Taiwan only; co-production with FilmEngine and BenderSpink	New Line Cinema (United States); Alliance Atlantis (Canada); Warner Bros. Pictures (South Africa, Germany, Austria and Switzerland); Metropolitan Filmexport (France); Tripictures (Spain); Paradiso Filmed Entertainment (Benelux); Deltamac (Hong Kong); 20th Century Fox and CMC Entertainment (Taiwan)
February 13, 2004	Highwaymen		New Line Cinema (United States); Alliance Atlantis (Canada); Tripictures (Spain); Entertainment Film Distributors (United Kingdom); Metropolitan Filmexport (France); Eagle Pictures (Italy); RCV Entertainment (Netherlands)
April 30, 2004	Laws of Attraction	North American, U.K., Irish, Australian, New Zealand and South African distribution only; co-production with Initial Entertainment Group, Intermedia Films, Irish DreamTime and Mobius Pictures	New Line Cinema (United States); Alliance Atlantis (Canada); Entertainment Film Distributors (United Kingdom and Ireland); Roadshow Films (Australia and New Zealand); Nu Metro (South Africa)
June 25, 2004	The Notebook		New Line Cinema (United States); Alliance Atlantis (Canada); Warner Bros. Pictures (Germany, Switzerland, Eastern Europe and Russia); Tripictures (Spain); Entertainment Film Distributors (United Kingdom); Roadshow Entertainment (Australia and New Zealand); Metropolitan Filmexport (France); 01 Distribution (Italy); Svensk Filmindustri (Scandivania); RCV Entertainment (Netherlands); Kinepolis Film Distribution (Belgium); WEG Entertainment (India); Pioneer Films (Philippines); Village Films (Greece and Cyprus)
July 30, 2004	Harold & Kumar Go to White Castle	North American distribution only; co-production with Senator International	New Line Cinema (United States); Alliance Atlantis (Canada)
September 10, 2004	Cellular	co-production with Electric Entertainment	New Line Cinema (United States); Alliance Atlantis (Canada); Warner Bros. Pictures (Germany, Austria, Switzerland, Eastern Europe and Russia); Tripictures (Spain); Entertainment Film Distributors (United Kingdom); Metropolitan Filmexport (France); RCV Entertainment (Netherlands); Eagle Pictures (Italy); Kinepolis Film Distribution (Belgium); E-City Films (India); Pioneer Films (Philippines)
October 8, 2004	Raise Your Voice	North American, Filipino and Italian distribution only; co-production with FilmEngine and Brookwell McNamara Entertainment	New Line Cinema (United States); Alliance Atlantis (Canada); Eagle Pictures (Italy); Pioneer Films (Philippines)
November 12, 2004	After the Sunset		New Line Cinema (United States); Alliance Atlantis (Canada); Warner Bros. Pictures (Germany, Switzerland, Eastern Europe and Russia); Tripictures (Spain); Entertainment Film Distributors (United Kingdom); Svensk Filmindustri (Scandivania); Paradiso Filmed Entertainment (Benelux); Multivision Multimedia (India)
December 8, 2004	Blade: Trinity	co-production with Marvel Entertainment	New Line Cinema (United States); Alliance Atlantis (Canada); Warner Bros. Pictures (Germany, Austria, Switzerland, Eastern Europe and Russia); Tripictures (Spain); Entertainment Film Distributors (United Kingdom); Metropolitan Filmexport (France); Svensk Filmindustri (Scandivania); RCV Entertainment (Netherlands); Kinepolis Film Distribution (Belgium)
February 18, 2005	Son of the Mask	co-production with Radar Pictures and Dark Horse Entertainment	New Line Cinema (United States); Alliance Atlantis (Canada); Warner Bros. Pictures (Germany, Austria, Switzerland, Eastern Europe and Russia); Tripictures (Spain); Entertainment Film Distributors (United Kingdom); Pathé Distribution (France); Svensk Filmindustri (Scandivania); RCV Entertainment (Netherlands); Kinepolis Film Distribution (Belgium); Superfine Films (India); Pioneer Films (Philippines)
March 16, 2005	The Upside of Anger	North American distribution only	New Line Cinema (United States); Alliance Atlantis (Canada)
April 20, 2005	King's Ransom		
May 11, 2005	Monster-in-Law		New Line Cinema (United States); Alliance Atlantis (Canada); Warner Bros. Pictures (Germany, Austria, Switzerland, Eastern Europe and Russia); Tripictures (Spain); Entertainment Film Distributors (United Kingdom); Metropolitan Filmexport (France); Svensk Filmindustri (Scandivania); Paradiso Filmed Entertainment (Benelux); Multivision Multimedia (India); Pioneer Films (Philippines)
July 15, 2005	Wedding Crashers		New Line Cinema (United States); Alliance Atlantis (Canada); Warner Bros. Pictures (Germany, Switzerland, Eastern Europe and Russia); Tripictures (Spain); Entertainment Film Distributors (United Kingdom); Metropolitan Filmexport (France); Eagle Pictures (Italy); Svensk Filmindustri (Scandivania); A-Film Distribution (Netherlands); Cinéart (Belgium); WEG Entertainment (India)
September 9, 2005	The Man		New Line Cinema (United States); Alliance Atlantis (Canada); Tripictures (Spain); Entertainment Film Distributors (United Kingdom); Metropolitan Filmexport (France); Eagle Pictures (Italy); Paradiso Filmed Entertainment (Benelux)
September 23, 2005	A History of Violence		New Line Cinema (United States); Alliance Atlantis (Canada); Warner Bros. Pictures (Germany, Switzerland, Eastern Europe and Russia); Entertainment Film Distributors (United Kingdom); Metropolitan Filmexport (France); Svensk Filmindustri (Scandivania); RCV Entertainment (Netherlands); Kinepolis Film Distribution (Belgium); E-City Films (India)
October 14, 2005	Domino	North American distribution only; produced by Metropolitan Filmexport, Scott Free Productions and Davis Films	New Line Cinema (United States); Alliance Atlantis (Canada)
October 31, 2005	National Lampoon's Adam & Eve	North American distribution only	New Line Cinema (United States); Alliance Atlantis (Canada)
November 23, 2005	Just Friends	North American distribution only	New Line Cinema (United States); Alliance Atlantis (Canada)
December 25, 2005	The New World		New Line Cinema (United States); Alliance Atlantis (Canada); Warner Bros. Pictures (Germany, Austria, Switzerland, Eastern Europe and Russia); Tripictures (Spain); Entertainment Film Distributors (United Kingdom); Roadshow Entertainment (Australia and Greece); Metropolitan Filmexport (France); Svensk Filmindustri (Scandivania); RCV Entertainment (Netherlands); Kinepolis Film Distribution (Belgium); E-City Films (India); Pioneer Films (Philippines)
February 10, 2006	Final Destination 3		New Line Cinema (United States); Alliance Atlantis (Canada); Warner Bros. Pictures (Germany, Switzerland, Eastern Europe and Russia); Tripictures (Spain); Entertainment Film Distributors (United Kingdom); Roadshow Entertainment (Australia and Greece); Metropolitan Filmexport (France); RCV Entertainment (Netherlands); Kinepolis Film Distribution (Belgium); Multivision Multimedia (India)
February 24, 2006	Running Scared	North American distribution only	New Line Cinema (United States); Alliance Atlantis (Canada)
April 7, 2006	Take the Lead		New Line Cinema (United States); Alliance Atlantis (Canada); Warner Bros. Pictures (Germany, Switzerland, Eastern Europe and Russia); Tripictures (Spain); Entertainment Film Distributors (United Kingdom); Metropolitan Filmexport (France); Eagle Pictures (Italy); Svensk Filmindustri (Scandivania); Paradiso Filmed Entertainment (Benelux); Multivision Multimedia (India)
May 5, 2006	Hoot	co-production with Walden Media and The Kennedy/Marshall Company	New Line Cinema (United States); Alliance Atlantis (Canada)
August 18, 2006	Snakes on a Plane	co-production with Mutual Film Company	New Line Cinema (United States); Alliance Atlantis (Canada); Warner Bros. Pictures (Germany, Austria, Switzerland, Eastern Europe and Russia); Entertainment Film Distributors (United Kingdom); Roadshow Entertainment (Australia and Greece); Metropolitan Filmexport (France); Svensk Filmindustri (Scandivania); RCV Entertainment (Netherlands); Kinepolis Film Distribution (Belgium); WEG Entertainment (India)
August 25, 2006	How to Eat Fried Worms	co-production with Walden Media	New Line Cinema (United States); Alliance Atlantis (Canada)
September 4, 2006	The Texas Chainsaw Massacre: The Beginning	co-production with Platinum Dunes	New Line Cinema (United States); Alliance Atlantis (Canada); Warner Bros. Pictures (Germany, Austria, Switzerland, Eastern Europe and Russia); Entertainment Film Distributors (United Kingdom); Roadshow Entertainment (Australia and Greece); Metropolitan Filmexport (France); Eagle Pictures (Italy); RCV Entertainment (Netherlands); Kinepolis Film Distribution (Belgium); Pioneer Films (Philippines)
November 1, 2006	Little Children		New Line Cinema (United States); Alliance Atlantis (Canada); Warner Bros. Pictures (Germany, Austria, Switzerland, Eastern Europe and Russia); Tripictures (Spain); Entertainment Film Distributors (United Kingdom); Roadshow Entertainment (Australia and Greece); Metropolitan Filmexport (France); A-Film Distribution (Netherlands); Cinéart (Belgium); Svensk Filmindustri (Scandinavia)
November 22, 2006	Tenacious D in The Pick of Destiny		New Line Cinema (United States); Alliance Atlantis (Canada); Warner Bros. Pictures (Germany, Switzerland, Eastern Europe and Russia); Tripictures (Spain); Entertainment Film Distributors (United Kingdom); Metropolitan Filmexport (France); Svensk Filmindustri (Scandivania); RCV Entertainment (Netherlands)
December 6, 2006	The Nativity Story		New Line Cinema (United States); Alliance Atlantis (Canada); Warner Bros. Pictures (Germany, Switzerland, Eastern Europe and Russia); Tripictures (Spain); Entertainment Film Distributors (United Kingdom); Metropolitan Filmexport (France); Benelux Film Distributors (Benelux)
January 1, 2007	Code Name: The Cleaner	North American, French, Benelux and Taiwanese distribution only; co-production with FilmEngine and Rat Entertainment	New Line Cinema (United States); Alliance Atlantis (Canada); Metropolitan Film & Video (France); Independent Films (Netherlands); Belga Films (Belgium); Appaluse Entertainment (Taiwan)
February 23, 2007	The Number 23	co-production with Contrafilm and Film Films	New Line Cinema (United States); Alliance Atlantis (Canada); Warner Bros. Pictures (Germany, Switzerland, Eastern Europe and Russia); Entertainment Film Distributors (United Kingdom); Metropolitan Filmexport (France); 01 Distribution (Italy); Svensk Filmindustri (Scandivania); Paradiso Filmed Entertainment (Benelux)
March 2, 2007	Full of It	North American distribution only; co-production with Relativity Media	New Line Cinema (United States); Alliance Atlantis (Canada)
March 23, 2007	The Last Mimzy		New Line Cinema (United States); Alliance Atlantis (Canada); Warner Bros. Pictures (Germany, Austria, Switzerland, Eastern Europe and Russia); Entertainment Film Distributors (United Kingdom); Metropolitan Filmexport (France); Svensk Filmindustri (Scandivania); Independent Films (Netherlands)
April 20, 2007	Fracture	co-production with Castle Rock Entertainment	New Line Cinema (United States); Alliance Atlantis (Canada); Warner Bros. Pictures (Germany, Switzerland, Eastern Europe and Russia); Entertainment Film Distributors (United Kingdom); Metropolitan Filmexport (France); Svensk Filmindustri (Scandivania); RCV Entertainment (Netherlands); Kinepolis Film Distribution (Belgium)
July 20, 2007	Hairspray		New Line Cinema (United States); Alliance Atlantis (Canada); Warner Bros. Pictures (Germany, Switzerland and Eastern Europe); Entertainment Film Distributors (United Kingdom); Metropolitan Filmexport (France); Svensk Filmindustri (Scandivania); RCV Entertainment (Netherlands); Kinepolis Film Distribution (Belgium)
August 10, 2007	Rush Hour 3		New Line Cinema (United States); Alliance Films (Canada); Warner Bros. Pictures (Germany, Switzerland, Eastern Europe and Russia); Aurum Producciones (Spain); Entertainment Film Distributors (United Kingdom); Metropolitan Filmexport (France); Svensk Filmindustri (Scandivania); Paradiso Filmed Entertainment (Benelux); Multivision Multimedia (India)
September 7, 2007	Shoot 'Em Up		New Line Cinema (United States); Alliance Films (Canada); Warner Bros. Pictures (Germany, Switzerland, Eastern Europe and Russia); Entertainment Film Distributors (United Kingdom); Metropolitan Filmexport (France); Eagle Pictures (Italy); Svensk Filmindustri (Scandivania); Independent Films (Netherlands); Belga Films (Belgium); E-City Films (India)
September 14, 2007	Mr. Woodcock		New Line Cinema (United States); Alliance Films (Canada); Entertainment Film Distributors (United Kingdom); Metropolitan Filmexport (France); Svensk Filmindustri (Scandivania); RCV Entertainment (Netherlands)
October 26, 2007	Rendition	co-production with Level 1 Entertainment and Anonymous Content	New Line Cinema (United States); Alliance Films (Canada); Warner Bros. Pictures (Germany, Switzerland, Eastern Europe and Russia); Entertainment Film Distributors (United Kingdom); Metropolitan Filmexport (France); Eagle Pictures (Italy); Svensk Filmindustri (Scandivania); RCV Entertainment (Netherlands); Kinepolis Film Distribution (Belgium)
November 2, 2007	Martian Child		New Line Cinema (United States); Alliance Films (Canada); Warner Bros. Pictures (Germany, Switzerland, Eastern Europe and Russia); Entertainment Film Distributors (United Kingdom); Metropolitan Filmexport (France); Independent Films (Netherlands); Multivision Multimedia (India); Tripictures (Spain); Pris Audiovisuais (Portugal); Mongkol Major >(Thailand); Eagle Pictures (Italy); Gussi Films (Mexico); PlayArte Pictures (Brazil); Distribution Company (Argentina); Roadshow Entertainment (Australia and Greece); ARM Distribution (Taiwan); 35 milim (Turkey); Bazuca Films (Chile); NuMetro Distribution (South Africa); CJ Entertainment (Korea)
November 16, 2007	Love in the Time of Cholera	North American distribution only	New Line Cinema (United States); Alliance Films (Canada)
December 7, 2007	The Golden Compass	co-production with Scholastic Productions	New Line Cinema (United States); Alliance Films (Canada); Warner Bros. Pictures (Germany, Austria, Switzerland, Eastern Europe, Russia and India); Tripictures (Spain); Entertainment Film Distributors (United Kingdom); Metropolitan Filmexport (France); Rai Cinema and 01 Distribution (Italy); RCV Entertainment (Netherlands); Kinepolis Film Distribution (Belgium); Svensk Filmindustri (Scandinavia); ZON Lusomundo Audiovisuais (Portugal); Roadshow Entertainment (Australia and Greece); Blitz (former Yugoslavia); Medyavizyon (Turkey); Mongkol Major (Thailand); PlayArte Pictures (Brazil); GAGA and Shochiku (Japan); NuMetro Distribution (South Africa); Lotte Entertainment (Korea); Long Shong Entertainment Multimedia (Taiwan); Gussi Films (Mexico); Panasia Films (Hong Kong); China Film Group Corporation (China); Distribution Company (Argentina); Myndform (Iceland); GPI (Baltics)
February 1, 2008	Over Her Dead Body	North American distribution only; co-production with Gold Circle Films	New Line Cinema (United States); Alliance Films (Canada)
February 22, 2008	Be Kind Rewind	North American distribution only; produced by Partizan Films	New Line Cinema (United States); Alliance Films (Canada)
February 29, 2008	Semi-Pro	co-production with Mosaic Media Group; last New Line Cinema film released before becoming a division of Warner Bros.	New Line Cinema (United States); Alliance Films (Canada); Entertainment Film Distributors (United Kingdom); Svensk Filmindustri (Scandivania)
April 25, 2008	Harold & Kumar Escape from Guantanamo Bay	co-production with Mandate Pictures; first New Line Cinema film distributed by Warner Bros.	Warner Bros. Pictures (United States, Germany, Switzerland, Eastern Europe, CIS and Singapore); Alliance Films (Canada); Tripictures (Spain); Entertainment Film Distributors (United Kingdom); Metropolitan Filmexport (France)
May 30, 2008	Sex and the City	co-production with HBO Films	Warner Bros. Pictures (United States, Chile, Germany, Switzerland, Eastern Europe, CIS, India, Singapore and Thailand); Alliance Films (Canada); Entertainment Film Distributors (United Kingdom); Metropolitan Filmexport (France); Svensk Filmindustri (Scandivania); Paradiso Filmed Entertainment (Benelux)
July 2, 2008	Kit Kittredge: An American Girl	co-production with HBO Films and Picturehouse	
July 11, 2008	Journey to the Center of the Earth	co-production with Walden Media	Warner Bros. Pictures (United States, Germany, Switzerland, Benelux, Eastern Europe, CIS, China and Singapore); Alliance Films (Canada); Tripictures (Spain); Entertainment Film Distributors (United Kingdom); Metropolitan Filmexport (France); Svensk Filmindustri (Scandivania); E-City Films (India)
September 12, 2008	The Women	North American distribution with Picturehouse only	Warner Bros. Pictures (United States); Alliance Films (Canada)
September 19, 2008	Appaloosa		Warner Bros. Pictures (United States, Germany, Switzerland, Eastern Europe, CIS and Singapore); Alliance Films (Canada); Tripictures (Spain); Entertainment Film Distributors (United Kingdom); Metropolitan Filmexport (France); 01 Distribution (Italy); Paradiso Filmed Entertainment (Benelux)
October 24, 2008	Pride and Glory		Warner Bros. Pictures (United States, Chile, Germany, Switzerland, Eastern Europe, CIS, Turkey theatrically, Japan and Singapore); Alliance Films (Canada); Tripictures (Spain); Entertainment Film Distributors (United Kingdom); Metropolitan Filmexport (France); Eagle Pictures (Italy); Svensk Filmindustri (Scandivania); RCV Entertainment (Netherlands); Kinepolis Film Distribution (Belgium); Multivision Multimedia (India)
November 26, 2008	Four Christmases	co-production with Spyglass Entertainment	Warner Bros. Pictures (United States, Chile, Germany, Switzerland, Italy, Benelux, Eastern Europe, CIS, Turkey, India, Hong Kong, Japan and Singapore); Alliance Films (Canada); Entertainment Film Distributors (United Kingdom); Roadshow Entertainment (Australia and Greece); Metropolitan Filmexport (France); Tripictures (Spain); Svensk Filmindustri (Scandinavia); PlayArte Pictures (Brazil); Videocine (Mexico)
January 19, 2009	Amusement	distributed by Picturehouse	
January 26, 2009	Inkheart		Warner Bros. Pictures (United States, Chile, Germany, Switzerland, Eastern Europe, CIS, India and Singapore); Alliance Films (Canada); Tripictures (Spain); Entertainment Film Distributors (United Kingdom); Roadshow Entertainment (Australia and Greece); Metropolitan Filmexport (France); Paradiso Filmed Entertainment (Benelux); PlayArte Pictures (Brazil); Videocine (Mexico); Svensk Filmindustri (Scandinavia)
February 6, 2009	He's Just Not That into You	co-production with Flower Films	Warner Bros. Pictures (United States, Chile, Peru, Germany, Switzerland, Eastern Europe, CIS, Turkey, Japan, India, Singapore and Thailand); Alliance Films (Canada); Tripictures (Spain); Entertainment Film Distributors (United Kingdom); Roadshow Entertainment (Australia and Greece); Paradiso Filmed Entertainment (Benelux); Metropolitan Filmexport (France); Svensk Filmindustri (Scandinavia)
February 13, 2009	Friday the 13th (Note: Skydance now owns worldwide rights to this film, having acquired Paramount Global in 2025 and Warner Bros. Discovery in 2026.)	co-production with Paramount Pictures and Platinum Dunes	Warner Bros. Pictures (United States and Canada); Paramount Pictures (International)
April 17, 2009	17 Again	co-production with Offspring Entertainment	Warner Bros. Pictures (Worldwide excluding Canada, Mexico, Brazil, Argentina, Colombia, Ecuador, Uruguay, Venezuela, United Kingdom, Australia, France, Spain, Andorra, the Benelux, Portugal, the Nordics, Greece, the Middle East, Israel, Taiwan, Malaysia and the Philippines); Alliance Films (Canada); Tripictures (Spain); Entertainment Film Distributors (United Kingdom); Roadshow Entertainment (Australia and Greece); RCV Entertainment (Netherlands); Kinepolis Film Distribution (Belgium); Metropolitan Filmexport (France); Svensk Filmindustri (Scandinavia); PlayArte Pictures (Brazil); Videocine (Mexico)
May 1, 2009	Ghosts of Girlfriends Past		Warner Bros. Pictures (United States, Mexico, Chile, Peru, Central America, Germany, Switzerland, Italy, Eastern Europe, Baltics, CIS, Israel, Turkey and Asia excluding Taiwan and Philippines); Alliance Films (Canada); Tripictures (Spain); Entertainment Film Distributors (United Kingdom); Roadshow Entertainment (Australia and Greece); Metropolitan Filmexport (France); Eagle Pictures (Italy); RCV Entertainment (Netherlands); Belga Films (Belgium); Svensk Filmindustri (Scandinavia); Distribution Company (Argentina); Cine Colombia (Colombia); Importadora del Resado (Ecuador); Times Media Films (South Africa); Pioneer Films (Philippines); Long Shong Entertainment Multimedia (Taiwan); PlayArte Pictures (Brazil); Gulf Film (Middle East)
June 26, 2009	My Sister's Keeper		Warner Bros. Pictures (Worldwide excluding Brazil, Argentina, Colombia, Ecuador, Uruguay, Venezuela, United Kingdom, Australia, South Africa, France, Spain, Scandinavia, Greece, Japan, Taiwan and Philippines); Tripictures (Spain); Entertainment Film Distributors (United Kingdom); Roadshow Entertainment (Australia and Greece); Metropolitan Filmexport (France); PlayArte Pictures (Brazil); Svensk Filmindustri (Scandinavia); Distribution Company (Argentina); Cine Colombia (Colombia); Importadora del Resado (Ecuador); Times Media Films (South Africa); Pioneer Films (Philippines); Long Shong Entertainment Multimedia (Taiwan); GAGA Communications (Japan)
August 14, 2009	The Time Traveler's Wife	co-production with Plan B Entertainment	Warner Bros. Pictures (United States, Chile, Peru, Bolivia, Central America, Germany, Switzerland, Benelux, Eastern Europe, CIS, Turkey, India, Japan, Singapore and Thailand); Alliance Films (Canada); Tripictures (Spain); Entertainment Film Distributors (United Kingdom); Roadshow Entertainment (Australia and Greece); Metropolitan Filmexport (France); PlayArte Pictures (Brazil); Svensk Filmindustri (Scandinavia); Distribution Company (Argentina); Cine Colombia (Colombia); Importadora del Resado (Ecuador); Times Media Films (South Africa); Pioneer Films (Philippines); Long Shong Entertainment Multimedia (Taiwan); Lark Films Distribution (Hong Kong); Gussi Films (Mexico); Next Entertainment World (Korea); Golden Screen Cinemas (Malaysia); Gulf Film (Middle East); Forum Film (Israel)
August 28, 2009	The Final Destination		Warner Bros. Pictures (Worldwide excluding Brazil, Argentina, Colombia, Ecuador, Uruguay, Venezuela, U.K., Australia, South Africa, France, Spain, Scandinavia, Greece, Japan, Taiwan and Philippines); Tripictures (Spain); Entertainment Film Distributors (United Kingdom); Metropolitan Filmexport (France); Roadshow Entertainment (Australia and Greece); PlayArte Pictures (Brazil); Svensk Filmindustri (Scandinavia); Distribution Company (Argentina); Cine Colombia (Colombia); Importadora del Resado (Ecuador); Times Media Films (South Africa); Pioneer Films (Philippines); Long Shong Entertainment Multimedia (Taiwan); GAGA Communications (Japan)

== 2010s ==
Release date	Title	Notes	Distributor(s)
February 12, 2010	Valentine's Day	co-production with Wayne Rice Films and Karz Entertainment	Warner Bros. Pictures
April 30, 2010	A Nightmare on Elm Street	co-production with Platinum Dunes	Warner Bros. Pictures
May 27, 2010	Sex and the City 2	co-production with Village Roadshow Pictures and HBO Films	Warner Bros. Pictures (Worldwide); Roadshow Entertainment (Australia, Greece and Singapore)
September 3, 2010	Going the Distance	co-production with Offspring Entertainment	Warner Bros. Pictures
January 28, 2011	The Rite	co-production with Contrafilm	Warner Bros. Pictures
February 25, 2011	Hall Pass	co-production with Conundrum Entertainment	Warner Bros. Pictures
July 8, 2011	Horrible Bosses	co-production with Rat Entertainment	Warner Bros. Pictures
August 12, 2011	Final Destination 5	co-production with Practical Pictures and Zide/Perry Productions	Warner Bros. Pictures
November 4, 2011	A Very Harold & Kumar 3D Christmas	co-production with Kingsgate Films and Mandate Pictures	Warner Bros. Pictures
December 9, 2011	New Year's Eve	co-production with Wayne Rice Films and Karz Entertainment	Warner Bros. Pictures
February 10, 2012	Journey 2: The Mysterious Island	co-production with Walden Media and Contrafilm	Warner Bros. Pictures
June 15, 2012	Rock of Ages	co-production with Offspring Entertainment and Maguire Entertainment	Warner Bros. Pictures
December 14, 2012	The Hobbit: An Unexpected Journey (Note: Co-owned by Warner Bros. and MGM)	co-production with Metro-Goldwyn-Mayer and WingNut Films	Warner Bros. Pictures (Worldwide excluding international television and digital, Scandinavia, Portugal, Poland, Hungary, Bulgaria, Romania, Israel and the Middle East); MGM Television (International television and digital); SF Studios (Scandinavia); ZON Lusomundo (Portugal); Forum Film (Poland, Hungary, Bulgaria, Romania and Israel); Gulf Film (Middle East)
March 8, 2013	Jack the Giant Slayer	co-production with Legendary Pictures, Original Film, Big Kid Pictures and Bad Hat Harry	Warner Bros. Pictures
March 15, 2013	The Incredible Burt Wonderstone	co-production with Benderspink and Carousel Productions	Warner Bros. Pictures
July 19, 2013	The Conjuring	co-production with The Safran Company and Evergreen Media Group	Warner Bros. Pictures
August 7, 2013	We're the Millers	co-production with Newman/Tooley Productions, Slap Happy Productions, Heyday Films and Benderspink	Warner Bros. Pictures
December 13, 2013	The Hobbit: The Desolation of Smaug	co-production with Metro-Goldwyn-Mayer and WingNut Films	Warner Bros. Pictures (Worldwide excluding international television and digital, Scandinavia, Portugal, Poland, Hungary, Bulgaria, Romania, Israel and the Middle East); MGM Television (International television and digital); SF Studios (Scandinavia); ZON Lusomundo (Portugal); Forum Film (Poland, Hungary, Bulgaria, Romania and Israel); Gulf Film (Middle East)
May 2, 2014	The Secret Life of Walter Mitty	associate credit only; produced by Samuel Goldwyn Films and Red Hour Films	20th Century Fox
July 2, 2014	Tammy	co-production with Gary Sanchez Productions and On the Day Productions	Warner Bros. Pictures
August 8, 2014	Into the Storm	co-production with Village Roadshow Pictures and Broken Road Productions	Warner Bros. Pictures (Worldwide); Roadshow Entertainment (Australia, Greece and Singapore)
August 22, 2014	If I Stay	co-production with Metro-Goldwyn-Mayer	Warner Bros. Pictures (Worldwide theatrical excluding Scandinavia, Portugal, Poland, Hungary, the Czech Republic, Slovakia, Bulgaria, Romania, Israel and the Middle East); Metro-Goldwyn-Mayer (Worldwide on home media, television and digital); SF Studios (Scandinavia); NOS Audiovisuais (Portugal); Forum Film (Poland, Hungary, the Czech Republic, Slovakia, Bulgaria, Romania and Israel); Gulf Film (Middle East)
October 3, 2014	Annabelle	co-production with Atomic Monster and The Safran Company	Warner Bros. Pictures
November 14, 2014	Dumb and Dumber To	associate credit only; produced by Red Granite Pictures and Conundrum Entertainment	Universal Pictures (United States, Canada, United Kingdom, Australia, Germany, Switzerland and Spain); Crystal Brook Distribution (South Africa); Metropolitan Filmexport (France); Leone Film Group, Rai Cinema and 01 Distribution (Italy); Dutch FilmWorks (Benelux); Pris Audiovisuais (Portugal); Gussi Films (Latin America); Gulf Film (Middle East); GPI (the Baltics); West Film (CIS); Mis. Label (Scandinavia); Feelgood Entertainment (Greece); Pinema (Turkey); Monolith Films (Poland); Blitz (former Yugoslavia); Tokyo Theatres (Japan); MVP Entertainment (India, Hong Kong and Philippines); Hualien (Taiwan); Cineguru/Daou Technology (Korea); Golden Village Pictures (Singapore); Freeman Entertainment (Hungary and Romania); Falcon (Czech Republic); Myndform (Iceland); United King Films (Israel); Itafilm (Slovakia); DNA and Logo Motion Pictures (Thailand)
November 26, 2014	Horrible Bosses 2	co-production with RatPac Entertainment	Warner Bros. Pictures
December 17, 2014	The Hobbit: The Battle of the Five Armies	co-production with Metro-Goldwyn-Mayer and WingNut Films	Warner Bros. Pictures (Worldwide excluding international television and digital, Scandinavia, Portugal, Poland, Hungary, Bulgaria, Romania, Israel and the Middle East); MGM Television (International television and digital); SF Studios (Scandinavia); NOS Audiovisuais (Portugal); Forum Film (Poland, Hungary, Bulgaria, Romania and Israel); Gulf Film (Middle East)
May 8, 2015	Hot Pursuit	co-production with Metro-Goldwyn-Mayer and Pacific Standard	Warner Bros. Pictures (Worldwide excluding television and digital, Scandinavia, Portugal, Poland, Hungary, the Czech Republic, Slovakia, Bulgaria, Romania, Israel and the Middle East); MGM Television (Worldwide television and digital); SF Studios (Scandinavia); NOS Audiovisuais (Portugal); Forum Film (Poland, Hungary, the Czech Republic, Slovakia, Bulgaria, Romania and Israel); Gulf Film (Middle East)
May 29, 2015	San Andreas	co-production with Flynn Picture Company and Village Roadshow Pictures	Warner Bros. Pictures (Worldwide); Roadshow Entertainment (Australia and Singapore)
June 26, 2015	Batkid Begins	distribution only; produced by KTF Films	Warner Bros. Pictures
July 10, 2015	The Gallows	distribution only; produced by Blumhouse Productions, Management 360 and Tremendum Pictures	Warner Bros. Pictures
July 29, 2015	Vacation	co-production with Big Kid Pictures	Warner Bros. Pictures
August 14, 2015	Straight Outta Compton	associate credit only; produced by Legendary Pictures and Cube Vision. Nominated - Producers Guild of America Award for Best Theatrical Motion Picture	Universal Pictures
November 25, 2015	Creed	co-production with Metro-Goldwyn-Mayer and Chartoff-Winkler Productions	Warner Bros. Pictures (Worldwide excluding television and digital, Scandinavia, Portugal, Poland, Hungary, the Czech Republic, Slovakia, Bulgaria, Romania, Israel and the Middle East); MGM Television (Worldwide television and digital); SF Studios (Scandinavia); NOS Audiovisuais (Portugal); Forum Film (Poland, Hungary, the Czech Republic, Slovakia, Bulgaria, Romania and Israel); Gulf Film (Middle East)
February 12, 2016	How to Be Single	co-production with Metro-Goldwyn-Mayer, Flower Films and Wrigley Pictures	Warner Bros. Pictures
April 15, 2016	Barbershop: The Next Cut	co-production with Metro-Goldwyn-Mayer and Cube Vision	Warner Bros. Pictures (Worldwide excluding television and digital and Scandinavia); MGM Television (Worldwide television and digital); SF Studios (Scandinavia)
April 29, 2016	Keanu	co-production with The Sifi Company, Monkeypaw Productions and Principato-Young Entertainment	Warner Bros. Pictures
June 3, 2016	Me Before You	co-production with Metro-Goldwyn-Mayer and Sunswept Entertainment	Warner Bros. Pictures (Worldwide excluding international television and digital, Scandinavia, Portugal, Poland, Hungary, the Czech Republic, Slovakia, Bulgaria, Romania, Israel and the Middle East); MGM Television (International television and digital); SF Studios (Scandinavia); NOS Audiovisuais (Portugal); Forum Film (Poland, Hungary, the Czech Republic, Slovakia, Bulgaria, Romania and Israel); Gulf Film (Middle East)
June 10, 2016	The Conjuring 2	co-production with The Safran Company and Atomic Monster	Warner Bros. Pictures
June 17, 2016	Central Intelligence	co-production with RatPac Entertainment, Bluegrass Films, Perfect World Pictures and Principato-Young Entertainment	Warner Bros. Pictures (United States and Canada); Universal Pictures (International)
July 22, 2016	Lights Out	co-production with Atomic Monster and Grey Matter Productions	Warner Bros. Pictures
October 18, 2016	Within	co-production with The Safran Company	Warner Bros. Pictures
December 16, 2016	Collateral Beauty	co-production with Village Roadshow Pictures, Anonymous Content, Overbrook Entertainment, PalmStar Media and Likely Story	Warner Bros. Pictures (Worldwide); Roadshow Entertainment (Australia and Singapore)
February 17, 2017	Fist Fight	co-production with Village Roadshow Pictures, 21 Laps Entertainment and Rickard Pictures	Warner Bros. Pictures (Worldwide); Roadshow Entertainment (Australia and Singapore)
April 7, 2017	Going in Style	co-production with Village Roadshow Pictures and De Line Pictures	Warner Bros. Pictures (Worldwide); Roadshow Entertainment (Australia and Singapore)
April 18, 2017	Wolves at the Door	co-production with The Safran Company	Warner Bros. Pictures
June 28, 2017	The House	co-production with Village Roadshow Pictures, Good Universe and Gary Sanchez Productions	Warner Bros. Pictures (Worldwide); Roadshow Entertainment (Australia and Singapore)
August 9, 2017	Annabelle: Creation	co-production with Atomic Monster and The Safran Company	Warner Bros. Pictures
September 8, 2017	It	co-production with Lin Pictures, Vertigo Entertainment, KatzSmith Productions and RatPac Entertainment	Warner Bros. Pictures
December 8, 2017	The Disaster Artist	co-production with Point Grey Pictures, Good Universe and Rabbit Bandini Productions	A24 (United States and Canada); Elevation Pictures (Canada); Warner Bros. Pictures (International)
February 14, 2018	Game Night	co-production with Davis Entertainment and Aggregate Films	Warner Bros. Pictures
April 11, 2018	Rampage	co-production with Flynn Picture Company, Rickard Pictures and Seven Bucks Productions	Warner Bros. Pictures
May 9, 2018	Life of the Party	co-production with On the Day Productions	Warner Bros. Pictures
June 11, 2018	Tag	co-production with Broken Road Productions	Warner Bros. Pictures
September 3, 2018	The Nun	co-production with Atomic Monster and The Safran Company	Warner Bros. Pictures
November 21, 2018	Creed II	associate credit only; co-production with Metro-Goldwyn-Mayer and Chartoff-Winkler Productions	Warner Bros. Pictures (Worldwide excluding television and digital, Scandinavia, Portugal, Poland, Hungary, the Czech Republic, Slovakia, Bulgaria, Romania, Israel, the Middle East and China); MGM Television (Worldwide television and digital); SF Studios (Scandinavia); NOS Audiovisuais (Portugal); Forum Film (Poland, Hungary, the Czech Republic, Slovakia, Bulgaria, Romania and Israel); Gulf Film (Middle East); JL Vision Film (China)
February 13, 2019	Isn't It Romantic	co-production with Bron Studios and Creative Wealth Media Finance	Warner Bros. Pictures (United States and Canada); Netflix (International)
April 3, 2019	Shazam!	co-production with DC Films, Seven Bucks Productions and The Safran Company	Warner Bros. Pictures
April 15, 2019	The Curse of La Llorona	co-production with Atomic Monster	Warner Bros. Pictures
June 10, 2019	Shaft	co-production with Davis Entertainment	Warner Bros. Pictures (United States and Canada); Netflix (International)
June 26, 2019	Annabelle Comes Home	co-production with Atomic Monster and The Safran Company	Warner Bros. Pictures
August 7, 2019	The Kitchen	co-production with Bron Studios, Creative Wealth Media Finance and DC Vertigo	Warner Bros. Pictures
August 14, 2019	Blinded by the Light	distribution outside the U.K., Ireland, Australia, New Zealand, France, Scandinavia, South Africa and Japan only; produced by Bend It Films, Ingenious Media and Levantine Films	Warner Bros. Pictures
September 2, 2019	It Chapter Two	co-production with Rideback and Vertigo Entertainment	Warner Bros. Pictures
November 11, 2019	The Good Liar	co-production with Bron Studios and Creative Wealth Media Finance	Warner Bros. Pictures

== 2020s ==
Release date	Title	Notes	Distributor(s)
March 26, 2021	Superintelligence ‡	co-production with On the Day Productions and Bron Creative	Warner Bros. Pictures
April 23, 2021	Mortal Kombat	co-production with Atomic Monster and Broken Road Productions (Note: Released theatrically and on HBO Max on the same day.)	Warner Bros. Pictures
May 14, 2021	Those Who Wish Me Dead	co-production with Bron Studios, Film Rites and Creative Wealth Media	Warner Bros. Pictures
June 4, 2021	The Conjuring: The Devil Made Me Do It	co-production with Atomic Monster and The Safran Company	Warner Bros. Pictures
September 10, 2021	Malignant	co-production with Atomic Monster, Starlight Media and Midas Innovation	Warner Bros. Pictures
October 1, 2021	The Many Saints of Newark	co-production with HBO Films	Warner Bros. Pictures
November 26, 2021	8-Bit Christmas ‡	co-production with Star Thrower Entertainment	Warner Bros. Pictures
January 27, 2022	The Fallout ‡	distribution only; produced by Clear Horizon, SSS Entertainment, The Burstein Company, 828 Media Capital and Clear Media Finance	Warner Bros. Pictures
February 10, 2022	Kimi ‡		Warner Bros. Pictures
March 31, 2022	Moonshot ‡	co-production with Berlanti/Schechter Films and Entertainment 360	Warner Bros. Pictures
September 23, 2022	Don't Worry Darling	co-production with Vertigo Entertainment	Warner Bros. Pictures
October 21, 2022	Black Adam	co-production with DC Films, Seven Bucks Productions and FlynnPictureCo.	Warner Bros. Pictures
January 13, 2023	House Party	co-production with SpringHill Entertainment	Warner Bros. Pictures
March 17, 2023	Shazam! Fury of the Gods	co-production with DC Films and The Safran Company	Warner Bros. Pictures
April 21, 2023	Evil Dead Rise	co-production with Ghost House Pictures	Warner Bros. Pictures (Worldwide); StudioCanal (United Kingdom); Metropolitan Filmexport (France)
September 8, 2023	The Nun II	co-production with Atomic Monster and The Safran Company	Warner Bros. Pictures
May 2, 2024	Turtles All the Way Down ‡	co-production with Temple Hill Entertainment	Warner Bros. Pictures
June 7, 2024	The Watchers	distribution only; produced by Blinding Edge Pictures and Inimitable Pictures	Warner Bros. Pictures
June 28, 2024	Horizon: An American Saga – Chapter 1	North American, U.K., Irish, Spanish, Italian and Dutch distribution only; produced by Territory Pictures	Warner Bros. Pictures
October 3, 2024	'Salem's Lot ‡	co-production with Atomic Monster, Vertigo Entertainment and Wolper Organization	Warner Bros. Pictures
October 10, 2024	Caddo Lake ‡	co-production with Blinding Edge Pictures and K Period Media	Warner Bros. Pictures
November 28, 2024	Sweethearts ‡	co-production with Picturestart	Warner Bros. Pictures
December 13, 2024	The Lord of the Rings: The War of the Rohirrim	co-production with Warner Bros. Animation, WingNut Films and Sola Entertainment	Warner Bros. Pictures
January 31, 2025	Companion	co-production with BoulderLight Pictures	Warner Bros. Pictures
March 13, 2025	The Parenting ‡	co-production with Good Fear Content	Warner Bros. Pictures
May 16, 2025	Final Destination Bloodlines	co-production with Practical Pictures, Freshman Year, and Fireside Films	Warner Bros. Pictures
August 8, 2025	Weapons	co-production with Subconscious, Vertigo Entertainment and BoulderLight Pictures	Warner Bros. Pictures
September 5, 2025	The Conjuring: Last Rites	co-production with Atomic Monster and The Safran Company	Warner Bros. Pictures
March 27, 2026	They Will Kill You	co-production with Nocturna	Warner Bros. Pictures
April 17, 2026	Lee Cronin's The Mummy	co-production with Atomic Monster, Blumhouse Productions and Wicked/Good	Warner Bros. Pictures
May 8, 2026	Mortal Kombat II	co-production with Atomic Monster, Broken Road Productions and Fireside Films	Warner Bros. Pictures
July 10, 2026	Evil Dead Burn	co-production with Screen Gems and Ghost House Pictures	Warner Bros. Pictures (United States and Canada); StudioCanal (United Kingdom); Metropolitan Filmexport (France); Volga (Russia); Sony Pictures Releasing International (International)

== Upcoming films ==
Release date	Title	Notes	Production status
February 26, 2027	The Revenge of La Llorona	co-production with Blumhouse Atomic, Coin Operated and Latchkey Productions	Post-production
September 10, 2027	The Conjuring: First Communion	co-production with The Safran Company	Post-production
December 17, 2027	The Lord of the Rings: The Hunt for Gollum	co-production with WingNut Films	Filming
April 7, 2028	Evil Dead Wrath	co-production with Screen Gems and Ghost House Pictures	Post-production
May 12, 2028	Final Destination 7	co-production with Practical Pictures, Freshman Year and Fireside Films	Pre-production
July 21, 2028	Untitled Hello Kitty film	co-production with Warner Bros. Pictures Animation, Sanrio and FlynnPictureCo.	Pre-production
August 11, 2028	The Flood	co-production with Amblin Entertainment and Vertigo Entertainment	Pre-production
September 8, 2028	Gladys	co-production with Vertigo Entertainment	Pre-production

=== Undated films ===
Release date	Title	Notes	Production status
Late 2026	The Spiral	distribution in North America, Hong Kong, Taiwan, the Philippines, Thailand, Indonesia, Malaysia and Vietnam only; produced by Rai Cinema, Propaganda and Dinamo Film	Completed
2027	Horizon: An American Saga – Chapter 2	U.S. distribution only; produced by Territory Pictures; international distribution handled by K5 International	Completed
TBA	BAM Bus	co-production with Panoramic Media	In development
TBA	Cut Outs	co-production with BoulderLight Pictures	In development
TBA	Horizon: An American Saga – Chapter 3	produced by Territory Pictures	Filming
TBA	Jealous People Are Ugly People	co-production with The Fold and Temple Hill Entertainment	In development
TBA	Last Friday	co-production with Cube Vision	In development
TBA	Lights Out 2	co-production with Atomic Monster	In development
TBA	Mortal Kombat III	co-production with Atomic Monster, Broken Road Productions, and Fireside Films	In development
TBA	Rush Hour 4	co-production with Eagle Pictures; distributed by Paramount Pictures	In development
TBA	Single at the Wedding	co-production with Something Something Pictures	In development
TBA	Space Invaders	co-production with Safehouse Pictures and Weed Road Pictures	In development
TBA	Undo	co-production with FlynnPictureCo	In development
TBA	Untitled Amityville film	co-production with BoulderLight Pictures and Divide/Conquer	Pre-production
TBA	Untitled Chris Farley biopic	co-production with Broadway Video	Pre-production
TBA	Untitled female-driven ensemble comedy	co-production with Delirious Media	In development
TBA	Untitled A Nightmare on Elm Street film	international distribution only; co-production with Paramount Primal	In development
TBA	The Wizard of Oz	co-production with The Hideaway Entertainment and Temple Hill Entertainment	In development

== Direct-to-video films ==
Release date	Title	Notes
December 11, 1991	Critters 3	
October 14, 1992	Critters 4	
January 8, 1995	Silent Hunter	
August 29, 1995	Excessive Force II: Force on Force	
January 16, 1996	Poison Ivy II: Lily	
July 2, 1996	Theodore Rex	
April 30, 1997	Campfire Tales (Note: U.S. distribution rights currently owned by Samuel Goldwyn Films)	
May 20, 1997	Poison Ivy: The New Seduction	
June 21, 1997	Living in Peril	
October 14, 1997	Raven	
April 7, 1998	Overnight Delivery	
September 17, 2003	Run Ronnie Run!	
November 29, 2005	Havoc	
October 9, 2006	The Butterfly Effect 2	
June 25, 2007	Uncle P (Note: Owned by Beacon Pictures, with distribution rights currently licensed to Resurgence Media Group, which has sub-licensed U.S. rights to Shout! Studios)	North American distribution only; co-production with Beacon Pictures
June 16, 2009	The Cell 2	

== Television series ==
This table does not include shows produced by New Line Television, which was a television production subsidiary of New Line Cinema active from 1988 to 2008.

Year	Title	Original network	Notes
2014	Elf: Buddy's Musical Christmas	NBC	co-production with Warner Bros. Animation
2016	Rush Hour	CBS	co-production with Doozer, RatPac Television and Warner Bros. Television
2016	Hairspray Live!	NBC	Television special; co-production with Warner Bros. Television, Storyline Entertainment, Sony Pictures Television and Universal Television
2016–2017	Frequency	The CW	co-production with Warner Bros. Television, Lin Pictures and Jeremy Carver Productions
2019	Critters: A New Binge	Shudder	co-production with Triton Media and Blue Ribbon Content
2019–2022	His Dark Materials	BBC One/HBO	co-production with Bad Wolf
2022	The Time Traveller's Wife	HBO	co-production with Hartswood Films and Warner Bros. Television
2022–present	The Lord of the Rings: The Rings of Power	Amazon Prime Video	co-production with Amazon MGM Studios

== Notes ==
Release notes

Film rights notes
