= Ahmad Golchin =

Iranian-born film distributor based in Dubai

Ahmad Golchin (born 1942) is an Iranian-born film distributor and cinema executive based in Dubai, United Arab Emirates. He founded Phars Film in 1964 and co-founded Gulf Film in 1989. A University of St Andrews study described him as one of the early distributors of foreign films in the Gulf region. UAE newspapers and film-industry figures have described him as a founding figure in the country's cinema industry.

== Early life ==
Golchin was born in Iran in 1942. He told the Khaleej Times that he sold books as a child to help support his mother and later became a publisher, producing approximately 140 books. He left Iran and arrived in Dubai around 1964. Published accounts differ by one year: a 2008 Gulf News profile reported 1963, while later profiles reported 1964.

According to the Khaleej Times, Golchin travelled from Iran by boat carrying a Persian-dubbed print of the Mexican film Fight to Death. During his first years in Dubai he made shop signs and became involved in screenings at the open-air cinemas around Nasr Square. Films shown in Dubai at the time came principally from India, Iran and other parts of the Middle East. Because conventional advertising was limited, Golchin promoted screenings using banners on abras and people carrying placards through local markets.

== Film distribution and exhibition ==
Golchin established Phars Film in Dubai in 1964. The company became involved in importing and distributing Indian and other foreign-language films in the Gulf. Film scholar Abdulrahman Alghannam wrote that Phars Film and Gulf Film became major distributors of Bollywood and other Indian films in the region from the 1980s onward.

In 1989, Golchin and Salim Ramia co-founded Gulf Film, initially specialising in the regional distribution of Hollywood films. The business expanded into cinema exhibition in the early 1990s and operated theatres under the Grand Cinemas name. By 2000, Grand Cinemas was developing multiplex sites in the UAE.

Gulf Film and Grand Cinemas were acquired by Qatar Media Services in 2012, after which Golchin focused on Phars Film's distribution and production operations. In 2013, Screen Daily reported that Phars Film, run by Golchin and his daughter Mahi Golchin-Depala, distributed about 350 titles annually from India, Iran, the Philippines, Europe and the American independent-film sector.

Golchin also held an ownership interest in Star Cinemas. Alghannam's study identified the chain as having been established in 2007 and operating across six emirates, and noted Golchin's cinema joint ventures in Bahrain and Qatar.

== Recognition ==
Golchin has been described by Gulf News as the "father" and "Godfather" of UAE cinemas, while the Khaleej Times reported that people in the industry regarded him as a founding father of the UAE cinema business.

In February 2023, the fifth Al Ain Film Festival honoured Golchin through its "Artists' Achievements" programme. Coverage of the event described him as one of the founders of cinema in the UAE and among the earliest film distributors in the Gulf region.
