= Brandon French =

Actress and author

Brandon French (born 20th century as Michaux French) is a former actress turned author and psychoanalyst.

She first came to prominence in 1969 as the co-star and co-writer of the loosely autobiographical drama film Brandy in the Wilderness (1971), directed by Stanton Kaye, under her birth name of Michaux French.

She later went on to write the book On the Verge of Revolt: Women in American Films of the Fifties, first published by Frederick Ungar Publishing Company in 1978.

Her stories and essays have been published in journals such as Calliope and The Nassau Review, as well as in Ms. magazine.

== See also ==
- Lists of writers
