= Brandy in the Wilderness =

1971 film

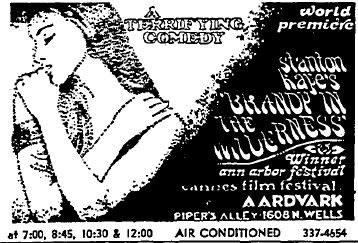
- Newspaper advertisement
- Directed by: Stanton Kaye
- Written by: Michaux French; Stanton Kaye
- Starring: Stanton Kaye
- Cinematography: Stanton Kaye
- Edited by: Stanton Kaye; Susan Pottish; Masako Takahashi
- Distributed by: New Line Cinema
- Release date: March 11, 1971
- Running time: 87 minutes
- Country: United States
- Language: English

Brandy in the Wilderness is a 1971 American drama film directed by Stanton Kaye. On December 18, 2013, the Library of Congress selected the film for preservation in the National Film Registry, for being "culturally, historically, or aesthetically significant".

The film is a partly fictionalized account of the real-life professional and intimate relationship that developed between prodigious filmmaker Kaye and aspiring artist Michaux French, which began when they met in 1965. Kaye's character is named "Simon Weiss" and French is named "Brandy," while their actual parents and other friends and acquaintances appear in the film, uncredited and often unnamed. Most of the scenes are depicted with either voiceover or without sound; only a limited number of moments feature live dialogue being delivered by the participants. These are occasional interjections of stock footage from major film productions, still photos of family members and well-known performers, and moments of blank screen featuring hand-dyed colors (which Kaye chose and supervised himself).

== Plot ==
Kaye as Weiss opens the film with a rundown of his history in the film business, describing or depicting important events, people, and locations he deems pertinent. Some scenes and stories are factual, such as Kaye's father's departure from acting work to sell women's clothes at farmers' markets, while others are fictionalized, such as moments purportedly depicting his early student film work. He recounts at length his initial meeting with Brandy when both were living in New York, their initial decision to collaborate on a project, an extended road trip the two of them engage in and simultaneously film, and the breakdown of their relationship soon afterward. Weiss essentially concludes his story by saying that in order to complete the project, he has agreed to cohabit with Brandy, since she has taken possession of the film elements.

At this point, Brandy takes over narration, providing her own similar personal background history, and more importantly, her version of the relationship with Weiss. In her telling of the events previously described by Weiss, the audience is shown many moments of volatility between them, and Weiss' often cruel treatment of her, particularly after she becomes pregnant with his child. At the end of the film, Weiss and Brandy are seen with their newborn daughter and pets in a moment of uneasy but otherwise calm tranquility, and the film ends with Brandy describing that, around the time of her father's funeral, her daughter was first able to stand under her own power, as the final frame depicts the infant standing upright.

== Production ==
Parts of the film were shot in Kanab and the Moqui Cave in Utah.

== Release ==
Brandy in the Wilderness was completed and released in 1969. It received an award from the 1969 Ann Arbor Film Festival, and was picked up for U.S. distribution by the then-fledgling New Line Cinema, whose president, Robert Shaye, was present for the Ann Arbor screening.

One of its earliest champions was Paul Schrader, who at the time was writing film criticism before later becoming a writer/director himself. He wrote of the film, "I saw Brandy shortly after it was completed, liked it rather well, but thought it was limited in scope and would age quite poorly. It was I, not Brandy, however, that was limited in scope...I saw Brandy again and it was still growing; it had qualities I had never appreciated before. It is always painful for a critic to realize that that flash in the pan he saw several years ago was gold." Schrader would continue to champion the film as recently as 2006, when he arranged for it to be screened at the L'Etrange Festival in Paris.

After the release of Brandy in the Wilderness, French ultimately took the professional name of Brandon French for further work in film and literature. Under this name, she would collaborate again with Kaye on his follow-up project In Pursuit of Treasure, which was financed, and ultimately shelved, by the American Film Institute.

== Cast ==
- Stanton Kaye as Simon Weiss
- Michaux French as Brandy
- Allan McCollum as himself
