= Gulf Film =

Film distributor

Gulf Film LLC
- Type: Private company
- Founded: 1989
- Headquarters: Dubai, United Arab Emirates
- Key people: Jaber Al Ansari, Group CEO, Elan Group
- Website: gulffilm.com

Gulf Film is a film distributor which was established in 1989. It is focused on film distribution for major studios from around the world as well as independent English and Arabic films catering to audiences across the Middle East. Gulf Film is the distribution rights owner of more than 150 titles – that's almost half of the films distributed in the region. Gulf Film is by far the largest film distributor in the Middle East.

Gulf Film took a step forward in the year 2000 and expanded its portfolio by creating Grand Cinemas. Later on, in 2014 the chain of cinema was rebranded and re-inaugurated to become Novo Cinemas. Currently Novo Cinemas is the largest chain of theatres in the Middle East.

In January Gulf Films released Fox's Taken 3, which pulled in $10.3 million — the region's ninth largest box office intake ever – after star Liam Neeson attended the Middle East's first Hollywood-style fan premiere in Dubai.

Gulf Film is headquartered in Dubai, United Arab Emirates.

== History ==
The Grand Cinemas brand name was launched in Dubai, United Arab Emirates, in 2000. It was relaunched on May 6, 2014, as Novo Cinemas.

In July 2005, Grand Cinemas launched the first IMAX in the Middle East at Ibn Battuta Mall Megaplex in Dubai.

== Services ==
- THE LINK
- PRODDIGI
- AGENCIES

== Films distributed in the Middle East ==
- Slumdog Millionaire
- Terminator Salvation
- Tinker Tailor Soldier Spy
- The Whistleblower
- Drive
- Immortals
- Hope Springs
- The Awakening
- Skyfall
- The Hobbit: An Unexpected Journey
- Deadfall
- The Hobbit: The Desolation of Smaug
- Mandela: Long Walk to Freedom
- Fury
- Spectre
- The Last King
- 99 Homes
- The Prophet
- Snowpiercer
- The Love Punch
- Taken 3
- Foosball
- Son of a Gun
- Walking on Sunshine
- Big Game
- Tiger House
- The Call Up
- Paddington
- Miss Sloane
- Overdrive
- Florence Foster Jenkins
- Bad Moms
- Jackie
- Valerian and the City of a Thousand Planets
- The Edge of Seventeen
- Paddington 2
- Loving
- Viceroy's House
- A United Kingdom
- 47 Meters Down
- Adrift
- A Bad Moms Christmas
- All the Money in the World
- Whitney
- Mile 22
- Dead in a Week or Your Money Back
- 47 Meters Down
- Ghost Stories
- Den of Thieves
- Hot Dog
- Second Act
- Gringo
- Vice
- El Chicano
- Diego Maradona
- Booksmart
- Fighting with My Family
- Alone/Together
- UglyDolls
- Child's Play
- Where'd You Go, Bernadette
- The Addams Family
- Countdown
- The Hustle
- Hustlers
- Our Friend
- Red Shoes and the Seven Dwarfs
- Candyman
- Respect
- The Addams Family 2
- My Fairy Troublemaker
- No Time to Die
- House of Gucci
- The Black Demon
- Last Sentinel
- Memory
- Fatherland
- Rose
- All of a Sudden

== See also ==
- The Movie Masters Cinema Group, Grand Cinemas is also a cinema chain, operating under parent company Movie Masters, in Western Australia. Movie Masters also operates Ace Cinemas.
