= Music of the Dead Space series =

The music of the Dead Space media franchise, created by Visceral Games (originally EA Redwood Shores) and published by Electronic Arts around a series of survival horror video games, was mainly composed by Jason Graves. Graves composed the music for all mainline entries in the series and the majority of spin-off titles. Other composers have been involved in the series; Grave's recurring collaborator Rod Abernethy acted as an early advisor for the titular first game, James Hannigan co-composed the score for Dead Space 3, while the 2023 remake of the first game combined some elements of the original music with a whole new score by Trevor Gureckis. Scores for the movies Dead Space: Downfall and Dead Space: Aftermath were respectively composed were Seth Podowitz and Christopher Tin.

The original Dead Space was scored to sound unconventional by standards of the time, drawing inspiration from the work of Christopher Young and the score of The Shining. For Dead Space 2, Graves expanded the orchestral elements, and incorporated a string quartet to represent protagonist Isaac Clarke. For Dead Space 3, Graves maintained his style while incorporating action themes, while Hannigan composed music to advance its narrative and be distinct from Graves's tracks. Each mainline entry, including the remake, has received digital soundtrack album releases. Reception of the music has been generally positive, with Graves being nominated for multiple awards for his work on Dead Space and Dead Space 2.

== Overview ==
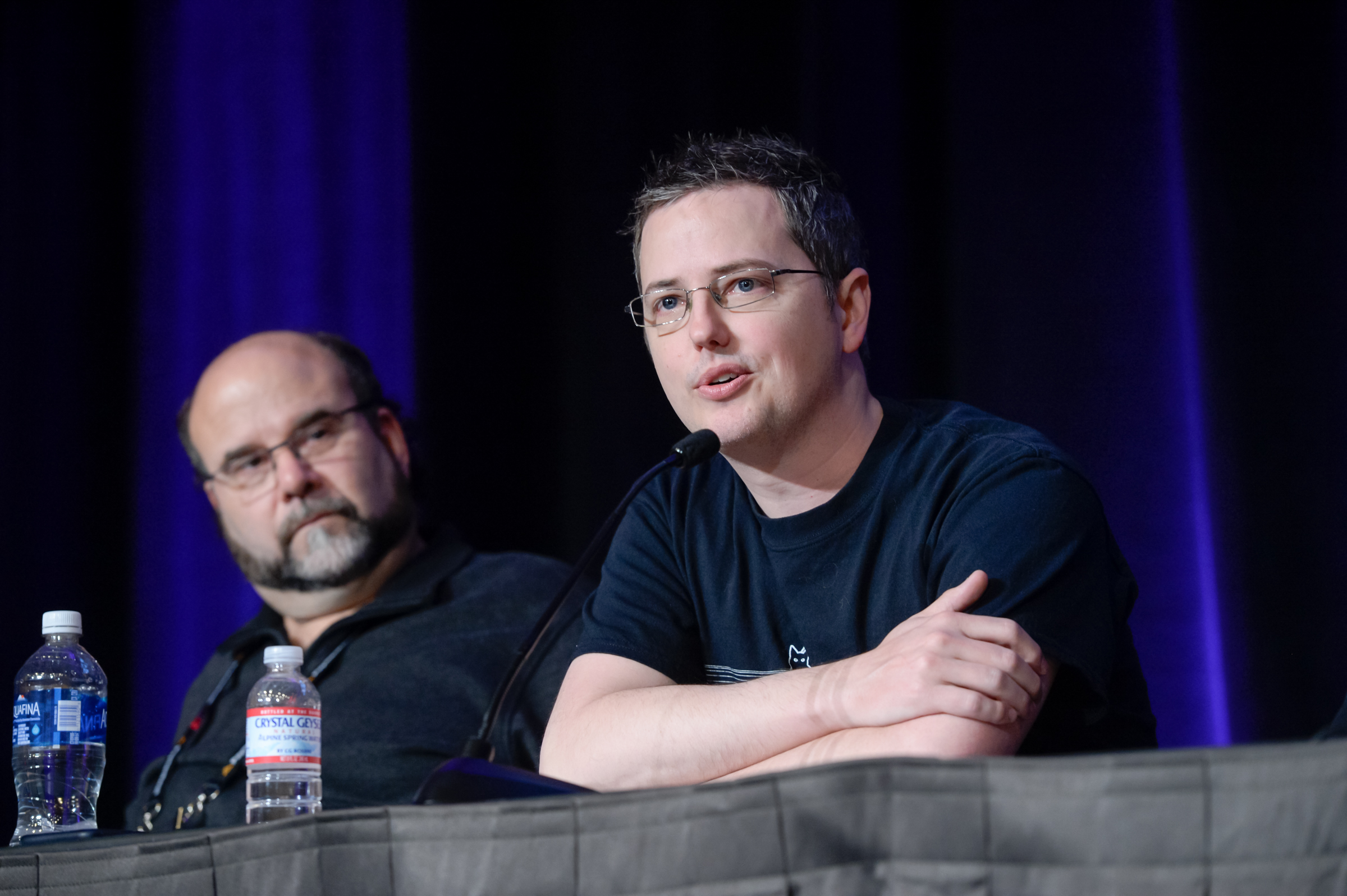
Composer Jason Graves (pictured in 2016) worked on the majority of the Dead Space franchise.

The Dead Space series was produced by Visceral Games (originally EA Redwood Shores). The titular first game, released in 2008, began production two years before. The concept was based on series creator Glen Schofield's wish to create the most frightening horror game possible. It was supported by a wider multimedia narrative, originally referred to as "IP cubed" and later as a "trans-media franchise". Following the original's success, multiple spin-off titles followed. The next two mainline entries were Dead Space 2 (2011), and Dead Space 3 (2013). While a fourth game was planned, the commercial failure of Dead Space 3 and the closure of Visceral Games caused the series to go dormant.

The music for the Dead Space series was primarily composed by Jason Graves. He had a background in classical music and composition for film and television before debuting in video games. Graves would go on to work on the next two mainline Dead Space entries, and all the spin-off titles (Dead Space: Extraction, Dead Space Ignition, Dead Space Mobile). His work on Dead Space 3 was in collaboration with James Hannigan. The music for the animated direct-to-video spin-off Dead Space: Downfall was composed by Seth Podowitz. For the later movie Dead Space: Aftermath, the score was composed by Christopher Tin, who was told to emulate Grave's musical style. A remake of the first game was released in 2023 from Motive Studios. For the remake, additional music was created by Trevor Gureckis, a film composer known for several collaborations with M. Night Shyamalan.

== Albums ==
=== Dead Space Original Soundtrack (2008) ===
Dead Space Original Soundtrack

Soundtrack album to Dead Space by Jason Graves
- Released: November 11, 2008
- Recorded: Bastyr Chapel, Seattle; Skywalker Sound, Redwood Shores, California
- Genre: Video game music
- Length: 61:07
- Label: Electronic Arts
- Producers: Jason Graves, Rod Abernethy

Graves joined the project early in production, when the game was a quarter of the way through development. During their requests for composers, the team cited the work of Christopher Young as a reference for applicants. After joining the project, Graves took further inspiration from the score for The Shining. Using the available guidelines, Graves put together a sample demo, which both got him the job and greatly impressed sound designer Don Veca. A sample from the demo plays during the game's credits. The developers wanted music that was dark and "Aleatoric in style", ranging from eerie sounds to loud cacophonous sections. As part of his work, Graves was regularly sent footage of level playthroughs as reference material. While the game credits both Graves and recurring collaborator Rod Abernethy as composers, all music was composed by Graves alone.

The first samples used heroic tones negatively compared to a "Will Smith sci-fi movie", prompting requests for a more frightening score. One of the key challenges for the score was creating a musical and sound experience equivalent to linear horror movies within a non-linear game environment. Rather than character themes and bombastic pieces, the score is based on moody ambience aside from boss encounters or scripted chase sequences. To create the horror-styled environment, Graves visualized the situation through the eyes of protagonist Isaac Clarke, then used modern contemporary instruments to make the score "as non-musical as possible". The sample-based style is a musical rendition of the name of the enemy Necromorphs, with "Necro" meaning "death" and "morph" meaning "to change". An exception to this approach is the theme of supporting character Nicole Brennan, which followed Graves's more conventional musical tastes with traditional chord progressions.

The score uses a live orchestra; each section is recorded separately, then arranged into four musical layers and adjusted in-game based on the situation. Many of the ambient elements as produced by string or brass sections being allowed to each play any note they wanted, with the resultant sounds mixed into the environment. The score elements were performed first by the Northwest Sinfonia at the Bastyr University Chapel. At one point, Graves worried that half their recording budget would be spent on elements that could be scrapped as unworkable. The final in-game score for Dead Space is three hours long and was recorded over five months, several times more than Graves had composed for previous video game titles. Graves described it as the most challenging and enjoyable composing job he had undertaken for a game, praising the amount of freedom he was given by the sound team. A notable musical inclusion in trailers was the lullaby "Twinkle, Twinkle, Little Star".

An official digital soundtrack album, Dead Space Original Soundtrack, was announced in October, shortly before the game's release. Originally slated for release alongside the console version of Dead Space on October 14, it was eventually released by Electronic Arts on November 1 through its own music label, then on other storefronts in November 11. Video Game Music Online's Simon Elchlepp cited the music as unlike anything that had been heard in video games before, but felt that the constant tension became wearing after prolonged listening, and felt that Grave's style was better realised in Dead Space 2. Robert Halvarsson, writing for Original Sound Version, praised the ambience and constant tension invoked by the score, but noted a lack of subtlety in later combat-oriented tracks. Rick Damigella of G4 praised the soundtrack's overall quality and called it "truly original", saying it had encouraged him to try out the game despite his dislike of the survival horror genre. Both Halvarsson and Damigella positively noted the naming puns for several tracks. At the 2009 British Academy Games Awards, Graves and Dead Space won in the "Original Score" and "Use of Audio" categories. The game also won in the "Audio of the Year" category at that year's Game Audio Network Guild Awards. The track "Welcome Aboard the U.S.G. Ishimura" was later included on the Amazon release of The Greatest Video Game Music, a compilation album of video game music.

Track list
No.	Title	Length
1.	"Dead Space Theme"	3:35
2.	"Welcome Aboard the U.S.G. Ishimura"	5:21
3.	"The Necromorphs Attack"	5:51
4.	"Fly Me to the Aegis Seven Moon"	4:55
5.	"Severed Limbs Are Hazardous Waste"	4:56
6.	"Nicole's Farewell"	2:51
7.	"I Left My Heart in Med Lab 3"	2:19
8.	"The Leviathan"	3:18
9.	"Cyanide Systems Offline"	3:17
10.	"Entering Zero-G"	2:01
11.	"I've Got You Devolving Under My Skin"	3:10
12.	"Manual Survival Mode Seven"	4:56
13.	"Plasma Cutters Are Your Friend"	3:14
14.	"The Cost of Living Is on the Rise"	4:05
15.	"Do Not Vomit - Do Not Shout"	2:43
16.	"The Hive Mind"	2:37
17.	"Escape from the Planet of the Red Marker"	1:58
Total length:		61:07

=== Dead Space 2 Original Videogame Score ===
Dead Space 2 Original Videogame Score

Soundtrack album to Dead Space 2 by Jason Graves
- Released: January 25, 2011
- Recorded: Skywalker Sound, Redwood Shores, California
- Genre: Video game music
- Length: 60:22; 60:15 (Collector's Edition)
- Label: Electronic Arts
- Producers: Jason Graves, Andrew Boyd

Graves returned and worked on and off on the game for eighteen months, with his work expanding on the work he had done on the earlier game with modifications to accommodate the greater focus on action. Compared to the first game, where he had a specific direction, Graves had a lot of creative freedom for the score. Graves drew inspiration from classical music from the first half of the 20th century, citing Krzysztof Penderecki's Threnody to the Victims of Hiroshima as a point of comparison for the string focus in Dead Space 2. As with the first game, the soundtrack was performed and recorded at Skywalker Sound. Each section of the orchestra, whether woodwinds or strings, had their own recording sessions and created samples that Graves later mixed together for each track.

The main theme "Lacrimosa" was born from there being the time to create a concerto using a string quartet. Speaking about its tone compared to the rest of the score, Graves admitted that he liked playing against genre expectations, while also giving Béla Bartók and Igor Stravinsky as possible inspirations for its instrumentation. Isaac's leitmotif uses the note order D-flat, E, A-flat, and D-natural. Spelling the word 'DEAD', the motif appears throughout the score. The Marker's theme was described by Graves as intruding in on Isaac's theme trying to "break it down", a conflict he brought out in "Lacrimosa". Like Isaac's theme it was a set of four notes, descending in half-cords. He also brought back Nicole's theme as a motif spread through the score. A further recurring motif was a single note "bending up and down" within the string quartet pieces, representing Isaac's dementia. The opening theme "Welcome to The Sprawl" was almost entirely used for a pre-rendered cutscene, allowing Graves to introduce all the game's themes within it. Dead Space 2 contains over three hours of layered music.

An official soundtrack album, Dead Space 2 Original Videogame Score, was digitally released on January 25, 2011 by Electronic Arts. A physical soundtrack release was included in the Collector's Edition of Dead Space 2. Graves spent around three weeks producing the albums. Due to the large amount of music in-game, his biggest challenge was selecting which pieces and arrangements to pick for commercial release. For the Collector's Edition, the soundtrack's sole physical release, he included thirty minutes of exclusive music. At a launch event called "Dead Space Exposed", Graves conducted an eleven-minute version of "Lacrimosa", performed by the Philharmonia Orchestra. Elchlepp called the score "a mesmerising creation", and praised the selection of album tracks as a superior listening experience compared to the first game's soundtrack album. Gideon Dabi of Original Sound Version compared the accomplishments of the music to sequels that surpass their originals mechanically, praising its tone and dramatic elements. Both reviews praised "Lacrimosa". At the 2012 Game Developers Choice Awards, the title was nominated for in the "Best Audio" category. At that year's Game Audio Network Guild Awards, it was nominated in the "Audio of the Year" and "Best Interactive Score", and "Best Original Soundtrack Album" categories.

Track List (Album)
No.	Title	Length
1.	"Welcome to The Sprawl"	5:20
2.	"Much Ado About Necromorphs"	4:36
3.	"Nice R.I.G. If You Can Get It"	2:20
4.	"Canonical Aside"	2:01
5.	"Rest in Pieces"	2:46
6.	"The Cassini Towers"	3:58
7.	"It Had to Be Unitology"	5:16
8.	"Say Hello to My Little Friends"	5:02
9.	"Awesome Hulk"	4:14
10.	"You Got Nill"	4:13
11.	"I Only Have Eyes for You"	5:00
12.	"You Go to My Head"	4:14
13.	"Come Rain or Come Convergence"	3:46
14.	"Lacrimosa"	7:36
Total length:		60:22

Track list (Collector's Edition)
No.	Title	Length
1.	"Isaac, Are You There?"	5:16
2.	"Padded Room With a View"	3:11
3.	"Hospital Escape"	2:20
4.	"The Cassini Towers"	3:58
5.	"Fear of Flying"	4:03
6.	"It Had to Be Unitology"	5:16
7.	"Isaac Get Your Gun"	1:48
8.	"Titan Station Elementary"	3:44
9.	"Class Dismissed"	2:40
10.	"East of the Sun and West of the Solar Array"	2:09
11.	"Administering Control"	2:46
12.	"Start Spreading the Limbs"	2:31
13.	"You Go to My Head"	1:15
14.	"The Government Sector"	2:41
15.	"Canonical Aside"	1:56
16.	"War and Pieces"	2:45
17.	"Convergence Delayed"	3:46
18.	"Lacrimosa"	8:10
Total length:		60:15

=== Dead Space 3 Original Video Game Score ===
Dead Space 3 Original Video Game Score

Soundtrack album to Dead Space 3 by Jason Graves & James Hannigan
- Released: February 12, 2013
- Recorded: Abbey Road Studios, London; Slovak Radio Concert Hall, Bratislava
- Genre: Video game music
- Length: 1:23:29
- Label: Electronic Arts

For the soundtrack of Dead Space 3, Graves collaborated with Hannigan. Reflecting the title's gameplay change, the music shifts its tone towards action over the earlier focus on horror. While there was a greater focus on action, Graves wanted to maintain musical links to the earlier games, blending the series' established horror-based sound with "some modern, edgier appointments". For the long space sections, while otherwise realistic in their muting of sounds beyond the range of Isaac's suit, use musical cues to emphasise the action.

Hannigan was brought in around the middle of 2012 after being requested to provide test music by Electronic Arts. Hannigan described his contribution to the score as focusing on moving the narrative along rather than creating atmosphere. Speaking about the change from urban to natural environments with the Tau Volantis location, Hannigan compared the contrasting tones with how music was used to humanise alien locations by John Williams for the Star Wars film series. Knowing Grave's style for the series, Hannigan chose to mostly stay away from it.

The soundtrack was performed by the Philharmonia Orchestra at Abbey Road Studios, and the Slovak National Symphony Orchestra at the Slovak Radio Concert Hall in Bratislava. Graves and Hannigan mostly worked on different areas of the music or focused on specific chapters, though there were sections where both of their compositions featured. Hannigan described the score as a whole as being "a little more high-tech" than earlier entries. The score featured vocals from singer Miriam Stockley. The ending credits used the track "Ephemeral" by post-metal band Pelican. The live-action launch trailer used a remixed version of the Phil Collins single "In the Air Tonight".

An official soundtrack album for the game titled Dead Space 3 Original Video Game Score, featuring selected tracks by Graves and Hannigan, was released by Electronic Arts on February 12, 2013. The official album featured tracks from both composers, chosen to contrast against one-another. Elchlepp found the official album a disappointment due to the clashing tones of Grave's and Hannigan's work, also noting that the more atmospheric tracks made similar mistakes to the ambient focus of the original game; he summed up the changed as "a disappointing downgrade". He ranked Grave's self-published digital album release as being better musically, but still less impressive than earlier soundtrack releases. Jen Bosier of Forbes was more positive, saying series fans would enjoy the album despite the shift in tone, saying that "Hannigan's and Graves' style and tone combine for a wonderful, cohesive listening experience."

Track list
No.	Title	Writer(s)	Length
1.	"200 Years Ago, On an Icy Planet..."	James Hannigan	7:20
2.	"The Quick and the Dead"	Jason Graves	6:03
3.	"A Broken Past"	James Hannigan	4:54
4.	"Lunar Express"	James Hannigan	4:35
5.	"60 Seconds Over Tau Volantis"	Jason Graves	1:59
6.	"The Fiery Room"	Jason Graves	2:32
7.	"Spaced Out and Frantic"	Jason Graves	2:30
8.	"Vomit Comet"	Jason Graves	2:12
9.	"Graffiti Speaks"	James Hannigan	1:30
10.	"Knee Deep"	Jason Graves	5:30
11.	"Buckell Down"	James Hannigan	2:13
12.	"Apoplexia"	Jason Graves	4:04
13.	"In Tents"	Jason Graves	4:23
14.	"Into the Stomach"	Jason Graves	6:33
15.	"The Nexus"	Jason Graves	2:37
16.	"Mountains of Madness"	James Hannigan	2:16
17.	"The Ascent"	Jason Graves	2:26
18.	"Rosetta Suite"	James Hannigan	5:31
19.	"Cry of the Ancients"	James Hannigan	4:26
20.	"Convergence"	James Hannigan	2:43
21.	"Moon Crash"	James Hannigan	7:04
Total length:			1:23:29

=== Dead Space Original Soundtrack (2023) ===
Dead Space Original Soundtrack

Soundtrack album to Dead Space by Trevor Gureckis
- Released: January 11, 2023
- Genre: Video game music
- Length: 60:26
- Label: Electronic Arts

The 2023 remake retained Grave's original music while further tracks were added by Gureckis. Gureckis worked on the score for eighteen months, starting with Gureckis playing through the original game as preparation. Gureckis was inspired in his approach by a story breakdown from the remake's lead writer Joanna Berry, who equated it to "a descent into Hell". Inspired by this imagery, Gureckis sought for ways to distort the score as the game progressed. The musical goal was creating a representation of journeying through Isaac's mind, using recurring themes to create a musical "dialogue" with players. Early in the process, Gureckis wrote suites associated with themes and characters rather than specific scenes, with two mentioned pieces being for the Marker and Unitology. He used pieces of these suites throughout the final score, along with expanded musical elements for Isaac, to create an atmosphere that would immerse players into the world and story.

He described his role as expanding upon the original work, creating new themes for characters such as Nicole and story sections, while incorporating and exploring the musical elements established by Graves. Among the instruments used by Gureckis for his new pieces were cello, violin, and a welded metallic percussion instrument dubbed "Marvin". The score was recorded both with a large orchestra, and in Gureckis's Brooklyn studio. As a homage to the original game, "Twinkle, Twinkle, Little Star" was included. Gureckis created two versions, one with full choir and one for a solo voice. The solo version was chosen as it better matched the original game's version. A soundtrack album was released digitally by Electronic Arts through their music label on January 11, 2023. A physical CD version of the album was released as part of the game's Collector's Edition.

Track list
No.	Title	Length
1.	"Hunger for the Stars"	3:56
2.	"Main Title Theme"	3:53
3.	"The Dead Survive"	3:37
4.	"Zero Gravity"	3:50
5.	"Reborn as One"	2:31
6.	"Tram Station"	6:27
7.	"The Leviathan"	4:39
8.	"Isaac's Hallucination"	2:20
9.	"Make Us Whole"	5:00
10.	"Corruption"	4:34
11.	"Visions of Nicole"	1:46
12.	"Change My Flesh"	2:12
13.	"Convergence is Nigh"	1:56
14.	"The Hive Mind"	7:58
15.	"Escape"	1:19
16.	"Nicole's Theme (Solo Piano)"	2:21
17.	"USG Ishimura is in Trouble"	2:07
Total length:		60:26
