= Dead Space: Martyr =

2010 novel by Brian Evenson

- Author: B. K. Evenson
- Cover artist: Christopher Shy
- Language: English
- Series: Dead Space
- Genre: Science fiction, horror
- Publisher: Tor Books
- Publication date: July 20, 2010
- Publication place: United States
- Media type: Print (Paperback)
- Pages: 416
- ISBN: 0-7653-2503-9

Dead Space: Martyr is a 2010 science fiction horror novel written by B. K. Evenson, published by Tor Books. Martyr forms part of the Dead Space survival horror media franchise developed by Visceral Games and published by Electronic Arts. A prequel entry in the franchise, the novel is set centuries before the events of the main series and follows geophysicist Michael Altman as he investigates an alien artifact called the Black Marker. The novel concludes with Altman being unwillingly used to found Unitology, a religion that worships the Marker.

Martyr was created as part of the wider media expansion leading up to 2011's Dead Space 2. When Evenson was contacted, he accepted the job based on his liking for the series. Although he faced some restrictions imposed by the developer and publisher, Evenson was allowed to flesh out Altman's backstory and question the origins of Unitology within the book. Reception to the novel was generally positive, with journalists noting the new light it brought to the Dead Space universe.

== Background ==
The Dead Space series originated in 2008 with the release of the titular original, developed by Visceral Games. Based on its success, publisher Electronic Arts expanded the series into a "trans-media franchise", with pieces of the series lore distributed through means outside the main series including spin-off titles, movies, and printed media. A core aspect of the game's universe was Unitology, a religion formed around the Markers of the storyline which acts as a recurring antagonist. Inspired by observations on science in Carl Sagan's book The Demon-Haunted World, Unitology was created to represent irrational thought and action prompted by the unknown, together with a need for simple answers in a complex world.

Dead Space: Martyr formed part of this later media expansion, expanding upon the Unitology religion and helping promote the series leading up to the 2011 release of Dead Space 2. It was produced alongside the graphic novel Dead Space: Salvage, the spin-off game Dead Space Ignition, and the animated feature Dead Space: Aftermath. Novelist B. K. Evenson, known for original and licensed work and a dark style of writing and world building, was contacted to create the novel, and accepted due to his liking for the Dead Space series and setting. Evenson wanted to communicate several themes with the narrative; these included the effect of stressful situations on people, the behavior of individuals during societal collapse, and the effects of greed and ambition. He described Altman in the book as unremarkable until put into a difficult situation. One of the challenges was communicating with text the tense style of gameplay players experienced in the first game during zero-G or outer space sections. Due to the nature of the series and several pre-established elements, Evenson had to work within some constraints despite being given freedom by Visceral and Electronic Arts to portray Altman as a complex figure and question the Unitologist narrative surrounding him.

Martyr was first announced in April 2010 with a press release from publisher Tor Books. The book was published on July 20. It was promoted at that year's San Diego Comic-Con. Titan Books republished the book on January 28, 2011, alongside Dead Space 2. Evenson later collaborated on the series again with Dead Space: Catalyst, a second prequel novel set during the period of experimentation with the Markers.

== Synopsis ==
Martyr is set in 2214, 296 years before the main events of the original Dead Space and at the beginning of the series' timeline. In the wider narrative, humanity discovers an alien artifact called the Black Marker, which has the potential to produce limitless energy for the resource-starved planet Earth. The Black Marker emits a signal which causes dementia and psychosis, culminating in outbreaks of hostile reanimated corpses dubbed Necromorphs. The storyline focuses on the birth of Unitology, a religious movement that worships the Marker, and the origins of the derivative Red Markers.

After a Necromorph body washes up on a Mexican beach near the Chicxulub crater, the local inhabitants burn the corpse, though a local named Chava finds his wise woman dead from suicide afterwards. Geophysicist Michael Altman, working with his girlfriend, anthropologist Ada Chavez, is investigating a gravitational signal from the Chicxulub crater that appears to be associated with recent events. Altman meets with Charles Hammond, a freelance worker hired by resource corporation DredgerCorp to investigate the signal in secret. After Altman leaves, Hammond suffers auditory hallucinations and is approached by a seemingly hostile group, committing suicide in his growing delusional state. DredgerCorp sends a bathyscaphe down into the crater to investigate the object at its center; one of the crew members has a hallucination that reveals the object to be the Black Marker. When the Marker is drilled, the signal drives the crewman insane, killing his partner and using the blood to daub symbols on the bathyscaphe interior and his own body before he dies of oxygen starvation. Altman investigates and then leaks the video findings from the bathyscaphe dive, forcing DredgerCorp to stage a press conference to spin a face-saving narrative.

The conference is ineffective, so DredgerCorp partners with the military, who send an ocean research facility to the crater in the wake of the local DredgerCorp manager's delusion-induced suicide. Due to his activities, Altman is approached by DredgerCorp and the military, who decide to include him as a team member. In the research facility, he reunites with Ada and other scientists from around the world, befriends submarine pilot Hendricks, and forms an antagonistic relationship with the local military leader Markoff. Altman is forced to help in the recovery of the bathyscaphe after one of the pilots dies in mysterious circumstances. During the dive, Hendricks cracks and tries to kill him, but Altman fends him off and salvages the bathyscaphe, also seeing a Necromorph fish. On the surface, he steals a salvaged Marker fragment and a piece of unknown organic material from the bathyscaphe exterior, giving the matter to the scientists and keeping the Marker fragment for private study. Hendricks is later killed when he escapes confinement. On several more dives, Altman survives similar events with other co-pilots, and he deduces that the Marker has mind-controlling abilities that do not affect him.

Altman helps Markoff bring the Marker to the surface, which triggers mass hysteria; those scientists who do not go insane and commit suicide begin worshipping the Marker and treating Altman as its prophet due to his immunity, which Altman uses to gather more data on the Marker. He and Ada are transported off the research facility, but their guards suffer hallucinations, and the pair escapes. The military catches up with them in D.C., after Altman releases knowledge of the Marker to the world; Ada is killed, while Altman is tortured by Markoff's agents. He is saved when the military brings him back to calm the growing cult on the research facility, supported by the Marker-worshipping Harman. The Marker soon triggers an outbreak of Necromorphs, which kill the surviving staff and military personnel. Altman escapes to shore, learning of Ada's death in a Marker vision, and kills assassins sent by Markoff before being taken in by Chava. With Chava's help, Altman uses a chainsaw to kill Necromorphs, then returns to the facility and destroys it, sinking the Marker back into the ocean. Harman, who now worships Altman, assaults him and brings him to Markoff. Markoff, revealing himself to be a believer in the Marker, arranges for Altman to be killed by a surviving Necromorph, becoming a martyr and the founding figure of Unitology, while also copying his research to create copies of the Marker.

== Reception ==
Michael Urban of The Escapist, while initially skeptical, praised the book as "a genuine page-turner that succeeded in fleshing out the backstory of the Dead Space saga while also providing a read that [is] interesting and well-written in its own right." Dread Central's Steve Barton felt there was too much padding from references to other parts of the series, but said it was still a good read, praising its opening suspense elements and later turn to horror. In an article for Official Xbox Magazine about the expanded media of different video game series, Mitch Dyer noted a lack of tension in the writing of Martyr compared to the rest of the series, but praised the plot twist at the end of the book and its fleshing out of Unitology. Steve Hogarty, writing for PSM3, cited it as a book for fans of the series due to its additions to the series lore. Play, as part of an article on Dead Space 3, positively cited the book as providing fan-requested backstory to the series as a whole.
