= Dead Space Ignition =

2010 video game

- Developers: Sumo Digital; Visceral Games
- Publisher: Electronic Arts
- Director: Wright Bagwell
- Producer: Rich Briggs
- Designer: Tim Spencer
- Programmer: James Graves
- Artist: Andy Ritson
- Writer: Antony Johnston
- Composer: Jason Graves
- Series: Dead Space
- Platforms: PlayStation 3; Xbox 360
- Release: PlayStation 3; October 12, 2010; Xbox 360; October 13, 2010
- Genres: Action, puzzle
- Modes: Single-player, multiplayer

Dead Space Ignition is a 2010 action puzzle video game co-developed by Sumo Digital and Visceral Games. It was published by Electronic Arts for PlayStation 3 and Xbox 360. A spin-off of the Dead Space series, it serves as a prequel to 2011's Dead Space 2. It is set on the Sprawl, a city built upon the remains of the moon Titan. The player takes the role of Franco Delille, an engineer who witnesses and navigates round the initial outbreak of the hostile alien Necromorphs. The gameplay combines hacking minigames with motion comic-style cutscenes featuring multiple story paths.

Production of Ignition was part of Electronic Arts's efforts at creating both a wider media franchise around Dead Space, and as part of a new marketing strategy of using small standalone video games to promote larger titles. Series composer Jason Graves and veteran writer Antony Johnston both returned to work on the game. It was offered as a free download with pre-orders of Dead Space 2, unlocking a new costume and story content within that game upon completion. Reception of Ignition was generally negative, with many faulting its art and gameplay compared to the rest of the series.

== Gameplay ==
The "Trace Route" minigame from Dead Space Ignition

Dead Space Ignition is an action puzzle video game which combines interactive storytelling through third-person motion comic cutscenes and a selection of minigames played from a top-down perspective. The storyline branches at several points, leading down different routes for the two protagonists and four different endings; this approach has been described as "choose your own adventure". Between story sections, the player engages in one of three hacking minigames; "Hardware Crack", "System Override" and "Trace Route".

"Hardware Crack" is a logic puzzle where the player must align colored beams to charge up power nodes on a grid using reflectors and redirecting nodes. While all stages include red and green nodes, some include yellow nodes that require different beam colors to be combined. "System Override" is a reversed tower defence minigame where the player acts as the hostile force breaking down a system's defences to access it. The player must both send attacking virus units to destroy the enemy terminal, and defend themselves from antivirus attack with nodes that slow down or destroy them.

"Trace Route" is a side-scrolling racing simulation where the player "trace" races against a system's countermeasures to access its mainframe, which rests at the end of a course with shifting obstacles and geometry. During a race, the player can cross speed boost areas, and drop firewalls to slow down the countermeasures. The player can also hit obstacles which slow their speed or invert the player's controls. As the scenario progresses, the minigames increase in difficulty. There are versions of the minigames playable in online multiplayer, and online leaderboards charting high scores.

== Synopsis ==
Dead Space: Ignition takes place in the year 2510, directly before the events of Dead Space 2. The action takes place on the Sprawl, a space station built in the remains of Saturn's moon Titan in a period where humanity survived near-extinction due to resource depletion by mining other planets. The events of Ignition detail the opening outbreak of reanimated mutated corpses referred to outside the game as "Necromorphs", setting up the opening of Dead Space 2.

Sprawl engineer Franco Delille begins his working day with girlfriend Sarah Andarsyn, with the Sprawl's maintenance workforce spread thin due to a recent glut of system malfunctions. The station is eventually attacked by Necromorphs, and the pair are forced to run while receiving further missions. During their time together, Delille receives private messages from the Church of Unitology, eventually rousing Andarsyn's suspicions.

The game's narrative diverges between fixing a lighting failure, or resolving a hostage situation caused by an unhinged resident. Regardless of the path chosen Andarsyn will die, either through circumstance or because Delille is forced to kill her to proceed with the Church's mission. Delille then proceeds with his mission from the Unitologists; finding and rescuing series protagonist Isaac Clarke from an EarthGov asylum. Delille appears briefly in the beginning of Dead Space 2, freeing Isaac before being killed and transformed into a Necromorph.

== Development ==
Ignition was part of a move by series publisher Electronic Arts to expand the Dead Space series into a multimedia narrative; it was being done alongside the comic book Dead Space: Salvage, the novel spin-off Dead Space: Martyr, and the animated feature Dead Space: Aftermath. It also formed part of Electronic Arts's strategy of selling smaller gaming experiences related to their larger titles. There was extensive coordination between scripting the story sequences, developing the minigames, and ensuring unlockables for the main game worked.

The style of Ignition as an interactive comic book was described as the "next level" of expanded storytelling after the original game was supplemented by a comic book and animation. The title was proposed to series developer Visceral Games by Sumo Digital, winning them over through their enthusiasm for the franchise. The scenario and script were written by Antony Johnston, who had previously written for multiple pieces of Dead Space media; he also contributed to the character design drafts. Jason Graves, series composer since Dead Space, also returned following his work on Alpha Protocol.

Ignition was announced in July 2010. The PlayStation 3 version released on October 12, 2010, through PlayStation Network. It released through Xbox Live for Xbox 360 on October 13. The title was also offered as a free download for players who pre-ordered Dead Space 2. Playing through Ignition and completing each ending unlocked multiple extras, including a new outfit and additional audio and text logs, in Dead Space 2.

== Reception ==
Reception

Aggregate score
Aggregator	Score	
Aggregator	PS3	Xbox 360
Metacritic	36/100	35/100

Review scores
Publication	Score	
Publication	PS3	Xbox 360
1Up.com	D−	D−
Eurogamer	3/10	3/10
Game Informer	N/A	2.5/10
GameSpot	4/10	4/10
IGN	4.5/10	4.5/10
Official Xbox Magazine (US)	N/A	3.5/10
PALGN	5/10	N/A

The game received "generally unfavorable reviews" on both platforms according to the review aggregation website Metacritic. The gameplay was universally criticised as boring, poorly designed, or only serving as filler content. The storyline saw mixed responses, mainly due to a lack of chemistry between the two leads. The artwork was generally panned for its quality and animation. The voice work saw mixed responses; some noted it as a positive, while most criticised it for its pacing and delivery. When mentioned, the sound design was praised.

Taylor Cocke of 1Up.com, giving the website's lowest score, compared the presentation to "a cheap '80s Saturday morning cartoon" and said that only franchise fans would find any enjoyment. Eurogamer's Chris Shilling felt the concept behind the game was sound, but undermined by poor execution in its presentation and minigames. Giancarlo Varanini of GameSpot said there was "nothing remarkable about either the story or gameplay of Ignition", citing its only positive as the unlockables for Dead Space 2. Game Informer's had a similar opinion to Varanini, faulting the minigames and artwork.

IGN's Greg Miller found the story and sound design engaging, but faulted the rest of the game as a waste of time for players due to the minigames' varying quality and its short playtime. Official Xbox Magazine found little need to play the title apart from its unlockables for Dead Space 2, otherwise panning the game as boring and poorly produced. Cody Giunta of PALGN described the game as a decent attempt to fill in a narrative gap and experiment with new ideas for the franchise, but felt it was let down by its presentation and game design.
