= Dead Space (mobile game) =

2011 mobile game

- Developer: IronMonkey Studios
- Publisher: Electronic Arts
- Designers: Jarrad Trudgen; Edward Hunter
- Writer: Antony Johnston
- Composer: Jason Graves
- Series: Dead Space
- Platforms: iOS; Android
- Release: iOS; January 25, 2011; Android; December 2011
- Genre: Survival horror
- Mode: Single-player

Dead Space is a 2011 survival horror mobile game developed by Australian company IronMonkey Studios and published by Electronic Arts for iOS and Android-compatible devices. A spin-off within the Dead Space series, the game is set after the events of original Dead Space and prior to the events of Dead Space 2 and shows how the Necromorph outbreak began and spread through the Titan Sprawl. Gameplay features protagonist Vandal navigating through chapter-based environments, fighting Necromorphs.

Production of the game took one year. While an early concept was for a rail shooter, the production team decided to recreate the atmosphere and gameplay of the main series within the technical and control constraints of the mobile platform. Returning Dead Space staff included scenario writer Antony Johnston and composer Jason Graves. All versions of the game have been taken down as of 2016. The game saw positive reviews from critics for its quality and accurate recreation of the series atmosphere.

== Gameplay ==
A Necromorph attacks Vandal. Note the touchscreen specific control method whereby the player must swipe down and to the right to fight back.

The gameplay is similar to that of the original Dead Space game, with most changes centering on adapting the game to play with touchscreen controls. Players slide their thumbs on either side of the screen to simulate the dual analog movement scheme of the original; movement on the left of the screen moves the character, movement on the right moves the camera. Players tilt the device to rotate the weapon's alignment. Players can move and explore freely, interact with objects, collect items and currency, and buy upgrades in much the same fashion as the original game. To reload, the player taps the weapon, and contextual swipes upwards or downwards are occasionally necessary. To fire, the player taps the screen to aim, and taps the screen again to shoot. All weapons are picked up as Vandal progresses through different parts of the sprawl ranging from the Plasma Saw which is a close range melee weapon used to slice or cut enemies in close proximity or during a grapple attack, The Plasma Cutter is Vandal's first long range weapon acquired shortly after the Plasma Saw, it is the first weapon which allowed Vandal to shoot enemies further away from her, weapons like the Line Gun and Ripper are acquired later in the story, Vandal will collect up to five weapons throughout the entire game, only one gun was added to the store for purchase with in-game credits as a DLC which came with an updated version of the game that brought enhanced graphics for new iPhones and iPad Devices.

The Xperia Play version has slightly different controls insofar as it utilizes the slide-out game pad, complete with "touch-pad" controls, with the left and right triggers used for aiming and firing respectively.

== Synopsis ==
The mobile Dead Space takes place in the year 2510, directly before the events of Dead Space 2. The action takes place on the Sprawl, a space station built in the remains of Saturn's moon Titan in a period where humanity survived near-extinction due to resource depletion by mining other planets. The mobile game follows "Vandal", a new convert to the Unitologist faith as they are sent on missions and experience the causes behind the opening outbreak of reanimated mutated corpses referred to outside the game as "Necromorphs", setting up the opening of Dead Space 2.

Vandal is directed over a headset to destroy a series of power boxes, cutting off communications to certain parts of the station. After doing so, Vandal is attacked by a group of Necromorphs and forced to flee. A broadcast from Unitology leader Daina Le Guin reveals that Vandal's actions have released the Necromorphs onto the station. Disgusted at being used, Vandal helps the Sprawl's director Hans Tiedemann re-establish quarantine, and then promises to help Tyler Radikov, a Unitologist contact who claims to have been fooled by Le Guin, escape. Radikov ultimately tricks Vandal into opening all Public Sector doors, leaving the Sprawl defenseless, and a furious Tiedemann demands Vandal shut down the Sprawl's overheating core. Finding a giant Necromorph jamming the core, Vandal defeats it, but is wounded in the process and loses their helmet, revealing "Vandal" to be a woman called Karrie Norton. Failing to contact Tiedemann, Norton leaves a final audio log, and Radikov informs Le Guin that the Necromorph outbreak was a success.

== Development and release ==
Production of the Dead Space mobile game lasted one year, and was primarily developed by IronMonkey Studios, a division of franchise owner and publisher Electronic Arts, with assistance from series developer Visceral Games. Jarrad Trudgen acted as co-producer with Paul Motion and lead designer. Returning staff were scenario writer Antony Johnston, and series composer Jason Graves. Ultimately The team worked closely with Visceral Games to ensure the atmosphere and experience was as close as possible to the main series, using the original game's sound library to ensure its sound design was accurate. A central part of the narrative was how Vandal is used by the Unitologists, continuing the recurring theme of examining how cults and corrupt religious figures could manipulate and harm people through their faith. Alongside recreating some environments from Dead Space 2, new areas and weapons were created, retaining the "gritty, lived-in feel" through reference to the main series art design.

During its early development, Trudgen considered making the game a rail shooter similar to the console spin-off Dead Space: Extraction. Ultimately it was decided to stick to the survival horror gameplay of the console games, though this came with multiple technical challenges and problems with touchscreen controls. The gameplay focus was placed on combat over puzzles, with health regeneration and multiple difficulty levels incorporated to make the game more accessible to casual players Strategic dismemberment, a recurring element of the series, was one of the retained features despite difficulties with the physics engine rendering severed limbs. When creating the horror elements, the team designed a scripting engine similar to a console game which allowed for the design of visual and audio scares. Teleport and asset switching scripts were used to help design the hallucination sequences. The main challenge for the team was the platform's technical limitations, with everything being created for the game using concept art as a reference rather than porting existing console assets. They also went through multiple iterations of touchscreen based control layout, finding a balance between people being able to control the character comfortably and the minimal diegetic UI design of the Dead Space series. Optimising the game so it would work on older mobile devices was an important part of production, ultimately not needing any cuts.

The mobile game was announced in October 2010. The iOS version was released first on January 25, 2011 by Electronic Arts. It was updated in May with a new weapon, chapter select, a survival mode, and a new difficulty level. The survival mode is a timed horde mode which the player has a mode timer which counts down and must kill enemies to increase it thus preventing it from reaching 0 which kills the player, the mode once started goes on forever until player quits or dies from the timer or from enemies, the mode features a couple of maps which are locations taken from the story mode. Versions adjusted for Xperia Play and BlackBerry devices were released, using the iOS version. The Android version was released in December 2011. It was also announced for Windows Phone 8 as part of a deal with Nokia that saw several EA games released exclusively on Nokia branded Windows Phones. The iOS version was quietly removed from the App Store by Electronic Arts along with a number of other mobile titles from their library. The Android version was taken down between January and March 2016.

== Reception ==
Reception

Aggregate score
Aggregator	Score
Metacritic	88/100

Review scores
Publication	Score
Destructoid	8/10
Eurogamer	8/10
IGN	8.5/10
Pocket Gamer	8/10
TouchArcade	5/5
148Apps	4.5/5
AppSpy	5/5
TouchGen	5/5

Awards
Publication	Award
Meffy Awards	Best Mobile Game (2011)
App Store Rewind	iPad Game of the Year (2011)

Upon release, Dead Space received very positive reviews. The iOS version holds aggregate scores of 88 out of 100 on Metacritic based on 22 reviews, The game won "Best Mobile Game" (2011) at the Meffy Awards and "iPad Game of the Year" (2011) at the App Store Rewind. During the 15th Annual Interactive Achievement Awards, the Academy of Interactive Arts & Sciences nominated Dead Space for "Mobile Game of the Year".

Reviews emphasized the extent to which the title replicated the look and feel of the Dead Space series within the limitations of a mobile touchscreen device, whilst also praising the fact that the game was a new story, not simply a port of the original Dead Space game.

AppSpy's Andrew Nesvadba was extremely impressed, scoring it 5 out of 5 and writing, "Dead Space is a chilling experience that goes well beyond the normal expectations for mobile gaming." TouchArcade's Brad Nicholson also scored it 5 out of 5. He was critical of the controls and the combat system, but concluded that "Dead Space is worth a download based on its production values alone. The team has successfully created a very, very dark title bolstered by a rich atmosphere that oozes everything you want out of a solid horror game." TouchGen's Matt Dunn also scored it 5 out of 5. He was slightly critical of the controls, but commented that "literally the only negative aspect of the game involves some control inaccuracy." He praised the sound design and graphics and concluded that "Dead Space is the best action game I've ever played on an iOS device. It's the first time I've felt like a mobile version of a game has had as much developer love put into it as its console counterpart. We've seen decent ports, and good mobile counterparts to console games, but never a game that looks and feels this close to the original [...] This isn't a cash grab or a cheap port, this is a brand new Dead Space experience."

Blake Grundman of 148Apps was equally impressed, scoring the game 4.5 out of 5, and writing "it is staggering to imagine that such a huge experience could be contained within the constraints of the iPhone, but not only does it succeed, it sets a benchmark that could be nigh impossible to match any time soon," and referring to the control scheme as "shockingly well constructed." He concluded, "To say that Dead Space is one of the best games that we have seen in 2011 doesn't do it justice. This is one of the most immersive experiences available on the platform. You owe it to yourself to discover that an iOS game can in fact make you shudder in fear and want to jump out of your skin. It isn't merely a game, it is an experience that all iOS gamers should partake in."

IGN's Levi Buchanan, scoring the game 8.5 out of 10, made a similar point; "Dead Space is not a cop-out, shoehorned experience – it's a real-deal chapter in the Dead Space franchise that fits right in with the console games even though it takes a slightly different tack by de-emphasizing shock-jumps and laying on action scene after action scene. But that just means EA understands the differences (and, yes, limitations) of the iDevices. Dead Space has good controls, great visuals, and a fun story. It may repeat itself a little too much, but the blood-soaked ride never feels bloated."

James Stephanie Sterling of Destructoid scored the game 8 out of 10. Although she was somewhat critical of the controls, she was impressed with how genuine a Dead Space experience the game offered; "Dead Space for the iDevices is no mere cash-in. Rather than go the easy route with an on-rails shooter or a selection of banal minigames, Electronic Arts and IronMonkey Studios have instead opted to cram a genuine third-person Dead Space experience into your iPhone. The weird thing is it more or less works [...] it really is impressive just how authentic a Dead Space experience has been crafted, and the generally high caliber of the game could at least justify an XBLA/PSN port." Eurogamer's Kritan Reed also scored the game 8 out of 10, writing "This all-new Dead Space is surprisingly faithful to the full-fat versions in every sense. Before you recoil in horror at the thought of another borked touch-screen attempt at twin-stick action-adventuring, Dead Space is far more entertaining than it has any right to be. It not only captures the intricate, moody visual signature of Visceral's originals with stunning efficiency, but manages to faithfully translate the gameplay." Pocket Gamer's Tracy Erickson also scored it 8 out of 10, giving it a "Silver Award". He was critical of the controls but concluded that "its presentation, well-constructed levels, and tense combat situations are enough to see you through, even if the controls won't."
