= Sonita Henry =

British actress

- Born: 23 January 1977 (age 49); Dover, Kent, England
- Occupation: Actress
- Years active: 1997–present

Sonita Henry (born 23 January 1977) is an English actress. On television, she is known for her roles in the Spike series Olympus (2015), the Acorn TV series The Chelsea Detective (2022), the Hulu series Black Cake and the Apple TV+ series Silo (both 2023).

== Early life ==
Sonita Henry was born in Dover, Kent to an English father of Scottish descent and a Guyanese-Nepalese mother. After earning her degree in journalism, Henry studied acting at the Herbert Bergoff Studio in New York.

== Career ==
In 1996, Henry portrayed the aide to President Lindberg (played by Tommy "Tiny" Lister Jr.) in The Fifth Element (1997). In 1998, Henry appeared in Celebrity, written and directed by Woody Allen.

In 2007, Henry guest-starred in an episode of CBS' Without a Trace, starring Enrique Murciano and Eric Close. In 2008, Henry was seen in the independent film Garden Party. In 2009, Henry was seen in Star Trek. Henry voiced Ellie Langford in the Dead Space video games, as well as guest-starring in NCIS, Chuck, Law & Order: LA, and Doctor Who.

In 2015, Henry had her first main television role in the Spike series Olympus as Medea.

In 2022, Henry starred in the Acorn TV series The Chelsea Detective. She played Mabel Martin in the Hulu drama Black Cake.

She has an upcoming role in the Apple TV series Disavowed.

== Personal life ==
Some sources claim Henry briefly dated Brad Pitt.

== Filmography ==
=== Films ===
Year	Title	Role
1997	The Fifth Element	President's Aide
2009	Star Trek	Kelvin Doctor
2017	That Good Night	Dr Ana Blasco
2024	Deadpool & Wolverine	Mrs Chipman
2024	Role Play	Karen Shah

=== Television ===
Year	Title	Role	Note
1998	Celebrity	Film Festival Guest (uncredited)	
1998	Jaunt V2	Delphine	Short
2001	Out of the Darkness	Jamie	
2003	Straight No Chaser	Sydney	Short
2007	Without a Trace	Business Woman	Episode: "Skin Deep"
2008	Garden Party	Celine	
2009	NCIS	Captain Rebecca 'Becky' Hastings	Episode: "Truth or Consequences"
2010	Cold Case	Juanita Renaldo '09 · '10	Episode: "Bullet"
2011	Dead Space 2	Ellie Langford (voice)	
2011	Chuck	Dr. Ayub	Episode: "Chuck Versus the Push Mix)
2011	Law & Order: LA	Joy Glick	
2011	Nowhereland Exhibit	Saga	Episode: "Eaters Pt. 1" and "Eaters Pt. 2"
2013	Doctor Who	Colonel Meme	Episode: "The Time of the Doctor"
2014	Young Dracula	Farah	Episode: "Open House" and "The Bodyguard"
2015	Olympus	Medea	13 Episodes
2016	Motherland	Sunita	
2017	I Live with Models	Gail	
2017	Back	Daisy (uncredited)	Season 1 Episode 1
2018	The Good Karma Hospital	Sweta Kaimal	Season 2 Episode 4
2019	Luther	Daria Shubik	Season 5 Episode 1 and Episode 4
2019	Vera	Sadie	Episode: "Cold River"
2019	This Time with Alan Partridge	Producer	Season 1 Episode 1 and Episode 3
2018-2019	Krypton	Raika	Season 1: "House of Zod", "Civil Wars" and "Hope" Season 2: "Light-Years from Home" and "Danger Close"
2020	Home	Monica	Season 2 Episode 1 and Episode 5
2020	Breeders	Dr. Cooper	
2019-2020	Into the Dark	Dr. Larson	
2020	Absentia	Michelle	Season 3 Episodes: Alea lacta Est, In Quo Ego Vado Vos, Iterum Nata
2021	TNTW Project 2	Carly	Short
2022	The Chelsea Detective	DS Priya Shamsie	Season 1 (4 Episodes)
2022	Surfside Girls	Dr. Pfeiffer	Season 1 Recurring
2022	Midsomer Murders	Clodagh Kaine	Episode: The Blacktrees Prohecy
2023	Father Brown	Charlotte 'Charlie' Maidland	Episode: The Show Must Go On
2023	Silo	Regina Jackson	Episode: The Relic
2023	Mix Tape	Liv	
2023	Black Cake	Mabel Martin	Season 1 Recurring
2025	Wild Cherry	Detective Khan	5 episodes
2026	Honey	Anne Anderson	

=== Games ===
Year	Title	Role
2011	Dead Space 2	Ellie Langford (voice)
2012	PlayStation All-Stars Battle Royale	Ellie Langford (voice)
2013	Dead Space 3	Ellie Langford (voice)
2019	Ghost Recon: Breakpoint	Stephanie Burgess - Deep State DLC (voice)
