= Dead Space 2 =

2011 video game

- Developer: Visceral Games
- Publisher: Electronic Arts
- Director: Wright Bagwell
- Producer: David Woldman
- Designers: John Calhoun; Jatin Patel
- Programmer: Steve Timson
- Artist: Ian Milham
- Writer: Jeremy Bernstein
- Composer: Jason Graves
- Series: Dead Space
- Platforms: PlayStation 3; Windows; Xbox 360
- Release: NA: January 25, 2011; AU: January 27, 2011; EU: January 28, 2011
- Genre: Survival horror
- Modes: Single-player, multiplayer

Dead Space 2 is a 2011 survival horror game developed by Visceral Games and published by Electronic Arts. It was released for PlayStation 3, Windows, and Xbox 360 in January. The second mainline entry in the Dead Space series, set on the Titan-based Sprawl space station, follows series protagonist Isaac Clarke as he fights against both an outbreak of the monstrous Necromorphs and debilitating mental illness induced by the alien Markers. Gameplay features Isaac exploring a series of levels, solving puzzles to progress, and finding resources while fighting off Necromorphs. The game included a competitive multiplayer, with the Sprawl's security forces fighting teams of Necromorphs.

Pre-production began in 2008, immediately following the release of the original Dead Space. The storyline, alongside building upon and expanding the series lore, focused on Isaac's deteriorating mental state, with classic nursery rhymes being used as motifs playing into the narrative and Isaac's visions. The gameplay was adjusted based on feedback from players and the team's experience, in addition to making it faster-paced and having more overt action elements. Multiplayer was included as a separate mode based on both fan feedback and requests from Electronic Arts.

Announced in 2010, Dead Space 2 saw an extensive marketing campaign from its publisher. It was supplemented by several other multimedia projects including the novel Dead Space: Martyr, the animated movie Dead Space: Aftermath, the spin-off game Dead Space Ignition, and a mobile prequel. Reviews of the game praised its gameplay and audio and level design, with many calling it superior to the original Dead Space. The game sold two million copies during its opening week, but according to later developer interviews Electronic Arts was disappointed in its commercial performance. A direct sequel, Dead Space 3, was released in 2013.

== Gameplay ==
Isaac Clarke, wearing the game's Advanced RIG suit, fights off a swarm of Necromorphs.

Dead Space 2 is a science-fiction-themed survival horror video game. Players control lead character Isaac Clarke from a third-person perspective through a level-based narrative campaign. Isaac navigates the Sprawl space station completing narrative-based missions, solving puzzles within the environment, and fighting monsters dubbed Necromorphs. Saving is done manually at crafting stations, and automatically at checkpoints. The New Game Plus allows players to carry over all current items and equipment into a new campaign. There are four difficulty levels unlocked at the game's start; Casual, Normal, Survivalist, Zealot. A fifth difficulty level, Hard Core, is unlocked after the first playthrough; Hard Core restarts the player from their last save with each death and only allows three saves across the campaign.

As with the original Dead Space, in-game information is shown through diegetic holographic projections. Isaac's health and energy meters are shown on the back of his RIG suit, ammunition counts are shown on the weapons themselves, and opening the inventory screen does not pause the game. Audio and text logs can be picked up and reviewed during gameplay. A guideline can display the route to the next objective. While exploring, Isaac can break crates in the environment using either his melee attack or a stomp action. Two further abilities are Kinesis, which can move or pull objects in the environment including using Necromorph limbs as makeshift projectile weapons, and Stasis, which slows a target's movement for a limited time. Some areas are subject to zero-G, with Isaac using his RIG suit to explore areas, with jet packs allowing manoeuvres across all directions and a boost function to speed through the environment. During some sections, Isaac can explore vacuum areas, though he has a limited air supply which must be replenished using oxygen tanks. Before using some devices or opening some doors, a hacking minigame must be completed on a time limit. Displaying as a circular graphic with a bar showing a display area, the player must manoeuvre the bar and press a button when the highlighted area is green, with pressing the button when the color is red causing an electric shock for Isaac.

While exploring, Isaac must fight different types of Necromorphs which emerge from the environment; on any but the lowest difficulty, Necromorphs can remain active and attack despite heavy damage. Using his assigned weapon, Isaac must cut off the Necromorphs' limbs to kill them, able to switch several weapons between horizontal and vertical firing modes. He can also stomp them to deal damage. There are also cinematic sections such as using the RIG suit's jets to avoid debris, and quick time events that can lead to a game over if failed. Weapons can be upgraded using nodes, which are installed at crafting stations and increase their power or ammunition. During exploration, items such as health packs and upgrade nodes, and ammunition for Isaac's weapons, can be either bought from shopping terminals, or picked up in the environment. In the latter case they can also be found on enemy corpses or retrieved from crates. Weapon schematics can also be found, being uploaded to the store on the next visit after being found and allowing Isaac to acquire new weapons and armor. Isaac's inventory is limited, with excess items able to be stored in a safe at save terminals.

Alongside the single-player campaign, a separate competitive multiplayer mode is included. Known as Outbreak mode, teams of four players take control of either a team defending the Sprawl, or a set of four Necromorph types whose goal is to kill the human team and feature slightly different controls. In the various modes, the human team is given different objectives ranging from defending a point, killing the Necromorph team, or completing an assigned technical task. The human team is given a series of five objectives to complete with each map. Each round swaps the players between the human and Necromorph teams. Necromorph players can choose the Necromorph they will spawn as: a Lurker, a Puker, a Spitter, or a member of the Pack. The maps, while using Sprawl locations mentioned in the main campaign, are unique to the multiplayer. Completing matches rewards experience points, unlocking rewards tailored to each side up to the level cap of 60.

== Synopsis ==
=== Setting and characters ===
Dead Space 2 takes place in the year 2511, three years after the events of Dead Space. The action takes place on the Sprawl, a space station built by the Earth Government (EarthGov) in the remains of Saturn's moon Titan in a period where humanity survived near-extinction due to resource depletion by mining other planets. During the previous game's events on the planet Aegis VII, an artifact called the Red Marker−copied from an alien artifact by EarthGov during a disastrous attempt to harvest its energy−was uncovered during an illegal mining operation. The mining colony was funded by the Church of Unitology, a group that worships the Markers as divine and seeks an event of physical and spiritual union called Convergence. The Marker's influence triggered crippling mental illness in the colony, then the outbreak of a virus-like organism that reanimates corpses and turns them into Necromorphs, which overwhelmed the colony and the mining ship USG Ishimura. By the events of Dead Space 2, the Aegis VII incident has been covered up, and new Marker experiments begun on the Sprawl.

The protagonist is Isaac Clarke, a Concordance Extraction Corporation (CEC) engineer who was sent with a team to the Ishimura and narrowly survived the infestation while destroying the Marker and the Necromorphs. Assisting Isaac are Ellie Langford, a CEC heavy machinery pilot; Nolan Stross, a fellow patient of Isaac whose exposure to the Aegis VII Marker has left him insane; and Daina Le Guin. Director Hans Tiedeman is an EarthGov administrator in charge of the Sprawl who initiates a project to build another Marker in an attempt to control its power and opposes Isaac. Isaac is also frequently tormented by visions of Nicole Brennan, his girlfriend who died on the Ishimura. Minor characters include Franco Delille, a hacker sent to rescue Isaac and protagonist of the spin-off Dead Space Ignition, and EarthGov doctor Foster Edgars. The downloadable content (DLC) story Dead Space: Severed follows Sergeant Gabe Weller, a Sprawl security officer who races to save his wife Lexine Murdoch from both the Necromorphs and EarthGov. Both are returning characters from the spin-off Dead Space: Extraction.

=== Plot ===
Isaac Clarke, suffering from Marker-induced dementia and violent hallucinations, escapes from Necromorphs at the mental hospital holding him and is guided to safety by Le Guin. Isaac finds the Sprawl overrun and being evacuated en masse, with the citizens left behind either being killed or committing suicide due to the Marker's influence. Le Guin reveals that Tiedemann recreated a Marker using the data in Isaac's mind, using memory-blocking drugs on Isaac to prevent that data from destroying his mind. Isaac runs into the highly disturbed Stross, who claims to know how to destroy the new Marker. When Isaac reaches Le Guin, she reveals herself as a Unitologist sent to capture Isaac. An EarthGov ambush kills her and her henchmen, allowing Isaac to escape. He soon allies with Ellie, who reluctantly guards Stross as they navigate the Sprawl, fighting both the Necromorphs and Tiedemann's attempts to contain them. Isaac is regularly tormented by visions of Nicole Brennan, who keeps asking Isaac to make them "whole". To reach the Sprawl's government sector where Tiedemann is holding up with the Marker, Isaac is forced to navigate the decommissioned Ishimura, triggering more hallucinations.

Stross's mental state worsens to the point of attacking Ellie, gouging out her right eye with a screwdriver, then attacking Isaac, who is forced to kill him in self-defense. Ellie helps Isaac get into the government sector, but then he tricks her into getting aboard a shuttle and sends her away to safety. Guided by a friendly version of Nicole, he gets inside the government sector, letting the Necromorphs inside to eliminate Tiedemann's security forces. The Necromorphs gather at the Marker, starting off Convergence, and Isaac uses a machine to unlock the Marker data in his mind. He kills Tiedemann, but is then forced to fight off a final hallucination of Nicole as she was a projection used by the Marker to fulfill its wish of completing Convergence by merging with its creator, Isaac. As the Sprawl begins collapsing from the damage caused by the Marker, Ellie flies in and rescues Isaac. In a post-credits audio conversation, two EarthGov agents discuss further Marker sites.

=== Severed ===
Gabe Weller is on patrol in the Sprawl's mines when the Necromorph attacks begin, warning Lexine, who is pregnant with their child, as he makes his way back to her. Weller is betrayed by his superior Victor Bartlett, who reveals that the pair were subjects of the Oracle Program, intended to study both Lexine and Weller's survival of the Aegis VII incident and the potential use of their child. Bartlett, whom Tiedemann ordered to kill all Marker-related subjects, is later subdued by two high-ranking EarthGov agents known as the Oracles, who take Lexine from him. Weller chases after them, with Lexine retreating into a shuttle when Necromorphs kill the Oracles. Bartlett suicidally attacks Weller with a grenade before he can board; fatally injured, Weller helps Lexine escape the Sprawl. An epilogue reveals Weller's body has been taken for study by EarthGov, while the missing Lexine is to be killed once found.

== Development ==
Pre-production on Dead Space 2 began in 2008 immediately following the release of Dead Space, which was released to critical praise. During this time, series publisher Electronic Arts rebranded the developer EA Redwood Shores as Visceral Games, restructuring it as a genre studio; it worked in parallel on Dead Space 2 and the hack and slash game Dante's Inferno. Describing their relationship with Electronic Arts, producer Shereif Fattouh said Visceral Games was given a large amount of autonomy as they had built up a lot of good will and internal support due to the success and quality of their projects. Executive producer Steve Papoutsis noted that the team felt under pressure, but described it as a self-imposed pressure to meet or surpass fan expectations and produce a quality product. The game was developed for Microsoft Windows, PlayStation 3 and Xbox 360, later described as the series main platforms. A Wii port was in production, but was cancelled in 2011 so Electronic Arts could focus on other projects. There are different reports of the game's budget; level designer Zach Wilson reported a budget of $60 million and called Electronic Arts "merciless" with its allocation, while director Wright Bagwell described the budget as "pretty small" without specifying a figure. Production took roughly two and a half years.

The development team was estimated as having 150 people at its peak, with the studio's focus fully shifting to Dead Space 2 once Dante's Inferno was complete. While many core staff members remained, series creators Glen Schofield and Michael Condrey had left with several other staff members to found Sledgehammer Games. Bagwell took over as director after the first game's director Bret Robbins left the company, working on Dead Space 2 in parallel with his role as director for Dead Space: Extraction. Fattouh, Scott Probst, Cate Latchford, and Rich Briggs acted as producers for the game. David Woldman was senior producer. Papoutsis remained as executive producer. John Calhoun was senior designer, while Matthias Worch acted as senior level designer. The character animator was Veronique Garcia, who had done modeling and animation work for Final Fantasy: The Spirits Within, while Electronic Arts veteran Tony Gialdini was animation director.

The team's aim was to create a more polished version of Dead Space which would appeal to a larger audience; this included incorporating action elements, and making controlling Isaac easier. The shift towards action tone was described as a combination of the influence of new staff members, a wish to broaden the series' appeal, and portray Isaac's character growth. Enemies were redesigned to accommodate the action elements, though the team also worked to maintain the horror elements and atmosphere from the first game. The incorporation of cinematic set pieces were influenced by other popular games of the time including Uncharted 2: Among Thieves. The area around the Ishimura was one of the first areas built as a test for the scale of the Sprawl. When creating the cutscenes, most during chapters were done without hard cuts, instead being merged into the gameplay. The motion capture for story sequences was supervised by Latchford. The scene were first rehearsed, then shot with the actors in motion capture suits shot with over two hundred cameras to create a composite view of characters during cutscenes.

Gameplay elements were included based on positive feedback from the first game. The main additions were destructible environments, included to offer gameplay variety and increase the realism, and launching objects at enemies, which allowed for players to fight when out of ammunition. The team wanted each level to feel unique for players, with Papoutis citing the level in a Unitologist Church as an example of "[keeping] players on their toes". The Ishimura level had little to no enemy encounters to reinforce the tension and the game's themes, with art director Ian Milham successfully pushing back against requests to add in more enemy encounters. Some of the puzzle and level designs were toned down for the final release after negative tester feedback about their difficulty. An early suggested concept was having Isaac voice suggestions if players were struggling with a puzzle. The diegetic UI design was carried over from the original game, with some elements during the opening section tying into the portrayal of Isaac's mental state.

Multiplayer was one of the more requested additions by series fans, which was considered by the development team as they planned out Dead Space 2. According to artist Ben Wanat, the incorporation of multiplayer was also done to appease Electronic Arts, who had been pushing for a multiplayer component since the first game to broaden the series market appeal. As a compromise, the team included it as an entirely separate gameplay mode. Probst acted as supervisor for the multiplayer section of the game. The team started out with asking what would make the multiplayer stand out, choosing a scenario pitting a human team against Necromorphs. The team referenced at other series which incorporated multiplayer around a single-player focused campaign, including the Call of Duty, BioShock and Uncharted series, and Left 4 Dead. The team chose playable Necromorph types based on their design, usability, and potential for players to enjoy. Story elements from the single-player campaign were incorporated into multiplayer, but not in a way that would spoil the story campaign for players who tried the multiplayer first.

=== Scenario ===
Chuck Beaver acted as story producer, as he did for the rest of the series. Beaver and Wanat together coordinated the lore with documentation to ensure continuity. The script was handled by television writer Jeremy Bernstein, brought on board through a chance conversation with one of the game's producers at a Game Developer Conference. Antony Johnston, who worked on Dead Space and its expanded media, jokingly described Bernstein as having "basically hustled the job out from under [him]". While Bernstein drafted the script, the story creation was a collaborative effort between Bernstein and multiple senior designers. As part of the wish to evolve the storytelling of the series, Isaac was changed from a silent protagonist as he was in the first game to one with a voice. The decision was also driven by the wish for Isaac to be a sympathetic character, to be able to interact properly with the game's larger cast, and to show more independence and agency compared to the original where he was generally following orders. Giving Isaac a voice was one of the first decisions made by the developers. One of the concerns was balancing Isaac's dialogue so it would not drag or seem out of place. Speaking about Isaac's portrayal across the series, Papoutsis said Isaac turned a corner from being a victim of events to having a motivation due to his conflict with Tiedmann. Chapter Twelve was intended to have a lighter tone after the previous darker events through the banter between Isaac and Ellie.

Papoutis described Isaac's character following Dead Space as "broken", reflected in his actions and state of mind during Dead Space 2. Isaac's mental illness was portrayed in-game through classic nursery rhymes, with a late-game scene involving Isaac's using a needle probe in his eye taking direct influence from the saying "Cross my heart and hope to die, stick a needle in my eye." The Nicole hallucinations were included to explore Isaac's mental state, reflecting both Isaac's specific trauma and reference real-life situations where people lost loved ones. The questioning of Isaac's sanity and perceptions was reinforced using the hallucinations he experiences during the Ishimura level. A larger supporting cast was another early decision, with the large number of female characters described as a naturally-emerging decision for the world design. Ellie was described by a staff member as the "female interest" for Isaac, and during early production was called "Rose". Stross was created to communicate backstory to Isaac, acting as a possible vision of Isaac's future mental state, additionally playing into the eye theme through his obsessions. During the script drafting, an extensive subplot surrounding Tiedmann was planned; as an unwilling participant in the Marker project, he would have suffered from Marker-driven hallucinations involving survivors revealed to be long dead, giving his arc a tragic conclusion. This was seen as too sympathetic and left the game without a central villain, so he was rewritten as a "more conventional bad guy".

The team also expanded backstory elements that had only been roughly thought through to support the main narrative of Dead Space, turning drafted backstory elements into a cohesive overarching narrative. As with the original, standard cutscenes were supplemented with audio calls between Isaac and other characters, and audio and text logs found during exploration. The opening, which showed Delille being turned into a Necromorph in front of Isaac, was created to set the tone for the game. For the scene, a model for Denille was built to be as anatomically correct as possible, with the death and transformations being a complex process. Denille's face was modelled on Briggs. Unitology remained a core part of the story, with Beaver describing its portrayal as both a general commentary on how organised religion and cults could cause harm, and adding detail for players about its role in the game's universe. Another element given focus was the secret conflict between EarthGov and Unitology, which had only been hinted at in earlier parts of the series and became a main focus for the story design of the Sprawl. The team also continued to deny the religion was an explicit critique of Scientology, with the similar terms and structure shown in Dead Space 2 along with other media being coincidental.

=== Art design ===
Milham returned from the first game as art director, Wanat as production designer, and Alex Muscat came on board as lead environmental artist. As one of the senior leads remaining from the first game, Milham's task was to ensure artistic continuity. During the planning phase, Milham planned out the chapters with different color themes based on the story and atmosphere; an example was the opening level, which used cold blue and white lights due to its hospital setting. Whenever possible, inspiration for the visuals and scenes was drawn from real life rather than using films or other games. Milham wanted to stay away from traditional science fiction imagery, with the first year of development being dedicated to creating concept artwork for the Sprawl. When discussing the lighting, Milham said he wanted to avoid the blue filter used by James Cameron for Terminator 2: Judgment Day or the "green and black sliminess" of Alien, instead using darker lighting styles and color use associated with the work of David Fincher.

Using both player feedback and the new setting, the Sprawl was designed around the concept of an organically-growing city with multiple residents and associated businesses, alongside different utilitarian and leisure spaces. The Sprawl designs drew inspiration from interior design of the 1970s and 80s, with part of the horror based around the Necromorphs' destructive presence. The Unitology cathedral drew from the team's experience creating Gothic-style architecture for the Ishimura interior, additionally visually communicating the religion's beliefs and symbolism including the Marker symbol, modelled on a DNA strand. The EarthGov areas and Marker experiment zone contrasted against other areas with sleek and "cold" designs, emulating other popular science fiction such as 2001: A Space Odyssey and the work of Chris Cunningham. The level set within the Ishimura was both an incorporation for returning players, and a level that could be built using older assets and a low budget allocation as much of the art team were new hires unfamiliar with the game and technology.

Character design was led by Garcia. Isaac's default RIG suit was designed to appear strong without taking away from Isaac's non-military background, with strengthening ribs as a motif and component. The Advanced RIG suit followed the opposite design path, intending to evoke Isaac's growing combat ability against the Necromorphs. Several suit designs reinforced the general aesthetic, but some were designed to have a vintage look, including a suit based on a historic diving suit. The RIG helmet was redesigned slightly so it could realistically fold away to reveal his face for cutscenes and dialogue, while retaining its established shape. His weapons were all designed to have distinctive yet simple shapes, emulating the design of modern tools.

The new Necromorph designs, including child Necromorphs, were influenced by the new Sprawl environment. Several Necromorph designs also served a mechanical purpose, allowing the developers to rely less on closed-room combat scenarios to control pacing. As with the first game, their design was intended to be unsettling and unnatural, being frightening without being too conventionally monstrous. The trauma created by the transformations were selected to play into common fears of injury, alongside fractures and bodily warping being more realistic and disturbing than something like wounds from a laser gun. Alongside returning Necromorphs designs, new larger versions were designed, with the challenge being to realistically portray these larger Necromorphs as amalgamations of the human-sized monsters. The disturbing behavior of the Necrmorphs and associated violence was something the team paid attention to so it would be graphic and disturbing without becoming gratuitous.

=== Audio ===
==== Sound design ====
The chief audio director for Dead Space 2 was Andrew Boyd. Following on from the original's praised audio design, developers wanted to improve it for Dead Space 2. Boyd highlighted the importance of sound design in evoking horror, citing a section where Isaac travels through a residential area and hears noises from inside the sealed apartments. Nicole's visions had different approaches in sound design; hostile visions had sharp and uncomfortable sounds, while her friendly visions used comforting sounds. To distinguish her from the other environmental elements, Nicole was given dedicated sound effects which would play when approaching an encounter with her. The Necromorph sounds were based on distorted real-world sounds, with one example being a staff member who dry heaved to the point of being actually sick. As with the original, the space vacuum used a muffled sound environment, focusing on sounds from within Isaac's suit including his heartbeat and grunts. The Ishimura level was able to recycle sound effects and music from the first game, used by Boyd to reinforce the level's tension.

American actor Gunner Wright voiced and provided motion capture for Isaac, describing the role as interesting due to Isaac's everyman portrayal. During the table reading phase, Wright was given some advice by Beaver about his portrayal, basing it on the character of John McClane as a man forced into a desperate situation. After an initial test recording, it took nine months to get Wright's likeness into the system before more scenes could be filmed. Ellie was portrayed by Sonita Henry, who originally auditioned for a "Therapist" side character, but was recast and remained unaware until the first script reading. Henry described Ellie as a complex person who was unwilling to trust in others after the events she experienced. Dead Space 2 was both her first role in a video game, and her first time using motion capture, which Henry found odd at first due to the lack of visible props and the need to imagine the scenes she was filming with Wright. Stross was voiced by Curt Cornelius. The cast also included Tanya Clarke as Nicole, Lester Purry as Tiedemann, and Tahyna Tozzi as Daina. Voice work was recorded during motion capture sessions whenever possible.

==== Music ====
Jason Graves returned as composer from the first game. He drew inspiration from classical music from the first half of the 20th century, citing Krzysztof Penderecki's Threnody to the Victims of Hiroshima as a point of comparison for the game's focus on strings. Isaac's leitmotif uses the note order D-E-A-D—spelling the word 'DEAD'—and appears throughout the score. The game's main theme, "Lacrimosa", was performed by a string quartet. The music cues in-game were dictated by "fear markers", software flags tripped by the player which altered the music's flow and volume.

== Release ==
Rumors of Dead Space 2 emerged in 2009, with a report from Variety indicating both the series's continuation as a trilogy and a feature film adaptation. The game was officially announced on December 7, 2009. During 2010, footage was shown at E3, and a demo version was showcased at Gamescom. The marketing budget was reportedly a further $60 million. As part of the marketing, Electronic Arts partnered with the design group Renegade Effects to create a real-life version of Isaac's RIG suit, which had become an icon of the series. The suit was featured at the 2010 San Diego Comic-Con. A notable and controversial campaign was a video series using the slogan "Your Mom Hates Dead Space 2"; a group of women were selected based on their conservative attitudes and recorded seeing some of the more violent parts of the game. A Dead Space-themed armor set could be unlocked in Dragon Age II with a code released with Dead Space 2. A PS3-exclusive closed multiplayer beta began on September 23, 2010. Papoutsis said the game was in its "final stretch" of development by October 2010. A demo was released exclusively for the PlayStation 3 and Xbox 360 on December 8, 2010.

Dead Space 2 released worldwide in January 2011; it released in North America on January 25, in Australia on January 27, and in Europe on January 28. In German, the game was delayed into February as the country's rating laws required the friendly fire option be removed from the game, though otherwise its content was unchanged. In response to a petition due to a disabled player being unable to remap the PC controls, Visceral Games developed a patch allowing full button remapping on the platform. Alongside the standard edition, a limited Collector's Edition was released that included a soundtrack CD, a Unitology-themed armor and weapon set, and concept art lithographis. The PC and 360 versions included a replica of the game's standard plasma cutter weapon. A port of Dead Space: Extraction was bundled with both the PS3 Collector's Edition and standard first prints for free, and also released parallel to Dead Space 2 on PlayStation Network. The PS3 version also came with a version of the Rivet Gun from Extraction as an in-game weapon. Having a save file of the first Dead Space unlocked the original plasma cutter as an early bonus weapon.

On January 27, three paid DLC packs were released dubbed "Hazard", "Martial Law", and "Supernova", each containing a themed armour and weapon set. On February 11, a multiplayer contest was held where players fought against a team made up of staff from the game, with winning earning players new armor sets. The DLC expansion Dead Space 2: Severed was announced on January 25. According to producer Scott Probst, Severed was meant to have greater action focus playing into Weller's profession as a security guard. The DLC is exclusive to the console versions, though Electronic Arts gave no detailed explanation for the lack of a PC release. It was released March 1 in North America and Europe, and March 2 in Australia. A final DLC release came on May 24 with the free addition of multiplayer maps based on areas of the main game.

=== Related media ===
Based on the success of the original game, Electronic Arts decided to expand the series into a "trans-media franchise", with pieces of the series lore distributed through means outside the main series including spin-off titles, movies, and printed media. Multiple titles were created to help promote the release Dead Space 2. While the expanded media was handled by different people, Beaver and Wanat acted as supervisors to ensure continuity. Several pieces of the media surrounding Dead Space 2 was written by Johnston, commenting afterwards that it would likely be his final work on the series.

The spin-off action puzzle game Dead Space Ignition, which followed Delille's actions during the initial Necromorph outbreak, was co-developed with Visceral by Sumo Digital and released in October 2010 PS3 and 360. Completing Ignition unlocked bonuses on the console versions of Dead Space 2. A mobile spin-off developed by IronMonkey Studios, again set during the initial outbreak and using gameplay similar to the main series, was released in 2011 for iOS and Android.

A prequel novel Dead Space: Martyr, written by B. K. Evenson, was released on July 20, 2010, by Tor Books; it focuses on the original Black Marker and the role of Michael Altman in Unitology's foundation. The animated movie Dead Space: Aftermath, produced by many of the same team as Dead Space: Downfall in 2008, was released direct-to-video on the same day as the North American release of Dead Space 2; the storyline follows EarthGov's investigation of the Ishimura and accounts of different survivors from an investigation team. Stross was introduced in this movie, with Cornelius voicing the character in both Aftermath and Dead Space 2.

A graphic novel, Dead Space: Salvage, was released on November 24, 2010, by IDW Publishing. Set between the two mainline games, it shows events after a group of salvagers called the Magpies find the wreck of the Ishimura. Salvage was illustrated by Christopher Shy of Studio Ronin. It took roughly a year to finalise the details of his work on the project, and during that time he created sketches and paintings to determine its style. As a fan of the original game, he made notes as to how he could translate his feelings about it into art. At Studio Ronin he created ship models and photographed them using similar lighting to Dead Space, then created the first concept pieces based on those and Johnston's script. As the graphic novel was a spin-off without direct continuity with other titles, he was allowed creative freedom with his designs and artwork. He designed the characters as having a punk rock style with their clothes, with a lived-in appearance that would contrast with the game characters. He also wanted to convincingly portray the insanity of those who worshipped or were enthralled by the Marker. He later described his character designs as having an outlandish aesthetic compared to his later work on the series. Johnston described his work on the story of Salvage as exciting due to it covering an entirely new aspect of the Dead Space universe.

== Reception ==
Reception

Aggregate score
Aggregator	Score		
Aggregator	PC	PS3	Xbox 360
Metacritic	87/100	89/100	90/100

Review scores
Publication	Score		
Publication	PC	PS3	Xbox 360
1Up.com	A-	A-	A-
Computer and Video Games	N/A	N/A	9.5/10
Edge	9/10	9/10	9/10
Eurogamer	9/10	9/10	9/10
Game Informer	N/A	N/A	9/10
GameSpot	8.5/10	9/10	8.5/10
GameTrailers	N/A	N/A	9/10
IGN	9/10	9/10	9/10
Official Xbox Magazine (US)	N/A	N/A	9.5/10
PALGN	N/A	N/A	9/10
PC Gamer (UK)	87%	N/A	N/A

Dead Space 2 received "generally favorable" reviews from critics, while the Xbox 360 version received "universal acclaim", according to review aggregator website Metacritic. Reviews gave general praise to the game for its atmosphere and design, with several critics calling it an improvement over the original. Both Thierry Nguyen of 1Up.com and Carolyn Petit of GameSpot noted the PS3 version as a more attractive version due to the inclusion of Extraction in early copies. The control scheme for the PC version was positively noted by Petit as providing an easier experience for aiming.

Nguyen gave minimal comment towards the story aside from noting its change in pacing and incorporating of cinematic setpieces as part of a general shift towards action. Andy Robinson, writing for Computer and Video Games, praised the more cinematic delivery. Gaming magazine Edge felt that Isaac's new voiced role improved him as a protagonist, praising his interactions with the cast and reactions to the environment. Simon Parkin of Eurogamer enjoyed Isaac's voiced role, and noted the use of Nicole to both scare the player and explore Isaac's mind. Game Informer's Andrew Reiner cited Isaac's mental state as the main strength of the game's plot, Petit praised the combined focus on Isaac and the Necromorph threat, citing the opening and ending sections as the strongest parts of the game. GameTrailers noted a lack of development in the cast and found the visions of Nicole wore thin over time, calling the overall plot forgettable until the final section of the game. IGN's Greg Miller praised the more personal focus of the narrative also noting the rest of the cast as enjoyable but found the mission structure lacking and central plot surrounding the Marker fairly weak. Francesca Reyes, writing for the United States edition of Official Xbox Magazine, enjoyed the story's presentation and Isaac's interactions with the cast, though she felt the later narrative and the handling of Nicole's appearances bogged down the experience. PC Gamer's Dan Stapleton felt the story delivery had improved considerably over the first game, Jeremy Jastrzab of PALGN called the story "remarkably well told" and highlighted the use of audio and text logs to flesh out the Sprawl. The focus on Isaac's mental state was frequently cited as the strongest part of the narrative.

Parkin called the sound design "second to none", and Reiner gave praise to both the sound design and the soundtrack for emphasising the horror atmosphere. Petit cited the sound design as a key part of the experience. Speaking of the audio design, GameTrailers praised its implementation and design, but calling the soundtrack "droning". Miller found himself becoming so immersed in the world because of the sound design that he was having trouble distinguishing real-world sounds from those in Dead Space 2. Jastrzab felt that both the sound and music of Dead Space 2 should be placed among the best in games overall.

Nguyen positively noted the level design and visual spectacle of the set piece scenarios. Edge referred to the visual design as "nothing short of brilliant" and praised the use of lighting when communicating the horror elements, Parkin enjoyed the greater variety of environments alongside the design of the set piece sequences. Reiner felt the new setting of the Sprawl evoked more unsettling horror than the abandoned ship of the original game, additionally praising the graphical detail. Petit praised the diversity of environments, saying the altered pacing and environment helped give the game its own identity. Reyes gave general praise to the visual design of the Sprawl, while Gametrailers lauded the increase in graphical quality and environmental variety between the first and second games. Stapleton positively noted the visual variety of levels, and Jastrzab felt the graphics had improved slightly over the first game and the visual design was utilized better.

Nguyen enjoyed the improvements to Isaac's movement and found the gameplay solid, but faulted the later sections for repetitive combat scenarios and having generic mission objectives. Robinson praised the handling of action without diluting the survival horror elements, and positively noted the incorporation of dedicated cinematic sequences with their own mechanics. Edge positively cited the introductions of new enemies and weapons as not disrupting the established gameplay balance, but faulted the game's pace during later sections relying on waves of enemies. Parkin enjoyed the increased pace of Isaac's character growth and the tension created by the aggressive enemy types, with his main complaint being the number of quick time events used during some sections. Reiner felt some of the spawn points were unfair due to Isaac's lack of defences against attacks from behind, but otherwise praised the gameplay tension and variety of weapons and enemies. Petit enjoyed the gameplay, but found the single-player structure predictable after a time, impacting both gameplay and story. GameTrailers enjoyed the gameplay, positively noting improvements to its design and balance over the first game, but noting a lack of enemy variety and reused encounters and scare tactics. Miller lauded the gameplay as an improvement over the original in its control and speed, additionally praising the lack of backtracking and unlockable extras. Reyes called the gameplay the real star of the experience, praising its improved pacing and mechanics while noting Necromorph spawn points growing predictable over time. Stapleton generally called the gameplay and improvement over the original despite some remaining frustrations with the lack of autosaving, and Jastrzab noted the gameplay remained solid despite a shift towards action and cinematic sequences over horror-based gameplay. The multiplayer split opinion; some called it an enjoyable if shallow bonus to the single-player campaign, while others found it disappointing or lacking compared to the single-player campaign.

The DLC campaign Severed met with "mixed or average" reviews, with Metacritic scoring it with 65 out of 100 on PS3 and 57 out of 100 on 360. Anthony Gallegos of IGN praised the more action-focused combat related to Weller's character and profession, but missed the puzzle sections and felt a lack of connection to Weller despite enjoying the DLC as a fun if short extension of the game world. Petit praised the pace of gameplay and felt the sound and graphics were equal to the original, but disliked the recycling of environments from the main game and found the story uninteresting.

=== Eye surgery scene ===
A screenshot of an in-game sequence of Isaac Clarke receiving eye surgery from a machine

Near the end of the game, Isaac Clarke is instructed by a Nicole hallucination to utilize the "Noonlight Diagnostic Machine," which he uses to physically extract information stored in the human brain by the Marker objects including instructions to destroy them. In a brief cutscene, the machine straps Clarke in and subjects him to an eye laser surgery process involving a long and thin needle that is lowered into one of his eyes to puncture the lateral geniculate nucleus of his brain. As Isaac starts to display anxiety, the player retakes control of the protagonist and is required to carefully lower the needle into his eye by lining up the laser in the correct position. If the player either improperly aligns the laser or allows Isaac's heartbeat to reach high levels, the machine malfunctions, jamming through Isaac's eye and gutting him as he screams. Should the player succeed, the needle will gently pierce the iris up to the brain, causing slight amounts of eye fluids and blood to spill. In an interview with Polygon, Dead Space 2 director Wright Bagwell stated that he intended for the "eye-poke scene" to immerse and horrify players as they realized what they had to do for the "minigame," making the player's anxiety reflect Clarke's. He noted that the segment was the only gameplay feature he worked on that did not "start off feeling kind of lame or silly or that kind of thing".

The eye surgery segment has been noted by authors of multiple publications as an iconic and infamous moment of the Dead Space series. Neil Bolt, writing for Dread Central, considered the "stressful and gross" scene to be a fulfillment of "every fear you might have had about it in the bluntest and most brutal way possible". Carlos Zotomayor of Game Rant considered the scene one of the tensest series moments, highlighting the lack of in-game music and heartbeat monitor for Isaac Clarke as increasing the player's tension to succeed in their task. He gave praise to the player's tension being raised by "allowing players to control the machine that decides his fate". Ariella Zimbler of Screen Rant applauded the segment for "letting anxiety and tension slowly set in" to the player instead of utilizing any jumpscare. SVG writer Helen A. Lee called the machine surgery "[p]otentially one of the most cringe-inducing sights in video game history," stating that the sequence stands out to players for both the gruesome death of the protagonist should the player fail the minigame and for generally "look[ing] so freaking painful". Jonathan Beach of Vice, on the other hand, criticized the failure cutscene for being "over the top" and instead considered the success cutscene to be more disturbing to the point of being unable to rewatch it.

=== Sales ===
Electronic Arts reported that Dead Space 2 shipped nearly 2 million units in the first week of its release. According to Electronic Arts chief financial officer Eric Brown, the game was outselling the original at a ratio of two to one. In the United States during January, Dead Space 2 was the third best-selling game of the month behind Call of Duty: Black Ops and Just Dance 2 for the Wii. The following month it was still in the top ten best-selling games, though it fell to fifth place. In the United Kingdom, Dead Space 2 reached the top of multiplatform sales charts, with the 360 version seeing the largest share of sales, followed by the PS3 and PC. Speaking in 2017, Wilson said the game ultimately sold four million units worldwide, but the combined marketing and production budget together with fees to Microsoft and Sony meant Electronic Arts considered it a commercial failure. Milham and Wanat, speaking in a 2018 retrospective on the series, said it sold similar numbers to the first game while costing more to make.

=== Awards ===
During the 15th Annual Interactive Achievement Awards (now known as the D.I.C.E. Awards), the Academy of Interactive Arts & Sciences nominated Dead Space 2 for "Action Game of the Year". At that year's National Academy of Video Game Trade Reviewers award ceremony, the game was nominated in seven categories, winning in the "Camera Direction in a Game Engine" category. The other nominates were in the "Animation", "Control Precision", "Direction in a Game Cinema", "Lighting/Texturing", "Sound Effects" and "Use of Sound in a Franchise" categories. It was nominated in the "Audio Achievement" category at the 8th British Academy Games Awards. At the 2012 Game Developers Choice Awards, the title was nominated for in the "Best Audio" category. At that year's Game Audio Network Guild Awards, it was nominated in the "Audio of the Year" and "Best Interactive Score", and "Best Original Soundtrack Album" categories.

== Sequel ==
Following Dead Space 2, Electronic Arts wanted to garner additional sales for the series. To this end, Visceral Games ended up incorporating a number of elements into the next game Dead Space 3 due to external pressure, including cooperative multiplayer, an increased focus on action over horror, and microtransactions. Wanat returned as director, Woldman as producer, and Graves continued as a composer. It was intended to close out the series. Releasing worldwide in 2013, Dead Space 3 released to low sales, with the team ultimately disbanding onto other projects before Visceral Games was closed down in 2017.
