= Dead Space: Aftermath =

- DVD cover art
- Directed by: Mike Disa
- Written by: Brandon Auman; Mike Disa; Chuck Beaver; Joe Goyette
- Based on: Dead Space by Electronic Arts
- Produced by: Joe Goyette; Ellen Goldsmith-Vein
- Starring: Gwendoline Yeo; Christopher Judge; Peter Woodward; Ricardo Chavira; Curt Cornelius; Kim Mai Guest
- Edited by: Steven Fahey
- Music by: Christopher Tin
- Production companies: Starz Media; Film Roman; Pumpkin Studio; Electronic Arts; Visceral Games
- Distributed by: Anchor Bay Entertainment; Manga Entertainment
- Release date: January 25, 2011
- Running time: 90 minutes
- Country: United States
- Language: English

Dead Space: Aftermath is a 2011 American adult animated psychological science fiction horror film directed by Mike Disa, written by a team including Brandon Auman, and developed by Starz Media Film Roman and Pumpkin Studio under the supervision of Electronic Arts & Visceral Games. It was released direct-to-video on January 25, the same day as the 2011 survival horror video game Dead Space 2, published by Electronic Arts.

The movie serves as a prequel to Dead Space 2. The story follows the interrogation of four survivors from the USG O'Bannon, who were sent to the remains of the planet Aegis VII to investigate the fate of its colony, discovering a fragment of an artifact called the Marker which triggers an outbreak of reanimated mutated corpses dubbed "Necromorphs".

Film Roman, which had previously collaborated on the production of Dead Space: Downfall, wanted to create a prequel with a narrative based on the Akira Kurosawa film Rashomon, showing the same event from multiple perspectives. To reflect the different narrative timelines, different animation styles were adopted, with Film Roman partnering with multiple South Korean animation studios to head each flashback sequence. Multiple staff members had previously worked on Dante's Inferno: An Animated Epic. Reception of the film was mixed, with many criticizing its niche appeal and animation quality.

== Synopsis ==
Before the events of Dead Space, a planet mining colony funded by the Church of Unitology identified a Marker, an object sacred to the Unitologists' beliefs, on the planet Aegis VII. The Marker is a human copy of an alien object that has a fatal influence over the Aegis VII colony and the mining ship USG Ishimura, eventually causing an outbreak of reanimated mutated corpses referred to as "Necromorphs".

Aftermath is set in 2509, between the events of Dead Space, and Dead Space 2.

The USG O'Bannon was sent to investigate Aegis VII. After contact is lost with the ship, EarthGov sends another ship, which recovers four survivors; security officer Nicholas Kuttner, engineer Alejandro Borgas, chief science officer Nolan Stross, and chief medical officer Isabella Cho. En route to the EarthGov base at Titan Sprawl, each survivor gives their account, with EarthGov gathering intelligence for their own Marker project.

Kuttner led a team to stabilise Aegis VII's failing gravity. There they found fragments of the Marker, which were worth a lot of money. Touching a fragment caused Kuttner to have a psychotic episode and see visions of his deceased daughter. Before he could be restrained, he damaged the gravity stabiliser. After giving his account, Kuttner escapes and has another hallucination which leads him into space, where he dies.

Borgas's story reveals that the team failed to fix the stabilizer, and abandoned Aegis VII as it disintegrated, bringing back both the Marker shard and salvaged corpses from the Ishimura. Aegis VII's destruction damaged the drive and killed several crew members. While he is unaffected by the Marker, Borgas knows too much and is executed after the interrogation.

While studying its effects on corpses, Stross fell under the Marker's influence and unwittingly unleashed a Necromorph outbreak on the O'Bannon. When he went to protect his family, he suffered a hallucination that made him think they were Necromorphs, which caused him to kill them instead. Stross is kept alive so EarthGov can study the Marker's impact on his mind.

Cho's account reveals that she freed Kuttner to help fight off the Necromorphs, and partnering with Stross and Borgas they decided to throw the Marker shard into the ship's drive, hoping to both destroy it and jump-start the ship. By the time they reached the drive room, they were the only surviving crew members. Despite Stross' attempt to stop her, Cho threw the Marker shard into the ship's drive, causing a shockwave which disintegrated the Necromorphs but left the ship stranded. Now having arrived at the Sprawl, Cho deduces EarthGov's intentions of recreating the Marker.

When offered the chance to join the project, Cho refuses. She is lobotomised and framed as a terrorist responsible for the events on Aegis VII, the Ishimura, and the O'Bannon. Stross is held in an EarthGov asylum alongside series protagonist Isaac Clarke.

== Characters and Voice Cast ==
Character	Voice actor
Isabella Cho	Gwendoline Yeo
Nickolas Kuttner	Christopher Judge
Alejandro Borges	Ricardo Chavira
Nolan Stross	Curt Cornelius
Lead Interrogator	Peter Woodward
Lana	Kim Mai Guest

== Production ==
Dead Space: Aftermath forms part of the Dead Space series, described at the time by publisher Electronic Arts as a "trans-media franchise". The movie, together with the video game spin-off Dead Space Ignition and multiple pieces of print media, formed part of Electronic Arts's push to expand the narrative and reach of Dead Space. It also specifically formed part of the marketing push for Dead Space 2. Speaking about the contrasting merits of game and film narrative, the game's producer Steve Papoutsis stated that they were able to go in depth on elements that would otherwise be left unexplained. According to Papoutsis, the development team were "excited" to see the Dead Space series continue to feature in media expansions. The film was co-produced by Starz Media's animation subsidiary Film Roman, who handled Dead Space: Downfall; animation studio Pumpkin Studio; and Electronic Arts, acting as supervisor. The different flashback sections were handled by multiple South Korean studios, providing the desired variety. The studios were Dong Woo Animation, Digiart Productions, FX Gear and JM Animation. Both Dong Woo Animation and JM Animation had worked with Film Roman on the earlier animated feature Dante's Inferno: An Animated Epic.

Director Mike Disa described the goal of Aftermath as creating "the most disturbing, terrifying horror movie we can make". The story delivery was directly influenced by the Akira Kurosawa film Rashomon, which delivered its story in a series of conflicting flashbacks. This approach also allowed the team to fulfil their wish of creating each perspective using a different animation style; the present day sections used 3D CGI, while the flashbacks used different 2D animation techniques. The different animation styles allow for a combination of multiple distinct visual styles, but the team also needed to retain some consistency in character appearance. Disa handled this by having each character have key traits, such as outfits or skin and hair colour, which carried over from sequence to sequence. Each section was created using a different style, focusing individually on a ghost story, pure action, psychological horror and a "monsterfest". The use of multiple studios also allowed the film's production in a shorter time than if it had all been handled by one studio.

The script was written by a team led by Brandon Auman, who had also scripted Dante's Inferno: An Animated Epic. Auman's specific influences when writing the script ranged across a wide area, including multiple darkly-themed movies such as Alien, Pi and Blade Runner. So as to remain faithful to the series narrative, Auman read both the series bible and the script for Dead Space 2. The narrative allowed the wider conspiracy within the Dead Space universe to be revealed to the audience in detail. Part of the title's promotion focused on the high-profile voice cast brought in on the project. Judge needed to portray the character Kuttner with both physical strength and inner vulnerability, while Chavira provided a lighter contrast with Borgas. Yeo provided a "deft touch" to Cho's transformation through the narrative into a lead heroine archetype. Cornelius's part was to portray Stross's descent from analytical scientist into lunatic; Cornelius would reprise his role in Dead Space 2. Woodward "nailed" the portrayal of the Lead Interrogator as a cold and calculating figure from the first day of recording. The music was composed by Christopher Tin; it was his third collaboration with Disa and his second project for Electronic Arts, having previously scored Dante's Inferno: An Animated Epic. Tin was brought on board the project by Disa. Tin was requested to compose music in the style of series composer Jason Graves. The score made use of tone clusters, extended technique, and aleatoric elements.

The film was announced at the 2008 San Diego Comic-Con, originally planned for a late 2010 release. Aftermath was released on January 25, 2011, the same date as Dead Space 2. It was released direct-to-video on DVD and Blu-ray by Anchor Bay Entertainment and Manga Entertainment. A double pack containing Aftermath and Downfall released alongside them. It debuted for television on Hulu on October 9 of the same year.

== Reception ==
IGN's Greg Miller was fairly positive about Aftermath, calling it an improvement over Downfall; he praised the storytelling, its expansion of plot threads left hanging in Dead Space 2, contrasting animation styles, and its lack of unnecessary lore exposition. His main complaint was a lack of special features on the disc. Justin Felix of DVDTalk felt there was little fresh that the film offered when compared to Downfall, and disliked the shifting animation styles. He concluded that "taken on its own, it seems perfunctory at best". He also faulted the lack of extras.

Alex Lucard, writing for DieHard GameFan, said it was a film only for established fans of the series, and noted a lack of character personality and inconsistent animation quality that would turn away casual viewers. Conrad Zimmerman of Destructoid, commenting on the film in regards to a behind-the-scenes feature describing its goals, found fault with the changes in some character designs despite finding the effect worked overall. Play, as part of an article on Dead Space 3, said the film was less fun than Downfall despite still providing "decent brain-off (violent) enjoyment".
