= Dead Space: Downfall =

- DVD cover
- Directed by: Chuck Patton
- Written by: Justin Gray; Jimmy Palmiotti
- Based on: Dead Space by Electronic Arts
- Produced by: Joe Goyette; Robert Weaver; Ellen Goldsmith-Vein
- Starring: Nika Futterman; Bruce Boxleitner; Keith Szarabajka; Jim Cummings; Hal Sparks; Kevin Michael Richardson; Phil Morris; Lia Sargent
- Edited by: John Hoyos
- Music by: Seth Podowitz
- Production companies: Starz Media; Film Roman; Electronic Arts
- Distributed by: Anchor Bay Entertainment; Manga Entertainment
- Release date: October 28, 2008
- Running time: 75 minutes
- Country: United States
- Language: English

Dead Space: Downfall is a 2008 American adult animated psychological science fiction horror film directed by Chuck Patton, written by Justin Gray and Jimmy Palmiotti and developed by Film Roman under the supervision of Electronic Arts; Electronic Arts also published the 2008 survival horror video game Dead Space upon which the film is based. It first released direct-to-video in October, before seeing a television showing the following month on Starz Encore.

Downfall is a prequel to Dead Space, taking place after the limited comic series. Set aboard the planet mining ship USG Ishimura, it details the events following the transportation of an artifact called the Marker from the planet Aegis VII, leading to the deaths of nearly everyone on board at the hands of reanimated mutated corpses dubbed "Necromorphs".

The film was produced as part of Electronic Art's multimedia expansion of the plot, referred to by staff as "IP cubed". Patton was given relative freedom with the narrative and visuals, wanting to create the goriest feature Film Roman had produced. Electronic Arts provided art assets to Film Roman, allowing an accurate representation of the game's universe. The DVD release earned over $1 million in sales. Reviews were mixed, with praise for its voice acting, writing and animation, but criticism for its short length and emphasis on graphic violence over horror and suspense. Electronic Arts and Film Roman would collaborate again on 2011's Dead Space: Aftermath, a prequel to Dead Space 2.

== Plot ==
Dead Space: Downfall takes place in the year 2508, centuries after humanity narrowly avoided extinction due to resource depletion by "cracking" planets to extract their resources in a three-year process. The story begins during the second year of an illegal mining operation on the planet Aegis VII funded by the Church of Unitology. Colony geologist Jennifer Barrows discovers a monolith-like artifact identified as a Marker, an object sacred to the Unitologists' beliefs. In reality, the Marker is a human copy of an alien object that begins to have a fatal influence over the colony, eventually causing an outbreak of reanimated mutated corpses referred to outside the movie as "Necromorphs". Downfall details how the Marker's infection reached and overcame the Ishimura, told through the eyes of a number of Aegis VII miners and Ishimura crew members.

The film opens in media res with a video message from security chief Alissa Vincent, saying the Ishimura is lost and both the ship and the Marker that caused its fall must be destroyed. The story goes back to Barrows' discovery of the Marker in an area showing signs of ancient human mining. By the time the Ishimura arrives, the Aegis VII colony has undergone a catastrophic breakdown, with dozens killed and many reports of violent behavior and psychosis. The Marker is brought on board on the authority of Captain Mathius and Dr. Kyne, prompting many Unitologist crew to worship it, among them engineer Samuel Irons. Vincent grows increasingly furious about having the Marker on board, believing it was responsible for the colony's collapse.

After planetcrack, all contact is lost with the colony, which is completely overrun by Necromorphs. The now-insane Barrows kills herself, and when her husband escapes with her body to the Ishimura, they are infected by a stowaway Necromorph and escape onto the Ishimura. Kyne, already questioning their real mission to bring the Marker back to the Church, briefly sees the converted Barrows. Vincent's six-person team—including members Ramirez and Hanson—investigate a disturbance, finding growing numbers of Necromorphs killing the crew and overtaking the ship. During their encounters, her team loses two members, and Hanson is only saved by Irons's intervention. Meanwhile Mathius grows increasingly paranoid and delusional, forcing the bridge crew to restrain him. Kyne's attempt to sedate him leads to Mathius's death, and Kyne flees as all escape pods are launched, trapping everyone on board.

En route to the bridge, Hanson goes insane and kills Shen, another member of Vincent's crew, before Ramirez shoots him. In an effort to save survivors, Irons sacrifices himself to hold off the Necromorphs. Vincent and Ramirez then go to stop Kyne deactivating the Ishimura's engines and crashing them into Aegis VII. Ramirez dies during the trek, and Kyne reveals the Marker's influence to Vincent before escaping again. With the Ishimura stable but in a decaying orbit, Vincent reaches the Marker, which the Necromorphs cannot approach as it kept them sealed on Aegis VII. Exhausted and beginning to suffer from hallucinations, Vincent makes her video message, then attempts to escape on a remaining shuttle. Trapped by Necromorphs, she opens the bay doors, sending herself and nearby Necromorphs into space after launching a distress beacon. The film ends with the UGS Kellion responding to the distress call.

== Voice actors ==
Character	Voice actor
Alissa Vincent	Nika Futterman
Dr Kyne	Keith Szarabajka
Samuel Irons	Kevin Michael Richardson
Ramirez	Hal Sparks
Hansen	Phil Morris
Shen	Kelly Hu
Pendleton	Kevin Michael Richardson
Dobbs	Jeff Bennett
Captain Matthius	Jim Cummings
Jennifer Barrow	Lia Sargent
Colin Barrow	Bruce Boxleitner

== Production ==
The survival horror video game Dead Space began production in 2006 at EA Redwood Shores, based on creator Glen Schofield's wish to create the most frightening horror game possible. Alongside the game, the universe of Dead Space was expanded into a multimedia narrative described by its publisher Electronic Arts as "IP cubed"; it extended across the game, the limited comic series Dead Space, and the animated film Downfall. The concept for a film was around from the beginning of the game's production. While each part of the media expansion was handled by different people, the game's development team acted as overall controller, ensuring continuity between each property.

The film was produced by Film Roman, the animation unit of Starz Media known for their work on The Simpsons and King of the Hill. Downfall was directed by Chuck Patton, known for his work on Todd McFarlane's Spawn. From the outset, Patton wanted Downfall to be the goriest animated feature the studio had done up to this point. Producer Joe Goyette described this element as "creating another 400 ways to kill people". The team opted for traditional 2D animation both for time and budgetary reasons, and to craft more sympathetic characters. Due to the simultaneous production of the game and movie, there was a lot of collaboration between the two teams. The "Downfall" subtitle was a reference to the film's content. While the different media projects shared a dark and grim aesthetic, Electronic Arts did not try to keep the art design consistent between them.

While the mythology and broad strokes of plot were in place, the plot details of Downfall were left up to Film Roman as long as they did not deviate from the established lore and timeline. So the film would be accurate to the game, the production team were given 3D assets from the game by Electronic Arts, along with reference material for the atmosphere and Necromorph transformations. The team got further reference material for themselves to portray the injuries and transformations. The film was co-written by Justin Gray and Jimmy Palmiotti in collaboration with the animation team. For Gray and Palmiotti, the film gave them a chance to let loose with the level of violence and vent their frustration at being told to hold back in their earlier work. While the events of the comic and the game were set, and one character had to survive the film, the writers were otherwise allowed to "write madness". According to the writers and director, the amount of content cut during production would have made a sequel. A notable cut section, which was seen as overly ambitious and requiring too much time, was a fight between Vincent and a unique Necromorph born from the fused bodies of her squad mates.

Downfall was first announced in March 2008. It premiered in the United Kingdom at the 2008 Sci-Fi-London film festival. The movie was released direct-to-video on DVD and Blu-ray on October 28, roughly a week after the release of Dead Space. The extras included an isolated soundtrack, a deleted scene, and cheat codes for the game. The Blu-ray edition also included a standard DVD edition and digital editions compatible with PlayStation Portable and Microsoft Windows. It was co-published by Anchor Bay Entertainment and Manga Entertainment. It later premiered on television through Starz Encore on November 2. Electronic Arts and Starz Media would collaborate again on Dead Space: Aftermath, released in 2011 as a prequel to Dead Space 2.

== Critical reception ==
Upon its debut in the United States, the DVD release reached twenty-third place in sales charts, reaching over 26,500 units and earning over $397,000. Ultimately, Downfall earned over $1,655,000 in DVD sales.

Christopher Monfette of IGN enjoyed the animation and staging of its scares and violence despite a limited color palette, but found the narrative was poorly paced with too many events happening in quick succession. He also faulted the dialogue and performances, and the Unitology subplot as unnecessary filler. Joystiq's Andrew Yoon felt that the movie was only for fans of the game, as its storyline was best understood by those who had already played Dead Space. Alongside this, Yoon faulted the characters, lack of reference to in-game events, and overfast pacing; ultimately, he felt it was better than bigger-budget Hollywood game adaptations. James Stephanie Sterling writing for Destructoid, said that the movie was enjoyable but relied too much on character cliches. She positively compared its tone and violence to "a cartoony Event Horizon", and praised the animation quality despite it clashing with the parent game's realistic graphics.

Peter Debruge of Variety noted its technical achievements given its scale and market, but noted that its tone and apparent revelry in the deaths of its cast made it unenjoyable outside the original game's context. DVDTalk's Adam Tyner felt that Downfall would have been better if it had focused on horror and suspence over violence and gore. He summarised that the film "captures the unflinchingly graphic violence of EA's survival horror video game, but it misses out on the suspense and intensity that leave it standing out as one of the year's best". Michael Thompson of Ars Technica again noted it as better than many larger-budget video game adaptations, citing Max Payne as an example of the latter. His biggest complaint was a lack of horror elements, with the focus on bloody violence undercuting any suspense. Play, as part of an article on Dead Space 3, called Downfall "Gory, quite silly, but good for fans and entertaining."

In July 2021, the Oktyabrsky District Court in Saint Petersburg banned the film along with some Happy Tree Friends, films based on anime.
