= Necromorphs =

Fictional undead creatures in Dead Space

Necromorph
- Dead Space race
- Illustration of a Necromorph creature on the cover of Dead Space #1 (March 2008) by Ben Templesmith
- First appearance: Dead Space #1 (2008)
- Last appearance: Dead Space (2023)
- Created by: Glen Schofield
- Genre: Survival horror

In-universe information
- Base of operations: USG Ishimura
- Type: Undead

Necromorphs are a collective of undead creatures in the science fiction horror multimedia franchise Dead Space by Electronic Arts, introduced in the 2008 comic book series of the same name. Within the series, the Necromorphs are constructed from reanimated corpses and come in multiple forms of various shapes and sizes. They are violent creatures driven to murder and infect all life within their vicinity by a signal emitted from mysterious alien artifacts known as Markers.

The Necromorphs' creation and design were led by Ben Wanat, who served as production designer on the first Dead Space and creative director of Dead Space 3; though the team did not initially settle on the Necromorphs as the main antagonistic threat. Wanat's wife came up with the term "Necromorph" at a whim later in the development of the original Dead Space. The team found it useful as an internal reference but decided to limit its usage to a minimum as it does not match the serious tone of the video games series' narrative.

The artistic direction on the various strains of distorted Necromorph monsters drew inspiration from seminal works such as System Shock, Resident Evil 4, and John Carpenter's The Thing. The Necromorphs are intended to instill a sense of unease from the player's fleeting glimpses of their former humanity, though later games introduce other variants made from non-human biomass like dogs and alien lifeforms. Each Necromorph form is intended to have an improvised aesthetic, with body organs crudely repurposed or modified to increase its capacity for grievous bodily harm of its victims. For example, a Necromorph form may have bone shards that have broken into teeth-like protrusions which are not literally teeth or possess wings which are organs that have been bent backwards and stretched.

The design process involved with creating a diverse variety of Necromorph forms posed some unique challenges for the team, with some forms requiring a redesign in order to function practically within certain levels and environments. The limitations of the in-game engine also presented a major influence over the design process, requiring team members to come up with solutions which work around these restrictions or discard certain Necromorph monster concepts altogether. The audio design of the Necromorphs, which involves a layering technique that combines human and animal sounds, is an important element of their portrayal as horror-themed antagonists. A staple antagonistic force across all franchise media, the Necromorphs of Dead Space have been recognized by critics as one of the most influential and memorable video game depictions of horror themes.

== Characteristics ==
The Necromorphs first appear in the 2008 Dead Space comic book series, the inaugural release of the multimedia Dead Space franchise which was published between March and August 2008. They are highly aggressive reanimated undead creatures which originate from the strange powers exhibited by alien artifacts, known as the Markers, emitted through signals that cause paranoia and hallucinations to living beings in its vicinity. The signals also lead beings to engage in strange behavior or violently attack each other. Upon their deaths, their corpses are reconstituted or repurposed by the Marker signal, then broken and twisted into something else in a violent improvisational manner. The Slasher is one of the most recognizable Necromorph forms. Their arms are appendages with blade-like protrusions that they use to attack their victims. A dead host's skeletal system is reconfigured to focus its bone structure for an offense.

The 2008 Dead Space title introduced several Necromorph forms. Notable examples include Leapers, capable of jumping great distances with their powerful tail-like appendage; the Lurker, mutated human infants who crawl along walls and produce three long tendrils capable of shooting projectiles at the player character; the Brute, a large Necromorph form composed of multiple human corpses; and the Spitter, which could deliver charged attacks from long distances. A gigantic Necromorph form, known as the Hive Mind, is portrayed as being capable of telepathically commanding other Necromorphs within its vicinity and is encountered as the final boss of the first Dead Space.

Subsequent sequels and entries in other media have explored the Necromorphs' origins and introduced further new or variations of Necromorph forms. Dead Space 2 introduced forms such as the Pack, children who are twisted into horrific forms, and the Puker, which vomits a short range, acidic projectile as an offensive ability. It also introduced a multiplayer mode where players could assume the role of various Necromorph forms in player versus player team battles between human and Necromorph forces. In Dead Space 3, Necromorph forms reconstituted from mummified human remains or a long-extinct alien species are also introduced, the Feeder, based on wendigo, which Feeders are a necromorph created when a human consumes Necromorph flesh, along with the redesign of creatures such as the Lurkers, which are now based on dogs as opposed to infants. Dead Space 3 reveals that the Necromorphs are part of a life cycle that culminates in the completion of a "Convergence" event and the formation of colossal space-faring entities known as Brethren Moons, the true source of the Marker signals.

An essential gameplay element of combat scenarios involving the Necromorphs is the "strategic limb dismemberment" mechanic. To halt their advancement and properly eliminate most Necromorph forms, the player must utilize a handheld mining tool modified into an improvised weapon, known as the Plasma Cutter, to completely cut off the limbs, heads, or other protruding features of a Necromorph.

== Concept and design ==
Designer Ben Wanat was primarily responsible for the concept and design of the Necromorphs. Wanat and his team at EA Redwood Shores, who were rebranded to Visceral Games in 2009, commenced production on their basic concept in January 2006 and finalized their work 18 months later. Wanat recalled that his team planned for the introduction of enemy archetypes from a design perspective early in development, with the first Leaper and Slasher concepts ready within the first two to three months. It was important for Wanat and his team that the Necromorphs' design aesthetics reflected an adequate "glimmer of their former human self" visually; the goal was not to create something that is gross for its own sake but to make players feel a sense of fear and revulsion.

"It's not like you're getting attacked and your limbs are getting hacked off of your friends and you're like, 'Everybody stay away from the—what are they going to call these things... Necromorphs! Stay away from the Necromorphs!' You know, it's just ridiculous."

— Ben Wanat, "Monster of the Week: The Godfather of the Necromorph on Creating Dead Space's Famous Creature"

Wanat's wife came up with the term "Necromorph" to describe the undead antagonists of the Dead Space series after she perused the creatures' conceptual designs and thought they were alien forms made out of corpses. The composite morphemes necro- (from νεκρός, nekrós) and -morph (from μορφόω, morphóō), of Greek origin, mean 'death' and 'to change' respectively. The team considered "Necromorph" to be an appropriate out-of-universe name for the creatures and congruent with series lore but not a term characters within the Dead Space universe would say to other characters in dialog or for the player's reference. Wanat explained that the name sounds silly to him and the rest of the team when it is said out loud, and a conscious decision was made by the team to minimize the use of the term within the fiction of the franchise itself.

The 1982 horror film The Thing and the depiction of zombies in the Resident Evil franchise are important influences for the primary antagonists of the Dead Space. However, the art director of Dead Space 2, Ian Milham, said the biology of parasitic fungus left the biggest impact on the creatures' design process and compared the contents of a mycology textbook to that of a horror novel. In his view, fungi are horrific both in their appearance and how they spread, representing an "organic and otherworldly" feel that he wanted to evoke as the basis of the Necromorph corruption. Milham said the spread of Necromorph infection is similar in nature to that of typical parasitic fungus, in that the sparse surface-level manifestations of a seemingly isolated Necromorph outbreak are in fact a "small part of a much bigger, sometimes vast, network of strands", connected together on a galactic scale and "taking over anything and everything it comes across."

Concept art illustration of three variants of the Slasher, the most common Necromorph form in the Dead Space franchise

The team's creative vision is that there is an "improvised terribleness" behind the creation of each Necromorph forms from available corpses. The idea was that the infection has an insidious notion behind what the body needs to become but is unable to mold it into that vision and thus makes do with what the raw biomass has to offer. A major aspect of the team's research for the Necromorphs' visual design involved the collection of medical, autopsy, and accident photos, which were kept in an office folder labeled "body trauma". In an effort to study and reimagine how the individual body parts could be rearranged into something horrific, the team realized that the more they made the Necromorphs "look like normal people who went through something terrible, the deeper the emotional impact." The Slashers in particular became more human-looking compared to initial designs in later iterations; recognizing the need for more variety with the Slashers' look, Wanat attempted to come up with new ways to differentiate each design variant and allow them to feel unique. From their research, the designers came up with grotesque features based on actual human anatomy: a signature hook for each individual form may include bat-like wings, large bladed arms, or tentacles that spit spikes, but all of the hideous add-ons are based on actual human anatomy. For coloration, Milham explained that the designers drew from a combination of hues humanity would associate with infection and bodily organs, such as olive green, ochre, purple, and off-white.

The first game's derelict spaceship setting and the variety of creature designs conceived by the artistic team led to the creation of a diverse range of levels for the player to encounter and engage the Necromorphs. This necessitates the constant refinement of the enemy 3D models over time, as well as the redesign of individual Necromorph types to enable their character models to interact effectively with their environment. As an example, the Leapers are presented as a low, horizontal target which took up a significant amount of space on the floor. From the initial design of a fairly large creature composed of multiple bodies, the Leaper was downsized to a smaller, simpler design based on the upper torso of a single human body to allow the character model easier access to navigate spaces within in-game levels. Other creatures have different needs: the Lurker needed flat walls to pathfind along, whereas Slashers needed to be able to pass around one another to reach the player character.

According to Wanat, a primary concern for most Necromorph units is that they need to be able to pass through doorways, which influenced how tight the team could design corridors as well as the methods they used to depict level spaces to feel more claustrophobic. A traditional game design method employed by the developers are "kill doors", which only open once the player has eliminated all enemies in the immediate area. The incorporation of a ventilation shaft system, which provides alternative routes for the AI-controlled Necromorphs to reroute and regroup without forcing the developers to build additional space in the level to accommodate them, is an important solution that circumnavigates the limitations posed by the environment. The shafts fulfill an additional goal of adding tension to the survival horror driven gameplay by serving as "monster closets"; the Necromorphs could jump scare players anytime and anywhere, especially when they pass by ventilation shaft openings.

Design work on the Necromorphs further evolved in subsequent sequels, with other designers besides Wanat in an expanded development team contributing their own ideas to create fresh content, such as new Necromorph forms. Wanat noted that the new settings introduced in the Dead Space sequels influenced the design for each iteration of the Necromorphs and provided a different "flavor". For example, a tall monster that uses its tongue to choke the player character and replaces his head with its own was described by Wanat as a "cool, bizarre but uniquely Necromorphy sort of thing that they could do."

The team identified strategic dismemberment as a core solution for the Necromorph threat early in development, with the result that it became an informing element to all relevant concepts surrounding the Necromorphs. In Wanat's view, players ought to approach strategic dismemberment in combat scenarios like a brain teaser: for example, Slashers are intentionally designed with long arms that extend above their head to create opportunities for players. If the player opts to disable the Slasher's legs, the creature presents a different challenge compared to what would occur if it was beheaded or literally disarmed. Because of the core design philosophy surrounding strategic dismemberment, the player character's plasma cutter weapon never loses effectiveness even when newer Necromorph forms or weapon types are introduced, as players could respond to changing circumstances on the spot by rotating the cutter's barrel to aim more effectively at the enemy's limbs.

A fourth main series title for Dead Space was planned by Visceral Studios but never realized following its closure. Wanat noted that the Necromorphs were intended to be a bigger threat in zero gravity environments for the canceled sequel. He suggested that a new enemy type would have the capability of snaking through zero gravity corridors and propelling itself in open space to grapple with the player. Wanat retained a significant amount of early concept art work for the Necromorphs, which he continued to catalogue on his ArtStation portfolio following his departure from Electronic Arts. Reflecting on the development process behind the Necromorphs, conceptually otherworldly entities with a fantastical nature but designed to be as "real and grounded and believable as possible", Wanat expressed a hope that the Necromorphs would stand the test of time as a memorable and unique archetype in horror fiction.

For the 2023 remake of the original Dead Space, Necromorphs have bones underneath limbs which players must blast with precision in order to complete the dismemberment, otherwise the limb would be left dangling if a small amount of flesh is left on the wound. Necromorphs have multiple layers of defense for players to deal with, such as flesh that peels away as they are struck with high-damage, low-precision weapons or bits of clothing and body armour that players must take into consideration. This is intended to help indicate what the player's attacks are doing even when they are not actively aiming for dismemberment of their limbs.

=== Sound ===
Don Veca, who had the position of audio director at Visceral Games, was responsible for the audio design of the Necromorphs. According to Veca, refining the sound design and foley for each Necromorph form took "weeks of planning and iteration". To create a "truly terrifying" aural experience with the Necromorphs, Veca took inspiration from sounds made by real life wild animals, which from a scientific perspective conveys subconscious messages to humanity's primal instincts in preparation for imminent danger. He paid particular attention to recordings of animals which make "freaky sounds" when subjected to "unique situations". The final product is created by layering and interweaving pieces of noises made by up to five or six different animals, twisted to sound unrecognizable yet familiar in a subtle way.

Using the diminutive Lurkers as an example of his creative process for Necromorph sounds, Veca noted that the designers wanted the Lurkers to sound childlike yet mean and menacing at the same time. To achieve this, Veca used a toddler's sounds carefully layered with a mixture of intimidating sounds made by leopards and lion. Referencing a Lurker sound sample included in an article published by Game Informer, Veca explained that the first few hundred milliseconds of the vocalization is a "cute" baby coo, which cross-fades into a mix of a leopard's roar and child's scream. The sound ends by cross-fading into a lower lion growl as well as a minute amount of processing on some of the other elements.

=== Cut content ===
Some preliminary Necromorph concepts were discarded early in the development of the Dead Space intellectual property because they looked too much like a highly evolved organism, which does not fit into the creative vision of the franchise. Other Necromorph forms saw actual development but were ultimately cut prior to the completion of individual titles due to technological limitations or unsatisfactory implementation during game testing. Monster concepts that were discarded due to technical constraints included the Flier, which was meant to be a recurring flying enemy type in zero gravity spaces that would crawl on walls after its wings were disabled, and a conjoined pair of monsters called the Tentacle Slinger, which could work together to confront the player even after they are severed in two.

In December 2009, Game Informer published an article that explores the thought process behind the concept of an unused Necromorph form known as the "Flytrap". According to Milham, the Flytrap was an attempt by the development team to introduce an enemy type which serves as "half environmental hazard and half enemy" that would travel along the ceiling and dangle down to snare the player character using a lure. Its intended role was to slow players down and immerse them into a world that is "organic and logical".

== Reception ==
The Necromorphs have been unanimously acclaimed by critics as a landmark depiction of horror themes within the video game industry. Caty McCarthy of website USGamer described the Necromorphs as a revolting yet memorable mixture of the Alien franchise's facehuggers and common tropes from gruesome zombie films. She further wrote that their penchant for emerging from unexpected spaces to ambush the player character is "exhilarating". McCarthy suggested that much of the critical acclaim and fan following of the Dead Space franchise could be credited to the "horrifying levels of Necromorphs that Wanat and other artists at Visceral Games designed over the years" and that they have claimed a corner of their own in history, "not just in the realm of video game horror, but all horror." Tom Power concurred that plenty of the praise the first Dead Space received was due to the effective portrayal of the Necromorphs and that they have been an iconic part of video game culture for over a decade. Game Informer magazine's Tim Turi lauded the Necromorphs as some of the most grotesque enemies he "ever had the pleasure of dismembering in a video game." Ben Reeves, also from Game Informer, praised Veca's effective use of layering familiar sounds to unnerve players and "fool their minds into fear" by exploiting the human subconscious. The Necromorphs have appeared in numerous "top" lists published by sources such as IGN, Paste Magazine and GamesRadar+. Writing for IGN, Jesse Schedeen also described Necromorph as one of his favorite video game monsters of all time, while Phil Hayton of Bloody Disgusting described it as one of the most iconic horror video game enemies of all time.

The opportunity to play as Necromorphs in the asymmetrical multiplayer mode of Dead Space 2 received a more mixed response. Quintin Smith assessed footage of the multiplayer mode's beta phase and found it to be somewhat boring. He criticized the quality of Necromorph animations within the footage and opined that it failed to make a good case for players to play as Necromorphs, as opposed to the "excellent array of weaponry" which could be wielded by human characters. On the other hand, Simon Park assessed the multiplayer mode to be a "slight but focused" experience and praised the tactical respawn options for various Necromorph forms, which differ from each other in power or strength, as an "ingenious system".

== Bibliography ==
- Martin Robinson (2013). The Art of Dead Space. Titan Books. ISBN 978-1-78116-426-6.
