= List of Dead Space media =

Series of media

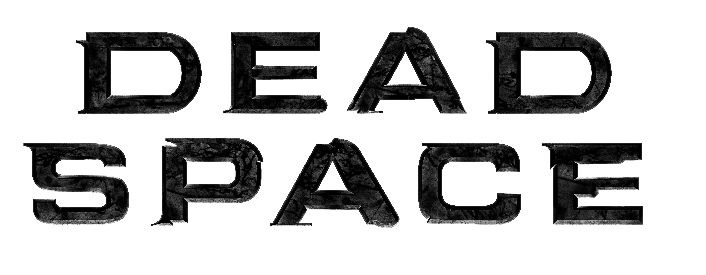

Dead Space is a media franchise created by Glen Schofield. The franchise is focused around a series of survival horror video games, the franchise was produced by Visceral Games (formerly EA Redwood Shores), and published by Electronic Arts from 2008 to 2013. The series began with the titular first title, and was followed by two direct sequels; Dead Space 2 in 2011, and Dead Space 3 in 2013. Following the cancellation of a planned fourth entry, the series remained dormant until the announcement of a remake of the first game.

The series covers three mainline entries released for PlayStation 3, Xbox 360 and Microsoft Windows; and multiple spin-off titles on other platforms co-developed with external studios set before or between the main games. To complement and expand upon the games' narratives, the team and Electronic Arts created a multimedia franchise covering animated movies and printed media, collaborating with several studios and creators. Each of the main games also received soundtrack albums of its music, composed primarily by Jason Graves.

== Video games ==
The original Dead Space began production in 2006 at Visceral Games (then EA Redwood Shores); the aim of creator Glen Schofield was to design the most frightening survival horror experience possible at the time, drawing inspiration from the Resident Evil 4, and a range of movies including Event Horizon and Alien. Following the first game, the series was expanded into a trilogy. The next two entries were Dead Space 2 in 2011, and Dead Space 3 in 2013. The second and third games received single-playing downloadable content (DLC) episodes which expanded upon the narrative. A fourth entry was planned, which would have expanded upon space sections of Dead Space 3 and potentially featured a new protagonist, but it was cancelled and Visceral Games was eventually closed down in 2017. The series remained dormant until the announcement of a remake of the first game in 2021. In addition, to expand upon different narrative elements and diversify on its gameplay, spin-off titles were created in collaboration with other developers.

=== Main entries ===
Main entries
Game	Details
Dead Space Original release dates: NA: October 13, 2008; AU: October 23, 2008; EU: October 24, 2008	Release years by system: 2008 - PlayStation 3, Xbox 360, Microsoft Windows
Dead Space Original release dates: NA: October 13, 2008; AU: October 23, 2008; EU: October 24, 2008	Notes: Windows version released in North America on October 20.
Dead Space 2 Original release dates: NA: January 25, 2011; AU: January 27, 2011; EU: January 28, 2011	Release years by system: 2011 - PlayStation 3, Xbox 360, Microsoft Windows
Dead Space 2 Original release dates: NA: January 25, 2011; AU: January 27, 2011; EU: January 28, 2011	Notes: Series debut of multiplayer, featuring matches between player teams.; DLC episode Severed released on March 1 in North America and Europe, and March 2 in Australia for PS3 and 360.
Dead Space 3 Original release dates: NA: February 5, 2013; AU: February 7, 2013; EU: February 8, 2013	Release years by system: 2013 – PlayStation 3, Xbox 360, Microsoft Windows
Dead Space 3 Original release dates: NA: February 5, 2013; AU: February 7, 2013; EU: February 8, 2013	Notes: Debut of cooperative multiplayer, with two players taking control of the leads during the campaign.; Windows version released in Japan on February 14, 2013.; DLC episode Awakened released on March 12, 2013.

=== Spin-offs ===
Spin-offs
Game	Details
No Known Survivors Original release dates: August 25, 2008 - October 21, 2008	Release years by system: 2008 - Web browser
No Known Survivors Original release dates: August 25, 2008 - October 21, 2008	Notes: An alternate reality game released as a promotion for Dead Space.; Developed by Deep Focus.; Set prior to the main game's events and following two survivors.; Website closed between 2011 and 2012.
Dead Space: Extraction Original release dates: AU: September 24, 2009; EU: September 25, 2009; NA: September 29, 2009	Release years by system: 2009 - Wii; 2011 - PlayStation 3
Dead Space: Extraction Original release dates: AU: September 24, 2009; EU: September 25, 2009; NA: September 29, 2009	Notes: A rail shooter set prior to the events of Dead Space.; Co-developed by Eurocom.; Released in Japan on October 1, 2009.; Ported to PlayStation 3 and released parallel to Dead Space 2 as both a pre-order bonus and a standalone release.
Dead Space Ignition Original release dates: PlayStation 3: October 12, 2010 Xbox 360: October 13, 2010	Release years by system: 2010 - PlayStation 3, Xbox 360
Dead Space Ignition Original release dates: PlayStation 3: October 12, 2010 Xbox 360: October 13, 2010	Notes: An action puzzle video game set prior to Dead Space 2, combining hacking minigames with motion comic-style cutscenes and multiple story paths.; Co-developed by Sumo Digital.
Dead Space (mobile) Original release dates: iOS: January 25, 2011 Android: December 2011	Release years by system: 2011 – iOS, Android
Dead Space (mobile) Original release dates: iOS: January 25, 2011 Android: December 2011	Notes: A mobile adaptation of the main series' gameplay, set prior to Dead Space 2.; Primary development by IronMonkey Studios.; Additional versions compatible with Xperia Play and BlackBerry devices.; All versions shut down as of 2016.

=== Remakes ===
Remakes
Game	Details
Dead Space (2023) Original release dates: January 27, 2023	Release years by system: 2023 - Microsoft Windows, PlayStation 5, Xbox Series X/S
Dead Space (2023) Original release dates: January 27, 2023	Notes: Remake of the original Dead Space.; Developed by Motive Studios.

== Other media ==
Alongside the original video game, the developers and publisher decided to expand the narrative into a comic series of the same name and an animated film which acted as prequels to the game's plot; this approach was described by Electronic Arts as "IP cubed". After the original game's success, Electronic Arts continued to expand upon the series lore using these additional media, now referring to the series as a "trans-media franchise". The writer for much of this material up to 2012 was Anthony Johnston, who had also helped with writing on the original game. The graphic novel Dead Space: Liberation was instead written by Ian Edginton. Illustrations for these projects was handled first by Ben Templesmith, known for his work on 30 Days of Night; and later by Christopher Shy of Studio Ronin. Genre writer B. K. Evenson also penned two prequel novels set centuries before the first game; Dead Space: Martyr in 2010 and Dead Space: Catalyst in 2012. Reports of a feature film adaptation were active between 2009 and 2013, with several people announced as being attached but nothing further being announced.

The series' music was primarily composed by Jason Graves, who drew inspiration from the work of Christopher Young and focusing on blending the music with the game ambience. He evolved his style over the course of the series by incorporating specific character themes, and collaborated on Dead Space 3 with James Hannigan. The movies were scored respectively by Seth Podowitz and Christopher Tin. Each of the three mainline games seeing a soundtrack album release.

=== Films ===
Title	Release date	Studio	Notes	Source
Dead Space: Downfall	October 28, 2008	Film Roman		
Dead Space: Aftermath	January 25, 2011	Film Roman; Punpkin Studio	Additional work by Dong Woo Animation, Digiart Productions, FX Gear and JM Animation.	

=== Printed ===
Title	Release date	Publisher	Author	Source
Dead Space (comic)	March 2008 – September 2008	Image Comics (2008); Titan Books (2013)	Anthony Johnston (writer); Ben Templesmith (art)	
Dead Space: Extraction	September 2009	Image Comics (2009); Titan Books (2013)	Anthony Johnston (writer); Ben Templesmith (art)	
Dead Space: Martyr	July 20, 2010	Tor Books	B. K. Evenson	
Dead Space: Salvage	November 24, 2010	IDW Publishing (2010); Titan Books (2013)	Anthony Johnston (writer); Christopher Shy (art)	
Dead Space: Catalyst	October 2, 2012	Tor Books	B. K. Evenson	
Dead Space: Liberation	February 5, 2013	Titan Books	Ian Edginton (writer); Christopher Shy (art)	
The Art of Dead Space	February 5, 2013	Titan Books		

=== Soundtracks ===
Title	Release date	Length	Label	Source
Dead Space Original Soundtrack	November 11, 2008	1:01:07	Electronic Arts	
Dead Space 2 Original Videogame Score	January 25, 2011	1:00:22	Electronic Arts	
Dead Space 2 Collector's Edition Original Soundtrack	January 25, 2011	1:00:15	Electronic Arts	
Dead Space 3 Original Video Game Score	February 12, 2013	1:23:29	Electronic Arts	

=== Podcasts ===
Title	Release date	Number of Episodes	Producer	Source
Dead Space: Deep Cover	May 4, 2024	9	Cineverse Podcast Network, Bloody Disgusting, and Electronic Arts	
