= Antony Johnston =

British writer

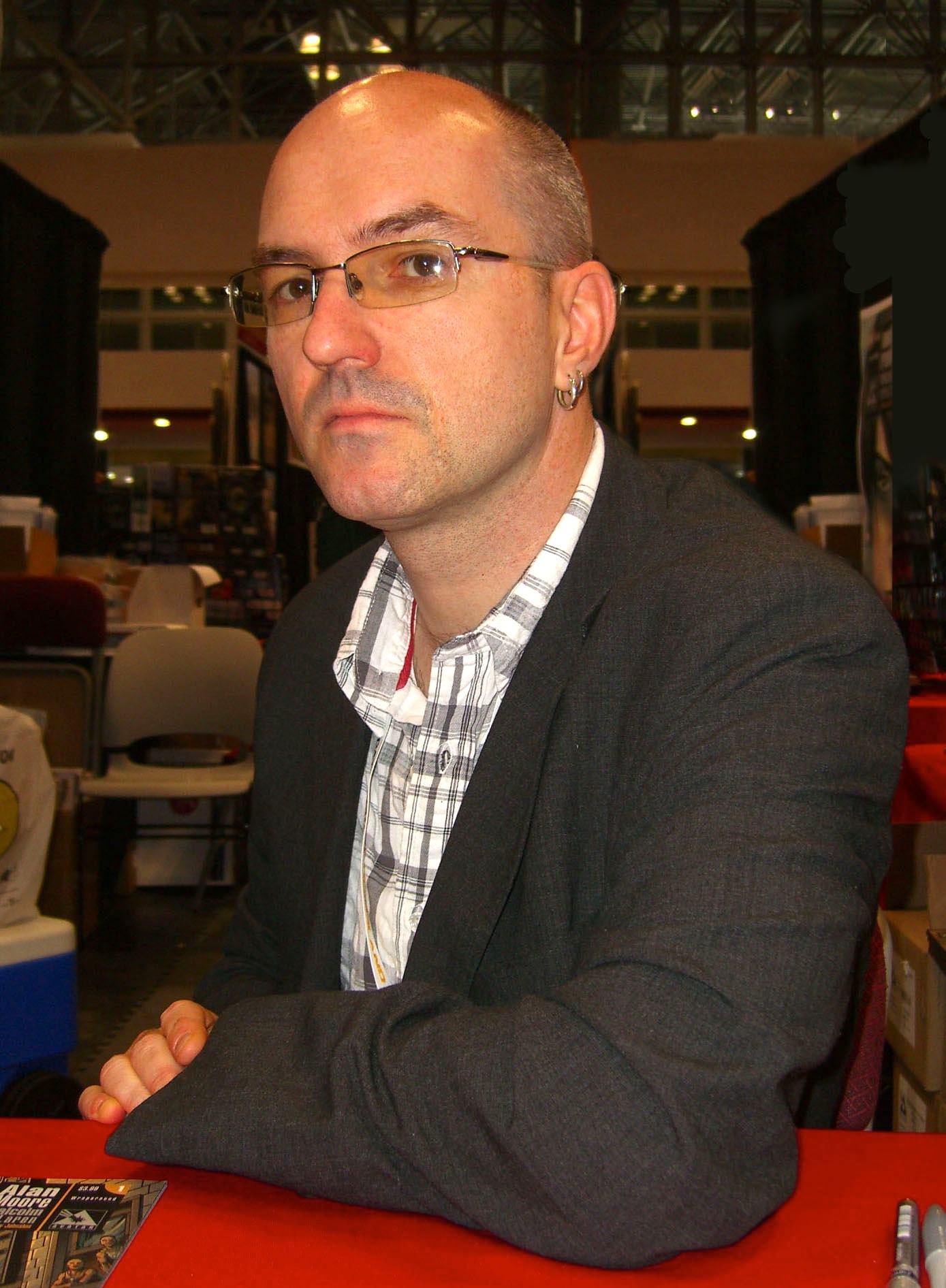
- Johnston at the 2012 New York Comic Con
- Born: 25 August 1972 (age 54) Birmingham, England
- Area: Writer
- Notable works: Wasteland; The Coldest City; Dead Space
- Awards: "Best Horror" American Independent Publishing Award

Antony Johnston (born 25 August 1972) is a British writer of comics, video games, and novels. He is known for the post-apocalyptic comic series Wasteland, the graphic novel The Coldest City (adapted for film as Atomic Blonde), and his work on several Image Comics series. He was also one of the writers for the first Dead Space game, alongside Warren Ellis and Rick Remender. On May 2023, Johnston published The Dog Sitter Detective, the first in a series.

== Career ==
Johnston started his career as a graphic designer. He began his writing career with work for role-playing magazines, then used his graphic design skills to design graphic novels.

In May 2001, Johnston was one of the three founding editors of NinthArt.com, an attempt at taking a literary and critical approach to the comics medium designed to act as a journal and aimed at "the discerning reader". Between 2001 and 2004, he contributed a mostly-monthly editorial entitled "Cassandra Complex", and for five years formed one-third of the infrequent "Triple A" discussions, including the last (on 19 June 2006).

His fiction debut, Frightening Curves, was an illustrated horror novel with artwork by Aman Chaudhary, published by Cyberosia Publishing in 2001. The book won the Best Horror Award in the 2002 IPPY awards at Book Expo America. Johnston also produced a graphic novel – Rosemary's Backpack – and a contribution to the first PopImage anthology for Cyberosia in 2002. (Cyberosia appears to have ceased after 2020.)

Johnston's early comics work consisted primarily of non-serialised graphic novels for Oni Press, and authorised comics adaptations of prose and poetry works by Alan Moore for Avatar Press.

In 2002, he began his association with Oni Press by writing the five-issue miniseries Three Days in Europe (with art by Mike Hawthorne). After this initial mini-series, Johnston penned a number of graphic novels for Oni Press – Spooked (with Sophie Campbell), Julius (with Brett Weldele) and Closer (with Mike Norton) released between February and May 2004; The Long Haul (with Eduardo Barreto) and F-Stop (with Matthew Loux) released in February and April 2005.

=== Wasteland ===
In 2006, Johnston and Christopher Mitten launched Wasteland (2006), an ongoing post-apocalyptic series, for Oni Press. It ran for 60 issues and concluded in April 2015.

=== The Coldest City and Atomic Blonde ===
In 2012, Johnston wrote The Coldest City, an original hardback graphic novel in the Cold War espionage genre, intended to be the first in a series of books all set in Berlin during the Cold War. A prequel, The Coldest Winter, was released in 2016. Both titles were published by Oni Press.

At the Cannes Festival 2015, Focus Features announced they had acquired North American distribution rights to The Coldest City. Starring Charlize Theron and directed by David Leitch, the film, retitled Atomic Blonde, premiered in March 2017 at the South by Southwest festival.

=== Brigitte Sharp spy thriller series ===
Johnston began publishing a series of spy thriller novels about elite MI6 hacker Brigitte Sharp in 2017. The series follows her after being sidelined for years at a desk job after her first field operation went sour through conspiracies and threats to global stability.

The series currently consists of The Exphoria Code (2017), The Tempus Project (2020), and The Patrios Network (2022). In 2020, Red Planet Pictures optioned the first book for a TV series.

=== The Dog Sitter Detective Series ===
Johnston signed with Allison & Busby in 2022 to deliver a series of books in the cozy mystery genre. The first, the eponymous The Dog Sitter Detective, was released in May 2023. The second, The Dog Sitter Detective Takes the Lead, was published in January 2024. The publisher extended the deal in 2023 to a third and fourth book, which are expected in January 2025 and 2026 respectively

=== Other projects ===
In 2006, Johnston adapted Anthony Horowitz's Alex Rider series for Walker Books, beginning with Stormbreaker: The Graphic Novel. Johnston also wrote Wolverine: Prodigal Son, a Marvel Comics-licensed original English-language manga version of Wolverine, . Other Marvel work by Johnston included several Daredevil comics.

In 2008 Johnston wrote the script for the video game Dead Space as well as a comic book prequel to the Electronic Arts videogame.

In 2013 Johnston began publishing with Image Comics, starting with the "dark fantasy" Umbral in November 2013, and sci-fi/crime series The Fuse in February 2014. In 2015, he launched Codename Baboushka, an espionage thriller.

Johnston worked with doom metal band Waves of Mercury on their 2013 EP As Seasons Fleet. In 2015, he launched a dark ambient/drone music project, SILENCAEON.

In 2020, Johnston published The Organised Writer, a book describing a productivity system for writers.

Johnston appears regularly on podcasts on The Incomparable network, where he produced Unjustly Maligned for 87 episodes from 2015 to 2017. He independently produces the heavy-metal podcast Thrash It Out. Johnston also hosts and produced Writing and Breathing, a podcast in which he to spoke to authors about their working methods, across 32 episodes in 2020 and 2021.

== Awards ==
Johnston's 2001 novel Frightening Curves won the 2002 American Independent Publishing (IPPY) "Best Horror" award at Book Expo America. His scriptwriting for the character Lady Dimitrescu in Resident Evil Village had won him a D.I.C.E. Award for "Outstanding Achievement in Character" in 2022.

Additionally, Johnston has been nominated for the following awards:

- 2006: Nominated (for Wasteland) for the "Best New Series" Harvey Award
- 2007: Nominated (for Wasteland) for "Favourite Black and White Comicbook – American" Eagle Award

== Bibliography ==
=== Comics ===
- "Sunday Mourning" (short story, with Mike Norton, in 9-11, 2002)
- Rosemary's Backpack (with Drew Gilbert, 112-page graphic novel, Cyberosia Publishing, 2002, ISBN 0-9709474-7-X)
- Three Days in Europe (with Mike Hawthorne, 5-issue mini-series, Oni Press, 2002–2003, tpb, 152 pages, 2003, ISBN 1-929998-72-4)
- Alan Moore's The Courtyard (adapted from work by Alan Moore, with art by Jacen Burrows, 2-issue mini-series, Avatar Press, March 2003, tpb, 2004)
- Another Suburban Romance (adapted from work by Alan Moore, with art by Juan Jose Ryp, Avatar Press, April 2003)
- Alan Moore's Yuggoth Cultures and Other Growths #3: "Me and Dorothy Parker" (adapted from song by Alan Moore, with art by Marat Mychaels, Avatar Press, 2003, tpb, Yuggoth Cultures, 2006, paperback, ISBN 1-59291-026-2, hardback, ISBN 1-59291-027-0)
- Spooked (with Sophie Campbell, 168-page graphic novel, Oni Press, February 2004, ISBN 1-929998-79-1)
- Julius (with Brett Weldele, 168-page graphic novel, Oni Press, March 2004, ISBN 1-929998-80-5)
- Closer (with Mike Norton, 152-page graphic novel, Oni Press, May 2004, ISBN 1-929998-81-3)
- "Sweeps Week" (short story, with Mike Norton, in Noble Causes: Extended Family No. 2, Image Comics, 2004)
- Alan Moore's The Courtyard Companion (reprints Johnston's script for Alan Moore's The Courtyard with annotations by NG Christakos, Moore's original short story, new pinups/art by Jacen Burrows, and a new essay by Johnston, Avatar Press, 2004)
- Alan Moore's Hypothetical Lizard (adapted from work by Alan Moore, with art by Lorenzo Lorente, 4-issue mini-series, Avatar Press, 2004–2005, tpb, 2007)
- Yuggoth Creatures (with Jacen Burrows, Sebastian Fiumara, Andres Guinaldo, Matthew T. Martin, Juan Jose Ryp, Dheeraj Verma and Mike Wolfer, one-shot, Avatar Press, 2004)
- Nightjar (with pencils by Max Fiumara and inks by Sebastian Fiumara, 4-issue mini-series, Avatar Press, 2004–2005)
- "Spellbound" (short story, with Juan Jose Ryp, in Vivid Girls Volume 1, Avatar Press, 2005, ISBN 1-59291-022-X)
- The Long Haul (with Eduardo Barreto, 176-page grapuhc novel, Oni Press, February 2005, ISBN 1-932664-05-X)
- F-Stop (with Matthew Loux, 164-page graphic novel, Oni Press, April 2005, ISBN 1-932664-09-2)
- "Hype" (short story, with Mike Hawthorne, in Four Letter Worlds, Image Comics, 2005)
- Queen & Country Declassified (with Christopher Mitten, 3-issue mini-series, Oni Press, 2005)
- Texas Chainsaw Massacre Fearbook No. 1 (with Daniel HDR, Avatar Press, 2006)
- Wasteland (with Christopher Mitten, ongoing series, Oni Press, 2006–2015) collected as:
  - Cities In Dust (collects Wasteland #1–6, March 2007, ISBN 978-1-932664-59-1)
  - Shades of God (collects Wasteland #8–13, December 2007, ISBN 978-1-932664-90-4)
  - Black Steel in the Hour of Chaos (collects Wasteland #15–19, December 2008, ISBN 978-1-934964-08-8)
  - Dog Tribe (collects Wasteland #21-24, Jun 2008, ISBN 978-1-934964-17-0)
  - Tales of the Uninvited (collects Wasteland #7, #14, #20, #25, November 2009, ISBN 978-1-934964-29-3)
  - The Enemy Within (collects Wasteland #26–31, October 2011, ISBN 978-1-934964-30-9)
  - Under the God (collects Wasteland #33–38, July 2012, ISBN 978-1-934964-94-1)
  - Lost in the Ozone (collects Wasteland #40–44, March 2013, ISBN 978-1-620100-13-4)
  - A Thousand Lies (collects Wasteland #46–51, January 2014, ISBN 978-1-620101-18-6)
  - Last Exit for the Lost (collects Wasteland #32, #39, #45, #52, August 2014, ISBN 978-1-620101-31-5)
  - Floodland (collects Wasteland #53–60, March 2015, ISBN 978-1-620101-48-3)
  - The Apocalyptic Edition, Volume One (Hardcover, collects Wasteland #1–13, July 2009, ISBN 978-1-934964-19-4)
  - The Apocalyptic Edition, Volume Two (Hardcover, collects Wasteland #14–25, August 2010, ISBN 978-1-934964-46-0)
  - The Apocalyptic Edition, Volume Three (Hardcover, collects Wasteland #26–39, July 2013, ISBN 978-1-620100-93-6)
  - The Apocalyptic Edition, Volume Four (Hardcover, collects Wasteland #40–52, June 2014, ISBN 978-1-620101-70-4)
  - The Apocalyptic Edition, Volume Five (Hardcover, collects Wasteland #53–60, October 2015, ISBN 978-1-620102-76-3)
- Alex Rider (with Kanako Damerum and Yuzuru Takasaki):
  - Stormbreaker (Walker Books, 2006, ISBN 1-84428-111-6)
  - Point Blanc (Philomel Books, 2007, ISBN 0-399-25026-3)
  - Skeleton Key (Walker Books, September 2009, ISBN 1-4063-1348-3)
  - Eagle Strike (Walker Books, June 2012, ISBN 978-1-4063-1877-7)
- "Best Side Out" (short story, with Noel Tuazon, in Postcards: True Stories That Never Happened, Villard Books, 2007)
- "Supergiant Blues" (short story, with Luis Sopelana, in 24Seven Volume 2, Image Comics, 2007)
- Texas Strangers (with co-author Dan Evans III and art by Mario Boon, Image Comics, 2007)
- Dead Space (with Ben Templesmith, Image Comics, March–August 2008, hardback, December 2008, ISBN 1-60706-033-7)
- Wolverine: Prodigal Son (with Wilson Tortosa, 177-page graphic novel, Del Rey, April 2009, ISBN 0-345-50516-6)
- Light of Thy Countenance (adaptation of poem by Moore, with art by Felipe Massafera, 48-page graphic novella, Avatar Press, paperback, January 2009, ISBN 1-59291-062-9, hardcover, June 2009, ISBN 1-59291-063-7)
- Dead Space: Extraction (with Ben Templesmith, one-shot, Image Comics, September 2009)
- Daredevil #505–510, 512 (with co-author Andy Diggle and art by Marco Checchetto, ongoing series, Marvel Comics, April–November 2010, February 2011)
- Daredevil: Cage Match (with Sean Chen, one-shot, Marvel Comics, July 2010)
- Shadowland: Blood on the Streets (with Wellington Alves (artist), 4-issue mini-series, Marvel Comics, October 2010 – January 2011)
- Dead Space: Salvage (with Christopher Shy, 104-page graphic novel, IDW Publishing, November 2010, ISBN 1-60010-815-6)
- Shadowland: After the Fall (with Marco Checchetto/Roberto De La Torre, one-shot, Marvel Comics, February 2011)
- Spider-Island: Deadly Hands of Kung Fu (with pencils by Sebastian Fiumara, 3-issue mini-series, Marvel Comics, October–December 2011)
- Daredevil: Season One (with Wellington Alves (artist), 136-page graphic novel, Marvel Comics, March 2012)
- Fashion Beast, a 2012 adaptation of an Alan Moore screenplay written with Malcolm McLaren
- The Coldest City (with Sam Hart, 180-page graphic novel, Oni Press, May 2012)
- ZombiU: Z-14 (with Kevin Crossley, 14-part webcomic, Ubisoft, December 2012)
- Umbral (with Christopher Mitten, ongoing series, Image Comics, 2013–present) collected as:
  - Book One: Out of the Shadows (collects Umbral #1–6, May 2014, ISBN 978-1-607069-84-3)
  - Book Two: The Dark Path (collects Umbral #7–12, Feb 2015, ISBN 978-1-632152-04-6)
- The Fuse (with Justin Greenwood, Image Comics, 2014–2016) collected as:
  - Vol 1: The Russia Shift (collects The Fuse #1–6, August 2014, ISBN 978-1-632150-08-0)
  - Vol 2: Gridlock (collects The Fuse #7–12, June 2015, ISBN 978-1-632153-13-5)
  - Vol 3: Perihelion (collects The Fuse #13–18, May 2016, ISBN 978-1-632156-57-0)
  - Vol 4: Constant Orbital Revolutions (collects The Fuse #19-24, Feb 2017, ISBN 978-1-534300-40-8)
- Codename Baboushka (with Shari Chankhamma, ongoing series, Image Comics, 2015–present)
- The Coldest Winter (with Steven Perkins, 176-page graphic novel, Oni Press, December 2016)

=== Prose ===
==== Nonfiction ====
- The Organised Writer (Bloomsbury Yearbooks, November 2020, ISBN 978-1472977182)

==== Novels ====
- Frightening Curves (Cyberosia Publishing, July 2001, ISBN 0-9709474-0-2)
- (Dreams of Inan:) Stealing Life (Abaddon Books, January 2007, ISBN 1-905437-12-9)
- The Exphoria Code (Lightning Books, December 2017, ISBN 978-1785630613)
- The Tempus Project (Lightning Books, May 2020, ISBN 978-1785631795)
- The Patrios Network (Lightning Books, September 2022, ISBN 978-1785633034)
- The Dog Sitter Detective (Allison & Busby, forthcoming May 2023, ISBN 978-0749029944)
- Death in Little Venice (Allison & Busby, forthcoming January 2024, ISBN 978-0749030100)

==== Essays ====
- "Cassandra Complex Editorials" by Antony Johnston at NinthArt.com (May 2001 – April 2004) (via the Internet Archive)
- "Panel Beating: Geek To Chic/Mule Variations/Let's Kill Comics" in POPIMAGE, Vol 1 (Cyberosia Publishing, 2002)
- "Pick Up the Phone" in Alan Moore: Portrait of an Extraordinary Gentleman (Abiogenesis, 2003)
- "Getting Things Written" by Antony Johnston, August 2007
- "Acid Burns", part of the Project Blackstone lore series for StarCraft II (Blizzard Entertainment, 2013)

==== Games ====
- Dead Space (EA Redwood Shores, 2008)
- Dead Space: Extraction (Visceral Games and Eurocom, 2009)
- Dead Space Ignition (Visceral Games and Sumo Digital, 2010)
- Dead Space (Mobile) (Visceral Games and IronMonkey Studios, 2011)
- Binary Domain (Sega, 2012)
- CSR Racing (Natural Motion, 2012)
- ZombiU (Ubisoft, 2012)
- CSR Classics (Natural Motion, 2013)
- Middle-Earth: Shadow of Mordor (WB Games, 2014)
- Resident Evil Village (Capcom, 2021)
- Silent Hill: Ascension (Konami, 2023)
