= The Big Wet =

The Big Wet may refer to:

- The Big Wet, informal name for floods in Australia
- The Big Wet (comics), a fictional worldwide disaster in the comic book Wasteland
- "The Big Wet", a 2023 episode of the animated series Strange Planet
