= Maui Mallard in Cold Shadow =

1995 video game

Donald in Maui Mallard Maui Mallard in Cold Shadow
- North American SNES box art
- Developer: Disney Interactive (Note: Ported to SNES by Eurocom Entertainment Software. Bonsai Entertainment developed the Game Boy version.)
- Publishers: Disney Interactive: EU: Sega (MD); NA/EU: Nintendo (SNES); JP: Capcom (SF); NA: Sunsoft (Game Boy)
- Producers: Patrick Gilmore; Chip Vollers (PC)
- Programmer: Cary Hara
- Artists: John Fiorito; Paige Pooler (PC)
- Composers: Michael Giacchino; Patrick J. Collins; Steve Duckworth (SNES)
- Platforms: Mega Drive/Genesis; Microsoft Windows; Super NES; Game Boy
- Release: Sega Mega Drive: EU: November 24, 1995; NA: 1997 (Sega Channel); Microsoft Windows: NA: October 1996; Super NES: EU: November 28, 1996; JP: December 20, 1996; NA: January 1997; Game Boy: NA: August 1998
- Genre: Platform
- Mode: Single-player

Maui Mallard in Cold Shadow – originally released as Donald in Maui Mallard (Japanese: Donald Duck no Maui Mallard (ドナルドダックのマウイマラード)) – is a platforming video game developed and published by Disney Interactive. The game was released in Europe in November 1995, and in Brazil in spring 1997 for the Sega Mega Drive. It was also ported by Eurocom Entertainment Software to the Super NES and released in North America in January 1997, in Europe mostly in autumn 1996 (although the SNES version was released in Germany at the end of 1995), and in Japan on December 20, 1996. A Microsoft Windows port was released in North America in November 1996. It was ported one last time to the Game Boy by Bonsai Entertainment Corp., released in North America in August 1998.

The game stars Donald Duck in a metafictional role as duck detective Maui Mallard (a spoof of 1980s Hawaii-based TV detective, Magnum P.I. in name and appearance), who adopts the name "Cold Shadow" when he dresses up in ninja garb. In the North American versions of the game, all Donald Duck references are absent, and the protagonist is instead referred to as "Maui Mallard," as, according to composer Patrick Collins, the marketing team felt Donald Duck wasn't cool in the United States. Although the end of the game informed the player to look forward to Maui's next adventure, the planned sequel was cancelled.

The game was rereleased on the Steam and GOG digital storefronts on May 17, 2019.

== Gameplay ==
Besides platformer gameplay, one of the game's most distinctive gameplay features is allowing to switch the player character's form to suit one's needs. The player begins the game as Maui, whose only means of self-defence is an insect-launching pistol that can launch several forms of bugs, some of them combined for greater effect. However, once the player reaches the second level, Maui transforms into Cold Shadow, his ninja alter ego, who defends himself with short-range attacks using a bo staff. Cold Shadow's staff is also primarily used to explore the level further, such as climbing a narrow tunnel. After the second level, the player can switch back and forth between Maui and Cold Shadow at will, provided he has enough ninja tokens for the transformation. The amount of ninja tokens Maui or Cold Shadow holds determines Cold Shadow's strength – who can then chain more and more attacks as his skill improves – when played as him in the SNES version. On Mega Drive, however, Maui needs to collect red ninja tokens instead, the amount of white tokens being useful for metamorphosis alone. Some levels of the game, however, prevent Maui from transforming at all, as Cold Shadow cannot bungee jump on vines, for example, which forces the player to use Maui throughout the level.

== Plot ==
Maui Mallard is a "medium-boiled" detective visiting a tropical island when the mysterious Shabuhm Shabuhm idol goes missing. Shabuhm Shabuhm is considered the island's native guardian spirit, and unless the idol is recovered, the whole island will explode. Maui is put on the case, and his investigations lead him through a creepy mansion to ancient ninja training grounds -where he gains the ability to change into Cold Shadow- and a native village, where Maui is thrown into a volcano as a sacrifice to the native gods. Maui survives the volcano, and the islanders put him through the "test of duckhood", which Maui passes, gaining the natives' trust. The natives tell Maui that the only one who knows the location of Shabuhm Shabuhm has long since died, and Maui goes to recover his remains from the bottom of the sea before going through the land of the dead to escort his soul into rest. Ultimately, the location of Shabuhm Shabuhm is revealed, and Maui goes head-to-head with the witch doctor at his Mojo Stronghold over the idol. Maui is triumphant, and as a sign of their gratitude, the islanders name their island after their hero, despite their misgivings that the name "Mallard" has little potential for attracting tourists.

== Development and release ==
With the success of the Aladdin video game adaptation, Disney chose to bring development of titles in-house instead of licensing them to third-party developers. Inspirations for Maui Mallard included the television shows Hawaii 5-0 and Magnum P.I., martial arts films, and the games Earthworm Jim, Gunstar Heroes, and Vectorman. Because Disney's business model at the time was to leverage existing characters from their library, anything created would need to derive from one of their pre-existing properties, so Maui Mallard was made to be role played by Donald Duck to give a clear brand identity to the character. Creative Capers Entertainment assisted with the game's animations. The game design document was compiled in July 1994.

The Mega Drive version was released in Brazil and Europe, while the Genesis version was only available on the Sega Channel in North America. The original game was not released on Genesis in North America, because Disney Interactive was not a publisher in the console games market at that time and it did not have a North American publishing partner to release the game there. The European and Brazilian versions for Mega Drive have dozens of gameplay differences, both graphical (some sprites were added or changed, for example, dust appeared under Maui's feet) and software (bugs fixed, all passwords changed, etc.). In fact, an NTSC version of the Genesis game was released in Brazil, which the developers refined after the PAL version was released and were still going to be released in North America in early 1996. It was this late version (not the European ROM) that served as the basis for the port on the PC. The game was one of the first games to be released under the Disney Interactive label.

By the 1996 holiday shopping season, the CD-based PlayStation and Saturn consoles had achieved a significant presence in the market, making third party publishers reluctant to spend money on expensive cartridges for consoles such as the Super NES. Because of this, Nintendo (which owned the factory where Super NES cartridges were made and thus could manufacture them more cheaply than third parties could) licensed the game from Disney Interactive and published it in North America and Europe.

The game premiered for the North American market at Walt Disney World in September 1996. Three Maui Mallard kiosks were prepared in the Disney Interactive exhibit at the Innoventions plaza of EPCOT. Visitors could play the full game for an unlimited period of time and interact with Attractions Hosts and Hostesses who were available to play against them and share tips and tricks.

According to composer Patrick Collins, Donald Duck's name was dropped from the North American release because the marketing team felt that "Donald Duck just isn't hip in the United States like he is in Europe".

== Reception ==
Reception

Review scores
Publication	Score
AllGame	4.5/5
Electronic Gaming Monthly	8/10, 8/10, 8.5/10, 8/10 (SNES)
Famitsu	5/10, 6/10, 6/10, 6/10
GameSpot	7/10 (WIN)

Maui Mallard received positive reviews. Shawn Smith wrote in Electronic Gaming Monthly that it "has all the qualities of a great side-scroller", Mark East of GameSpot hailed it as "quite possibly the best low-tech title to come out this year", and GamePro's Bonehead deemed it "well-crafted entertainment for novice and veteran gamers who are looking for great run-n-gun action". Critics praised the large, non-linear levels and detailed graphics, and said that the ability to change between detective and ninja personas makes the gameplay both deeper and more fun.

Critics found problems with the controls and East said the Windows version is too choppy in full screen mode. A review in Nintendo Power for the Super NES version of the game also noted the passwords for level select only being available if you pass the bonus stages.

== Canceled sequel ==
There were plans for a sequel titled Maui Mallard and the Lost City of Dread for the PlayStation but it was ultimately cancelled. Many aspects were repurposed for the Hercules video game. Footage for the game was shown on YouTube in March 2022.

== See also ==
- List of Disney video games
