= Three Days in Europe =

Comic book mini-series

- Cover of the trade paperback

Publication information
- Publisher: Oni Press
- Schedule: Monthly
- Format: Mini-series
- Publication date: November 2002 - April 2003
- No. of issues: 5

Creative team
- Written by: Antony Johnston
- Artist: Mike Hawthorne

Collected editions
- Three Days in Europe: ISBN 1-929998-72-4

Three Days in Europe is a five-issue mini-series by Antony Johnston and Mike Hawthorne, published by Oni Press between November 2002 and April 2003.

== Collection ==
The series has been collected into a trade paperback:

- Three Days In Europe (by Antony Johnston and Mike Hawthorne, 5-issue mini-series, Oni Press, 2002–2003, tpb, 152 pages, 2003, ISBN 1-929998-72-4)

== Film adaptation ==
In July 2008, Jennifer Garner is attached to produce and play Jill Boscombe and Hugh Jackman as Jack Pentura in the film. In October 2009, Dan McDermott said he's writing the script. As of 2026, no further developments have been made and it can be assumed that the project was scrapped.
