= Fashion Beast =

Comic book series (2012)

- First edition cover of Fashion Beast issue 1

Publication information
- Publisher: Avatar Press
- Schedule: Monthly
- Format: Limited series
- No. of issues: 10

Creative team
- Written by: Alan Moore, Malcolm McLaren, Antony Johnston
- Artist: Facundo Percio
- Colorist: Hernan Cabrera

Fashion Beast is a 2012 ten issue limited series and screenplay by Alan Moore, Malcolm McLaren, and Antony Johnston. The series is an adaptation of a 1980s script that Moore wrote based upon the fairy tale Beauty and the Beast.

== Plot ==
The series begins with Doll, who dreams of stardom, getting fired from her job as a coat checker at a trendy dance club after an angry patron vandalises the cloakroom. Unemployed, she attends an audition to be a "mannequin" for Celestine, a hermit and much sought-after designer rumoured to be disfigured. Despite her audition being panned by the elderly women that run his fashion house and factory, Celestine chooses Doll to be his newest model. However she very soon discovers that the same person who vandalised the cloakroom, a designer named Jonni, also works at Celestine's factory.

The two are immediately at odds with each other, with Jonni putting Doll down as someone who would do anything for fame. Upset, Doll runs from the factory, only to later return. Jonni is drawn to Doll, finding her an unintentional muse for her work, yet is angry and disgusted with her, especially after Doll takes credit for some of her fashion ideas. Jonni attempts to complain to Celestine, only to be rebuked for her actions. Doll is later called to his office, where Celestine gives her a speech on the power of fashion and the limitations of humanity. This frightens Doll, but she is persuaded to remain in his office because Celestine is lonely. He confesses that he remains in his office designing clothing and playing with tarot cards to hide his disfigurement from society. Celestine also comments upon his deceased mother, saying that she was incredibly beautiful and that she frequently told him that he was unattractive. Curious, Doll demands to see Celestine's face and is stunned to see that rather than a hideous monster, Celestine is incredibly attractive and that his beliefs stem from his mother's words and a mirror that dramatically distorts his appearance. Despite this, Doll lies to Celestine when he asks her if he's ugly. Emotional due to the lie, Doll runs downstairs and confronts his managers, who tell her that they keep Celestine in the dark because he is only capable of designing beautiful clothing because he believes himself ugly. They further mention that Doll herself is aware of this and that this is why she told the lie.

The tension in the fashion house grows ever more complicated as Doll begins to long to go outside and experience some of her previous life. She gains permission from Celestine to go back to some of the places she used to visit, only to be confronted by Jonni, who believes that Celestine has lost touch with reality. Jonni further expounds on his viewpoints, saying that he believes that the surrounding group of lowlifes, prostitutes, and various other passers-by are vital and colourful. Doll angrily confronts Jonni, disputing his claims. Upset and disappointed at how much everything has changed in both herself and the outside world, Doll returns home and finds that Celestine has slit his wrists in an attempt to seek freedom from the fashion house he considers a prison.

Celestine passes away from his self-inflicted injuries and Jonni takes over as the head of Celestine's fashion house, as Celestine specified that this was what he wanted. Jonni and Doll are shown to have started a relationship of sorts along with their working relationship. However the series ends with Jonni discovering Celestine's mirror and seeing how it distorted his appearance just as much as it did Celestine's.

== History ==
Fashion Beast was originally written by Moore in 1985 while he was working on Watchmen, with the intention of it becoming a full-length feature film. The screenplay was never filmed and the work sat unpublished for thirty years until Moore was approached by Avatar Press to collaborate on a graphic novel adaptation of the work with Antony Johnson and Facundo Percio. Fashion Beast was announced to have a ten issue run, with the first issue releasing in September 2012. The ten issues were collected in a trade paperback, also titled Fashion Beast, in 2013.

== Reception ==
Reception for issue one of Fashion Beast has been mostly positive. Comic Book Resources wrote that there were pacing issues with the first issue and that its origins as a screenplay were apparent, but that it "is quite close to being a fairly typical Alan Moore experience. Which is to say, it's actually very good."
