= G-Force (video game) =

2009 video game

- North American PlayStation 3 cover art
- Developers: Eurocom; Keen Games (PSP, DS); Disney Mobile (iOS, mobile)
- Publisher: Disney Interactive Studios
- Platforms: Windows, Nintendo DS, PlayStation 2, PlayStation 3, PlayStation Portable, Wii, Xbox 360, iOS, mobile phones
- Release: July 21, 2009: NA: July 21, 2009; EU: July 31, 2009; AU: September 16, 2009; iOS; August 6, 2009; Mobile phones; September 2009
- Genres: Action, platform
- Modes: Single-player, multiplayer

G-Force is an action platform video game based on the film of the same name. It was released in July 2009 for Microsoft Windows, Nintendo DS, PlayStation 2, PlayStation 3, PlayStation Portable, Wii, Xbox 360, iOS and mobile phones.

== Plot ==
The plot is based on the film, in which a group of highly trained guinea pigs (Darwin, Blaster, and Juarez) fight against Leonard Saber, an evil billionaire and his robotic "household appliances" army.

The game's plot differs from the film in several key ways. In the film, Speckles goes missing after the others escape the pet store and is not revealed to have survived until near the end of the film. In the game, Speckles resurfaces shortly after his apparent death. The game also interjects several new locations including the appliance production centre and a series of sewers not seen in the film. Saber's partner Yanshu talks to Darwin several times throughout the third and fourth acts. Also, when Saber finds out that he had been manipulated into activating Clusterstorm, the G-Force team save him after he is falsely arrested by the FBI. In the film, Saber is falsely captured by the FBI before he is given the assignment to recall his consumer products to atone for his mistakes.

Darwin finds Speckles in a giant satellite dish rather than at an appliance store, and Speckles does not have a change of heart and stop his own plan. Instead, Mooch destroys Speckles' machine, apparently killing him. At the end of the game, Speckles emerges from the wreckage, implying he survived and is still planning revenge. Additionally, Ben orders G-Force to vacate the area when the FBI closes in, instead of them being promoted by the FBI.

== Gameplay ==
G-Force is an action-adventure game played from a third person perspective. The player plays through multiple linear levels in a variety of environments in order to progress. In combat, the player controls Darwin and must use his arsenal to defeat his enemies. Some of the weapons in Darwin's arsenal include an electric whip, a plasma gun, and a freeze gun.

Outside of combat, the player must complete platforming challenges using Darwin's jetpack which allows him to hover in the air. They must also solve puzzles, some of which require the player to control Mooch, a gnat who can fly and enter places Darwin cannot. Mooch can disable enemies and traps, which allows Darwin to progress. In certain sections, the player controls a modified hamster ball and must travel through sewers, shooting enemies and avoiding obstacles.

Throughout the game, the player can collect SaberSense Chips, an in-game currency that allows the player to purchase upgrades for their weapons.

The PlayStation 3 and Xbox 360 versions featured an anaglyph-based stereoscopic 3-D mode, and were packaged with two sets of 3-D glasses.

== Reception ==
Reception

Aggregate scores
Aggregator	Score							
Aggregator	DS	iOS	PC	PS2	PS3	PSP	Wii	Xbox 360
GameRankings	73%	70%	67%	68%	71%	70%	75%	70%
Metacritic	73/100	N/A	61/100	59/100	68/100	53/100	69/100	68/100

Review scores
Publication	Score							
Publication	DS	iOS	PC	PS2	PS3	PSP	Wii	Xbox 360
Game Informer	N/A	N/A	N/A	N/A	7.75/10	N/A	N/A	7.75/10
GameRevolution	N/A	N/A	C	N/A	C	N/A	N/A	C
GamesMaster	N/A	N/A	N/A	N/A	N/A	N/A	N/A	77%
GameSpot	N/A	N/A	N/A	N/A	7.5/10	6.5/10	7.5/10	7.5/10
GameTrailers	N/A	N/A	N/A	N/A	N/A	N/A	N/A	7/10
GameZone	N/A	N/A	N/A	N/A	7/10	N/A	N/A	7.3/10
IGN	7/10	7.5/10	N/A	7.3/10	7.3/10	7.4/10	7.3/10	7.3/10
Official Xbox Magazine (US)	N/A	N/A	N/A	N/A	N/A	N/A	N/A	6/10
PlayStation: The Official Magazine	N/A	N/A	N/A	N/A	3.5/5	N/A	N/A	N/A
TeamXbox	N/A	N/A	N/A	N/A	N/A	N/A	N/A	7.4/10
Common Sense Media	N/A	N/A	N/A	N/A	N/A	N/A	4/5	N/A

The game received "mixed or average reviews" on all platforms except the iOS version, according to the review aggregation website Metacritic.

GameSpot said of the PlayStation 3, Wii, and Xbox 360 versions: "Fun combat and crafty puzzles make this a good companion to the blockbuster movie". Greg Miller of IGN said "G-Force isn't a game everyone should be lining up to play, but people looking to have an interactive piece of the movie shouldn't be disappointed". IT Reviews wrote: "The flaws are easy to spot; G-Force is decent, solid, chipper family entertainment". Game Revolution was more negative, giving it a "C" grade and criticized the "repetitive puzzle design [and] bland visuals".

The 3D mode received mixed reviews. GamesMaster said of the Xbox 360 version: "Don't underestimate the wow factor of the 3D mode - if this is the future of games, sign us up". IT Reviews, on the other hand, said of the same console version: "The 3D glasses bundled in are a gimmick at best, a one-way trip to a headache at worst".
