= Magician (video game) =

- Developer(s): Eurocom
- Publisher(s): Taxan
- Designer(s): Chris Shrigley
- Programmer(s): Tim Rogers
- Artist(s): Mat Sneap, Hugh Binns
- Composer(s): Neil Baldwin
- Platform(s): Nintendo Entertainment System
- Release: NA: February 1991
- Genre(s): Action role-playing game
- Mode(s): Single-player

Magician is a side-scrolling action role-playing game released for the Nintendo Entertainment System. It was designed by Eurocom Entertainment Software and published by Taxan.

== Plot ==
According to the game's manual, an evil magician named Abadon was able to use his power to summon groups of evil beasts, and then built a castle for himself. He then sent out his followers to rid the peace-loving land of Merlwood of its most powerful wizards, a task that was accomplished with ease. While this was going on, a young man named Paul, an apprentice magician who lives in the land of Serenna, is preparing to go on a quest to travel across the land to learn all of the secrets from the ancient masters. However, he hears of the purging of wizards by Abadon, and instead sets out as the last wizard alive to defeat Abadon.

== Gameplay ==
Magician gameplay

The player must navigate Paul through puzzles and mazes in order to acquire more items, which allow him to learn more spells, and weapons, which allow him to cast certain spells or shield himself. More importantly, Paul is supposed to interact with people who can help him along his quest.

Apart from Paul's health, the player also manage his food and water levels, which decrease over time and are refilled by using food and water. Paul sets out with some food, water, and money. The game uses a unique system for learning and using magic spells: the player transcribes spells by piecing together sets of phonemes to form magic words, and each spell has a corresponding word that must be written to learn it. Players can simply write the spell words for every single spell at the start of the game (although writing a spell costs 50 mana each).

By helping other characters and completing various tasks, Paul grows more experienced, increasing his maximum mana and his rank as a magician.

The game uses a battery-backed save system, which allows the player to save their progress at any time. However, it only allows the player to save a maximum of 15 times, with four different save slots to use.

== Legacy ==
In December 2012 programmer Chris Shrigley released the source code for educational purposes to the public.
