= Alan Moore's Hypothetical Lizard =

- Cover to Alan Moore's Hypothetical Lizard #1. Art by Sebastian Fiumara.

Publication information
- Publisher: Avatar Press (US)
- Format: Limited series
- Publication date: 2004, 2005
- No. of issues: 4
- Main character(s): Som-Som, Rawra Chin

Creative team
- Written by: Alan Moore; Antony Johnston
- Artist(s): Lorenzo Lorente and Sebastian Fiumara

Alan Moore's Hypothetical Lizard is a four-issue comic book adaptation of the World Fantasy Award-nominated short story "A Hypothetical Lizard", written in 1988 by Alan Moore for the third volume of the Liavek shared world fantasy series. The story was later reprinted in "Words Without Pictures", a 1990 book of prose stories by comics writers edited by Steve Niles, but then went out of print. In 2004 Avatar Press published the first issue of Alan Moore's Hypothetical Lizard as a comic book adapted by writer Antony Johnston.

The story describes the life of Som-Som, a prostitute in the House Without Clocks - a brothel designed to service rare and exotic tastes. Som-Som has undergone a corpus callosotomy, severing the connection between the two hemispheres of her brain; this, in conjunction with the porcelain mask attached to the right half of her face, and the thick glove on her right hand, destroys the connections between her thoughts and actions. Therefore, she can see and hear, but not speak of or act on, any secrets her wizard clientele may inadvertently reveal in the throes of passion. Consequently, Som-Som can only watch as her transsexual friend Rawra Chin is slowly destroyed by an abusive relationship.
