= Mike Hawthorne =

American comic book artist and writer

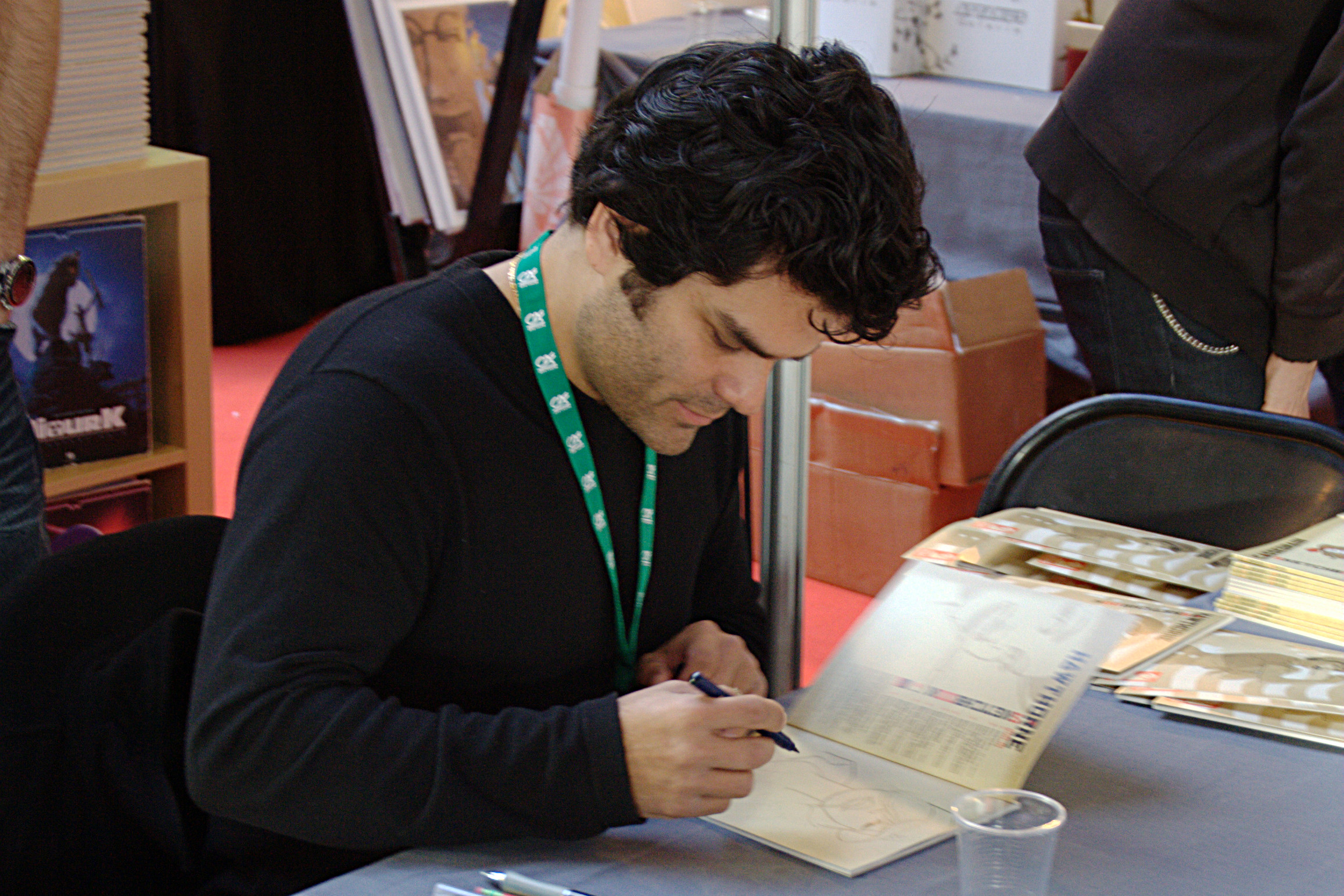
- Mike Hawthorne in Quai des Bulles, Saint-Malo comics festival, 2012
- Born: 1975 or 1976 (age 50–51)
- Area: Artist
- Notable works: Batman, Deadpool, Spider-Man, the Superior Spider-Man, and Wonder Woman

Mike Hawthorne is an American comic book artist and artist, known for his work on books such as Batman, Spider-Man, Wonder Woman, the Superior Spider-Man, and Deadpool.

== Career ==
Mike Hawthorne began his career self publishing his comic series, Hysteria, with his company Thinktank Comics. He debuted in comics with Matt Wagner's Grendel: Red, White, and Black. Some of his early work includes The Un-men, Fear Agent, Umbra, G.I. JOE: Origins, Whiskey Dickel, Three Days in Europe, one story arc of Queen & Country, and Conan: Road of Kings.

He's gone on to work for virtually every comic publisher in the United States, and many of his works have been published overseas, like the comic book Oms en Serie. He has worked for both Marvel and DC comics and drawn all of the most popular characters for both companies. Some notable examples books series he's worked on are Batman, Wonder Woman, Deadpool, Daredevil, Hulk, X-men, Star Wars, Spider-Man, Guardians of the Galaxy, and more. In fact, Hawthorne has worked on over 130 comic books at Marvel comics alone. Hawthorne illustrated 5 of the 10 most sold comics of 2023, including the top four spaces and the eighth space.

He was nominated for an Eisner Award for his work with Greg Rucka on Queen & Country, and nominated for a Harvey Award for his work with Steve Murphy on their limited series Umbra.

Hawthorne is also the author and artist of the best selling graphic novel, Happiness Will Follow, and is currently working on an upcoming book with Image Comics.

Hawthorne has self-published multiple books through Kickstarter, like his art books All City, Life Studied, Little/RED, Warm Ups, and instructional and educational manuals, The Drawing Cheat Codes and Anatomy Guide. He is also a professor at the Pennsylvania College of Art and Design. There is a mural in Philadelphia, Pennsylvania, where Hawthorne went to University, that features his art of La Borinqueña, a Puerto Rican Superhero.

== Style ==
Hawthorne uses a comic book style influenced by realism. When composing illustrations, he draws from cinematic styles and shots as they are used in film, which he describes as the combination of "the characters acting, the way you shoot the character, the way you draw the character into the panel, and how the panel plays into that". Hawthorne has a background in anatomy and figure drawing.

== Personal life ==
Hawthorne is originally from New York, but now lives in central Pennsylvania with his wife and three children. Hawthorne is a 1993 graduate of William Penn Senior High School. It was there that he met his wife Despina, with whom he has three children. Hawthorne earned a scholarship for a summer program by the Governor's School for the Arts, and graduated in 1998 from Tyler School of Art at Temple University.

== Bibliography ==
- Three Days In Europe (with Antony Johnston, 4-issue mini-series, Oni Press, 2002–2003, tpb, 152 pages, 2003, ISBN 1-929998-72-4)
- G.I. JOE: Origins Vol. 1 (with Larry Hama, 4-issue mini-series, IDW Publishing, tpb, 128 pages, 2009, ISBN 1-60010-497-5)
- Queen & Country: The Definitive Edition, Vol. 2 (with Greg Rucka, Oni Press, tpb, 376 pages, 2008, ISBN 1-932664-89-0)
- Conan Volume 11: Road of Kings (with Roy Thomas, 12-issue mini-series, Dark Horse, tpb, 152 pages, 2011, ISBN 1-59582-824-9)
- The Superior Spider-Man: Full Otto (with Christos Gage, 5-issue series, Marvel, tpb, 136 pages, 2019, ISBN 1-30291-480-4)
- The Superior Spider-Man: Otto-Matic (with Gage, 5-issue series, Marvel, tpb, 136 pages, 2019, ISBN 1-30291-481-2)
