= Sphinx and the Cursed Mummy =

2003 video game

- North American cover art
- Developer: Eurocom (Note: Mobile version developed by Humagade. Remaster handled by THQ Nordic and developed by Ismael Ferreras Morezuelas.)
- Publishers: THQ; THQ Nordic (Remaster)
- Director: Victor Garrido
- Producers: Victor Garrido; Padraig Growley
- Designer: Martin Kilcoyne
- Programmer: Martin Hall
- Artist: Julian Romero
- Composer: Steve Duckworth
- Engine: EngineX
- Platforms: GameCube, PlayStation 2, Xbox, Mobile, Windows, macOS, Linux, Nintendo Switch, PlayStation 4, Xbox One
- Release: GameCube, PlayStation 2, Xbox: NA: 11 November 2003; EU: 20 February 2004; Mobile: WW: 19 August 2004; Windows, macOS, Linux: WW: 10 November 2017; Nintendo Switch: WW: 29 January 2019; PlayStation 4: WW: 1 April 2025; Xbox One: WW: TBD
- Genre: Action-adventure
- Mode: Single-player

Sphinx and the Cursed Mummy is a 2003 action-adventure video game developed by Eurocom and published by THQ for GameCube, PlayStation 2, and Xbox. A version for mobile phones was released in 2004. THQ Nordic published a high-definition remaster for PC in 2017 and Nintendo Switch in 2019.

Set in a fantasy world based on Ancient Egypt, the plot follows the demigod Sphinx and now-undead mummy Tutankhamun working against the schemes of the evil god Set. Gameplay features each character navigating environments which incorporate platforming and puzzles. Sphinx's sections incorporate combat and exploring open areas, while Tutankhamun's sections focus on elemental puzzles in Set's stronghold.

Beginning as an animated film concept in 1999, the project was picked up as a video game and began production in 2000. The team wanted a focus on exploration and puzzles with an Egyptian aesthetic for its world and characters, with its gameplay being compared by its developers to The Legend of Zelda. Some gameplay elements and several areas were cut from the final game. These elements were restored to the remaster via fan-created mods. Sphinx was generally well received for its gameplay and art design, but sold poorly.

== Gameplay ==
The gameplay is divided between the action-oriented Sphinx (top) and the puzzle-focused Tutankhamun (bottom).

Sphinx and the Cursed Mummy is an action-adventure video game in which players take on the role of two characters; the demigod Sphinx, and the undead mummy Tutankhamun. Transitions between the two are story driven, with cutscenes marking the shift between Sphinx and Tutankhamun. Both characters can interact with switches and pick up items.

As Sphinx, the player explores town environments, open areas, and dungeons. Sphinx primarily fights with a sword and gains several additional tools throughout the story, including a shield, a blowpipe, a double jump, gauntlets that enable him to move heavy objects, beetles that can capture weakened enemies, and Ankhs that increase his health. In some areas, Sphinx can play minigames based on memorising color and symbol sequences. Scarabs found in the environment act as currency.

Tutankhamun cannot die or battle enemies, with gameplay instead focusing on puzzle solving and stealth. Taking damage and being exposed to certain elements enables him to solve puzzles and activate switches in otherwise inaccessible places. These effects are cancelled through contact with water. Puzzles involve activating switches and navigating dungeons by platforming.

== Plot ==
Sphinx is set in a land once united, now splintered by an ancient war into multiple kingdoms connected by ancient portals. The priest Imhotep sends his two apprentices, the demigods Sphinx and Horus, into the hostile land of Uruk to retrieve a weapon dubbed the Blade of Osiris. The arrogant Horus is seemingly killed after the two are attacked by a beam weapon from the fortress of the god Set, and Sphinx retrieves the Blade. In the human kingdom of Luxor, the young Tutankhamun discovers a conspiracy seemingly being hatched by his brother Akhenaten−in reality Akhenaten is the disguised Set, who transforms him into a mummy. Sphinx arrives and disrupts the ritual, and escaping to the city of Abydos finds the kingdoms under attack. Travelling to Heliopolis, Sphinx is met by Horus, later revealed to have been suborned by Set. Guided by Imhotep, Sphinx seeks out help from Anubis, who instructs Sphinx to retrieve four Sacred Crowns left among the kingdoms by the gods.

The Crowns of Abydos, Uruk and Heliopolis are recovered from disguised agents of Set seeking to cripple the kingdoms. In parallel, Imhotep sends Canopic jars containing Tutankhamun's life force to the castle of Uruk via the animated Basket, where briefly reanimated he is able to retrieve key items and sabotage some of Set's plans. It is revealed that Set and his banished brother Osiris were once one being, the deity Ra, but split apart and triggered the war. By collecting the crowns, Anubis has the means to summon Osiris and merge the two again, which Set opposes. Tutankhamun retrieves the Crown of Set, but is discovered and captured. Sphinx travels to Uruk and fights Set. With Set defeated, Osiris merges with him and reunites as Ra, who gives Tutankhamun the final jar. Tutankhamun accidentally breaks the jar, but Imhotep assures him they will restore his human form.

== Development ==
British developer Eurocom had made a name for themselves developing licensed video games, with the team deciding to begin creating self-owned original properties. The first major attempt at this was Sphinx. The original Sphinx concept began as an animated film pitch created in 1999 by Spanish animation group Anibyte, which had worked with Eurocom on the CGI cutscenes for 40 Winks. When they failed to find funding, Anibyte brought the project to Eurocom and it was redesigned as a game. Already present were a Sphinx character, Anubis, and some monsters. Production began in 2000, lasting three years including a pre-production period lasting six months to a year. The title was picked up by publisher THQ, who had worked with Eurocom on a number of their earlier projects.

The team wanted an exotic setting, briefly considering an "Arabian-style" design before settling on Ancient Egypt after the mummy design received positive feedback from the staff. The characters and enemies were designed by Julian Romero. Composer Steve Duckworth described the music as having a "Western orchestral sound" blended with Arabian elements. Voice acting was wanted by Eurocom staff, but THQ turned it down as unnecessary, something staff members felt was a mistake and alienated some players unused to the Zelda-style voiceless cutscenes. According to staff member Mat Sneap, Sphinx was being designed as the start of a potential franchise, with both sequels and multimedia expansions under consideration.

A dual character system was different gameplay styles was present from early production. The gameplay was compared by staff member Rob Loftus to The Legend of Zelda, with the aim being for a similar experience on other consoles. The team's aim was to create a gameplay and art design that would appeal to a wide audience similar to The Legend of Zelda. The team were aiming at a generally even balance between action, platforming and puzzle solving. The basic design did not change throughout development, though the role of the mummy increased in prominence based on positive internal feedback. The two protagonists had their personality built into their gameplay, with Sphinx being a "brash" person with action, and Tutankhamen being more comedic and timid. The in-game character animations were based on videos the animators took of themselves performing various actions.

The team created a custom engine for the game, later called EngineX. Designer Darren Weekes described this as a difficult aspect of production, as the tools were "alien" compared to third-party engines such as Quake. Maintaining 60 frames per second during all gameplay was a priority for the team. It was noted that the team had to work around memory limitations when creating the game's environments. Priority was not given to a specific platform with the game instead being designed to play to each console's strengths, though it was stated the team were taking advantage of the GameCube's specifications for more advanced in-game lighting. Early promotional media touted seven different world environments, including an underwater realm called Akaria and the jungle-dominated Sakkara. Both Akaria and Sakkara, and some associated gameplay sequences and mechanics related to both Sphinx and the mummy along with late-game events, were cut or condensed to make the planned release date.

== Release ==
THQ announced Sphinx in 2003, first for PlayStation 2 (PS2), and later for GameCube and Xbox. Originally titled Sphinx and the Shadow of Set, the title was changed to Sphinx and the Cursed Mummy to better reflect Tutankhamun's gameplay role. Some preview builds used a third provisional title, "Sphinx and the Misfortunate Mummy". The game was first released in North America on 10 November 2003. This version notably contained a game-breaking bug related to a save point. It later released in Europe on 20 February 2004, and in South Korea on 3 April. A thirty-second CGI television commercial was created for the game by Blur Studio.

A version for mobile phones was developed by Humagade and published by THQ for mobile phones in May 2004. Split into twelve levels, the gameplay features similar elements to the console versions adjusted for the mobile platform. For this version, animator Jose Garcia incorporated elements cut from the main game. Following release Eurocom−which later closed and reformed as mobile studio EightPixelsSquare−retained the rights to the property, and unsuccessfully attempted development of a sequel. Garcia was at one time attempting to remake the game for mobiles at the reformed studio. The intellectual property was bought from EightPixelsSquare by THQ Nordic in December 2016. The Xbox version was part of the final batch of backwards compatible titles for Xbox One in 2019.

A high-definition remaster was released by THQ Nordic on Windows, macOS and Linux personal computer systems worldwide on 10 November 2017. Based on the PAL PS2 and Xbox versions, the remaster included updated graphics, technical fixes including the save bug, support for keyboard and mouse controls, and expanded audio and visual support. The remaster was handled by THQ Nordic, with the conversion and programming were handled by Ismael Ferreras Morezuelas, also known under the modder username Swyter. Morezuelas continued updating the PC version after release, restoring graphical elements based on original assets, adding new lighting and graphics features, and fixing new and pre-existing bugs. Modding tools for the game's engine were released in February 2018 for the Windows version. The toolkit also included assets related to the game's cut content. With the release of authoring tools, the cut content had been gradually restored by modders. A Nintendo Switch port was released on 29 January 2019. Morezuelas worked on the Switch port alongside continuing software patches for the PC release. A PlayStation 4 port was released on 1 April 2025 while an Xbox One port was originally set to release on 15 April 2025. However, due to the unfinished state of the port, the release is delayed and is in development.

== Reception ==
Reception

Aggregate scores
Aggregator	Score
GameRankings	(GC) 78% (PS2) 79% (XBOX) 81% (MOB) 70%
Metacritic	(GC) 79/100 (PS2) 78/100 (XBOX) 79/100 (NS) 61/100

Review scores
Publication	Score
Destructoid	6.5/10
Electronic Gaming Monthly	8/7/7
GamePro	3.5/5
GameSpot	8.2/10
GameSpy	3/5
IGN	8.5/10
Nintendo Life	7/10
Official U.S. PlayStation Magazine	3.5/5

Sphinx was well received by much of the gaming community. IGN gave the game 8.5/10, calling it a "fun, challenging action-adventure serv[ing] up a semi-non-linear experience complete with huge worlds to explore, difficult and satisfying puzzles, entertaining weapon and item advancements". It was praised by critics for its unique characters and compelling storyline. The game's graphics were also highly praised for their quality. However, some criticism was directed at the lack of voice acting to coincide with the text-heavy dialogue. Commercially, the game performed poorly, with "sluggish sales [...] across all systems".

The mobile release, which was not developed by Eurocom, received a more muted response, though still generally positive, with a 70.50% aggregate score on GameRankings. IGN's Levi Buchanan admired the game's graphics, but criticised the "freaky" isometric controls for not being "as user-friendly as they need to be", overall feeling the game was "a pretty good purchase for fans of the original console game or in the hunt for an adventure title." Reviewing the title for GameSpot, Carrie Gouskos enjoyed the game's adherence to the style of the console title, saying it did "a good job of maintaining the look and personality of the franchise", but called the controls "uncomfortable", the sound "not that interesting" and said the gameplay "doesn't have great longevity", overall finding it frustrating for anyone but players seeking "a simple little action game [or] particular fan[s] of the series".
