= Machine Hunter =

1997 video game

- North American PlayStation box art
- Developer: Eurocom Entertainment Software
- Publisher: MGM Interactive
- Producer: Mark Hetherington
- Designer: Rob Craven
- Composer: Neil Baldwin
- Platforms: Microsoft Windows, PlayStation
- Release: EU: July 1997; NA: August 1997
- Genre: Shoot 'em up
- Modes: Single-player, multiplayer

Machine Hunter is a top-down shooter game developed by Eurocom Entertainment Software, published by MGM Interactive and distributed in Europe by Eidos Interactive. It was developed and released simultaneously in 1997 for Windows 95 and the PlayStation. It has been described as a clone of the 1995 game Loaded, in that it uses an overhead perspective, extensive lighting effects, and over-the-top bloodshed.

== Plot ==
In a bleak future, a virus is turning robots into killing machines. The carrier of the virus must be tracked down and destroyed if humanity has any chance of survival.

== Gameplay ==
The game is presented in a top-down overhead perspective, with the option of a fixed or rotating camera. Players must guide the character through 17 unique stages whilst battling alien, mutant, and mechanical enemies. The primary focus is the rescuing of hostages and occasionally obtaining an item such as a key card, defusing or planting bombs, or completing an objective under a time limit. Players are encouraged to "transfer" or transform into one of nine unique types of robots encountered throughout the stages, each with their own distinct appearance, weapons, and abilities.

Power-ups are present, scattered throughout each stage and hidden in secret areas. Power-ups include:

- Energy - Increases the player's energy by 50%.
- Power Level 2 - The player's projectiles turn green, and do more damage than the player's default weapon. Adds minor abilities to robot weaponry, such as faster fire rate or ricochet bullets
- Power Level 3 - The player's projectiles turn blue, and do even more damage than level 2. Adds major abilities to robot weaponry, such as homing projectiles or larger damage radius.
- Mines - Placed on the floor, after 5 seconds or contact with an enemy unit it will detonate, causing massive damage. If the player is too close it will damage him as well.
- Area Bomb - An area of effect detonation that heavily damages all enemy units in an approximately 10 meter radius of the player.
- Missile - A projectile fired forwards from the player and detonating on impact with an enemy or object. Does massive damage in a 10-meter radius.
- Spike Ball - A spiked ball that floats in the air, encircling the player. Kills any enemy unit with one hit, but requires being in very close proximity. There is a homing variation as well, wherein the ball will gravitate to the nearest enemy. This function has a range of about 3 meters.
- Shield - A hemispherical robotic shield that orbits the rear of the player character. Deflects projectiles if they hit, but does not deflect melee attacks or flame-based weaponry. There is an upgraded version which fires a single bullet behind the player every time the player fires his main weapons.
- Invulnerability - Very few and far between, this power-up makes the player invulnerable to all forms of damage for 25 seconds. Will not protect against falling into acid or lava pits.

== Development ==
The game was showcased at E3 1997. The title of the game changed multiple times during development. Initially announced as "H.O.S.T.", it was later renamed "HOST" (no periods), then "Droid Hunter", then "Suicide Run", before finally being released as Machine Hunter. The name "Droid Hunter" was discarded due to the potential for legal challenges from LucasArts (who held a trademark on the word "droid" via the entities from Star Wars), while "Suicide Run" was eventually rejected because the developers thought it sounded too much like a racing game.

== Reception ==
Reception

Review scores
Publication	Score
Computer Games Strategy Plus	2.5/5 (PC)
Electronic Gaming Monthly	7.125/10 (PS1)
Game Informer	7.25/10 (PS)
GameFan	83% (PS1) (Note: Three critics of GameFan gave the PlayStation version each a score of 80, 83, and 85.)
GameRevolution	D+ (PC)
GameSpot	4.6/10 (PS1); 3.1/10 (WIN)
IGN	5/10 (PS1)
Next Generation	1/5 (PS1)
PC Gamer (US)	72% (PC)
PlayStation: The Official Magazine	4/5 (PS1)

Reviews for Machine Hunter widely varied. While critics unanimously remarked that the game is a blatant clone of Loaded, Electronic Gaming Monthly and GamePro opined that the multitiered levels and the ability to take over disabled machines give Machine Hunter enough of its own character and depth to make it worthwhile, whereas Next Generation argued that though these two elements do represent positive originality, "the similarities overpower any differences, and on the whole, the game is little more than a poorly executed rip-off." Glenn Rubenstein wrote in GameSpot that while the game is reasonably fun, "most die-hard fans will be a lot happier dusting off their copy of the original Loaded".

In addition to the limited originality, the controls have been heavily criticized due to weak responsiveness and the difficulty in executing diagonals with the standard PlayStation controller. However, GamePro contended that "The controls are smooth and very responsive to onscreen action." (Note: GamePro gave the PlayStation version 4.5/5 scores for graphics and control, 3.5/5 for sound, and 4.0/5 for fun factor.) And where Rubenstein said the split screen used in the multiplayer mode is annoying, GamePro asserted that the multiplayer mode is the most fun part of the game.

Most reviews commented that the graphics are more detailed and feature more impressive effects than Loaded, though Rubenstein added that they were still not good enough to stand out amongst contemporary PlayStation games. Despite their overall positive reaction to the game, the Electronic Gaming Monthly review team acknowledged that the gameplay becomes very repetitive.

The Windows version was more negatively received than the PlayStation version, with reviews citing baffling low-resolution graphics and controls which are even more confusing and poorly responsive than the PlayStation version's.
