= Dead Space (comics) =

2008 science fiction comic

- Cover art for the collected volume of the 2008 Dead Space comic series by Ben Templesmith

Publication information
- Publisher: Image Comics
- Schedule: Monthly
- Format: Limited series
- Genre: Gothic science fiction
- Publication date: March–September 2008
- No. of issues: 6

Creative team
- Written by: Antony Johnston
- Artist: Ben Templesmith
- Letterer: Rus Wooton

Dead Space is a science fiction horror comic book series written by Antony Johnston and illustrated by Ben Templesmith, published from March to September 2008 by the American company Image Comics. The comic was compiled into a graphic novel and released online as a motion comic. It is a prequel to the 2008 survival horror video game of the same name, detailing the five weeks leading up to the destruction of a space colony on the planet Aegis VII following the discovery of an artifact called the Marker.

The comic series began production during development of the video game as part of Electronic Art's multimedia expansion of the plot referred to by staff as "IP cubed". Reception of the comic series has been generally positive, with several journalists praising its writing and artwork. All issues ranked in the top 300 sales charts compiled by Diamond Comic Distributors; the first issue sold over 6,000 copies, while subsequent issues saw sales of between 3,000 and 5,000 copies during their publication months.

== Publication history ==
The 2008 survival horror video game Dead Space began production in 2006 at EA Redwood Shores, based on creator Glen Schofield's wish to create the most frightening horror game possible. Alongside the game, the universe of Dead Space was expanded into a multimedia narrative described as "IP cubed"; it extended across the game, the animated movie Dead Space: Downfall, and the limited comic series. While each part of the media expansion was handled by different people, the game's development team acted as the overall controller, ensuring continuity between each property. The comic was written by Antony Johnston, who was later one of the scenario writers for the video game. Johnston was well known at the time for his work on both original series such as Wasteland, and adaptations including graphic novels of the Alex Rider novels by Anthony Horowitz. The series was illustrated by Ben Templesmith, who had gained fame for his work on Wasteland, Fell and 30 Days of Night.

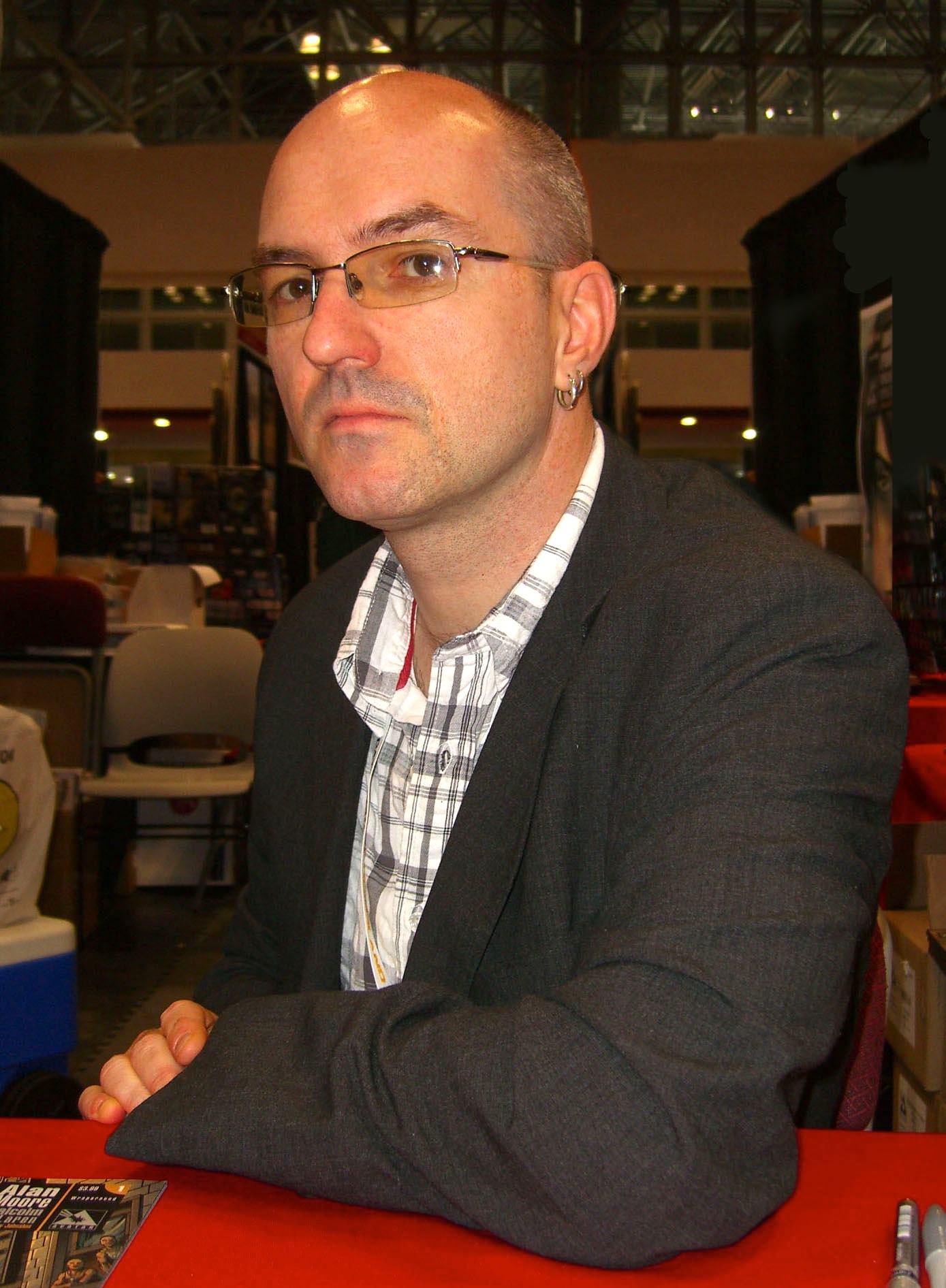
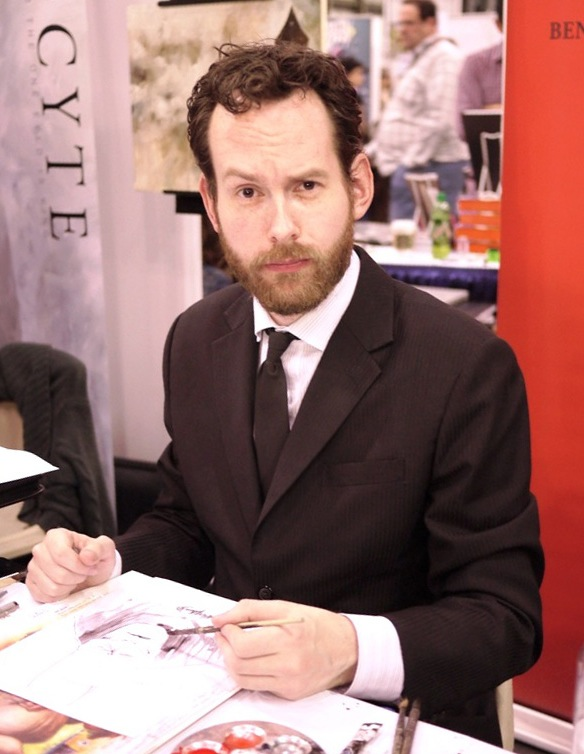
Writer Antony Johnston (left) and artist Ben Templesmith (right); both had worked together on several projects before collaborating on Dead Space.

Johnston was recommended to the project by Warren Ellis, who also served as one of the game's writers. He was first attracted to the project due to its focus on psychological horror over gore, comparing it to his favorite video game Silent Hill. The job was settled once Johnston and the game's publisher Electronic Arts were in agreement on the direction of the project. Johnston described the whole process up to the contract stage as "a bit of a whirlwind". The storyline used multiple points of view to tell its story, an approach inspired by its location on a human colony. Although it used an ensemble cast, each character was "more or less individual" with no team dynamic until the characters Abraham Neumann and Marla Janssen near the story's end. He estimated that around 80 to 90% of the comic was standalone, with the remaining percentage linking back into the game. Both properties were separate so people could enjoy them independently, though the wider backstory elements were present across all media to establish continuity.

Templesmith was brought on board by Johnston, who believed Templesmith's art suited the comic's planned visual direction. The two had previously collaborated on Wasteland and an untitled experimental comic in the early 2000s. Johnston and Electronic Arts approached Templesmith separately, and he accepted. The overseeing team did not try to keep the presentation uniform across all media, and while Templemith was given design guidelines he was otherwise allowed to draw the comic as he liked. As with 30 Days of Night, he used color coding for different scenes and moods; the planet surface used blue-grey, while the colony interior used warmer shades. Its dark tone partially arose from its horror roots, as more traditional comic artwork—using high lighting and color use—would lessen that aspect. He visited the development team to view their Necromorph designs, choosing ones he liked to incorporate into the narrative.

The comic was announced in February 2008 as part of the collaboration between Electronic Arts and American publisher Image Comics. The first issue released on March 3. A limited edition with alternate cover art released was available as a signed giveaway at that year's WonderCon. The sixth and final issue released during mid-September. In December, as part of their collaboration with Image Comics, website Newsarama digitally published the first issue for free. A graphic novel compiling all six issues was published by Image Comics on November 20. It included exclusive art by Templesmith, an art section, and in-universe character biographies. The graphic novel version was re-released by Titan Books on February 5, 2013. This edition included a standalone comic, originally written to promote the spin-off game Dead Space: Extraction, again written by Johnston and illustrated by Templesmith. This issue focused on Nicole Brennan, a key character in the Dead Space narrative during the events of Extraction. The comic series was adapted into a motion comic, released through the game's website between April and October 2008. It was later included as an unlockable extra in Dead Space: Extraction.

== Plot ==
The plot of Dead Space takes place in the year 2508, centuries after humanity narrowly escaped extinction due to resource depletion by "cracking" planets to extract their resources in a three-year process. The story begins during the second year of an illegal mining operation on the planet Aegis VII funded by the Unitology religious movement. The colonists discover a monolith-like artifact on Aegis VII they identify as a Marker, an object sacred to the Unitologists' beliefs. In reality, the Marker is a copy of an alien object that begins to have a fatal influence over the colony; this culminates in the colony's destruction by reanimated mutated corpses referred to outside the comic as "Necromorphs".

The comic opens with a video log from Sergeant Abraham Neumann of the colony's P-SEC security, advising anyone still alive to nuke the planet. The story then jumps back five weeks to shortly after the Marker's discovery. While the colony was previously stable, the Marker's discovery prompts a wave of unusual incidents; beginning first as prevalent insomnia and hallucinations, many colonists then display symptoms of paranoia and become murderously violent. One of the colonists attacks medical officer Tom Sciarello, killing his assistant in the process. The Unitologists in the colony exacerbate the situation, as they attempt to worship at the Marker site. One of their number is Neumann's P-SEC partner Vera Cortez, and her beliefs and gradual decline drive a wedge between them. Marla Janssen, another P-SEC officer, becomes fascinated by symbols on the Marker seen on a leaked video. The colony leader Hanford Carthusia is given orders from the Unitology Church to safeguard the Marker until their ship, the Ishimura arrives.

Between its discovery and the Ishimura's arrival, the situation deteriorates further; Sciarello treats a growing and increasingly severe outbreak of hysteria and paranoia on the colony, technician Cameron finds an unusual organic matter growing in the vent system, and one of the Marker security team Natalia Deshyanov kills a crewmember and suffers a complete breakdown. Carthusia, under orders from the Church, refuses to act and instead brings the Marker into the colony preparatory to sending both it and the colony's recent dead to the Ishimura. The Marker's approach prompts a mass suicide of Unitologists, among them Cortez. When the Ishimura arrives, the Marker is transported up. Things seem to calm down, but the colonists' mental state further deteriorates and Cameron continues to find organic material in greater quantities. Deshyanov is now insane, writing the Marker symbols on her walls. Neumann shows the writing to Janssen, and she interprets the Marker symbols as a code similar to the structure of DNA. The Ishimura captain, Benjamin Mathius refuses to allow any colonists—including Carthusia—aboard due to the deteriorating situation. Carthusia withholds the bodies of the suicides in response.

At the moment of the planetcrack, the colony's power fails and communications shut down. Cameron is killed by a Necromorph in the vents, while Neumann finds Janssen before they discover the P-SEC staff slaughtered. Janssen reveals that the Marker symbols are code for a virus that infects and mutates dead bodies. They are then attacked by the P-SEC bodies as they are changed into Necromorphs. The Necromorphs attack the colony, killing many including Carthusia and Sciarello, and converting the suicides. The survivors' desperate attempts to escape result in an overloaded shuttle crashing into the shuttle bay, destroying the remaining shuttles. Neumann and Janssen head for the communication tower, but discover a mass of organic matter—including the converted body of Cortez—has clogged the system. Janssen sacrifices herself to save Neumann from the Necromorphs. Deshyanov meanwhile leaves the colony for the planetcrack crater; and upon seeing something in the crater, jumps to her death. The story ends with Neumann concluding his video log; unhinged by recent events, he walks away from the camera telling whoever finds it not to look for him.

== Reception ==
The first issue of Dead Space appeared in the top 300 best-selling comics for that month compiled by Diamond Comic Distributors, achieving sales of over 6,800 copies. The next four issues sold between 3000 and 5000 copies. The final issue sold over 4,300 copies.

Critics generally praised the comic; a quote from Johnston's website taken from the media outlet Examiner.com praised its narrative delivery and depth. Reviewing the first issue, IGN's Richard George found both the artwork and the narrative overly derivative despite their combined strength. David Norman of website Clandestine Critic reviewed the graphic novel release. He enjoyed the slow build-up to the comic's finale, and noted that Templesmith's artwork helped reinforce the dark atmosphere. In his review of Dead Space: Extraction, The Daily Telegraph's Nick Cowen said the motion comic version was "narrated with some fantastic voice-acting".

In a feature about the first issue's Newsarama publication, Ars Technica's Michael Thompson said that "the comics are excellent and feature an eerie and well-paced story", citing them as superior to the animated film Dead Space: Downfall. In a retrospective piece on the printed media of the Dead Space series, James Floyd Kelly of Wired called it "a perfect companion" to the original game and the perfect introduction to its fictional universe. In a similar article for PopMatters, David Main was far less positive, calling Johnston's narrative difficult to follow and faulting Templesmith's art as making all characters alike and being too cartoon-like for the levels of violence portrayed. Play, as part of an article on Dead Space 3, called the comic a "nicely-produced series".
