= Wolverine: Prodigal Son =

Original English-language manga

Wolverine: Prodigal Son is an original English-language manga written by Antony Johnston with art by Wilson Tortosa published by Del Rey Manga in 2009. Only one volume was released, the second one has been canceled.
