= CSR Classics =

2013 video game

- Developers: Boss Alien Ltd, Mad Atom Games
- Publisher: NaturalMotion Games
- Platforms: iOS, Android
- Release: October 17, 2013
- Genre: Racing

CSR Classics is a free-to-play drag-racing game by Boss Alien in collaboration with Mad Atom Games and published by NaturalMotion Games. In the game, the player takes the role of a new racer looking to make a name for themselves in a city resembling Las Vegas, which is ruled by five racing "crews". The storyline consists of a racer with their agent trying to prove the seemingly corrupt Mr. Baladin of his guilt, who has worked their way into a business magnate behind the scenes.

CSR Classics is the follow-up title to the successful game CSR Racing (and the first game in the series) and was released in October 2013 on iOS. At the end of March 2014, it was gradually released on Android via Google Play. CSR Classics features game mechanics similar to its sister title (CSR Racing, released in 2012), but features classic and older race cars ranging from the 1950s to the 1980s.

In late March 2018, it was announced that online features of CSR Classics would be discontinued on May 1, 2018; the online features of the game were later discontinued with an update on May 21, 2018. Since then, CSR Classics has always been limited to offline gameplay.

Around 2023, it was reported that some users were unable to play the game, as the game messaged players with a message asking for a permission that does not exist, which read: "Storage: Loading all necessary game data".

== Plot ==
The player starts off by being recruited by an agent, and receives a sum of money sufficient to purchase the first vehicle. As the player challenges the first crew, Authenthics, the Agent explains her suspicion of Mr. Baledin, who recently became the top crew leader and purchased a casino The Valentine. She thinks that Mr. Baledin is a corrupt person and that the crew leaders have some involvement with his reign of power. The agent reveals Marco to be a tearaway child and a thief, while also having a romantic affair with another crew leader, Kandy. The player proceeds to defeat Marco, progressing to Tier 2.

In Tier 2, the player proceeds to challenge the Thrillers, commandeered by Olivia. As the player continues to challenge Olivia, the agent tells the player about Olivia's background: Olivia runs a car show under the same name, which, after having experienced severe financial troubles, came to Mr. Baledin for a loan. However, the loan did little to help their financial situation, and Olivia's car show became in debt to Mr. Baledin. Olivia and her associates agreed to race for Mr. Baledin to make up for the loss. The player defeats Olivia and the Thrillers, moving onto Tier 3.

The player starts challenging Lord Aziz and the High Rollers, the Tier 3 crew. After having beaten Lord Aziz's crew and starting to challenge Lord Aziz himself, the agent informs the player of Lord Aziz: Lord Aziz inherited the wealth of his father, who recently passed. Being a large gambler, Lord Aziz lost all of his father's wealth playing Baccarat, and blamed Mr. Baledin for having rigged his Baccarat games. Despite now working under Mr. Baledin's rule, Lord Aziz highly despises Mr. Baledin. The player defeats Lord Aziz and the High Rollers, now having made it into Tier 4.

The player's next crew to defeat is the Tier 4 crew, the Lucky 7's, with Kandy being its ringleader. The player defeats Kandy's crew members and proceeds to challenge her. The agent shines light upon Kandy: despite her romantic relationship with Marco, Kandy has been seen multiple times flirting with Mr. Baledin. It is later revealed that Marco and Kandy performed a heist on The Valentine itself, with Mr. Baledin having caught the duo. Instead of alerting them to authorities, Mr. Baledin blackmailed Kandy and Marco into working for him. The player defeats Kandy for the last time and proceeds into Tier 5.

In Tier 5, the player starts challenging The House, which is under Mr. Baledin's rule. The player defeats Mr. Baledin's crew and starts to challenge the leader of the CSR Classics universe by themselves. The agent informs the player of a plan to arrest Mr. Baledin: the player would distract Baledin by continuously racing him, allowing authorities to prepare a trap at The Valentine for Mr. Baledin, allowing for an easy arrest. After defeating Mr. Baledin for the third and final time, Mr. Baledin is shown in custody. The agent then talks with the player, informing them that the CSR Classics league unanimously elected Marco to become the new leader of the league, vowing to ameliorate it. The player is also congratulated by the former crew leaders for their victory against the secretly despised Mr. Baledin. However, the player is shown a discussion between a now-jailed Mr. Baledin, and a formerly unknown client. They discuss how their plan was executed perfectly, and it is revealed that Marco, on the other end of the line, is actually behind all this business.

== Gameplay ==
CSR Classics's single-player component is split into five tiers, with each tier introducing progressively faster opposition and vehicles. Before the player gets to challenge the boss for that level, the player must first beat the boss' crew. To move on to a new tier, the player must race and beat the crew boss for the level. After beating the boss of each level three times, the player will be challenged to a high-stakes rematch. If the player wins the race, they are awarded the boss's car and the car is one tier above the tier your in; however, if the player loses, they must give back the prize gold won from the previous boss race. Unlike a traditional racing game, CSR Classics does not feature steering, braking, or acceleration controls. Instead, the game focuses on timing gear changes and the use of the nitrous upgrade by tapping the screen, in a similar fashion to a rhythm game.

When a player comes to buy a car, they can choose between unloved and loved cars. Unloved cars are fully stock and rusty versions, with no upgrades whereas Loved cars are almost fully restored and some starter performance upgrades, but you can only buy these cars with gold. Most unloved cars can be purchased with cash.

The races are split into several categories, such as regulation races (they require the players to meet certain conditions, like having a nitrous system installed), ladder races (the player must gradually rise to the top of the ladder, by beating opponents that become progressively more difficult to defeat, with gradually increasing payouts), Daily Battles (represent the races with a loaned car, where the player is racing against an opponent utilizing the same car, and they can only be performed a maximum of three times per day), Restriction Races (they give restrictions of which the player must abide by, such as not being able to use nitrous oxide or requiring to race with their car weighing a certain amount), Manufacturer-specific and Car-specific races (they are strictly limited to cars from a certain manufacturer, or just one car in question), Crew Battle (these races revolve around the crew associated with the current tier the player is participating in. With each race, the player is permitted to challenge a crew member, or the crew leader itself. If the player defeats all four crew members, the player will have access to challenge the crew leader personally. If the player defeats the crew leader three times, the player is declared as having officially beaten the crew and can progress to the next tier), High Stakes Challenges (can be attended once per tier, with each one becoming available after the player defeats the Crew leader of that tier, with the reward for winning being the crew leader's car).

== Reception ==
CSR Classics received "mixed or average" reviews, according to video game review aggregator platform Metacritic.
