= Hercules (1997 video game) =

1997 video game

- North American Microsoft Windows cover art
- Developers: Eurocom Entertainment Software (PlayStation, Microsoft Windows); Tiertex Design Studios (Game Boy)
- Publishers: NA: Virgin Interactive (PS); EU: Sony Computer Entertainment (PS); NA: Majesco (PS 1.1 Re-Release); Disney Interactive (Microsoft Windows); THQ (Game Boy)
- Producers: Craig Allen (PlayStation, Microsoft Windows); Jon Osborn (Game Boy)
- Programmers: Ian Denny (PlayStation, Microsoft Windows); Chris Brunning (Game Boy)
- Composers: Steve Duckworth (PlayStation, Microsoft Windows); Mark Ortiz (Game Boy)
- Platforms: PlayStation; Microsoft Windows; Game Boy
- Release: NA: July 3, 1997; NA: July 15, 1997 (GB); EU: November 14, 1997; NA: 1998 (PS 1.1 Re-Release)
- Genres: Action-adventure; Hack and slash; Platform
- Mode: Single-player

Hercules (also known as Disney's Hercules, Disney's Hercules Action Game, Hercules Action Game, Disney's Action Game Featuring Hercules, and Disney's Action Game Featuring Disney's Hercules in Europe) is a 1997 platform-action video game developed by Eurocom Entertainment Software. It is based on the 1997 film of the same name. It was released on the PlayStation and Microsoft Windows, along with a different version developed by Tiertex Design Studios for the Game Boy released by THQ the same year.

== Plot ==
The game follows the same storyline as the animated film. Hercules, son of Zeus, is stripped of his godhood and must prove that he is a true hero in order to regain his immortality, and join Zeus and the other gods on Mount Olympus. To do that, Hercules must pass several tasks and defeat many villains, and in the end, face Hades, the ruler of the underworld, who is also responsible for Hercules' loss of immortality.

== Gameplay ==
The game is mainly two-dimensional, although the player can walk to other planes via pathways or stairs in many missions. There are ten levels and three difficulty modes: Beginner, Medium, and Herculean. The last two levels are playable only on Medium and Herculean difficulties. There are three rush levels in the game in which the player must run forward through the map and avoid obstacles without being able to stop or fight.

The player's health can be increased by picking up Hercules Action Figures and drinking Herculade cups found throughout the game. The player's main weapon is the sword; Hercules can also punch, but this is a much more difficult way to defeat enemies. Temporary weapon power-ups, known as "Gifts of the Gods", can be found throughout the game. These include the Lightning Sword, which shoots lightning in whichever direction Hercules aims; the Fireball Sword, which shoots fireballs that seek out onscreen enemies; the Sonic Sword, which affects enemy targets at close range with a circular sonic blast; and the cap of invisibility, which grants the player a few seconds of invulnerability when activated. Power-ups have limited action, and once their energy has depleted, they can no longer be used.

In many levels, there are hidden letters that, if collected, will form the word HERCULES and allow the player to spawn directly at the next level, instead of starting the game over from the beginning. There are also four hidden vases in each mission that, upon collection, will give the player a password save for the current level. Most of the bosses cannot be defeated by conventional fighting and require the player to perform special actions to pass. Among the enemies that Hercules faces are Nessus the Centaur, the Minotaur, the Harpies, the Hydra, the Stymphalian birds, the Thebans, skeleton warriors, Medusa, Hades, several Titans, and a Cyclops.

== Re-releases ==
The PlayStation version of the game was re-released by Majesco in 1998 with an E rating (which replaced the ESRB's "Kids to Adults" rating the same year) and the words "Action Game" removed from the title.

The PlayStation version of the game was re-released as a PSOne Classic on the PlayStation Store on March 8, 2011. The PC version of the game was re-released on GOG.com and Steam on May 17, 2019.

== Reception ==
Reception

Aggregate score
Aggregator	Score
GameRankings	80% (PS1) (based on four reviews)

Review scores
Publication	Score
Electronic Gaming Monthly	8.25/10 (PS1)
GameSpot	7.6/10 (PS1)
Next Generation	2/5 (PS1)

The game divided critics. Whether a review gave a positive or negative recommendation largely hinged on the reviewer's opinion of the game's use of stereotypical last-generation gameplay with modern elements. GameSpot, for example, described Disney's Hercules as a sort of greatest hit of the "16-bit" Disney titles, incorporating the best elements of those games while still having enough advances to take it "to the 32-bit level", and accordingly concluded it to be a must-have. Dan Hsu of Electronic Gaming Monthly similarly said that "Hercules takes everything you liked from old side-scrolling classics and gives them a big 32-bit boost". On the other side, Next Generation said it "follows the style set out by every single side-scrolling action title of the 16-bit era, so much so in fact that it feels like a Genesis game: walk from left to right, hacking at centaurs and other mythological creatures with a sword. It's all been done before, and done better as well". He noted that there were modern gameplay elements but found them to be largely superficial. GamePro similarly remarked, "The main problem is that we've all played this game before, just with different dressings."

Most critics applauded the game's mixture of polygons and sprites, both for the high quality of those elements and the way they were seamlessly integrated with each other. GamePro partially disagreed, citing severe pixelation, but acknowledged that the hand-drawn animation is impressive. The usage of music and voices from the film was also widely praised.

At the 1999 Milia festival in Cannes, Hercules took home a "Gold" prize for revenues above €15 million in the European Union during 1998.
