= CSR Racing =

2012 video game

- The App icon of the iOS and Android game CSR Racing in its 3rd Anniversary depicting a Lamborghini Huracán
- Developers: Boss Alien Ltd, Zynga
- Publisher: NaturalMotion Games
- Platforms: iOS, OS X, Android, Microsoft Windows
- Release: June 28, 2012 (CSR Racing); June 29, 2016 (CSR2); January 18, 2024 beta release, cancelled full release (CSR3)
- Genre: Racing

App icon of CSR Racing 2

Custom Street Racing, commonly known as CSR Racing, is a 2012 free-to-play drag-racing video game by Boss Alien and NaturalMotion Games. In the video game, the player takes the role of a new racer looking to gain fame in a deserted city that is being ruled by five racing "crews". A sequel to CSR Racing was released on iOS and Android on June 29, 2016, officially titled CSR Racing 2. The next game in the CSR Racing series early access as beta was released in Malaysia in January 2024, called "CSR Racing 3".

CSR Racing was first shown on stage at the Apple Worldwide Developers Conference (WWDC) on June 11, 2012 and was subsequently released on the Apple App Store on iOS on June 28, 2012. It was revealed that the game made over $12 million in a month shortly after launch, making it one of the top ten grossing iPhone mobile games of 2012.

It is available for both Mac and iOS devices. On April 15, 2013, CSR Racing was made available for Android phones and tablets. On October 5, 2013, CSR Racing received a new follow-up game, officially titled CSR Classics, for iOS.

The online features of CSR Racing were discontinued with an update on May 21, 2018.

== Gameplay ==
CSR Racing's single-player component is split into five tiers, with each tier introducing progressively faster opposition and vehicles. To move on to a new tier, the player must race and beat the crew boss for the level. After beating the boss of each level, the player will be challenged to a high-stakes rematch. If the player wins the race, they are awarded the boss's car; however, if the player loses, they must give back the gold won from the previous boss race. Unlike a traditional racing game, CSR Racing does not feature steering, braking or acceleration controls. Instead, the game focuses on timing gear changes and use of the nitrous upgrade by tapping the screen, in a similar fashion to a rhythm game. Races take place across either a quarter- or half-mile distance, depending on the event in which the player has chosen to compete. These events range from repeatable Regulation Races, which are split into three different difficulties (Rookie, Amateur, Pro), to direct confrontations against rival crew members. After a player has beaten a rival crew member, a race cannot be replayed. The game features several other race modes such as "Daily Battle," where the player drives a random car for a single race, and "Restriction Races," where cars must meet certain specified criteria.

Regulation races award the player with a fixed amount of money immediately. They are divided into Rookie, Amateur, and Pro. The Amateur and Pro Regulation Races in tier 1 are unlocked by beating the first two crew members in Fangz, Luther, and Alesha. In other tiers, they are available by default. Their amount starts from $500+. The amount of money awarded can be enhanced by decals, perfect shifts, perfect starts, good shifts, and higher tiers. Unlike other events, players can use vehicles from any tier for a Regulation Race of any tier. For example, a Tier 5 car can compete in a Tier 2 regulation race.

Ladder races pit the player's car against progressively tougher opponents for gradually more money. There are 24 Ladder races in each tier. The last three races are considered quarter-final, semi-final, and final. These award more money than regular ladder races. Theoretically, a player who wins the finals can beat the crew leader.

Daily Battles are races with a loaned car that can be done several times per day; players win increasing amounts of money or gold if they win every day. The player must wait four hours after finishing a Daily Battle to be able to race in another.

Restriction races impose a condition to the car for the races. They are available tier 2 onwards but tier 1 restriction races can be unlocked when a player has beaten tier 5.

In World Tour (T6) a new type of restriction was unlocked which involved all challenges for a certain car required for the crew but involved an extra car which is not from the crew but the manufacturer was of the same country or region. Veloci Crew had the Alfa Romeo 4C, Armada Crew had the Mercedes-Benz C63 AMG and Spitfire Crew had the Jaguar F-Type. Rushmore Crew had the Ford Mustang Boss 302 Laguna Seca.

Challenge races are unlocked when a player wins tier 4, and blocked when they pass tier 5. These are some difficult and rare races but with large cash prizes. They tend to appear randomly. It is not available for Android.

Car-specific races put a single car into the race and are available tier 3 and up. They can be unlocked for all tiers when a player beats tier 5.

Manufacturer races only allow cars from a single manufacturer. They are available only in tier 4.

Crew battles consist of a race against one of the 4 crew racers. By beating them one by one, the player gains access to the crew leader. After beating the crew leader three times, one moves up to the next tier.

Winning races earns the player cash, which can be spent upgrading various parts of their cars, decals that earn cash bonuses per race, or buying a new vehicle from the 'Car Dealer'. There is also a second currency called Gold that the player can use to purchase special cars, decals, skip delivery times for new upgrades, and instantly 'refuel' their cars. Gold is obtained by leveling up, winning tier boss or in-app purchase.

The Power, Weight, Grip, and Gearbox stats have a dramatic effect on how the car behaves in races. Heavier cars with low grip will accelerate slowly at first but will achieve a very high top speed at the end of the race. Examples of these are the Bentley Continental GT V8 (Tier 3), the Trion Nemesis RR (Tier 5) and the Dodge Charger R/T (Tier 2). Cars that have low power and low weight will accelerate off the line quickly, but can be caught by heavier, more powerful cars. Examples of these are the Alfa Romeo 4C (Tier 2), the Alfa Romeo TZ3 (Tier 4) and the McLaren F1 GT (Tier 4). Lighter cars can also be used to pull off quicker times, especially in 1/4 mile races.

=== World Tour ===
On September 18, 2014, CSR Racing added a new campaign called the "World Tour". There are five different crews for the racers to race. These are Italy, UK, Europe, the US, and the International. Beating a crew earns the player a hypercar (along with the special livery if the player won the High Stakes Challenge).

The first crew is the Veloci (Italian) crew, and every crew member has a Ferrari. The LaFerrari will be rewarded after the player beats the crew members. La Stella's LaFerrari will be obtained after the player has won the High Stakes Challenge. The second crew is the Armada crew (European). After the player beats all crew members, the Bugatti Veyron Vitesse will be given. Pierre-Yassine's Veyron will be obtained after the player has beaten him in the High Stakes Challenge. The third crew is the USA crew. After the player has beaten all crew members, the player will be awarded the Saleen S7 Twin Turbo. BOSS X's Saleen S7 Twin Turbo will be obtained if the player has won the High Stakes Challenge. The fourth and final crew is the Spitfire Crew (British). After all four crew members are defeated, the player is awarded the McLaren P1 GTR. Shifty Jack's P1 GTR will be obtained after the player defeats him in the High Stakes Challenge.

After the player has beaten a World Tour crew and obtained the boss cars, they can start The International. All crews will need to be beaten and the boss cars won in order to complete The International. The International has four events: Bull Run, The Hunt, Power Play, and Air Strike. The boss is Zoe Cross for Bull Run, Le Sapeur for The Hunt, Ivan for Power Play, and Cypher for Air Strike.

After completing the 4 cups, La Finale will be unlocked by defeating the crew bosses from Tiers 1–5. After defeating them, the player can face Nitro in the Grand Finale. If the player manages to defeat him, a cutscene will reveal that Nitro has been a part of The International crew and was the inventor of CSR Racing. He also fires Roman for messing with the stages. He thanks the player for taking part in the game and as a reward give the Ferrari FXX-K's Pro decals. He then challenges the player to race him in a final High Stakes Challenge for Nitro's FXX-K.

=== Modes ===
World Tour has three new gameplay modes. The player may set the difficulty higher for bigger prizes.

==== Match Race ====
Races matched to the player's current car set-up. The difficulty of the race is not decreased by upgrading the car as in regulation races.

1. Easy, rival's PP is two points lower than the player's.
2. Medium, rival's PP is equal to the player's.
3. Hard, rival's PP is two points higher than the player's (unless the player's performance is maxed, then rival's PP is also maxed and their shifting is upped to a more challenging state).

==== Test Drive ====
Race in a car from the dealer. In this mode, the decal bonus is that of the car from the dealer, not that of the player's car.

==== Payback ====
Another chance to win Boss Cars via High Stakes Challenges and race crew members from Tiers 1-5 and World Tour who the player has already raced with. They have increased PP Ratings than their previous races in the Crew Battles.

== Development ==
BossAlien was formed by ex-employees of Black Rock Studio (Pure, Split/Second) in June, 2011. Following the release of the game, BossAlien was purchased by NaturalMotion Games for an undisclosed fee, and now operates as the company's Brighton development studio. In January 2014, NaturalMotion was acquired by Zynga for $527 Million.

== Reception ==
Reception

Aggregate score
Aggregator	Score
Metacritic	67/100

Aggregate review website Metacritic assigned a score of 67/100 based on reviews from 6 critics.

Media reception to CSR Racing has been generally positive, with Modojo awarding it 4/5 and Gamezebo describing its visuals as "better than some games from the previous console generation (Xbox 360, PS3, and Wii)". Other outlets like Pocket Gamer criticized the implementation of in-app purchases, describing the game's gas system as "an unpardonable grasp for cash", but adding that it was "an accessible and fun racing game."

== Sequels ==
- CSR Classics (2013) – iOS, Android
- CSR Racing 2 (2016) – iOS, Android
- CSR Racing 3 (2024 early access, cancelled full release) – iOS, Android
