= Dead Space: Extraction =

2009 video game

- North American Wii box art
- Developers: Visceral Games; Eurocom
- Publisher: Electronic Arts
- Directors: David Yee; Wright Bagwell
- Producer: Neil Casini
- Designer: John Calhoun
- Artist: Jonathan Hackett
- Writer: Antony Johnston
- Composer: Jason Graves
- Series: Dead Space
- Platforms: Wii, PlayStation 3
- Release: Wii: AU: September 24, 2009; EU: September 25, 2009; NA: September 29, 2009; PlayStation 3: NA: January 25, 2011; EU: January 27, 2011; AU: January 28, 2011
- Genre: Rail shooter
- Modes: Single-player, multiplayer

Dead Space: Extraction is a 2009 rail shooter co-developed by Visceral Games and Eurocom and published by Electronic Arts for the Wii. A port for PlayStation 3 was released in 2011 alongside Dead Space 2. A spin-off within the Dead Space series and a prequel to the original game, the story follows survivors from the Aegis VII mining colony as the planet and newly-arrived ship USG Ishimura is overrun by deadly monsters called Necromorphs. Gameplay involves going through scripted sequences with different characters, using assigned weapons to kill Necromorphs by severing their limbs. Each version respectively supported the Wii Zapper and PlayStation Move peripherals.

Conceived during the development of Dead Space, production began in 2008 using Eurocom's EngineX game engine. Electronic Arts treated it as a test for mature games in the Wii gaming market. The aim was to create a survival horror experience within the genre and hardware limitations. The script was written by Antony Johnston, who worked on the original game and its expanded media. Jason Graves and Don Veca respectively returned as composer and audio director. The original release met with poor sales but good reviews, with critics praising its gameplay and use of the Dead Space setting while faulting pacing issues and a lack of content. Reviewers of the PS3 port praised its Move usage, but faulted the low graphical quality.

== Gameplay ==
The player engages a Necromorph.

Dead Space: Extraction is a science fiction rail shooter and is viewed from a first-person perspective. Taking the role of multiple characters across the campaign, the player navigates through the Aegis VII colony and the mining ship Ishimura from a first-person cinematic perspective. The original Wii version controls using the Wii Remote and Nunchuk, incorporating both motion controls and an option to use the Wii Zapper. In the PlayStation 3 (PS3) port, the controls are altered to support both the DualShock controller and PlayStation Move. In contrast to the diegetic UI design of the original game, players can press a controller button to display weapon slots, current ammunition and health in the screen corners.

The campaign is split into ten chapters, with progress dictated by the narrative, though in some sections the player is allowed to freely direct the camera or choose routes through environments. The narrative is told in real-time, using a combination of in-engine cutscenes, and video and audio logs picked up within the environment. Gameplay is similar to a light gun shooter; enemies approach the player and are shot using the equipped weapon. The main enemies of the game, Necromorphs, can only be killed by severing their limbs. Up to ten weapons can be found, with two different firing modes per gun. The default Rivet Gun, which has unlimited ammunition, is always set to one of the weapon slots. The others are filled with weapons picked up during progress through a level. Two abilities used by the player are Stasis, which slows object motion for a short time, and Kinesis, which allows the player character to pick up and throw or move objects.

Each chapter gives players a rating based on their performance, awarding stars used to upgrade the player's abilities and weapons. Upgrades and ammunition can also be found within the environment. There are four difficulty modes, with the lowest being "Normal" and the highest being "Impossible". The two highest difficulties are unlocked upon completing the campaign. Both versions of Extraction feature local cooperative multiplayer. Players can drop in at any point during both the campaign and the challenge missions. Both players can take down Necromorphs, take turns on puzzles, and divide between different tasks during certain set pieces.

== Synopsis ==
=== Setting and characters ===
Dead Space: Extraction takes place in the year 2508, centuries after humanity narrowly escaped extinction due to resource depletion by "cracking" planets to extract their resources in a three-year process. The events of Extraction play out prior to the events of Dead Space, and in parallel to the prequel comic and the tie-in movie Dead Space: Downfall. During the second year of an illegal mining operation on the planet Aegis VII funded by the Church of Unitology, the colonists discover a monolith-like artifact they identify as a Marker, an object sacred to the Unitologists' beliefs. In reality, the Marker is a copy of an alien object that triggers the destruction of both the colony and the associated mining ship USG Ishimura using reanimated mutated corpses referred to as "Necromorphs".

The game follows several characters as they escape the Aegis VII colony onto the Ishimura. They are colony detective Nathan McNeill; Ishimura soldier Gabe Weller, who is less affected by the Marker; Lexine Murdoch, a colony resident who can likewise resist the Marker's influence and softens its impact on those close to her; Warren Eckhardt, an executive from the Ishimura; and Ishimura doctor Karen Hollwell. The opening section follows Sam Caldwell, an Aegis VII miner. Nicole Brennan, a central character from Dead Space, appears as a supporting character.

=== Plot ===
A team from the Aegis VII colony including Sam Caldwell transport the Marker into the colony. During the transport, the crew suffer hallucinations, and Caldwell kills his teammates when they seemingly go mad and attack him. After receiving a call from his fiancée Lexine about a mass suicide of Unitologists, Caldwell is shot dead by a security squad led by McNeill, who perceived his behaviour as an insane rampage.

A week later, as McNeill is investigating recent similar incidents, Weller arrives and asks for his help securing the bodies of the suicides. After reaching the morgue to find it empty, they find the colony's residents going insane, forcing them to repel the colonists and growing numbers of Necromorphs. The pair find Lexine and later Eckhardt, witnessing a shuttle crash destroying all the colony shuttles and trapping the colonists on the planet.

The group escapes the colony on Eckhardt's private shuttle, though they are forced to spacewalk when the Ishimura shoots their shuttle down. They are captured and quarantined as the Necromorph infection has spread to the Ishimura. As the Ishimura is being overrun, the group are released by Nicole Brennan, who stays in the medical center to help survivors, while the rest try to escape. In the sewage system, Lexine is attacked by a swarm of small Necromorphs and presumed dead, but she is rescued by Karen Howell. Howell, suffering from Marker-induced hallucinations, eventually confronts a solitary Eckhardt and accuses him of working for the Unitologists. When Howell is attacked by a Necromorph, Eckhardt leaves her to die, though he tells the others she sacrificed herself for their safety. The four split up in pairs to find a usable shuttle, as all escape pods have launched and trapped the surviving crew.

During their mission, McNeill and Lexine see a transmission showing Nicole committing suicide. Weller finds a shuttle, then discovers Eckhardt's duplicity through a video message. Eckhardt wounds Weller and reveals his intention to bring Lexine to the Unitologists due to her ability to resist and block the Marker's influence, but he is immediately killed by a Necromorph. McNeill, himself suffering from the Marker's effects, shuts down the ship's asteroid cannons so the shuttle can leave unharmed, but an encounter with a large Necromorph forces him to amputate his arm. McNeill, Weller and Lexine escape on the shuttle, but are unable to stop the USG Kellion responding to the Ishimura's distress signal. In a post-credits scene, Lexine is forced to kill McNeill who becomes a Necromorph.

== Development ==
Dead Space: Extraction was co-developed by EA Redwood Shores (later Visceral Games), creators of the survival horror video game Dead Space; and Eurocom, a European development studio. Producer Steve Papoutsis created the concept for Extraction, wanting to create an original title for the Wii and give players of the original game further story content. The Wii was chosen as the platform due to its innovative features, including motion controls. Its genre was chosen based on the design and limitations of the Wii hardware. The Redwood Shores development team spent much of the production at Eurocom's studios in Derby, England. Eurocom were eager to create a high-quality title using the Dead Space licence. Production began in 2008 and took roughly fourteen months, the process being simplified by having a pre-established world design and assets.

Extraction was built using EngineX, a game engine created by Eurocom for its gaming titles including Sphinx and the Cursed Mummy. The main focus during production was replicating the atmosphere and design of Dead Space within Extraction despite platform limitations, with new and classic enemies being incorporated. Despite the graphical limitations of the Wii, the team incorporated the original game's enemy designs and created new enemy types. To create a cinematic experience, the team made extensive use of motion capture for its cast. This proved simple as Eurocom had access to an advanced motion capture studio close to their offices. The camera was carried around by one of the actors while the scenes were recorded.

The script was written by Antony Johnston, who had previously worked on the original game and its prequel comic. The storyline was set when Johnston was brought in, though he remained in contact with the team about changes and additions. In contrast to the isolated character views of the comic, the game used an ensemble dynamic. New character Lexine was in place from the outset, designed to be a likeable protagonist. The sequence where McNeill must cut off his own arm came from Eurocom being asked to create a scenario where players would have to make a terrible decision. The heavily-scripted style allowed for better pacing of the story and optional logs, the goal being that players would not run into a battle and be fighting over dialogue and video logs. The team chose to open with the extraction of the Marker's extraction, which acted as a point where the colony's final deterioration begins. The first-person perspective, Wii hardware and switch between different characters allowed more of the Marker's mental impacts to be displayed. The scenario team deviated as little as possible from pre-established events in the original game and expanded media, with late game dialogue tying into the next Dead Space.

While the genre and platform were different, the development team wanted to both replicate and expanded upon the original game's mechanics. Unique elements tied into the motion controls hardware were added, such as the glow worm light and adjusting the aiming reticle using the Wii Remote. So they could properly utilize the controls, team members handled the Wii Remote and Nunchuck as often as possible, and took care to make the game compatible and comfortable with the Wii Zapper. The shift in genre allowed the team to rebalance the difficulty so players would make more use of different weapons compared to Dead Space, with some being redesigned for the Wii. The new Arc Welder weapon, which featured unlimited ammunition, was designed both to as a puzzle element and to give players a fallback weapon. According to designer John Calhoun, the co-op multiplayer was chosen to shift the title into an action-based design, creating situations where one player would fight off the Necromorphs while the second completed an environmental puzzle. A major part of the co-op mode's design was allowing a second player to drop in at any time without interrupting the gameplay. Zero-G sections with dedicated controls were tested, but dropped due to slow pacing and Papoutsis finding the intended controls cumbersome. Other dropped concepts were a health-draining cloaking device, and a blind boss Necromorph.

=== Audio ===
==== Sound and voice acting ====
Don Veca returned as audio director from the original game. The goal of Veca and the sound team was to make Extraction sound better than Dead Space despite hardware limitations. As with the original, the sound design played a key role in creating the horror atmosphere, though due to the genre shift it was more "deterministic" in design and there was greater control over timing. Using both imported sound effects created for the first game, and new sounds created for Extraction, Veca's job was to direct the Eurocom sound team in how to adjust the sound design to fit the Dead Space setting. Eurocom had to expand their engine's sound system to incorporate the Dead Space sound library. Veca was originally skeptical of the project due to the change in genre, but ended up impressed by the final product and Eurocom's efforts regarding it.

When casting, the team wanted the actors to fit both vocally and physically with the game's tone and world design. The cast included both people who enjoyed games and those who had never played a game before. Johnston was present for much of the voice recording, able to give the actors directions on their performances. The game's cast included Laura Pyper as Lexine, who described her character as "a bit of a tough cookie" despite the trauma she suffers; and Jon Cartwright as Eckhardt, who referred to his character as someone in a foreign situation due to his corporate background. Speaking in retrospect, Papoutsis felt that the voice acting was one of the aspects that went well with production. Calhoun estimated that there was five times more spoken dialogue than in Dead Space.

==== Music ====
Jason Graves returned as composer from the original game. As with that game, the soundtrack used layered music which adjusted dynamically based on the in-game situation; Graves heard that it was one of the earliest Wii titles to use multi-track interactive music. Electronic Arts was unwilling to change the musical tone of the series, so little was changed. As the gameplay design was linear, Graves composed the music to be more structured than the original's "open" design with "a sharper focus to its intent". Alongside new tracks, several pieces from the original Dead Space score, together with the ambient mixes used for environmental background, were ported directly into Extraction to ensure an authentic sound. In keeping with its status as a prequel, Graves composed the music to be more calm and melodic at the outset, then close with the style of music used in Dead Space. No soundtrack album was created for the music.

== Release ==
A Dead Space title for the Wii was announced in February 2009 during an investor meeting of franchise publisher Electronic Arts, though its status as either a new game or port of the original was unknown. Its platform and content was officially announced later that same month. According to Jens Uwe Intat, a European Electronic Arts executive, Extraction was being used as a test case by the company to see if there was a profitable market for mature titles on the platform. During production, EA Redwood Shores changed its name to Visceral Games, reflecting their new mature game productions. The company would retain this name until their closure in 2017. It was showcased at E3 2009, scheduled for release during the autumn in North America and Europe. It first released in Australia on September 24, 2009. This was followed by releases in Europe on September 25, and North America on September 29. Electronic Arts also published the game in Japan on October 1, despite the original game going unreleased in the region.

As part of the game's promotion, Johnston and Ben Templesmith created a standalone comic of the same name; Templesmith had previously illustrated the original prequel comic. The comic followed the perspective of Nicole during the events of Extraction up to near her death. The comic was announced in July 2009 for a release in September. As with the original, Electronic Arts partnered with Image Comics to publish the issue. It was later compiled into a graphic novel edition of the prequel comic in 2013. A motion adaptation of the original prequel comic, initially released prior to the first game through its website, was included in Extraction as an unlockable extra.

The game was ported to PS3 as part of the promotion surrounding Dead Space 2. First leaked from the CV of an Electronic Arts employee, it was officially announced in June 2010. Releasing parallel to Dead Space 2 across regions in January 2011, it was both included as part of the Dead Space 2 Limited Edition on PS3 and as a standalone product through the PlayStation Network. While no new story content was added, its visuals were upgraded compared to the Wii release, and standard and motion controls were adapted for the PS3 hardware. Its exclusivity to the PS3 was explained as a combination of compatibility issues with Kinect and Sony's platform being seen as a better fit for the product. Weller and Lexine later featured as playable and lead character respectively in Severed, a standalone downloadable content episode set during Dead Space 2.

== Reception ==
Reception

Aggregate score
Aggregator	Score
Metacritic	(Wii) 82/100 (PS3) 79/100

Review scores
Publication	Score
1Up.com	B+
Computer and Video Games	7/10
Eurogamer	8/10 (Wii/PS3)
Game Informer	7/10
GameSpot	8/10
GameTrailers	7.9/10
IGN	8.5/10 (Wii); 7.5/10 (PS3)
Nintendo Life	9/10
Official Nintendo Magazine	84%
PALGN	8/10

The original Wii release earned a positive score of 82 out of 100 points from review aggregate website Metacritic based on 76 critic reviews. The plot met with general praise, but some noted some weak writing and pacing issues. A lack of horror elements compared to the original Dead Space was also noted. The gameplay was positively received for its design and controls, though its pacing and elements of its UI and camera work were criticised for hampering the experience. Several reviewers also faulted its short length and lack of bonus modes. There was frequent praise for its graphics and environment design, both for pushing the platform's technical limits and accurately recreating the Dead Space universe. The music, sound design and voice acting also met with praise when mentioned.

Nintendo Life's Jon Wahlgren praised the game as an excellent title in its own right, a well-designed rendition of the Dead Space series for the platform, and an engaging edition to the series' story. Fred Dutton of Official Nintendo Magazine was overall positive, with his main complaint being a lack of optional content. Justin Haywald of 1Up.com by contrast praised the amount of unlockable content available going through the narrative and the amount of lore added to the Dead Space universe, and enjoyed the lack of intrusive platform-based features. IGN's Mark Bozon described Extraction as the best of its genre on the platform at the time, and a worthy addition to the Dead Space series that would appeal to both series fans and rail shooter players.

Eurogamer's Kristan Reed had very few negative issues with the game, giving general praise to its mechanical design and presentation. Lark Anderson of GameSpot summarised the game as "a great on-rails experience that brings all of the action and dismemberment of its predecessor to the Nintendo Wii intact." GameTrailers felt the game was worth experiencing for its atmosphere and design, but felt it was overpriced for the amount of content on offer. Michael Kontoudis of PALGN echoed much of the praise surrounding the story, art and design, but disliked its heavily scripted pacing and disliked the boss encounters. Andrew Reiner of Game Informer found the story to be the only full positive, finding issues with the game's other mechanical and graphical elements. Computer and Video Games felt there was a lack of cohesive design in its various elements, praising its art design and graphics but otherwise disliking its story and game design.

The PS3 release received a score of 79 out of 100 from Metacritic based on 7 reviews. Christopher Ingram of Push Square, alongside enjoying the game's content, praised the updates given to the graphics and technical performance, along with the implementation of the Move peripheral. Reviewing the port, Reed lauded the game's availability on a new platform, but noted that the graphical upgrade had emphasised some dated textures. Darren Jones of Play gave praise to its narrative pacing and use of Move, but noted a lack of effort in the HD upgrade. IGN's Greg Miller enjoyed the story and gameplay, but disliked its pacing, and a lack of platform-exclusive features or further enhancements to its graphics.

Sales of Extraction on the Wii were very poor; during its first week on sale in North America, the game sold just over 9000 units. This was attributed by industry analysts to a lack of marketing from Electronic Arts. While the team were surprised by the low sales, the positive critical reception validated their belief in the game. Papoutsis also commented that sales "picked up steam" after release rather than having an initial high spike. Speaking in 2012, Johnston attributed Extraction's commercial failure to its mature content on a console commonly associated with young audiences.
