= 40 Winks (video game) =

1999 video game

- European PlayStation cover art
- Developer: Eurocom Entertainment Software
- Publishers: GT Interactive; Piko Interactive (Nintendo 64, Windows)
- Producer: Mat Sneap
- Designers: Richard Halliwell; Rob Craven
- Writer: Martin Pond
- Composer: Steve Duckworth
- Platforms: PlayStation; Nintendo 64; Windows
- Release: PlayStation: EU: November 1999; NA: November 26, 1999; UK: 26 November 1999; Nintendo 64: WW: 15 April 2019
- Genre: Platform
- Mode: Single-player

40 Winks is a 1999 platform game developed by Eurocom Entertainment Software and published by GT Interactive for the PlayStation. A version was developed for the Nintendo 64, and reviewed in both Nintendo Official Magazine UK and Nintendo Power (whose January 2000 issue featured a strategy guide for the game), but was cancelled before release.

On 12 February 2018, Piko Interactive launched a Kickstarter campaign confirming that the unreleased Nintendo 64 version would be released, and also a Microsoft Windows version through Steam. It was funded on the same day. The PlayStation version was released on Steam on 22 October 2018. A cancelled Game Boy Color port was discovered in 2021.

== Gameplay and plot ==
40 Winks is a platform game where players act as siblings Ruff and Tumble. As the two are about to go to bed, their mother tells a story about the Winks and the HoodWinks. The Winks protect humans from nightmares and provide them good dreams. Meanwhile, an old man named NiteKap, who resides in Dreamland, is suffering from insomnia and instructs his teddy bear minion Threadbear to kidnap all of the Winks so no one else will sleep well either. The captured Winks turn into nightmare-bringing HoodWinks, and only 40 Winks are left, so its up to the playable protagonists to save them and stop NiteKap's plan.

After a tutorial with a sentient clock named Wakey Wakey, Ruff and Tumble enter Dreamland to traverse six worlds: Nightmare which is a halloween-themed world, Underwater which is a Jules Verne and Atlantis-style world, Space which has aliens and spaceships, Prehistoric which has dinosaurs and ancient temples, Castle which is a medieval-themed world, and Pirate that is themed to the golden age of pirates. In each of the six worlds are three levels, a flying race, and a final boss. To progress, the player must get through doors, each unlocked by having a number of golden tokens, known as "cogs"; there are also Dreamkeys necessary to open the door for each world's boss and progress the game. There are also Z icons that keep Ruff and Tumble asleep, which serves as health, and R&T tokens that are extra lives.

Throughout the adventure, Ruff is armed with a candle that burns enemies, Tumble a teddy bear. They can walk, run, jump, kick, butt-slam, swim, slide, and execute a combo move of punch, punch, kick, and their default projectile attack is a scream that turns into a lit-up ball, its energy fueled by obtaining Moons. They power themselves up using costumes from boxes scattered throughout, known as Jack in the Boxes. The Monster box turns them into Neanderthals with a brown vomit attack. Robot increases the power of their standard attacks and equips them with missiles and jetpacks that enable them to double jump. Ninja gives them the ability to pull themselves through ropes, and increases their agility and jumping height, and Superhero, which turns Ruff into a Clown and Tumble a Fairy, makes them invulnerable to enemies and drowning, and have greater jumping height. The HoodWinks to fight include a Frankenstein's monster, witch, zombies, boxer ape, bats, sharks, mice, robots, eating plants, puffer fish, tarantulas, parrots, pirates, and small dinosaurs.

The Nintendo 64 version has a two-player co-op mode where the players, although not able to directly harm, can propel each other's movements through kicks and punches. The game's default screen resolution is Normal, which is fuzzy, low resolution and runs at a quick speed, but the Expansion Pak allows for two additional screen resolutions: Medium, which is less fuzzy and has more graphical detail, and Hicol, which is the cleanest-looking mode, adds lighting effects, but also is a bit choppier in terms of frame rate.

== Development ==
40 Winks was the first original video game of developer Eurocom Entertainment Software, as their previous works included licensed products and ports of arcade titles. The project spent six months in pre-production before 16 months of production began.

As a game for all ages, Eurocom's focus was on developing new graphical techniques, the various skillsets and personalities of the playable characters, and presenting the humor and interactiveness of what the developers thought a child's viewpoint of a world with frightening creatures would be. Due to the target demographic, titles similarly meant for young players, such as Croc: Legend of the Gobbos (1997), Spyro the Dragon (1998), and Banjo-Kazooie (1998) were referenced, as well as focus groups of inexperienced young gamers. Changes made with their opinions include tweaks towards the controls and the help system. The Jack-in-the-Box was added to incorporate diverse gameplay styles, and the use of areas only accessible to Ruff and Tumble were meant to add replay value to the game. ZeeMan The Superhero was going to be one of the Jack-in-the-Box costumes, but his "massive build" looked too "adult" for the kid-friendly visual aesthetic. Thus, he was replaced by a robot that launch missiles.

GT Interactive bought the worldwide publishing rights in August 1998, after several other publishers vigorously competed for them, and the release date was set in late 1999. Explained Sneap, Eurocom chose GT Interactive for the publisher's marketing resources and "a strong team of producers".

== Reception ==
Reception

Aggregate score
Aggregator	Score
GameRankings	66%

Review scores
Publication	Score
AllGame	3/5
Game Informer	7/10
GameFan	318/400
GameSpot	4.1/10
IGN	5.5/10
N64 Magazine	71%
Nintendo Power	8/10
Official Nintendo Magazine	88%
PlayStation Official Magazine – Australia	8/10
Official U.S. PlayStation Magazine	4/5
N64 Gamer	80%

Critics were impressed with the visuals, particularly the attention to detail and look of the level settings. AllGame writer Glenn Wigmore was directed at the character animation for being "fluid" and cartoony, and he also enjoyed the voice acting and animation of the opening sequence. Martin Kitts of N64 Magazine noted its "technical prowess" and found the game just as visually impressive as Banjo-Kazooie, as well as similar with settings, particularly Banjo-Kazooie's Crusty Rusty Wreck. Mike Wilcox highlighted the high-resolution graphics and cutscenes, the "fluid motion and near glitch-free" graphics processing, and interactive music. Official Nintendo Magazine was enthusiastic, claiming it was another excellent Nintendo 64 platformer with "cartoon worlds and freaky enemies", sound effects "so cool they'll make you chortle", and "excellent music" that had a "real edge". N64 Gamer journalist Arthur called the stages "graphically crisp, with bright, cheery colours and some night lighting effects", particularly embraced by the "faint, light trail" of Ruff's candle.

AllGame writer Glenn Wigmore compared 40 Winks to Banjo-Kazooie for its platform genre, "moody soundtrack", and visual style, specifically its "shadowed color palette" and macabre level settings. He wrote that unlike other platformers at the time that tried to copy the formula of the Rare platformer, "40 Winks really shines and has an appeal that made Banjo-Kazooie the hit that it was." He praised the levels as "varied and will have you busy while you're in them", finding their visuals and lighting of the stages to be better than Banjo-Kazooie; he notes, however, that the space to explore was lesser, as a lot of areas include small rooms and caves. He appreciated the little amount of slowdown and loading times. However, he was disappointed by the fact that all the skills for traversing and attacking enemies were learned from the start, making it pale in comparison to Banjo-Kazooie where new skills always had to be learned throughout. Although he appreciated the thinking required in solving the puzzles, he wrote there should have been hints on where Winks could be, similar to Super Mario 64 (1996). He also considered the mini-games less "clever" than those in Donkey Kong 64 (1999).

Comparisons to other 3D platform games continued with a review by Martin Kitts of N64 Magazine. He generally found it all right and one of the better 3D platform games, exclaiming 40 Winks was "a thousand times more polished than Chameleon Twist 2, a million times better than Tonic 'The Chronic' Trouble. He, however, did not think it was "up to the fluffy standard set by Banjo-Kazooie and champion of Mario-borrowing sequences". He reported certain exciting moments such as Diddy Kong Racing-esque races, and having to get to areas before a Jack in the Box power-up runs out. However, he called the gameplay too basic in comparison to the genre's best, like Banjo-Kazooie, and stated it could be finished within a week with little incentive to play again. He went after the protagonist characters, calling them just as lovable as "other dull platform heroes who have tried and failed to impose their anodyne personalities on the world's younger gamers", such as Crash Bandicoot, Spyro the Dragon, Tonic, and Rayman. He also found the cuteness of their designs forced. According to him, the levels were very linear, and there was too much backtracking, such as moments where the player has to trek back to the start of a level after rescuing one Wink. He condemned the characters as overly prone to slipping off objects, such as narrow platforms, stairs, and even the top of small spiders. He was frustrated by the "hideous combat system", such as being still for a couple of seconds following a combo move and thus being vulnerable to enemy assaults. He also went after how small the screens were in the two-player mode, explaining that on a portable television, it made up only 1/6th of the screen and looking at it would cause headaches.

Erik, the PC Gamer of Game Informer was critical of the camera, complaining that it can "whip around" the player character in the middle of a simple jump. He compared its premise of a kid saving the world by defeating a villain in dreams to Swagman (1997).

Mike Wilcox wrote that its "huge levels and "practice makes perfect" gameplay would appeal to adults, and while the game genre is not unique, it has "plenty of twist and puzzles". He praised the emphasis on exploration, particularly the required collectable items were being "so hidden" they required a "keen eye" to be seen. His criticisms included the irritating camera and the fact that progress could only be saved after the completion of a world. He wrote it was another 3D platformer with a cute aesthetic, fitting in alongside Croc: Legend of the Gobbos (1997), Ape Escape (1999), and titles in the Crash Bandicoot and Spyro the Dragon series.

Ian Johnston of GameSpot, although stating 40 Winks was "sound in many respects", was ultimately a poor platformer due to its "utter lack of challenge, its ultracute tone (which severely limits its appeal), and its oversimplified gameplay."

Official Nintendo Magazine brought up the easy difficulty, which meant older gamers could finish it quicker than young players.

Marc Nix of IGN noted its demographic towards young children; it is similar to games in the Super Mario, Crash Bandicoot and Sonic the Hedgehog franchises, in that it uses cute characters and comical settings to appeal to all ages. He opined it contained "some well-done fantasy elements", with "all the imagination in the graphics, story, setting, and overall artistry", and "could have been a thrilling and mesmerizing voyage into the land of make-believe". The visuals are "sharp and well-drawn", and "the fantasy style is very nicely done, with a sweeping color palatte and constant lighting effects". Effects such as rain, thunder, the heavy use of iridescence, and the motion blur on the candle movement, were spotlighted. Additionally, "Most of the effects are staged trickery (for instance, lights aren't 100% true, and Ruff's candle doesn't light up the exterior), but the visual integrity is still very nice." He called the Dreamkeys and the save-date couches were "ingenious additions".

However, the unoriginal gameplay robbed it of that potential. The primary problem, according to him, was the off-balance difficulty, where pre-teen players could finish it within a day, but adolescent players would have too much trouble due to a lacking of a learning curve for them: "Bottomless pits, acid and lava lakes, and rampaging monsters face you at every turn, and children will likely run through all of their extra lives quickly, even on the easiest setting. Mini-games races pop up quite a bit, but they add little to the game and are more challenging than they need to be." He criticized the enemies having multiple hit points, which resulted in tedious combat. He described the areas as empty despite being so big, which made backtracking unfun as there was nothing to do. He described the controls as "blocky, partly because the two lead characters are a couple of corn-fed plumpers – even baby fat isn't that chubby." He also condemned the camera system, reporting swings around the character during difficult jumps, and occansionally being in undesirable potions, such as behind the character instead of front-of." He also reported the visuals occasionally making it hard to move around the level, such as dark caves and the lack of differentiation between aspects in the underwater segments.

The PlayStation version received "average" reviews according to the review aggregation website GameRankings.
