= Wasteland (comics) =

Comic book series published by Oni Press

Publication information
- Publisher: Oni Press
- Schedule: Monthly
- Format: Ongoing series
- Genre: Post-apocalyptic
- Publication date: July 2006–April 2015
- No. of issues: 60

Creative team
- Created by: Antony Johnston; Christopher Mitten
- Written by: Antony Johnston
- Artist(s): Christopher Mitten; Ben Templesmith

Wasteland is a monthly comic book series written by Antony Johnston, drawn by Christopher Mitten with covers by Ben Templesmith, and published by Oni Press. It debuted in July 2006 and ended in April 2015.

The series is set one hundred years after the Big Wet, an unspecified disaster that destroyed modern society and, it is assumed, changed the world's coastlines. The story takes place somewhere in America, now a barren desert and dustbowl without modern technology. The seas are poisonous, and subsistence farming with small amounts of livestock appears to be the norm.

The book also has theme music, composed and performed by Johnston, which can be downloaded from the official website.

== Format ==
Each issue of Wasteland is 32 pages long (with the exception of issue #1, which was a special double length premiere) and contains 22 pages of comic story, one episode of the prose serial travelogue Walking The Dust, a letters column and preview page for the following issue. The remainder of the pages are taken up by ads, normally for other series from Oni Press and/or by Wasteland's creators.

The letters column sometimes contains pieces of submitted fan art, and Johnston himself often answers the letters.

== The Big Wet ==
The most-seen explanation for the apocalypse comes from the Sunner religion, a sect that worships Mother Sun and Father Moon. According to their legend, the Big Wet was a retribution on the people of A-Ree-Yass-I for shunning the 'gifts' Mother Sun and Father Moon offered them. It seems as though this mythic place's name is a play on words by the author, and a linguistic contraction in-world, for "Area 1/I" (or perhaps "Area SI" = Area 51)—a military base/lab where the bomb was created.

== Storylines ==
Thus far, the comic has established two distinct storylines. The first follows a scavenger named Michael who roams the wasteland, trading what he can salvage. His life changes forever when he finds a machine that talks in a forgotten language, supposedly giving directions to the fabled land of A-Ree-Yass-I, where mankind's downfall began. Michael tries to trade the machine at a small town of Sunners called Providence, and his fate becomes intertwined with the town's sheriff, Abi.

The second storyline follows the political machinations of a large city known as Newbegin, where the city's leader Marcus (aka Lord Founder) is oppressing the Sunner population, most of whom are slaves.

== Sunner beliefs ==
Sunners have been shown to hold the following beliefs:

- They worship 'Mother Sun' and 'Father Moon'
- They cremate their dead in the open air
- They are pacifists (though they appear to make exceptions for non-human creatures)
- Fires are considered a form of tribute to their gods

== Collections ==
Oni are releasing trade paperback collections on an ongoing basis.

#	Title	ISBN	Release date	Collected material
1	Cities in Dust	ISBN 978-1-932664-59-1	March, 2007	Wasteland #1–6
2	Shades of God	ISBN 978-1-932664-90-4	December, 2007	Wasteland #8–13
3	Black Steel in the Hour of Chaos	ISBN 978-1-934964-08-8	December 2008	Wasteland #15–19
4	Dog Tribe	ISBN 978-1-934964-17-0	June 2009	Wasteland #21–24
5	Tales of the Uninvited	ISBN 978-1-934964-29-3	November 18, 2009	Wasteland #7, 14, 20, 25
6	The Enemy Within	ISBN 978-1-934964-30-9	November 16, 2011	Wasteland #26–31
7	Under the God	ISBN 978-1-934964-94-1	September 19, 2012	Wasteland #33–38
8	Lost in the Ozone	ISBN 978-1-620100-13-4	July 16, 2013	Wasteland #40–44
9	A Thousand Lies	ISBN 978-1-620101-18-6	March 19, 2014	Wasteland #46–51
10	Last Exit for the Lost	ISBN 978-1-620101-31-5	June 18, 2014	Wasteland #32, 39, 45, 52
11	Floodland	ISBN 978-1620101483	August 11, 2015	Wasteland #53–60

- Issue #7 'Children of the Sun' and Issue #14 'Death Walks Behind You', #20, #25, #32, #39, #45 and #52 were stand alone stories.

The series was afflicted by serious delays after issue #26. Issue #27, originally planned for July 2009 was delayed to January 2010, mainly due to Johnston's involvement with Dead Space, Dead Space: Extraction and other projects.

As of July 2009, Oni are also releasing hardcover collections.

#	Title	ISBN	Release date	Collected material
1	The Apocalyptic Edition: Volume 1	ISBN 978-1-934964-19-4	July, 2009	Wasteland #1–13
2	The Apocalyptic Edition: Volume 2	ISBN 978-1-934964-46-0	October, 2010	Wasteland #14–25
3	The Apocalyptic Edition: Volume 3	ISBN 978-1-620100-93-6	September, 2013	Wasteland #26–39
4	The Apocalyptic Edition: Volume 4	ISBN 978-1-620101-70-4	October, 2014	Wasteland #40–52
5	The Apocalyptic Edition: Volume 5	ISBN 978-1620102763	October, 2015	Wasteland #53–60

== Awards ==
- 2006: Nominated for "Best New Series" Harvey Awards
- 2007: Nominated for "Favourite Black and White Comicbook – American" Eagle Award
