= Eurocom =

British video game developer (1988–2012)

Eurocom Ltd.
- Final logo, used from 2006 to 2012
- Formerly: Eurocom Entertainment Software (1988–2006)
- Type: Private
- Industry: Video games
- Founded: October 1988; 38 years ago
- Founder: Mat Sneap; Chris Shrigley; Hugh Binns; Tim Rogers; Neil Baldwin
- Defunct: 6 December 2012; 13 years ago
- Fate: Closed
- Headquarters: Derby, England
- Number of employees: approx. 250

Eurocom Ltd., formerly known as Eurocom Entertainment Software until 2006, was a British video game developer founded in October 1988 by Mat Sneap, Chris Shrigley, Hugh Binns, Tim Rogers, and Neil Baldwin, to develop games for the Nintendo Entertainment System. Eurocom expanded to handheld game systems and major video game consoles. The company licensed arcade video games to port to consoles, and developed a few original properties, such as Magician (1991), Machine Hunter (1997), 40 Winks (1999), and Sphinx and the Cursed Mummy (2003).

== History ==
Former logo as Eurocom Entertainment Software, used from 1996 to 2005

Eurocom was founded in October 1988 by Mat Sneap, Chris Shrigley, Hugh Binns, Tim Rogers, and Neil Baldwin.

Eurocom was assigned to develop a party game for the Crash Bandicoot series by Universal Interactive. Crash Bash was released on November 7, 2000. It was the last Crash Bandicoot game to be released on the PlayStation.

The studio released Harry Potter for Kinect in 2012.

On 23 November 2012, Eurocom laid off around 75% of its 200 employees. The remaining 50 employees would focus on titles for mobile platforms according to studio director Hugh Binns. Despite the studio's previous statement, on 6 December 2012 the company laid off its remaining staff and closed. Eurocom stated its closure was due to a "steep decline" in sales of console and PC games.

The final game released by Eurocom was 007 Legends, published by Activision.

== Games developed ==
=== 1990s ===
Year	Title	Platform(s)	Publisher	Notes
1990	Magician	NES	Taxan	First game
1991	James Bond Jr.	NES	THQ	
1992	Lethal Weapon	NES, Game Boy	Ocean Software	
1992	Dropzone	NES, Game Boy	Mindscape	Co-developed with Arena Graphics
1992	Rod Land	Game Boy	Jaleco	Published by The Sales Curve in Europe
1993	Tesserae	MS-DOS, Game Boy, Game Gear	GameTek	
1993	Sensible Soccer: European Champions	Game Gear, Master System	Sony Imagesoft	
1994	Stone Protectors	SNES	Kemco	
1994	Dino Dini's Soccer	SNES	Virgin Interactive	
1994	Brutal: Paws of Fury	SNES	GameTek	Co-developed with GameTek
1994	The Jungle Book	NES, Genesis, Game Boy	Virgin Interactive	
1994	Tarzan: Lord of the Jungle	Game Boy, Game Gear	GameTek	
1994	Family Feud	MS-DOS, 3DO, Genesis	GameTek	
1994	Super Dropzone	SNES	Psygnosis	
1995	Earthworm Jim	Game Boy, Game Gear, Master System	Playmates Interactive	Co-developed with Shiny Entertainment
1995	Super Street Fighter II Turbo	MS-DOS, Amiga CD32	GameTek/Capcom	Co-developed with Capcom
1995	Spot Goes to Hollywood	Genesis	Virgin Interactive	Published by Acclaim Entertainment in North America
1996	Ultimate Mortal Kombat 3	Saturn	Midway Games/Williams Entertainment	
1996	Maui Mallard in Cold Shadow	SNES	Nintendo/Capcom	
1997	Cruis'n World	N64	Nintendo	
1997	Hercules	Windows, PS1	Disney Interactive/Virgin Interactive	Published by Sony Computer Entertainment in Europe
1997	War Gods	N64, PS1	Midway Games	
1997	Duke Nukem 64	N64	GT Interactive	Co-developed with 3D Realms
1997	Machine Hunter	Windows, PS1	MGM Interactive	
1998	Mortal Kombat 4	Windows, N64, PS1	Midway Games	
1999	Tarzan	Windows, N64, PS1	Disney Interactive	
1999	Duke Nukem: Zero Hour	N64	GT Interactive	
1999	NBA Showtime: NBA on NBC	N64, PS1	Midway Games	
1999	Hydro Thunder	Windows, N64, Dreamcast	Midway Games	
1999	Mortal Kombat Gold	Dreamcast	Midway Games	Updated version of Mortal Kombat 4
1999	40 Winks	PS1	GT Interactive	

=== 2000s ===
Year	Title	Platform(s)	Publisher	Notes
2000	Who Wants to Be a Millionaire? 2nd Edition	GBC	THQ	
2000	007: The World Is Not Enough	N64	Electronic Arts	
2000	Crash Bash	PS1	Sony Interactive Entertainment	Co-developed with Cerny Games
2001	NBA Hoopz	PS1, PS2, Dreamcast	Midway Games	
2001	Disney's Atlantis: The Lost Empire	PS1, GBC	Sony Interactive Entertainment/THQ	
2002	Crash Bandicoot: The Wrath of Cortex	GameCube	Universal Interactive	GameCube port; Co-developed with Traveller's Tales
2002	Rugrats: I Gotta Go Party	GBA	THQ	
2002	James Bond 007: Nightfire	Xbox, PS2, GameCube	Electronic Arts	
2002	Harry Potter and the Chamber of Secrets	Xbox, GameCube, GBA	Electronic Arts	
2003	Buffy the Vampire Slayer: Chaos Bleeds	Xbox, GameCube, PS2	Vivendi Universal Games	
2003	Sphinx and the Cursed Mummy	Xbox, GameCube, PS2	THQ	
2004	Athens 2004	PS2	Sony Interactive Entertainment	
2004	Spyro: A Hero's Tail	Xbox, GameCube, PS2	Vivendi Universal Games	
2005	Robots	PC, Xbox, GameCube, PS2	Vivendi Universal Games	
2005	Predator: Concrete Jungle	Xbox, PS2	Vivendi Universal Games	
2005	Batman Begins	Xbox, GameCube, PS2	Electronic Arts	
2006	Ice Age 2: The Meltdown	PC, PS2, Xbox, GameCube, Wii	Vivendi Universal Games	
2007	Pirates of the Caribbean: At World's End	PC, PS2, PS3, Xbox 360, PSP, Wii	Disney Interactive Studios	
2008	Beijing 2008	PC, PS3, Xbox 360	SEGA	
2008	The Mummy: Tomb of the Dragon Emperor	PS2, Wii	Universal Vivendi Games	
2008	007: Quantum of Solace	PS2	Activision	
2009	Ice Age: Dawn of the Dinosaurs	PC, PS2, Wii, Xbox 360, PS3	Activision	Co-developed with SuperVillain Studios and BudCat Creations.
2009	G-Force	PC, PS2, Wii, Xbox 360, PS3	Disney Interactive Studios	
2009	Dead Space: Extraction	Wii	Electronic Arts	Co-developed with EA Redwood Shores

=== 2010s ===
Year	Title	Platform(s)	Publisher	Notes
2010	Vancouver 2010	PC, PS3, Xbox 360	SEGA	
2010	GoldenEye 007	Wii	Activision	
2011	Rio	PS3, Xbox 360, Wii	THQ	
2011	Disney Universe	PC, PS3, Xbox 360, Wii	Disney Interactive Studios	
2011	GoldenEye 007 Reloaded	PS3, Xbox 360	Activision	
2012	Harry Potter for Kinect	Xbox 360	Warner Bros. Interactive Entertainment	
2012	007 Legends	PC, Xbox 360, PS3, Wii U	Activision	Final game

=== Unreleased ===
Title	Platform
Erik the Viking	NES
Stone Protectors	Genesis
Maui Mallard and the Lost City of Dread	PlayStation
Spider-Man 4	Wii
Sphinx 2	PS2, XBox, GameCube
Family Guy	Xbox 360
Dead North	Xbox 360
