= Dead Space: Liberation =

2013 graphic novel

- Date: February 5, 2013
- Publisher: Titan Books

Creative team
- Writer: Ian Edginton
- Artist: Christopher Shy
- Creators: Visceral Games; Electronic Arts

Dead Space: Liberation is a 2013 science fiction horror graphic novel written by Ian Edginton and illustrated by Christopher Shy, published by Titan Books. It forms part of the Dead Space survival horror media franchise developed by Visceral Games and published by Electronic Arts. Liberation is a prequel to Dead Space 3 (2013) detailing the experiences of EarthGov soldier John Carver following an outbreak of deadly monsters called Necromorphs, joining with Ellie Langford and Robert Norton on a search for the Necromorphs' origins.

Liberation began production fairly late in the development of Dead Space 3. Edginton had experience working with other properties and liked the series, and had to create his story around the already-complete script for the upcoming game. Shy had previously worked with Electronic Arts on the 2010 graphic novel Dead Space: Salvage, and had relative freedom when creating his artwork. Upon its release, Liberation appeared in The New York Times top ten bestsellers during its first month. Reception has been generally positive, with praise going to Shy's artwork and Carver's characterization.

== Publication history ==
The Dead Space series, originating with a series of survival horror video games primarily developed by Visceral Games, had been expanded into a multimedia franchise covering spin-off titles, animated movies, and printed media including comics and novels by its publisher Electronic Arts. Liberation, together with the 2012 novel Dead Space: Catalyst, was created to promote the 2013 release of Dead Space 3. The graphic novel was written by Ian Edginton, who had written works for multiple licenses including the Alien franchise and Judge Dredd. The illustrator was Christopher Shy; originally contacted by Electronic Arts to work on a different project, he met with representatives of Visceral Games and became involved with Dead Space by illustrating the graphic novel Salvage, released in 2010. Through the entire writing and drawing process, Edginton and Shy collaborated closely, and both enjoyed working together.

The graphic novel was designed as a prequel to Dead Space 3, with Edington estimating that the novel project began fairly late in the game's production. Edginton was contacted by a representative of publisher Titan Books, inviting him on board due to his experience writing for established universes. Edginton accepted, as he was a fan of the series and eager to contribute to the wider Dead Space universe. The scenario details for Dead Space 3 were set, and several points of lore had to be worked into the story, so Edginton had these points as an outline and created the scenario around it. This also meant that some of the character progressions were outside the writer's or illustrator's control, such as the relationship status of Ellie Langford. Due to time constraints, rather than working out the plot and dialogue together, Edginton created the story and scene order, sent these to Shy, then added dialogue into the completed comic pages. This approach gave Shy freedom with his artwork. Shy had input of his own on the scenario, pushing for added dialogue scenes between Ellie and protagonist John Carver to flesh out their relationship as people with a similar traumatic past.

Shy approached the work as he did with other projects; he first read the script once, then on repeats created sketches for the comic panels. As with his other work on the Dead Space series, he designed scenes as if he were creating a movie, looking to the work of Ridley Scott and Lars von Trier for stylistic inspiration. He focused a lot of effort on the facial expressions, as he felt they elevated the storyline above a simple chase, and gave more emotion to the characters. He also used background color to communicate emotion, such as blues and greens for the planet surface, earthy tones for safe areas in ships, and a burning red backdrop when Carver grew angry. The overall color scheme was inspired by the story's primary location in outer space, using grey tones to contrast against elements such as the orange and red elements of explosions and violence. While he stuck with the overall design of the series universe, he was also allowed a large degree of creative freedom with his artwork. In retrospective, he wished he could have included more Necromorph sequences.

When creating Liberation, he evolved his style from that of Salvage, trying to incorporate cut concepts from the earlier project. Speaking about the visual design, Shy said he worked to emulate and merge with the visual design of Dead Space 3 due to Liberation being a direct prequel to the latter. When designing Carver, Shy was given artwork by Electronic Arts, but wanted to portray him as an ordinary and vulnerable character forced to take on the role of "hero" under extraordinary circumstances. Carver's design was meant to be "a kind of silent, sad character" which updated the typical action hero look, contrasting the more outlandish punk rock aesthetic he had used for the lead character of Salvage. The opening two pages, where Carver is talking with his wife and going through an internal crisis between his work and his family, went through fifty versions before Shy was satisfied.

The graphic novel was announced in October 2012 alongside a series art book, and originally set for release on February 12, 2013. An animated teaser trailer was created to promote it, releasing in May 2012 prior to the announcement of Dead Space 3. The graphic novel eventually released in North America and the United Kingdom on February 5 alongside the North American release of Dead Space 3. The release of Liberation was supported by reprints by Titan Books of Salvage and the graphic novel compilation of the 2008 comic series.

== Synopsis ==
Liberation is set prior to the events of Dead Space 3. In the Dead Space universe, by the 26th century humanity is under attack from the Markers, manmade copies of an alien artifact that reanimate corpses as violent monsters called Necromorphs. While EarthGov tries to contain the crisis and exploit the Markers for their energy, the Church of Unitology works to further the Markers' work, believing them divine. The protagonist is John Carver, a disillusioned EarthGov soldier stationed on the planet Uxor; his estranged wife Damara and their child are also stationed on Uxor, with Damara working at a Marker facility. During a patrol round the Marker facility while talking with Damara, Carver watches as an EMP attack disables the fields stopping the Marker's Necromorph signal from spreading. Carver returns in search of his family, but is captured and tortured by the Circle, a group of militant Unitologist extremists led by Jacob Danik who arranged the attack.

Carver breaks free, but finds the facility's residents including his family turned into Necromorphs. After killing his mutated family, he breaks down and almost kills himself before being contacted by Ellie Langford, a former acquaintance who was working with Damara on the Marker research, contained in a hidden device. Carver agrees to retrieve the device, intending to use the information to lure out the Circle, but ends up cornered with Ellie. They are rescued by Ellie's ally Captain Robert Norton, who flies them to Ptolemy Station on the Eudora. En route, Ellie explains the Markers' role in the Necromorph outbreaks, and that Damara discovered a master signal being relayed by the Markers. They discover on Ptolemy Station the coordinates of the planet Tau Volantis, where a Marker infection was stopped by unknown means. They are forced to destroy Ptolemy Station and flee when Danik's forces pursue them. They head to Keyhole Station, where a ShockRing transport can take them to Tau Volantis.

Ellie unsuccessfully tries to decipher the signal data; her suggestion to contact Isaac Clarke for help is refused by Norton, who fears his involvement will expose them, is wary of any survivor of a Marker incident, and remains jealous of Isaac's former relationship with Ellie. Norton is also antagonistic towards Carver, seeing him as similar to Isaac. The group arrive to find Keyhole Station overrun by Necromorphs, which kill many of Norton's team. The three are briefly separated when Danik's forces attack the Eudora. Norton and Carver reunite and settle their differences, while Ellie meets with members of Keyhole Station and acquires the means of travelling through the ShockRing to Tau Volantis. As Norton uses Keyhole Station's weapons to fend off the Circle, Ellie transports to Tau Volantis and destroys the ShockRing, the resultant shockwave disabling the Circle's fleet. Her final request to Carver and Norton is to fetch Isaac so he can decipher the Marker data and find her on Tau Volantis.

== Reception ==
During its first month on sale, the hardback release of Liberation reached third place in the top ten best-selling graphic novels compiled by The New York Times.

Forbes's Jen Bosier noted the book's sympathetic portrayal of Carver, praised Ellie's portrayal compared to the other characters, and stated that Shy's artwork "truly sells [Liberation] not only as a graphic novel, but also as a work of art". Alex Lucard of Diehard GameFan praised both the artwork and storyline as an improvement over Salvage despite not being a fan of Shy's art style, citing the storyline as better than Dead Space 3 and lauding Carver's character arc.

In an editorial piece on the printed media of the Dead Space series, James Floyd Kelly of Wired, praised Carver's characterization in the graphic novel, saying it made him interested in how his character would evolve in the game. In a review for MTV, Charles Webb was less positive than others, finding the art style too dark for his taste and faulting the plot as predictable, though praising Edginton's handling of Ellie's relationships.
