= USG Ishimura =

Fictional spacecraft from Dead Space

- Dead Space location
- Appearance of the Ishimura in the Dead Space remake
- First appearance: Dead Space (2008)
- Genre: Survival horror

The USG Ishimura is a fictional spacecraft from the Dead Space franchise of survival horror video games developed by Visceral Games. Known as a "planet-cracker" in-universe, the mining vessel serves as the setting of the 2008 Dead Space and its 2023 remake after its crew recovers an alien artifact on the planet Aegis VII, which transforms them into undead creatures called Necromorphs. The protagonist, Isaac Clarke, is sent to conduct emergency maintenance on the ship but soon finds himself fighting the Necromorphs with his engineering tools in an attempt to survive and escape. The ship is rediscovered in the time between Dead Space and Dead Space 2, having been left abandoned for three years and subsequently taken to a massive spaceport known as the "Sprawl" for insurance purposes, which indirectly triggers a new outbreak of Necromorphs; Isaac revisits parts of the vessel during the events of the sequel.

The Ishimura was praised for its believable design and horror atmosphere. In the remake, entire sections had been redesigned, giving a more logical, accessible flow to the main layout while preserving others to maintain a familiarity of the original game.

== Description ==
The Ishimura ("Stone Village") is owned by the Concordance Extraction Corporation (CEC), and was named after Hideki Ishimura, a fictional Japanese astrophysicist who discovered faster-than-light travel in the form of the "shockpoint drive". Originally constructed in the early 2440s as a response to the Resource Wars, bloody interstellar conflicts that erupted due to Earth and its colonies' heavy consumption of resources, the Ishimura's successful maiden voyage alone caused the Resource Wars to come to an end, resulting in the development of an entire fleet of such ships.

For its final voyage before being formally decommissioned, the Ishimura was tasked with mining the planet Aegis VII; unbeknownst to everyone except the ship's senior officers including the captain, the true purpose of the mission was to cover up an illegal mining operation that had uncovered a mysterious alien "Marker" buried under the planet's crust. This decision led to the crew of the Ishimura falling prey to the Marker's influence and being slowly mutated into Necromorphs.

== Development ==
In the original Dead Space, due to technological limitations, the Ishimura was not rendered in full 3D. While its exterior was shown, the actual game took place in more limited segments of the ship that did not necessarily make logical sense, and everything besides playable areas was described as a "grey box". In the remake, in order to make players feel more immersed in the game's universe, the Ishimura was fleshed out more thoroughly and 3D modeled in its entirety, the developers creating floor plans of the entire ship. This resulted in a change to the level design to realistically fit within the ship itself, with everything being fully interconnected and loading screens removed. Many new corridors, paths and secret rooms were added, with a tram functioning as a fast travel system between major locations.

The remake's lead level designer described the ship as "a little off" and "dangerous looking" in the visual design of its spaces, created without regard for health and safety regulations.

== Reception ==
Liam Richardson of Rock Paper Shotgun called the Ishimura a believable vessel due to its "lived-in" feel, with each room providing context for how the ship operated, and the engineer protagonist, Isaac, being a "functional part" of the larger machine. Calling it a "magnificent feat of environment design", he described its cramped crew quarters as "indicative of a society that cares little for its workers" and described its crew as an "afterthought" for the Ishimura's designers, remarking that it paralleled real life. Characterizing its interior as "suffocatingly bleak", with "endless corridors of grim metal", he stated that the fact that the ship was "a miserable place to live and work" before the catastrophe was what made it remembered as fondly as locations such as City 17, Rapture or Spencer Mansion.

Good Game contrasted the Ishimura to "classic" locations in horror such as creepy cabins, abandoned mansions and insane asylums. They called its sound design the aspect that made it the most classic, saying that music was kept to a minimum, allowing Isaac to hear the scary and evocative sounds. They described its vents and hatches as "perfect entry points" for the Necromorphs, calling the level itself a "scream" that will lead the player "further down the rabbit hole of insanity". Nic Reuben of NME called the ship a "believable space" with "often-comical freedom", saying that it was hard to resist for horror fans due to its "palpable sense of misery" and praising its "collage of found sound effects". Mark Serrels of Kotaku described the Ishimura as a "magic trick" that makes the player believe they are inside it despite traversing a collection of levels, claiming that "the illusion is maintained and has weight". He cited the fact that the game prioritized the Ishimura's integrity as a "real, cohesive space" through multiple means.

The updates to the Ishimura in the remake were generally considered an improvement by critics. In a preview, TJ Denzer of Shacknews described the reworked vessel as "beautifully ugly and terrifying", saying it was given a "huge level of polish", and calling it more alive than ever before. Characterizing the environment as "well-built", he praised the lack of loading screen interruptions. Cass Marshall of Polygon called the Ishimura a "terrifying, rusted labyrinth" in both versions of the game, but lamented that the remake missed the opportunity to expand upon the rest of the ship's crew like it did with Isaac's characterization, describing them as "cardboard cutouts". However, Ashley Bardhan of Kotaku criticized the "lightless" ship's "smallness" as "suffocating", calling the remake's shadows "the only extra dimension" to the Ishimura, and expressing disappointment that the gameplay was not changed more drastically.

Andrei Dobra of Softpedia News remarked on the Ishimura's reappearance in Dead Space 2, calling it the most impressive location in that game as well. Stating that some of the first game's most memorable locations were brought back, he said that Visceral made the level feel fresh rather than simply an excuse to shorten the length of development. He specifically cited the increased emphasis on psychological horror rather than filling the ship with Necromorphs.

The implications of the idea of "planet cracking" itself were discussed by Chris McMullen of The Escapist, who believed that the Ishimura and similar ships were "deeply disquieting" due to the destructive methods of their operation. Saying that it paralleled the real-life practice of fracking, he hypothesized that the CEC was not being forthcoming about any possible disasters that may have occurred.
