= Dead Space (2023 video game) =

Video game remake

- Developer: Motive Studio (Note: Original game developed by EA Redwood Shores)
- Publisher: Electronic Arts
- Directors: Roman Campos-Oriola; Eric Baptizat
- Producer: Philippe Ducharme
- Programmer: David Robillard
- Artist: Mike Yazijian
- Writer: Joanna Berry
- Composer: Trevor Gureckis
- Series: Dead Space
- Engine: Frostbite
- Platforms: PlayStation 5; Windows; Xbox Series X/S
- Release: January 27, 2023
- Genre: Survival horror
- Mode: Single-player

Dead Space is a 2023 survival horror game developed by Motive Studio and published by Electronic Arts. A remake of the 2008 game of the same name developed by EA Redwood Shores, it is the first release in the Dead Space series since 2013's Dead Space 3. Like the original game, it is set on the USG Ishimura, a mining spaceship overrun by deadly monsters known as Necromorphs following the discovery of an artifact called the Marker. The player controls engineer Isaac Clarke as he navigates the spaceship and fights the Necromorphs while struggling with growing psychosis.

Plans for a fourth Dead Space game fell through once series developer Visceral Games shut down in 2017, putting the series in a dormant state. EA announced a remake of Dead Space in July 2021, to be developed by EA's Motive Studio. Among lead staff include senior producer Philippe Ducharme, creative director Roman Campos-Oriola, and art director Mike Yazijian, all whom had worked on titles within the Dead Space series. The remake was built in the Frostbite Engine, rebuilding all the systems from scratch for it and introducing new features such as volumetric and dynamic lighting. The game also takes advantage of the newer consoles' solid-state drive systems to create a seamless experience between levels without any loading screens. During development, EA made an explicit decision not to include microtransactions in the game.

Dead Space was released for PlayStation 5, Windows, and Xbox Series X/S on January 27, 2023. The game received generally positive reviews from critics, but reportedly failed to meet EA's sales expectations.

== Gameplay ==
The remake enhances the zero-gravity gameplay of the original game, allowing Isaac to navigate designated segments of the USG Ishimura using thrusters built into his suit.

Dead Space features various changes from the original game. Unlike the original game where he was a silent protagonist, Isaac now has voice lines of his own. In addition, previous voice lines and conversations remade for the game were adjusted to include Isaac, allowing him to engage, argue, and bond with the other characters. The game also features more gore than the original, introducing a "peeling" system in which the player can tear and destroy the bodies of the Necromorphs. Various weapons are more suitable for severing limbs, while others are more suitable for completely destroying bodies. The remake also improves on the "zero gravity" element of the original, providing Isaac with thrusters to freely move across designated areas of the Ishimura.

While featuring all the same suits and weapons from the original game, weapons can now be acquired by simply progressing through the story and do not need to be purchased at the suit kiosk using blueprints. While suits and weapons can still be upgraded with Power Nodes, they can only be fully upgraded by finding different suit blueprints or weapon parts that can be found in different areas of the ship. Weapon parts add on different upgrades, such as increased magazine size or better area-of-effect

The USG Ishimura is featured as a singular environment that can be freely explored without impacting the main story. Divided into six sections (Engineering/Mining, Hydroponics, Flight Deck/Hangar, Medical, Crew Quarters, and Bridge), players can unlock different areas of the Ishimura by proceeding through the main story. While the ship’s tram system can still be used to move to different sections, they are no longer readily available and must be unlocked by proceeding through each section on foot. A new feature added is the ability to access locked doors and containers by rerouting the ship’s power through various junction boxes or by using a security clearance instead of having to sacrifice Power Nodes.

== Synopsis ==
=== Characters and setting ===
Set in the 26th century, the story follows starship engineer Isaac Clarke and the crew of the repair vessel USG Kellion, assigned to the USG Ishimura, a massive planetary mining ship operated by the Concordance Extraction Corporation (CEC) that has gone silent above the planet Aegis VII. The other members of the crew are Kendra Daniels, a private contractor specializing in computer systems, CEC security chief Lt. Zach Hammond, his right-hand man Cpl. Aiden Chen, and helmsman Cpl. Hailey Johnston.

While investigating a distress call, the crew of the Kellion are attacked by Necromorphs, creatures made from mutated human corpses, and separated. Isaac is forced to fend for himself as he tries to save his crewmates and learn the truth behind the loss of the Ishimura. Along the way, he encounters several survivors, including his girlfriend, Senior Medical Officer Dr. Nicole Brennan, horticulturalist and Hydroponics Director Dr. Elizabeth Cross, Cross's boyfriend and Acting Chief Engineer Jacob Temple, Chief Science Officer Terrence Kyne, and his colleague, Special Researcher Dr. Challus Mercer.

=== Plot ===
The Kellion crew arrives at the outskirts of Aegis VII, but they crash-land aboard the Ishimura due to a docking malfunction. An injured Johnston stays behind as Isaac, Kendra, Hammond, and Chen investigate the seemingly abandoned ship. Necromorphs made from the corpses of the Ishimura's crew attack the group, killing Chen and forcing them to separate. As they battle the undead crew, the trio split up to explore the ship and find out what caused the outbreak. The situation soon worsens when the Necromorphs damage the Kellion's singularity core, causing the ship to explode and kill Johnston, while Hammond is attacked by a mutated Chen while searching the ship's bridge. Unwilling to harm his friend, he seals Chen in an escape pod and jettisons him into space. Kendra accesses the Ishimura's central computer and discovers that the ship was harboring a "discovery" from Aegis VII.

While exploring and repairing the damaged Ishimura, Isaac briefly reunites with Nicole and meets Cross, who is trying to find Temple and kill a giant Necromorph called the "Leviathan" that threatens to poison the Ishimura's oxygen supply. Isaac also discovers the presence of the fanatical "Church of Unitology"—a cult that led to his devout Unitologist mother killing his father and herself—and a large Marker, a mysterious icon of Unitology, which apparently caused the outbreak by inducing psychosis in the planet's colonists and later the Ishimura's crew when it was brought aboard at Kyne's request. As Isaac, Kendra, and Hammond are tormented by Marker-induced hallucinations, Isaac encounters Mercer, who reveals his intention to bring the Marker to Earth and cause a phenomenon he calls "Convergence", which will effectively turn the planet's entire population into Necromorphs.

After Isaac launches an emergency beacon crafted by Temple in the mining bay, the signal is tracked by USM Valor, but they succumb to the Marker's influence, having picked up Chen's pod, causing the Valor to crash into the Ishimura. Isaac and Hammond board the former to recover its singularity core and fix an escape shuttle Hammond found. Onboard, the two learn that the Valor had already been contacted by someone aboard the Ishimura and had orders to destroy the ship at all costs. The pair find the core, but Chen attacks Hammond, who sacrifices himself to kill Chen. Isaac retrieves the core and narrowly escapes the Valor before its destruction. Returning to the Ishimura, he encounters a guilt-ridden Kyne, who convinces Isaac and Kendra that they should return the Marker to Aegis VII to stop the outbreak.

While helping Kyne recover the Marker, Isaac re-encounters Mercer, who kills Temple before being crushed to death by Necromorph growths. Isaac loads the Marker onto the shuttle, but Kendra murders Kyne and escapes on her own. She reveals her true identity as a covert agent sent to retrieve the Marker, which she explains is a failed attempt at reverse-engineering the alien technology. The Marker was buried on Aegis VII when it proved too dangerous to control, but the Ishimura—engaged in illegal mining—revealed its presence, resulting in the Valor being sent to scrub the discovery. Before she can flee, Isaac and Nicole recall the shuttle remotely and use it to fly to the surface of Aegis VII, though Kendra flees in an escape pod.

Isaac and Nicole successfully return the Marker to the planet, but Kendra arrives and steals it back. She reveals that Nicole was dead all along, having committed suicide to avoid becoming a Necromorph. The "Nicole" Isaac was working with is actually Cross, who hallucinated Isaac as Temple, and the Marker manipulated them both to return it to the "Hive Mind", an enormous Necromorph that telepathically commands the others. Cross refuses to help Kendra take the Marker off Aegis VII and is killed. Kendra then tries to escape aboard the shuttle, but gets torn apart by the Hive Mind, which Isaac eventually kills. He abandons the Marker and narrowly escapes Aegis VII as the Ishimura's power fails and its payload crashes onto the planet's surface. Alone, Isaac tries to rest before being attacked by a hostile hallucination of Nicole.

In an alternate ending achieved through the New Game Plus mode, Isaac discusses "building something new" with his hallucination of Nicole, having covered the shuttle's interior with the Marker's language.

== Development ==
=== Background ===
Prior to Dead Space 3's release, a report indicated Electronic Arts wanted to move the series away from the survival-horror genre once the Dead Space trilogy was complete. During production of Dead Space 3, the team created story and gameplay concepts for the next game, which would have focused on the protagonist scavenging to survive as humanity neared extinction; Wanat envisioned the protagonist as Ellie rather than Isaac. The gameplay would have expanded upon the open, brief, zero-gravity sections in Dead Space 3, redesigned the Necromorphs to work in zero-gravity environments, reworked the crafting system, and incorporated a variety of ships to explore. There was also a concept for the Necromorphs' origin and the measures humanity might have to take to avoid extinction. Ultimately, plans for a fourth Dead Space game were abandoned as the team disbanded to work on other projects. Wanat had material planned for up to an envisioned fifth game.

Following the release of Dead Space 3, rumors that Electronic Arts had canceled the series emerged; the company denied these rumors and stated Visceral Games was working on other properties at the time. Visceral Games had shifted to work on Battlefield Hardline, which allowed them to become accustomed to the Frostbite game engine, which Electronic Arts was mandating for all of its in-house games. Visceral Games was closed in 2017 amid production on a Star Wars video game project. The Dead Space series remained dormant for ten years.

=== Production ===
Games journalist Jeff Grubb of GamesBeat reported that a remake of Dead Space was in development at Motive on July 1, 2021. He speculated that the success of EA's single-player Star Wars Jedi: Fallen Order (2019) and Capcom's remakes of Resident Evil 2 and Resident Evil 3 were instrumental in the publisher's decision to green-light the Dead Space remake.

The game was developed using EA's proprietary Frostbite engine, which Motive Studios previously used to develop Star Wars: Squadrons and the single-player campaign of Star Wars Battlefront II. The game retains the same story and structure as the original but features redesigned assets, character models, and environments. The developers intended to take advantage of SSDs on the ninth generation of consoles to have the game be presented as an "uninterrupted sequence shot", absent of loading screens. A member of EA's internal Runtime Technology Group assisted with graphical performance by analyzing code-based snapshots to diagnose instances of slowdown. Content that was removed from the original game due to technical constraints may also be added. The game does not feature any microtransactions, in contrast to Dead Space 3, where the addition of microtransactions resulted in a negative reception. The art director for the game, Mike Yazijan, previously worked as art director at EA Montreal assisting Visceral Games in developing Dead Space 2.

The original Dead Space was noted for its audio design, and the team intended to stay true to the original atmosphere while improving and modifying where necessary. Gunner Wright reprises his role as Isaac Clarke, who is fully voiced, like his appearances in Dead Space 2 and Dead Space 3. The developers worked for a middle ground between Isaac's silent portrayal in the original game and his more talkative presentation in the sequels, limiting his dialogue to occasional certain conditions where it is considered necessary for him to speak, such as making conversation with other characters. Tanya Clarke also reprises her role as Nicole Brennan from Dead Space 2. The other cast members include Anthony Alabi as Zach Hammond, Brigitte Kali Canales as Kendra Daniels, and Faran Tahir as Challus Mercer.

Dead Space went gold on December 15, 2022. The game's implementation of a rendering technique called variable rate shading (VRS) was criticized. The PC version received a patch on January 31, 2023 that added a VRS toggle, while the console versions removed the feature completely.

== Release ==
Dead Space was announced at EA's Play Live event on July 22, 2021, accompanied by a teaser trailer, with an initial target release date of late 2022. On March 11, 2022, it was announced that the game was being pushed to early 2023. On October 4, 2022, a gameplay trailer for Dead Space was released, which revealed the game's release date to be January 27, 2023.

== Music ==
While elements of Jason Graves' score for the 2008 original were retained, film and television composer Trevor Gureckis wrote a substantial body of new music over roughly 18 months, adding themes for major cutscenes and boss encounters, including Hunter, Leviathan, and the Hivemind. The new material was recorded across three orchestral sessions at Ocean Way Nashville with an orchestra of around 80 players and choir, supplemented by Gureckis' own solo violin and cello performances and by synthesizers.

== Reception ==
=== Critical reception ===
Reception

Aggregate score
Aggregator	Score
Metacritic	(PC) 87/100 (PS5) 89/100 (XSXS) 90/100

Review scores
Publication	Score
Destructoid	8.5/10
Digital Trends	4/5
Easy Allies	9/10
Electronic Gaming Monthly	5/5
Game Informer	9/10
GameRevolution	8/10
GameSpot	9/10
GamesRadar+	4.5/5
Hardcore Gamer	4.5/5
IGN	9/10
NME	4/5
PC Gamer (US)	84/100
PCGamesN	9/10
Push Square	8/10
Shacknews	9/10
The Telegraph	4/5
The Guardian	4/5
TouchArcade	4.5/5
Video Games Chronicle	4/5
VG247	5/5

Dead Space received "generally favorable" reviews from critics for the PC and PlayStation 5 versions, while the Xbox Series X/S version received "universal acclaim", according to the review aggregator website Metacritic.

IGN praised Motive Studio for rejuvenating the original game's setting "with its stunningly redesigned spaceship, smartly and subtly enhanced story, and spectacularly re-imagined action scenes". The Guardian described it as a streamlined version of Dead Space, making it flow more smoothly and "embrac[ing] the original's taut pacing and powerful forward-momentum." Eurogamer enjoyed the changes to the Ishimura, calling it "persistent and alive", but felt Isaac's new voice distracted from the horror. Kotaku disliked the unchanged boss fights describing them as "boring" and "methodical".

Polygon praised the new audio system added to the game, "The sounds of the Ishimura are richly layered - the din of machinery and otherworldly screams are a constant amplifier of fear." They also commented on the development of Isaac as a protagonist, praising the interactions that he has with the rest of the crew for improving the emotional stakes. GameSpot felt that the remake had made only marginal improvements on the 2008 version, but still praised it as "the quintessential way to play one of the survival horror genre's best." The Verge liked the updates to the story and Isaac's newly voiced dialogue, writing "Wright imbues the character with an endearing charm that makes him fun not only to protect but also to be around". PC Gamer praised the game for expanding on the original narrative with much more detail, which led them to hope that this effort could be channeled into a legitimate sequel.

Glen Schofield, the creator of 2008's Dead Space, voiced his approval for the remake and praised EA Motive's "faithful" recreation of the original.

=== Sales ===
In the United States, Dead Space was the second best-selling game of January 2023 behind Call of Duty: Modern Warfare II. It fell to third place in its second month following the release of Hogwarts Legacy. In the United Kingdom, the game topped the sales charts, becoming one of the best selling horror IPs in the country, although sales were lower than The Callisto Protocol. The PlayStation 5 version was reported to have taken up approximately 80% of boxed sales. Dead Space fell to third and sixth place in the following month.

=== Accolades ===
Year	Ceremony	Category	Result	Ref.
2023	The Game Awards 2023	Best Audio Design	Nominated	
2024	13th New York Game Awards	Freedom Tower Award for Best Remake	Nominated	
2024	27th Annual D.I.C.E. Awards	Action Game of the Year	Nominated	
2024	Game Audio Network Guild Awards	Best Game Foley	Nominated	
2024	Game Audio Network Guild Awards	Best Game Trailer Audio	Nominated	
2024	Game Audio Network Guild Awards	Sound Design of the Year	Nominated	

== Future ==
In April 2024, Jeff Grubb of Giant Bomb said that a remake of Dead Space 2 was in the concept phase of development at Motive Studio, but was later cancelled because of the "lackluster" sales of the Dead Space remake. However, EA denied this claim and a source told IGN that the remake was ultimately considered to have done well. Motive is currently developing an Iron Man game and supporting the Battlefield series. Jason Schreier of Bloomberg published an article which reported that after releasing the Dead Space remake, Motive spent a few months exploring ideas for a new series entry, which they wanted to be a sequel to the remake, rather than a remake of Dead Space 2, although both ideas were considered. However, following disappointing sales of the remake, the project was reportedly shelved.
