= Gunner Wright =

American actor

- Occupation: Actor
- Years active: 2007–present
- Notable work: Love, J. Edgar, Dead Space, G.I. Joe: The Rise of Cobra, Underwater
- Website: gunnerwright.com

Gunner Wright is an American film actor known for his role in the film Love and for portraying Isaac Clarke in the Dead Space video game series. Wright raced motorcycles competitively until the age of 21 when he moved to Southern California. There, he began working on Fox Television's Fastlane series and soon began a career in acting. He appeared in Clint Eastwood's film J. Edgar.

== Career ==
Wright appeared in G.I. Joe: The Rise of Cobra as a Secret Service Agent. In 2011, Wright starred in the 2011 film Love by director William Eubank. Wright played the main character, American astronaut Lee Miller who becomes stranded aboard the International Space Station.

Wright also stars in Dead Space 2 and Dead Space 3 as protagonist Isaac Clarke, developed by Visceral Games and distributed by Electronic Arts. Wright attended the 2010 Comic-Con to promote Dead Space 2 and meet with fans.

Variety described Wright's performance in Love, saying "Wright, shouldering nearly a one-man-show burden, is gamely athletic, all-American and somewhat of a blank slate, like Kubrick's astronauts – until some unfettered personality begins to seep out." Ain't It Cool News also described Wright's performance of Captain Lee Miller:

Gunner Wright carries a large load as the primary screen presence, and he does an excellent job of showing the deterioration of a logical man. Many films turn the loss of one's senses into a frantic, almost comically silly thing – whereas here, we watch [him] bounce between skirting the edge of sanity, and reeling himself in – he's self-aware enough at times to see where things are going. You'd get the sense that most astronauts would handle a situation like this in a similar way.

In August 2021, Wright confirmed that he would be reprising his role as Isaac Clarke in the Dead Space remake.

== Filmography ==
Roles
Year	Title	Role	Notes
2007	Wicked Wicked Games	Sexy Man	
2009	G.I. Joe: The Rise of Cobra	Secret Service Agent	Cameo
2010	The Losers	Jet Pilot	Cameo
2010	The Perfect Game	St. Louis Player #1	Cameo
2011	Love	Captain Lee Miller	
2011	J. Edgar	Dwight Eisenhower	Cameo
2011	Agent Mx-z3Ro	Agent Zero	Short
2012	A Good Soldier	Ollie Rodarte	Short
2014	The Gun	Marshall	Short
2014	Highway to Dhampus	Colt Morgan	
2015	I Am Alone	Mason James Riley	
2018	The Pinch	Rob	
2021	Paranormal Activity: Next of Kin	Deputy	
2023	Land of Bad	Captain David Andrews	

=== Video games ===
Year	Title	Voice role	Notes
2011	Dead Space 2	Isaac Clarke	PlayStation 3 / Xbox 360 / Microsoft Windows
2013	Dead Space 3	Isaac Clarke	PlayStation 3 / Xbox 360 / Microsoft Windows
2013	PlayStation All-Stars Battle Royale	Isaac Clarke (cameo appearance; DLC character)	PlayStation 3 / PlayStation Vita
2017	Star Wars: Battlefront II	Imperial Officer Matthis	Microsoft Windows / PlayStation 4 / Xbox One
2020	Maneater	Hunter 01 Male	Microsoft Windows / PlayStation 4 / Xbox One
2023	Dead Space	Isaac Clarke	Microsoft Windows / PlayStation 5 / Xbox Series X/S
2025	Death Stranding 2: On the Beach	Mike Northcoate (Voice)	PlayStation 5
