= Dead Space 3 =

2013 video game

- Developer: Visceral Games
- Publisher: Electronic Arts
- Director: Ben Wanat
- Producer: David Woldman
- Programmers: Steve Timson; Louis Gascoigne
- Artists: Alex Muscat; Ian Milham
- Writers: Jay Turner; Cherie Priest
- Composers: Jason Graves; James Hannigan
- Series: Dead Space
- Platforms: PlayStation 3; Windows; Xbox 360
- Release: NA: February 5, 2013; AU: February 7, 2013; EU: February 8, 2013
- Genres: Survival horror, action
- Modes: Single-player, multiplayer

Dead Space 3 is a 2013 survival horror action video game developed by Visceral Games and published by Electronic Arts for PlayStation 3, Windows, and Xbox 360. It is the third and final main entry in the Dead Space series. The game's story follows player-character Isaac Clarke and his allies as they explore a frozen planet, Tau Volantis, to discover the origins of the growing threat from their enemies, the Necromorphs. Players control Isaac and explore the environment, solve puzzles, and find resources, while fighting Necromorphs and hostile humans called Unitologists. The game supports online cooperative multiplayer sessions in which a second player takes the role of new character John Carver.

Production of the game began in 2011 after the release of Dead Space 2; the sequel was initially planned as a horror-focused experience but demands from Electronic Arts resulted in the introduction of action elements, the de-emphasis of horror themes, and the introduction of microtransactions. The gameplay was adjusted based on the new setting, and the story was written to close out the series and explain the remaining mysteries of the Necromorphs. Composers Jason Graves and James Hannigan wrote the game's score. A downloadable content (DLC) episode subtitled Awakened was released in March 2013; it was developed with more focus on horror elements.

Dead Space 3 was promoted with additional media, including a graphic novel called Dead Space: Liberation. Critical reception was generally positive. The game received praise for its atmosphere and gameplay, but critics and players questioned its shift towards action. Awakened gained a mixed reception; its plot holes and short length were criticized. Dead Space 3 peaked high in sales charts but sold fewer copies than the publisher had expected. Plans for a sequel were abandoned, the development team was disbanded, and Visceral Games closed in 2017. The series remained dormant until a remake of the first Dead Space game was released in 2023.

== Gameplay ==
Protagonist Isaac Clarke fighting a Necromorph on the planet Tau Volantis

Dead Space 3 is a science-fiction-themed survival horror action video game. Players control lead character Isaac Clarke from a third-person perspective through a level-based narrative campaign. Players navigate a variety of environments—mostly on the ice-covered planet Tau Volantis—completing narrative-based missions, solving physics-based puzzles in the environment, and fighting monsters called Necromorphs. In addition to standard movement, Isaac can climb some ladders to reach high platforms and rappel up and down some vertical slopes with accompanying controls for sideways movements and dodging environmental threats. During some sections, Isaac can explore outer space but has a limited supply of air. Some areas are subject to weightlessness, with Isaac using his RIG suit to explore debris and spacecraft.

While exploring, Isaac can break crates using his melee attack or a stomp action. The Kinesis ability can move or pull objects and the Stasis ability slows a target's movement for a limited time. As with previous Dead Space games, almost all gameplay displays show in-game as diegetic holographic projections; the exception is the interface for a crafting bench. Isaac's health and energy meters are shown on the back of his RIG suit, ammunition counts are shown on the weapons, and opening the inventory screen does not pause the game.

Isaac must fight several types of Necromorphs that emerge from the environment; he also encounters human enemies, and occasional three-way battles between Isaac, Necromorphs, and human soldiers occur. Isaac can use two weapons to combat the Necromorphs, which can only be killed by severing their limbs, a method called strategic dismemberment. In addition to standard movement-based combat, Isaac can move into cover behind some objects such as box piles. All weapons draw from a pool of universal ammunition. Some items such as health, weapons, and ammunition can be found in the environment, and additional items and customized weapons are created using crafting benches that are found during the campaign. Weapons are crafted using blueprints and can be customized with multiple firing types, melee counter enhancements, and buffs to enhance damage. Crafting resources are found in the environment; these are retrieved using a scavenger robot and are collected with ammunition from defeated enemies. Resources can also be purchased with real money in microtransactions using the bench interface.

Alongside the single-player mode, a second player can take on the role of secondary protagonist John Carver in online cooperative (co-op) multiplayer mode. The co-op game is opened from the main menu, from which the host player can invite a friend or create an open invitation for any player to drop into a session. While leaving the story mostly unchanged, co-op mode adjusts the game's puzzles, and unlocks co-op-exclusive side missions and cutscenes related to Carver. A central part of the co-op campaign is "asymmetrical dementia", in which players experience different hallucinations. The Xbox 360 version incorporates the Kinect peripheral, with which players can use voice commands to communicate and activate abilities such as stasis. Beating the game unlocks New Game Plus, allowing players to carry over weapons and armor, and additional gameplay modes. "Classic" mode removes crafting and plays similarly to earlier games. "Pure Survival" has enemies but no resources, enforcing health-and-ammunition management and focusing on crafting. "Hardcore" introduces permadeath, in which Isaac has only one life; his death forces the player to restart the game from the beginning of the campaign.

== Synopsis ==
=== Setting and characters ===
The central cast of Dead Space 3; from left to right, Isaac Clarke, Jennifer Santos, Austin Buckell, Ellie Langford, Robert Norton, and John Carver.

Dead Space 3 is set in the 26th century. In the backstory, resource-starved humanity experimented with an alien artifact called the Black Marker, which triggered dementia and mental illness, and changed corpses into monsters called Necromorphs. During the initial outbreak, a new religion called the Church of Unitology emerged, worshipping the Marker as a divine force that would lead humanity to a unified state, dubbed "Convergence". Later experiments with copies known as Red Markers yielded the same result, prompting the Earth Government (EarthGov) to conceal the Red Markers. The Marker incidents are revived when the mining ship USG Ishimura discovers one on the planet Aegis VII. In the present, the Markers are attacking humanity; while EarthGov tries to contain the crisis and exploit the Markers for their energy, the Church of Unitology works to spread the Markers' influence.

The main protagonist of Dead Space 3 is Isaac Clarke, an engineer who survived the Ishimura incident, resultant torture by EarthGov for the Marker blueprints in his mind, a subsequent outbreak on the Titan-based space-station Sprawl, and mental illness triggered by the Markers. The secondary protagonist is John Carver, an EarthGov soldier who survived a Necromorph outbreak that killed his family. Other characters include Ellie Langford, a pilot and Isaac's ex-girlfriend; Robert Norton, an EarthGov officer and Ellie's new boyfriend; Jacob Danik, terrorist leader of a militant Unitologist group called the Circle; and Marker researchers Jennifer Santos and Austin Buckell.

=== Plot ===
Two centuries ago, a military team on the frozen planet Tau Volantis retrieves an artifact known as the Codex. The team's commander kills his remaining subordinate, erases the data on the Codex, and then commits suicide.

In the present, Isaac is hiding in a colony on Earth's moon when Carver and Norton forcibly recruit him to help them find Ellie, escaping a Necromorph outbreak triggered by Danik and the Circle. Ellie's location is traced to Tau Volantis, which is assumed to be the Marker home world. Isaac, Carver, Norton, Santos, and Buckell travel to Tau Volantis's moon; they rescue Ellie and investigate the orbiting derelict ship Terra Nova, discovering evidence of past research on the Necromorphs and the recurring phrase "Turn it off". They crash-land on Tau Volantis, and Isaac and Carver separate from the rest of the crew. Isaac and Carver find Buckell shortly before he dies. After reuniting, the survivors set off in search of a key called "Rosetta"; they are pursued by Danik and the Circle, who followed them to Tau Volantis. Norton betrays the group to the Circle, hoping to safely return to Earth with Ellie; Danik betrays Norton, whom Isaac kills in self-defense. Santos later dies during another Necromorph attack.

"Rosetta" is revealed to be a cryogenically frozen alien who is native to Tau Volantis, whose population was another victim of the Necromorph infection. Isaac experiences a vision that reveals the Markers influence evolution and perpetuate the Necromorph life cycle. As a last resort before being overwhelmed, the aliens created a machine that sent the planet's moon − in reality a giant, intelligent Necromorph hivemind − into hibernation by freezing the entire planet; the message "Turn it off" came from the Markers so the moon can awaken and summon more of their species to consume all life in the universe. "Rosetta" was used by Tau Volantis' first research expedition to create the Codex, a DNA key that can control the machine. Danik captures Ellie and threatens to kill her, forcing Isaac and Carver to give him the Codex. Danik deactivates the machine, reviving the moon and triggering Convergence — the absorption of all organic matter on Tau Volantis to empower the moon - but dies in the resulting destruction. After sending Ellie away, Isaac and Carver reach the machine and reactivate it, which kills the moon and apparently them. With the Marker signal gone, a saddened Ellie returns to Earth.

In Awakened, the still-living Isaac and Carver try to escape Tau Volantis, facing more Necromorphs and suffering from severe hallucinations. Through one of these, Isaac learns that the other moons have been awoken and are searching for Earth. Isaac and Carver use a Circle shuttle to reach the Terra Nova to find a lightspeed drive and warn Earth, and they confront a cult of insane Circle survivors. The moons invade Isaac's mind and reveal to him that they have always known Earth's location and were stalling him and Carver. After killing the cultists, Isaac and Carver return to Earth but find it under attack by the moons. They crash into an approaching moon, leaving their fates unknown.

== Development ==
Following the release of Dead Space 2, the team of developers at studio Visceral Games found sales were similar to those of the first game but the production budget had increased. A 2012 report showed Dead Space 3 was almost canceled following the poor sales of Dead Space 2, which disappointed publisher Electronic Arts. The team felt the need to incorporate more mainstream elements into the series. The game's director was Ben Wanat, who had worked on the series as a designer of the Necromorphs and as a writer of the series' background lore. David Woldman was senior producer. After the increased action focus of Dead Space 2, Wanat wanted to return to survival-horror elements with the crafting system that was originally designed to emphasize Isaac's engineering background. To broaden the third game's appeal, the developers altered the game's genre by incorporating action elements, though there was an effort to keep the horror elements the series was known for. Antony Johnston, who had written for the original game and its related media, said the decision was indicative of the team's wishes and a "necessary evil" to increase sales.

The game's production was troubled; during a franchise review, the developers received multiple requests from Electronic Arts, whose priority was to increase sales by following then-current gaming trends, leading to clashes with the production team's wishes for the game, including the simplification of the final crafting system and the contentious introduction of microtransactions, which the team did not want. The shift was part of Electronic Arts' refocusing of marketing and resources on established franchises with strong sales figures, contrasting with their earlier experiments with new game ideas like Dead Space. Microtransactions were kept optional with unlimited resource mining using a remote device and yielding the same items that could be purchased; at release, players assumed this feature was a glitch. When production finished, some of the team remained to complete work on the DLC episode Awakened while the rest dispersed to work on other Electronic Arts franchise projects.

=== Game design ===
Executive producer Papoutsis stated the team wanted to make a game that was superior in quality to Dead Space 2. The game was first developed for PlayStation 3 and Xbox 360, then ported to Windows, resulting in limited graphical options for Windows. According to Papoutsis, the team wanted the game experience to be similar across all platforms. When asked whether a Wii U version was being considered, Papoutsis said the platform was wrong for the Dead Space series at that point. For the Xbox 360 version, the team implemented Kinect functionality into the co-op mode. The team had worked with other motion-control-based systems in the series but had never worked with Kinect. They used only voice-based commands because they felt gestures would disrupt the established gameplay feel. The game engine, which was carried over from earlier games in the series, had to be adjusted for larger environments. Real-time depth-of-field adjustment and more-realistic reflections and light behavior were new technical additions. The team tried preserve the diegetic UI design but had to break this rule and create a more-conventional, full-screen UI display for the crafting bench; an early version that showed Isaac working over the desk with displays around him was deemed unusable.

Electronic Arts had repeatedly raised the possibility of including a multiplayer mode to broaden the series' appeal; it was dropped from the first game for design and budget reasons while Dead Space 2 includes it as a separate competitive mode. Fans of the series had also requested the inclusion of a cooperative mode. For Dead Space 3, the team agreed to include cooperative multiplayer from the outset and "do it properly". The original proposal was to have a hallucinatory "Shadow Isaac" who would appear to be like another character, playing into early story concepts surrounding Isaac's mental state, but Electronic Arts prompted the team to make a more traditional co-op mode without the horror elements. Story producer Chuck Beaver said after the game's release, the switch from single-player to including co-op happened in the middle of the game's production. The tuning and balance of gameplay and enemies needed to be adjusted to account for the co-op element; some sections were made co-op exclusive with unique story elements. There were also adjustments to the enemy artificial intelligence (AI) and spawning rates are unique to the co-op mode.

The new setting Tau Volantis allowed the team to experiment with obscuring visibility with sudden blizzards, combining it with the sound design to create a different type of tension than previous entries. Woldman compared the design of levels to a roller coaster, with moments of high action and tension between periods of rest. The game's environments were made more open rather than the enclosed settings of earlier games to prompt players to use different tactics when dealing with enemies. The vertical environmental design also meant rappelling could be incorporated. The Flotilla, a zero-gravity section, was designed with "some pretty wild setups" that had to be reduced in intensity or cut from the final version. The Flotilla allowed the team to incorporate more traditional, closed environments like those in the first two Dead Space games. From December 2011, the team focused on tuning controls and the weapon-upgrade system, increasing the speed of Isaac's movements from Dead Space 2 to match the new human enemies. The in-game currency Credits was removed to focus players on the crafting system. The team also wanted to minimize backtracking, which had been used and criticized in the original game and reduced in Dead Space 2. Where it did happen, the environment and gameplay design were changed to provide something new.

=== Scenario and art design ===
When Wanat became director, he wanted to place more focus on story than had the earlier games. As the team suspected, it would be the final game in the series, and they decided to conclude the overall narrative. Wanat said he "shoehorned in" a lot of story to close the series. The cliffhanger ending of Awakened left the series open for a possible continuation. The team had written a backstory for the Dead Space universe, and beginning with Dead Space 2 had started making a cohesive narrative involving these elements. Feedback from players wanting explanations for the Markers prompted a focus on their origins and the creation of the Necromorphs. Speaking about the pacing, Wanat said he wanted to give players breathing space and to pace the horror elements. Beaver was involved with the series from the beginning. The story and script were a collaborative effort between Beaver, Wanat, and in-house writer Jay Turner. Another writer on the project during 2011 was novelist Cherie Priest, who appreciated the experience but was uninterested in working again with Electronic Arts.

The early narrative would have explored Isaac's mental state, focusing on the Shadow Isaac companion; hallucinations would play a part in gameplay and player interaction. The finale would be adjusted around Shadow Isaac, both in both single-player and co-op modes. Shadow Issac was scrapped because Electronic Arts wanted the team to avoid psychosis and dementia as central themes. The shift to incorporating co-op required story rewrites and presented problems during story presentation; Carver vanished from scenes in which he did not appear with Isaac. While the final narrative kept elements of psychological horror, the focus shifted to the characters surviving the environment of Tau Volantis. The narrative, which reveals the Necromorphs' involvement in human evolution, references the work of Erich von Däniken. The Necromorph Moon is a reference to the Great Old Ones created by H. P. Lovecraft, whose work had been an influence on the series since its inception.

As with the rest of the series, Isaac is portrayed as a reluctant participant in events. The character Carver emerged after Shadow Isaac was scrapped; the request was for a soldier-type character that was then common in mainstream gaming. Carver was constructed "as his own man" with personal issues that make him vulnerable to the Markers. His behavior and role were intended to contrast with Isaac's experience with the Markers. The co-op storylines allow players to get to know Carver as a character. During early design concepts, Wanat wanted Carver to be "a monster inside and out"; Wanat sketched Carver with ugly facial scarring that was retained in a reduced form. The hallucination elements relating to Carver's role in the co-op gameplay were retained in a limited form in the final game but time-and-budget constraints limited their incorporation. The militant Unitologist faction emerged from the team's desire to include a human-enemy faction for Isaac to fight alongside the Necromorphs.

The game's art director was Alex Muscat, who was senior environmental artist on Dead Space 2. Previous lead series artist Ian Milham left the team after pre-production was completed. Speaking about the art design, Muscat said there were several key elements retained for the game, including its science-fiction setting, feelings of fear and loneliness, and the presence of disturbing elements. Without changing much of the world design, Muscat added more color to environments and lowered the light contrast. There were also color changes to reinforce situations, giving more variety to environments. Patrick O’Keefe created the concept art and designed Tau Volantis to make players exploring it seem insignificant and small. Tau Volantis drew inspiration from John Carpenter's movie The Thing and other sources. The environmental design for the human-made ruins on Tau Volantis was intended to appear less high-technology with devices and character outfits that are inspire by pre-digital machinery and safety equipment. The team referenced vintage photographs of expeditions to Antarctica and contemporaneous scientific outposts in Alaska to give these environments a familiar feeling. The ice formations were given a serrated appearance to look as though they might cut the player, making the environment threatening and referencing recurring visual motifs within the series. The alien city was created as a homage to the spaceship in Alien, using circles as a recurring visual and design motif.

Isaac's design was kept consistent with earlier designs in the series; his suit design and choice of weaponry had become iconic. The character's suit was redesigned to fit in with the cold environment; a fur-collared version was chosen because the team liked it more than the other options. The humanoid Necromorphs were redesigned to appear more horrifying; and some had specific inspirations—the Feeders were recycled from one of the original game's early concepts using re-animated mummies, and the Infectors are homages of the monsters of Alien and The Thing. The team researched frozen mummies from lost polar expeditions to accurately design the enemies. The alien Necromorph designs for Tau Volantis, which was originally an ocean planet and used a non-human species, drew inspiration from illustrations of aquatic life by Ernst Haeckel. Their design was allowed to be less realistic and potentially more horror-themed; it is also a homage to early concept designs for the original Dead Space. The Moon incorporates features from squids and jellyfish.

=== Audio ===
The Dead Space series is known and noted for its audio design. Calhoun wanted to expand upon the use of sound to create tension and scare players. Sound elements were recorded in-house; the team used voice and audio samples to create disturbing sounds in the environment, for example, they shook dry teabags to create a dry, crunchy sound for one type of enemy. Many of the new Necromorph sounds were provided by the development team. Gunner Wright provided voice and motion capture for Isaac, describing the part in Dead Space 3 as fun to perform. Carver was voiced and motion-captured by Ricardo Antonio Chavira. Sonita Henry voiced Ellie while new characters Robert Norton and Jacob Danik were played by Robert Gant and Simon Templeman, respectively.

Jason Graves, composer for much of the Dead Space franchise, returned to work on Dead Space 3, creating the score with newcomer James Hannigan. Mirroring the shift towards action in the gameplay, the music shifted to be more action-oriented, though Graves wanted to keep themes and motifs from earlier games. Hannigan's pieces focused on narrative movement; consciously avoided Graves's established style. The zero-gravity environments, while generally realistic, use small musical cues to emphasize action elements. Graves and Hannigan mostly worked on different areas of the music, and focused on specific chapters, but both of their compositions feature in some sections of the game.

== Release ==
Rumors about the game's developed emerged during 2011 and 2012. A later leak revealed some of the gameplay concepts, including elements such as Shadow Isaac that were ultimately cut. The game was officially revealed at E3 2012 in June. A trailer focusing on the co-op and action elements was produced, leading fans to become worried about the direction the game was taking and prompting Wanat to reassure fans it would retain horror elements. A demo was launched on January 22, 2013, through PlayStation Network and Xbox Live, reaching two million downloads by February 3. Players with Dead Space 2 save data gained early access to a powerful version of the Plasma Cutter weapon. Players with save data from Mass Effect 3 could unlock a RIG suit that is themed on the N7 armor of Mass Effect protagonist Commander Shepard.

Dead Space 3 was released worldwide during February 2013; it released in North America on February 5, Australia on February 7, Europe on February 8, and in Japan February 14. The launch trailer featured Wright portraying Isaac in live-action. Customers who pre-ordered the PC version were also provided with a copy of Dead Space. The PC version was originally exclusive to Electronic Arts' Origin platform but on June 18, 2020, it was released on rival platform Steam. Alongside the standard version, a limited edition that gave players early access to two powerful RIG suits and associated weapons was released. Electronic Arts collaborated with Treehouse Brand Stores to create a special edition of the game that was called the Dev Team Edition and includes promotional and behind-the-scenes material created by staff members, an art book, themed postcards and posters, a water bottle designed after the game's health packs, and a Marker statue. Two versions were created for the standard and limited editions.

Two pieces of printed media—the novel Dead Space: Catalyst and the graphic novel Dead Space: Liberation—were created to promote Dead Space 3; forming part of the "trans-media franchise" approach Electronic Arts had adopted for the Dead Space series. Catalyst, which was written by B. K. Evenson and released on October 2, 2012, by Tor Books, is set during the period of EarthGov's experimentation on the Markers. Liberation, which was written by Ian Edginton and illustrated by Christopher Shy, was released on February 5, 2013, by Titan Books, and focuses on Carver's first contact with the Necromorphs and his involvement with Ellie's search for Tau Volantis.

=== Downloadable contents ===
At launch, multiple DLC items were sold separately from the microtransaction systems, and tied into the crafting and upgrade systems. The DLC covered upgrades to the scavenger robot, and new suits and armor. There was also an online pass to allow used copies to access online play. Papoutsis hinted on story-based DLC in January 2013. A story-based DLC expansion subtitled Awakened was released worldwide on March 12. Following the completion of Dead Space 3 some months before release, production began on the DLC. Awakened was produced by a small, separate team who worked on their own ideas with their own budget and resource allocation. The DLC's producer Shereif Fattouh said the concept for a fear-based experience had been in place for some time and was not influenced by any feedback about the main game.

== Reception ==
=== Critical response ===
Reception

Aggregate score
Aggregator	Score
Metacritic	(X360) 78/100 (PC) 78/100 (PS3) 76/100

Review scores
Publication	Score
1Up.com	B−
Computer and Video Games	7.3/10
Edge	7/10
Electronic Gaming Monthly	7.5/10
Eurogamer	7/10
Game Informer	9.75/10
GameSpot	8/10
GameTrailers	7.7/10
IGN	7.8/10
Joystiq	4.5/5
PlayStation Official Magazine – UK	7/10
Official Xbox Magazine (UK)	7/10
PC Gamer (US)	80/100
Polygon	9.5/10
VideoGamer.com	5/10

Dead Space 3 received "generally favorable" reviews from critics, according to review aggregator website Metacritic. During the 2013 National Academy of Video Game Trade Reviewers Awards, Dead Space 3 was nominated in the categories "Animation, Interactive"; "Direction in a Game Cinema"; "Sound Effects"; and "Use of Sound, Franchise". Upon its release, Dead Space 3 received generally positive reviews from critics, many of whom praised its gameplay, crafting system, and graphics. A common criticism was the move from survival-horror toward action, which many felt weakened the experience. Fan reaction was also mixed on the change to an action-heavy experience, both before and after release.

Tim Turi of Game Informer and Arthur Gies of Polygon were positive about the game, saying the incorporation of action benefited the series without diluting its horror and aesthetic, and praising the co-op mode as an unobtrusive addition. Shaun McInnis of GameSpot, while calling its story convoluted, praised its atmospheric presentation and gameplay additions. Nathan Ditum of PC Gamer praised the game's tone and co-op elements, though he noted pacing issues due to its size and the disjointed nature of its chapters; he also said the game is a natural evolution of the series and still carries key elements of the Dead Space series. Joystiq's Ludwig Kietzmann called Dead Space 3 "an exciting, shocking and mammoth adventure", praising its integration of action elements and co-op mode, and lauded its space sections as some of the best parts of the game. Computer and Video Games's Matthew Pellett praised the mechanics, highlighting some early co-op sections and enemy designs for their use of horror but said several elements, including changes to ammunition and a lack of variety, were detrimental, and that the game "[wasn't] Dead Space anymore".

Edge Magazine lauded Dead Space 3's immersion and outer-space section but said the campaign is too long and the storyline of saving humanity lets down the narrative. Electronic Gaming Monthly's Ray Carsillo praised the presentation and storyline but said the mechanics are generic and noted a lack of horror compared with earlier games in the series. Carsillo also said the microtransactions are an unwelcome addition to the game. IGN's Casey Lynch spoke negatively about the game's story and mission structure but said the gameplay in both single-player and co-op is enjoyable enough to allow players to overlook any problems. Dan Whitehead writing for Eurogamer summed up the game as having many contradictory parts ranging from polished and well-designed to clumsy or unoriginal, calling it a game for newcomers rather than series fans.

Ryan Stevens of GameTrailers enjoyed the co-op gameplay and noted the outer-space sections as a highlight but disliked the story and characters, and criticized the microtransactions. Joel Gregory of PlayStation Official Magazine UK, while enjoying the gameplay, noted a loss of elements that make earlier Dead Space games stand out, and that the recycling of elements caused a loss of scariness. Edwin Evans-Thirlwell writing for Official Xbox Magazine UK praised the crafting and co-op integration, but wrote negatively about the story and repetitive gameplay elements. VideoGamer.com was less enthusiastic than other reviewers, faulting a lack of originality and faulting the quality of both action and horror elements.

Critics gave Awakened a mixed reception. Lynch called it the best part of Dead Space 3 due to its focus on Isaac's mental state; he, however, criticized its status as DLC rather than being part of the main game. Carsillo praised the DLC's psychological elements but faulted its plot and lack of new environments. Evans-Thirlwell enjoyed it as an extension of the game experience but criticized its recycling of game assets. McInnis enjoyed the new cult enemies but generally faulted it for a lack of new elements in environments and combat. Richard Mitchell writing for Joystiq enjoyed the expansions to the lore but noted the DLC's lack of new gameplay elements made it a hard sell. Whitehead summed up the DLC as "short and insulting", saying its only redeeming element is the sound gameplay carried over from the main game, and calling it otherwise unenjoyable given its price. Plot holes surrounding the protagonists' fates and the DLC's short length were generally criticized.

=== Sales ===
In the United States, Dead Space 3 was the top-selling game in February 2013, according to the NPD Group. It sold 605,000 copies in North America during its debut month. In the first week of sales in the United Kingdom, Dead Space 3 peaked at number one on sales charts but sales were more than 20% less than those of Dead Space 2. Both Dead Space 3 and Crysis 3, which were released in the same month, failed to meet Electronic Arts' sales expectations though no sales figures for either game were released.

== Future ==
Prior to Dead Space 3's release, a report indicated Electronic Arts wanted to move the series away from the survival-horror genre once the Dead Space trilogy was complete. During production of Dead Space 3, the team created story and gameplay concepts for the next game, which would have focused on the protagonist scavenging to survive as humanity neared extinction; Wanat envisioned the protagonist as Ellie rather than Isaac. The gameplay would have expanded upon the open, brief, zero-gravity sections in Dead Space 3, redesigned the Necromorphs to work in zero-gravity environments, reworked the crafting system, and incorporated a variety of ships to explore. There was also a concept for the Necromorphs' origin and the measures humanity might have to take to avoid extinction. Ultimately, plans for a fourth Dead Space game were abandoned as the team disbanded to work on other projects. Wanat had material planned for up to an envisioned fifth game.

Following the release of Dead Space 3, rumors Electronic Arts had canceled the series emerged; the company denied these rumors and stated Visceral Games was working on other properties at the time. Visceral Games had shifted to work on Battlefield Hardline, which allowed them to become accustomed to the Frostbite game engine, which Electronic Arts was mandating for all of its in-house games. Visceral Games was closed in 2017 amid production on a Star Wars video game project. The Dead Space series remained dormant until the 2021 announcement of a remake of the first game, which was developed by Motive Studios. The developers took into account feedback from the series when developing the remake, saying microtransactions would be omitted. The Dead Space remake was released on January 27, 2023, for PlayStation 5, Windows, and Xbox Series X/S. In a 2023 interview, Chuck Beaver, a story producer on Dead Space 3, said that if given the opportunity, he would redo most of the game. In December 2024, the original creators, including executive producer Glen Schofield, creative director Bret Robbins, and animation director Christopher Stone, stated that they had pitched an idea for a fourth Dead Space game to Electronic Arts earlier that year, but the company rejected it.
