= Project Ragtag =

Cancelled video game

- Developer: Visceral Games (Note: Additional work by EA Vancouver and Motive Studio)
- Publisher: Electronic Arts
- Director: Amy Hennig
- Producer: Julian Beak
- Writer: Amy Hennig
- Engine: Frostbite 3
- Platforms: PlayStation 4; Windows; Xbox One
- Release: Cancelled
- Genres: Action-adventure, third-person shooter
- Mode: Single-player

Project Ragtag was a codename for an untitled action-adventure third-person shooter video game set within the Star Wars universe. It had been under development by Visceral Games since around 2013 and set to be published by Electronic Arts before its cancellation in 2017. The project was led by the creator of the Uncharted series, Amy Hennig. It was to be a linear game about a large-scale heist, taking place in the wake of events of Star Wars IV: A New Hope. EA Vancouver and Motive Studio had assisted the game's development. Visceral Games was shut down by Electronic Arts on October 17, 2017, and the game's development was rebooted by EA Vancouver to become an open world title. Despite this, the project was reportedly cancelled.

== Development ==
In early 2013, Disney had acquired Lucasfilm and shut down its game development studio LucasArts. Electronic Arts (EA) made an exclusive deal to help develop lucrative Star Wars games through three of its studios, including Visceral. Visceral was working on Jamaica, a pirate-themed project at that time. EA cancelled the Jamaica project in favor of a Star Wars game. The studio opted to pitch a third-person action game that maintained the spirit of Jamaica, having players play as "space scoundrels" in an open-world-style Star Wars universe, and code-named this project as Yuma.

Battlefield Hardline became a company-wide priority for the studio as its development became troubled in 2014. The switch to a different engine, style of gameplay, and narrative caused Yuma's production to stall. During the last year of development for Hardline, Amy Hennig, the writer for the first three Uncharted games from Naughty Dog, was brought into EA for Visceral as a creative director for a future Star Wars project. Hennig did not want to make a non-linear experience like Yuma was originally intended to be but instead opted to create a linear narrative game. Hennig stated that as she started the project, she found both Star Wars and Uncharted were based on pulp adventures, but while Uncharted had its roots in the single-protagonist Indiana Jones, Star Wars was more akin to heist films with an ensemble cast, comparable to The Dirty Dozen or Where Eagles Dare. These films shared the same nature of a haphazard group of people coming to work together to pull off a stint, thus leading her to give the project the name Ragtag. This effectively became a new game, maintaining the "space scoundrel" approach and making it about a large-scale heist, taking place in the wake of events of Star Wars IV: A New Hope, fitting into the canon of the series amid the anthology films and animated series. Gameplay would have included the player switching between multiple character viewpoints, akin to the format used in the Star Wars films, as parts of the heist came together. Several of the former Visceral employees called the game's goal's "lofty", and there was significant trouble in adapting the Frostbite engine for third-person shooters. They also stated that there were several creative gates they had to pass with Disney/Lucasfilm for character design and art assets, and described internal conflicts with Hennig, believing that she wanted strong creative control of the game.

After Hardline finally shipped in 2015, EA let go of Visceral's General Manager Steve Papoutsis and replaced him with Larry Probst's son, Scott. EA further flattened the structure at Visceral to give the creative leads more power, mirroring the structure at Naughty Dog. Half of the team was assigned to Ragtag, and the rest to downloadable content for Hardline. At the time that pre-production started on Ragtag in mid-2015, about 30 employees were assigned to it, with plans to bring the remaining 30 aboard once they completed Hardline. Such numbers were too small for a large game, and to avoid having to lure in more programmers to the San Francisco area and its high cost-of-living, they established Motive Studios in Montreal, led by Jade Raymond, the original producer of the Assassin's Creed series, with their first project to work with Visceral on the Star Wars title. This added an additional 70 people to Ragtag's development team. Around that time, tensions between Visceral and EA arose over the direction of the game on two issues: the lack of any recognized Star Wars characters or Jedi force powers despite having been given creative freedom to create new characters from Disney/Lucasfilm, and the expectation that Ragtag would be a critically praised game with a high Metacritic score as to challenge the upcoming Uncharted 4.

== Cancellation ==
EA released Star Wars Battlefront in November 2015, which was extremely successful. Because of this, Visceral found that EA started to draw away from Ragtag, and instead funnel more of its studios into Battlefront's sequel, Star Wars Battlefront II; Motive Studios were taken off Ragtag, and Visceral was not allowed to hire additional staff. During 2016, EA laid off some of Visceral's staff, and others left for other positions, leaving Ragtag's development stalled. Visceral knew they had to make a good game demo to get further development funding from EA, and began work on this in 2016. Part of this demo was shown at E3 2016 in June of that year. With more of Visceral's staff leaving, EA opted to bring its EA Vancouver team to help with Ragtag's development. While this provided extra man-power to expand the demo, the new structure enforced in Visceral made it seem to the developers that EA was positioning EA Vancouver to take over the project.

The team presented its internal demo to EA for a gate review in April 2017, and were given the green light to continue development, with expectations to have another review six months later. Visceral worked to get the demo in place, and showed it to EA in mid-October 2017, but based on the state of the demo EA made the decision to close down Visceral days later on October 17, 2017. According to Hennig, EA had already planned to cancel Ragtag a few months earlier, and only formally made this decision after the October demo. EA reassigned the Star Wars game to its EA Worldwide Studios, led by EA Vancouver, and said they will revamp the gameplay, which had been described as a linear, story-heavy title, into "a broader experience that allows for more variety and player agency".

== Impact and potential revival ==
Journalists saw the closure of Visceral as a sign of the waning interest in publishers in making games that are strictly single player, as many of Visceral's games had been. In light of these concerns, EA's CEO Andrew Wilson stated that the reason for Visceral's closure wasn't a single-play versus multiplayer game issue, but instead one based on listening to player feedback and following marketplace trends. The company felt that the current design of Ragtag was not fitting these changes and that the closure of Visceral and reassignment to another studio was because "we needed to pivot the design". EA's CFO Blake Jorgensen further said that their company found the game was too linear for what they felt consumers were looking for and towards EA's goal of pushing the game "to the next level". At the time of Visceral's closure, the studio was down to about 80 staff after losing several over the years, which Jorgensen said was a "sub-scale nature" that required them to assign EA's Vancouver and Montreal studios to help, and that the closure was primarily a business, cost-saving measure. Kotaku's Jason Schreier reported on end of the game's development at Visceral in October 2017.

In June 2018, Hennig announced that she had left EA earlier that year in January. While Hennig had been involved with some of the initial work at EA Vancouver, she stated the new game was more open-world and far different from the title Visceral had developed. However at the time of her departure, she stated that the Star Wars game was stalled and EA Vancouver was working on something very different. In January 2019, sources told Kotaku that the game at EA Vancouver had been cancelled.

In April 2019, EA announced a new single-player game, Star Wars Jedi: Fallen Order, to be released later that year and developed by Respawn Entertainment. Hennig stated that this seemed like a change of strategy related to the criticism that EA received after its closure of Visceral and its strong indication that it was moving away from single-player games. The Electronic Arts' exclusivity deal with Lucasfilm for Star Wars games expired in 2023 leading to multiple games: In April 2022, it was announced that Skydance New Media would be collaborating with Lucasfilm Games to produce an action-adventure game based in the Star Wars Universe, with Hennig serving as head of the project. Ubisoft released Star Wars Outlaws in 2024, which drew comparisons to Ragtag.
