= Dead Space (2008 video game) =

Survival horror game

- Developer: EA Redwood Shores
- Publisher: Electronic Arts
- Directors: Michael Condrey; Bret Robbins
- Producers: Chuck Beaver; Steve Papoutsis
- Designer: Paul Mathus
- Programmer: Steve Timson
- Artist: Ian Milham
- Writers: Warren Ellis; Rick Remender; Antony Johnston
- Composer: Jason Graves
- Series: Dead Space
- Platforms: PlayStation 3; Xbox 360; Windows
- Release: NA: October 13, 2008; NA: October 20, 2008 (Windows); AU: October 23, 2008; EU: October 24, 2008
- Genre: Survival horror
- Mode: Single-player

Dead Space is a 2008 survival horror game developed by EA Redwood Shores and published by Electronic Arts. It was released for PlayStation 3, Xbox 360, and Windows as the debut entry in the Dead Space series. Set on a mining spaceship overrun by deadly monsters called Necromorphs following the discovery of an artifact called the Marker, the player controls engineer Isaac Clarke as he navigates the spaceship and fights the Necromorphs while struggling with growing psychosis. Gameplay has Isaac exploring different areas through its narrative, solving environmental puzzles and finding ammunition and equipment to survive.

Dead Space was pitched in early 2006, with an early prototype running on Xbox. Creator Glen Schofield wanted to make the most frightening horror game he could imagine, drawing inspiration from the video game Resident Evil 4 and films including Event Horizon and Solaris. The team pushed for innovation and realism in their design, ranging from procedural enemy placement to removing HUD elements. The sound design was a particular focus during production, with the score by Jason Graves designed to evoke tension and unease.

Dead Space debuted to slow sales but eventually sold over one million copies worldwide. Critics praised its atmosphere, gameplay, and sound design. It won and was nominated for multiple industry awards and has been cited as one of the best video games ever made. The series spawned two numbered sequels (Dead Space 2 in 2011 and Dead Space 3 in 2013), several spin-off titles, and other related media, including a comic book prequel and an animated film. A remake was released for Windows, PlayStation 5, and Xbox Series X/S in 2023.

== Gameplay ==
Dead Space is a science fiction survival horror video game. Players take on the role of Isaac Clarke, controlling him from a third-person view. Players navigate level-based sections of the spaceship Ishimura, completing narrative-driven missions, solving physics puzzles within the environment, and fighting monsters called Necromorphs. In the vacuum Isaac has a limited air supply, which can be replenished by finding air tanks within the environment. Some areas are subject to zero-G, with both Isaac and specific enemy types able to jump between surfaces; these areas have dedicated puzzles. During exploration of the Ishimura, Isaac finds ammunition, health pickups, and Nodes that are used to both unlock special doors and upgrade weapons and Isaac's suit. At certain points in the ship, Isaac can access a store to buy supplies and ammunition. Isaac can use a navigation line to find the next mission objective.

Isaac fighting a Necromorph with the Plasma Cutter

Isaac can stomp to break supply crates and attack enemies, and punch to kill smaller enemies and repel larger ones. Two more abilities unlocked during the game are Kinesis, which can move or pull objects in the environment, and Stasis, which slows movement for a limited time. All gameplay displays are diegetic, appearing in-world as holographic projections. Isaac's health and energy levels are displayed on the back of his suit, and ammunition count appears when weapons are raised. All information displays—control prompts, pick-ups, video calls, the game map, inventory, store fronts—appear as holographic displays. While the player is browsing menus, time in the game does not pause.

While exploring, Isaac must fight Necromorphs, which appear from vents, or awaken from corpses scattered throughout the ship. The various types of Necromorphs have different abilities and require altered tactics to defeat. Depending on how they are wounded, Necromorphs can adopt new stances and tactics, such as sprouting new limbs or giving birth to new enemies. Isaac can access multiple weapons to combat the Necromorphs, which can only be killed by severing their limbs. To do this, Isaac uses weapons designed for cutting. The initial weapon is picked up during the first level, while others can be crafted using blueprints discovered in different levels. Workbenches found in levels can be used by Isaac to increase the power or other attributes of his weapons and suit. Beating the game unlocks New Game+, which gives Isaac access to a new outfit, extra credits and equipment, as well as new video and audio logs. It also unlocks a higher difficulty setting.

== Synopsis ==
=== Setting and characters ===
Dead Space is set in the year 2508, a time when humanity has spread throughout the universe. Following near-extinction of humans on Earth due to resource shortages, ships dubbed "Planetcrackers" are being used to harvest resources from barren planets. The oldest Planetcracker is the USG Ishimura, which is performing an illegal mining operation on the planet Aegis VII. The backstory reveals that Aegis VII was the home of a "Red Marker", a manmade copy of the original alien Marker monolith discovered on Earth. Attempts to weaponise the Marker and its copies led to the creation of a virus-like organism that infected corpses and transformed them into undead creatures called Necromorphs. Two key factions in Dead Space are the Earth Government ("EarthGov"), which created and then hid the Red Markers, and "Unitology", a religious movement that worships the Markers. Unitology was founded in the name of original researcher Michael Altman.

In the events leading up to Dead Space, the colony on Aegis VII discovers the Red Marker hidden there. Following its discovery and the Ishimura's arrival, first the colonists, and then the ship's crew, begin suffering from hallucinations and eventually severe mental illness, climaxing in the emergence of the Necromorphs. By the time the maintenance ship Kellion arrives, the entire Aegis VII colony, and all but a few of the Ishimura crew, have been killed or turned into Necromorphs.

The game's protagonist is Isaac Clarke, an engineer who travels on the Kellion to find out what happened to his girlfriend Nicole Brennan, the Ishimura's senior medical officer. Aboard the Kellion with Isaac are chief security officer Zach Hammond and computer technician Kendra Daniels. Unbeknownst to the Kellion crew, Kendra is an Earth government agent sent to control the situation. Other characters encountered by Isaac on the Ishimura are Challus Mercer, an insane scientist who believes the necromorphs are humanity's ascended form; Dr. Terrence Kyne, a survivor who wants to return the Marker to Aegis VII; and Nicole, who mysteriously communicates with and appears to Isaac at various points through the ship.

=== Plot ===
Isaac arrives at Aegis VII on the Kellion with Kendra and Hammond. During the journey, Isaac has been repeatedly watching a video message from Nicole. A docking malfunction crashes the Kellion into the Ishimura's landing bay, and the ship's quarantine is broken. Necromorphs kill all the Kellion crew but Isaac, Kendra, and Hammond. Isaac sets off to explore the Ishimura, restoring systems and finding parts with which to repair the ship, so that they may escape. They almost succeed, but the Kellion is destroyed in a further malfunction. During these events, all three survivors begin experiencing escalating symptoms of psychosis and delirium, ranging from hallucinations to paranoia.

During his exploration, Isaac learns through audio and video logs about the events that transpired prior to their arrival: The Ishimura's illegal mining operation on Aegis VII, which was designated off-limits by the Earth Government, was meant to find the Red Marker for the Church of Unitology. The Aegis VII colony was almost wiped out by mass psychosis triggered by the Marker, causing killings and suicides. The Marker was brought aboard the Ishimura, along with survivors and bodies from the colony. A combination of the Marker's influence, factional fighting and the emerging Necromorph invasion resulted in the deaths of nearly everyone aboard. Isaac finds the two remaining survivors of the Ishimura crew: science officer Dr. Terrence Kyne, who has abandoned his belief in Unitology, and his colleague Dr. Challus Mercer, who has gone insane and worships the Necromorphs.

Despite Isaac's efforts, Hammond is killed by a Necromorph, and Mercer allows himself to be transformed by them. Another ship, the Valor, arrives and is infected through an Ishimura escape pod containing a Necromorph; records show that the Valor was dispatched to remove all traces of the Ishimura's presence. Kendra kills Kyne before revealing her Earth Government allegiance, as the deranged Kyne threatened to return the Marker to the Necromorphs' controlling "Hive Mind" on the planet. The Marker was left on Aegis VII as part of an experiment, and Earth wants it retrieved. Reunited with Nicole, Isaac sabotages Kendra's attempt to escape the Ishimura, returns the Marker to Aegis VII, neutralising the Necromorphs and initiating Aegis VII's collapse.

Kendra retrieves the Marker and reveals to Isaac that his encounters with Nicole were hallucinations created by the Marker to return it to the Hive Mind. Nicole's message had ended with her committing suicide to avoid becoming a Necromorph. Kendra is killed by the awoken Hive Mind before she can escape with the Marker. After killing the Hive Mind, Isaac leaves on Kendra's shuttle as both Aegis VII and the Marker are destroyed. In the shuttle, a distraught Isaac mourns Nicole and is attacked by a violent hallucination of her.

== Production ==
=== Development ===
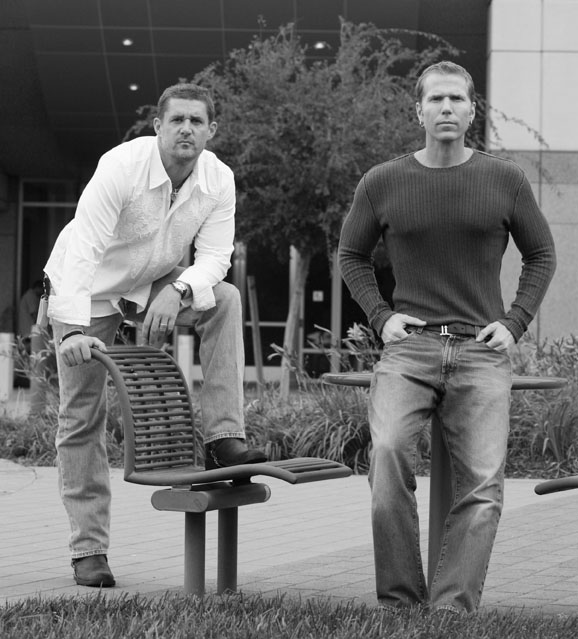
Glen Schofield and Michael Condrey were the respective executive producer and co-director of Dead Space.

Dead Space was the creation of Glen Schofield, at the time working at EA Redwood Shores. Schofield wanted to create what he felt would be the most frightening horror game possible. His concept drew influence from Resident Evil 4 (2005), and the Silent Hill series. EA Redwood Shores had established itself as a studio for licensed game properties, and the team saw an opportunity to branch out into original properties, establishing themselves as "a proper game studio", according to co-producer Steve Papoutsis. During this early stage, the game was known as Rancid Moon. Dead Space was described as a project that multiple staff at Redwood Shores wanted to work on for many years. Co-director Michael Condrey described it in 2014 as a grassroots-style project where the team were eager to prove themselves, but not expecting the game to become anything large-scale. When they pitched the game to parent company Electronic Arts in early 2006, they were given three months to create a prototype.

In order to get a playable concept ready within that time, the prototype was developed on the original Xbox hardware. The team decided that it would be better to get something playable, before planning how to make the game work on next-generation hardware. Their twin approaches of early demos and aggressive internal promotion ran counter to Electronic Arts practises for new games at the time. Electronic Arts eventually approved the game after seeing a vertical slice equivalent to one level, by which time all the basic gameplay elements had been settled upon. According to co-producer Chuck Beaver, this pre-greenlight work lasted 18 months. After approval, and using their experience creating the vertical slice, the team built eleven more levels in ten months. The team reused the game engine they had designed for The Godfather, which was chosen because it had been tailored to their development style, supported the necessary environmental effects, and implemented the Havok physics engine.

=== Game design ===
Schofield wanted to create a game that ran counter to Electronic Art's usual output. To help guide the team, Schofield often described Dead Space as "Resident Evil in space". There are different accounts of the game's relationship with the System Shock series. Condrey said that Dead Space was influenced only by System Shock and System Shock 2. Co-designer Ben Wanat stated that the team were originally planning a third entry in the System Shock series, and played through the originals for reference, but when Resident Evil 4 was released, they decided to make their own intellectual property based around its gameplay. While greatly influenced by Resident Evil 4, Schofield wanted to make the game more active, as the necessity to stop and shoot in Resident Evil 4 often broke his immersion. The gameplay balance was aimed somewhere between the faster pace of third-person shooters and the slower pace of horror games. Resource management underwent constant tuning and balancing to make the game tense, but not unfair or frustrating.

Immersion was a core element of the game, with HUD elements being in-universe, and story sequences like cutscenes and audio or video logs playing in real-time. In addition, the standard HUD elements were incorporated into the environment with suitable contextual or overt in-game explanations. In the team's opinion, the setting was better realised and conveyed as a side effect of this approach. A quick turn option was implemented and removed several times during production; it was finally removed because mapping the feature to the last available controller buttons caused test players to turn, accidentally, during dangerous situations. The Windows version of the control scheme went through several different configurations, with the team wanting the best possible configuration for mouse and keyboard.

One of the founding gameplay principles was "strategic dismemberment", the focus on severing limbs to kill enemies. This distinguished Dead Space from the majority of shooters, which instead placed focus on headshots, or allowed volleys of weapons fire against enemies. Weapons accuracy and enemy behaviour were adjusted around this concept. For example, enemies became enraged by traditional headshots and charged at the player, rather than being killed instantly. A two-person co-op multiplayer option was prototyped over a three-month period, but was eventually cut so that the team could focus on making a polished single-player experience.

A procedural element was created for enemy placement, such that enemies would appear at random points within a room; thus, players could not memorise and counterattack against patterns. There was a mechanism for controlling where enemies would spawn from places like vents, depending on the player's position. One gameplay sequence, where Isaac is ambushed and dragged down a hallway by a large tentacle, stalled development for a month. The team initially planned it as an instant death, then changed the attack to be an interactive one that Isaac had to escape. A dedicated set of mechanics and animations had to be created for the sequence, and Schofield admitted that the way and order he assigned tasks stopped the sequence working properly. To make the sequence work, the team shifted to a "layered" production structure which focused on finishing one section at a time, so that they could pinpoint problems with ease. The team had to cut two other unspecified pieces to allow the tentacle sequence to work. Ultimately this problem helped build up team confidence, allowing them to tackle other problems in the game and add more content.

The character animation was designed to be realistic, with extensive transitional animations to smooth out shifts between different stances for both the player, other characters and enemies. The zero-G sections were in place alongside the setting, and the team performed extensive research on real space exploration and survival to get the atmosphere and movement right. Implementing zero-G was difficult, with Beaver describing the process as "months and months and months of work". While technically easy to achieve by switching off gravity values in Havok, reprogramming sections to be convincing and fun to play presented different challenges. Isaac needed a separate series of animations for zero-G environments, with his sluggish movement achieved by animation director Chris Stone doing an exaggerated stomping walk with bungee cables strapped to his legs. Due to the number of ways Isaac could die, his model was given dozens of points where he could be torn apart, and the death scenes became a part of the game's visual identity. A key issue for the team when designing the horror elements was not reusing the same scares too many times, and allowing for moments of safety for the player without completely losing the tension. In earlier builds, the team made extensive use of jump scares, but as they grew less frightening they were thinned out, and more emphasis was placed on the in-game atmosphere.

=== Scenario and art design ===
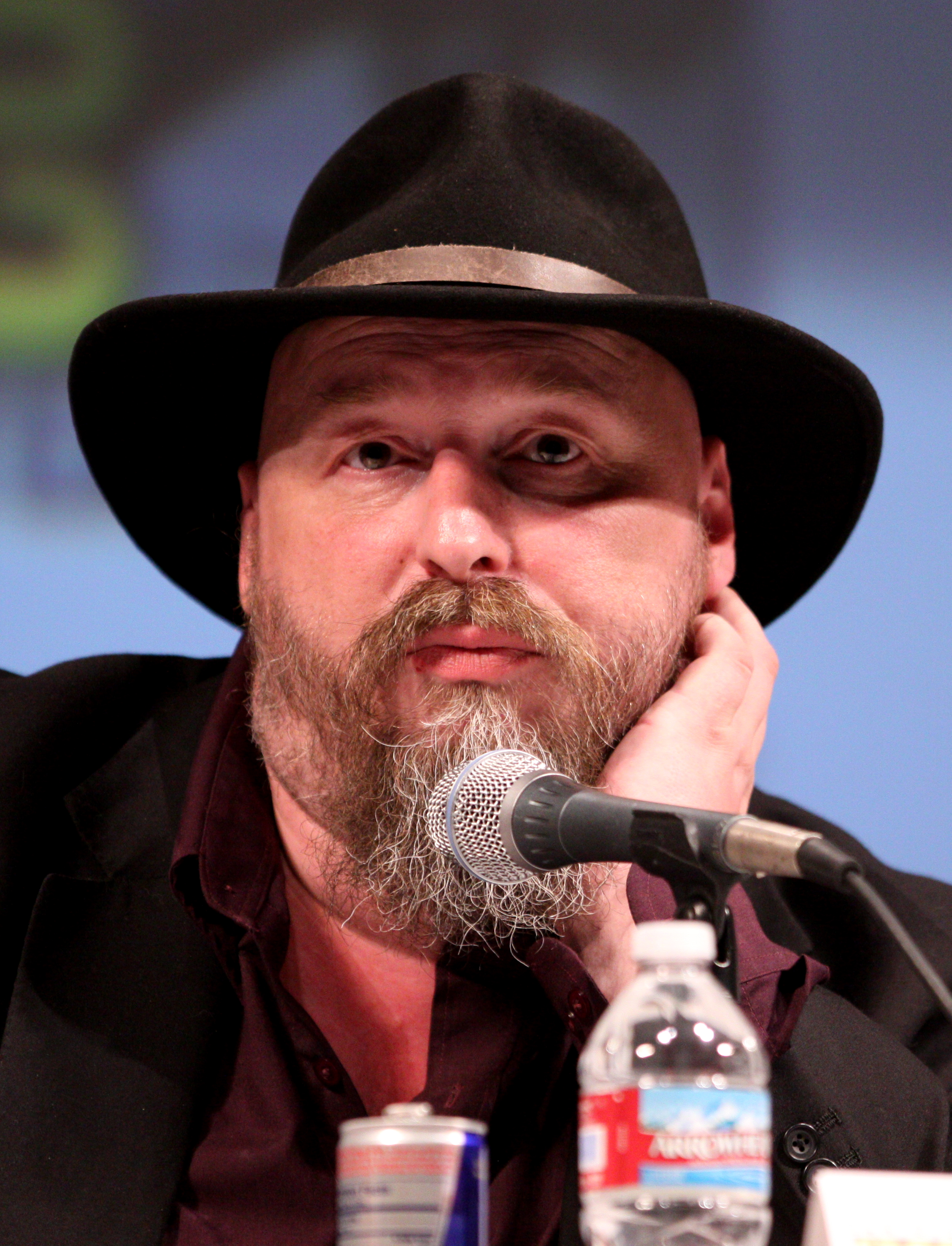
Warren Ellis

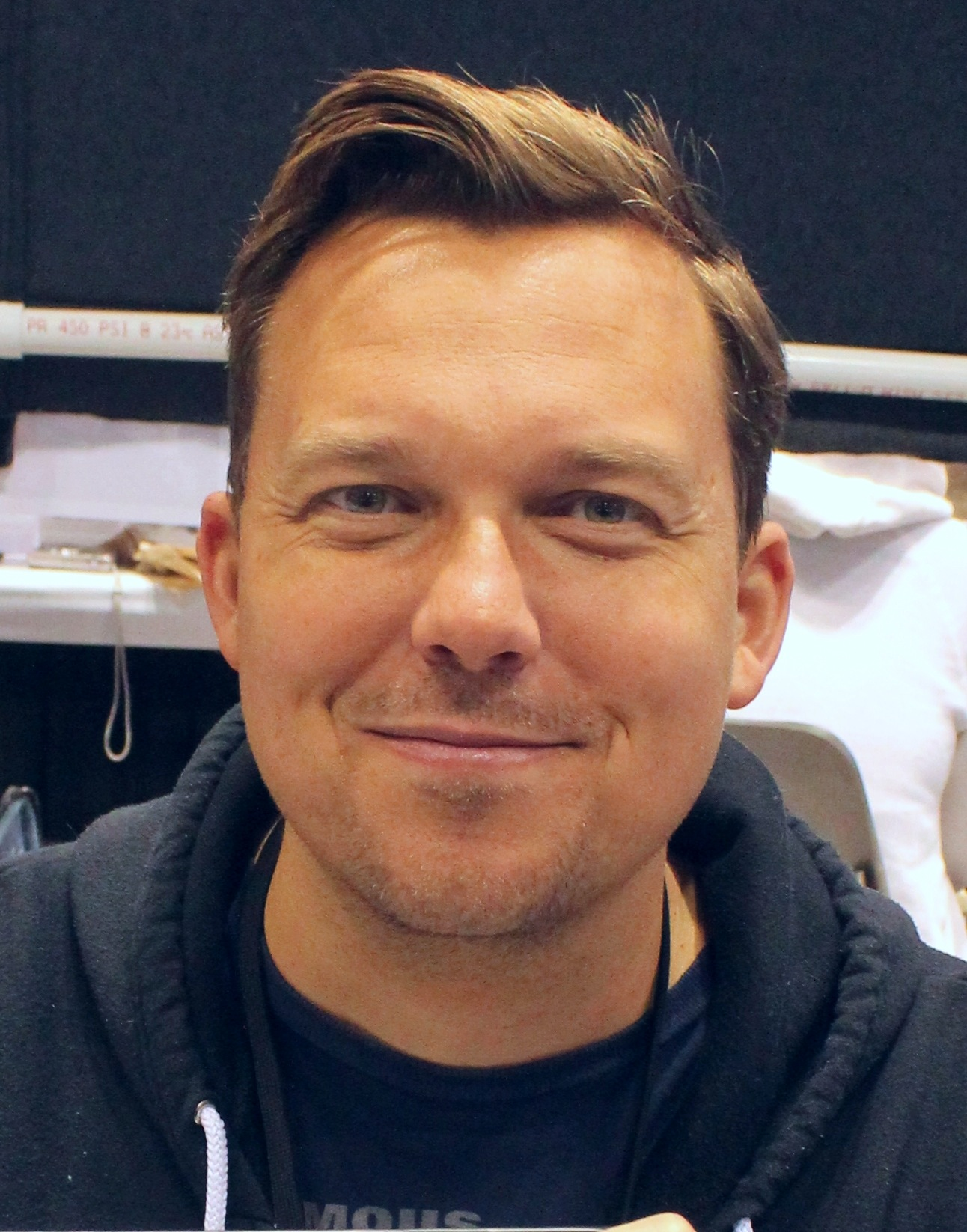
Rick Remender

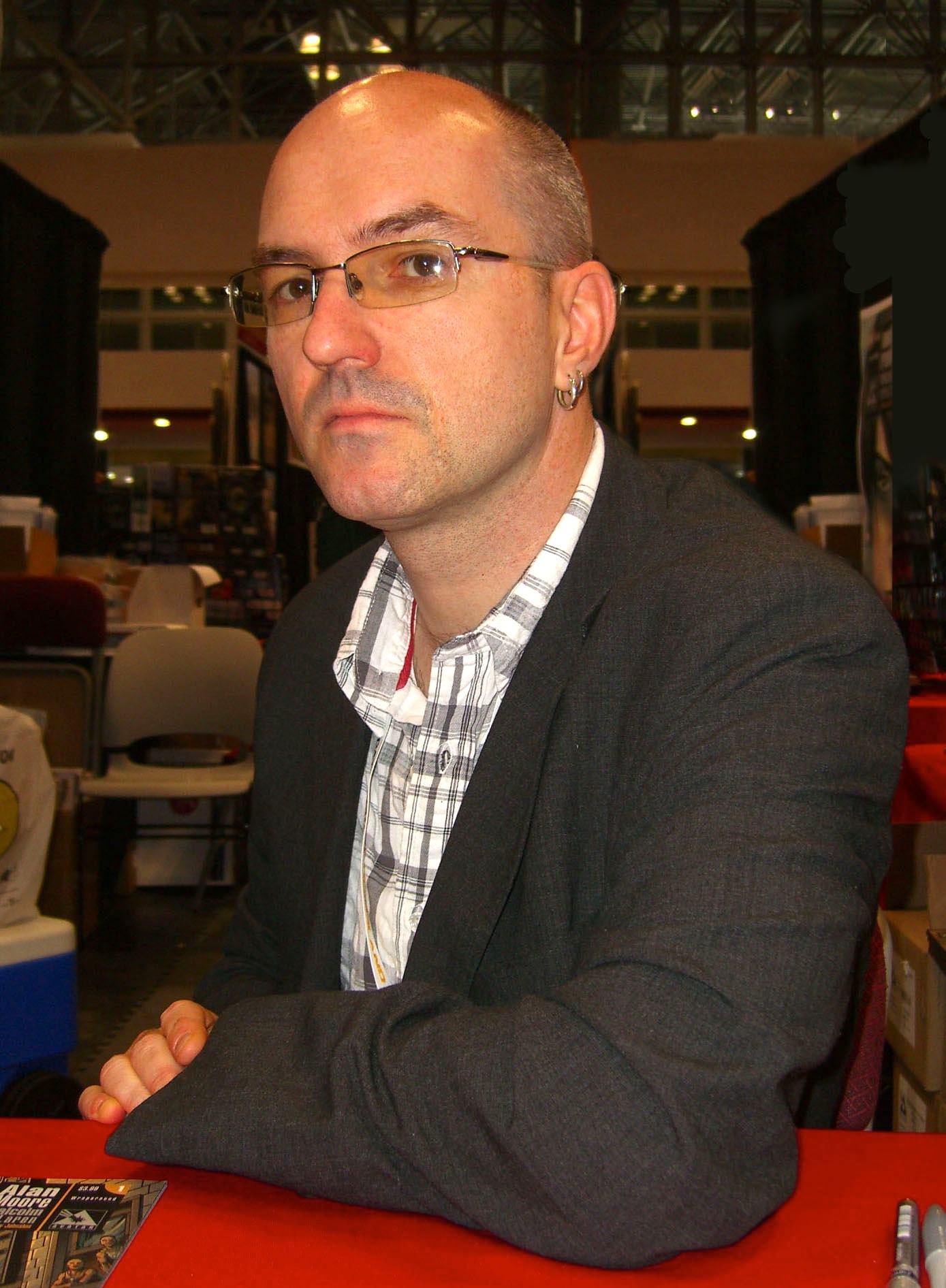
Antony Johnston

The basic scenario was written by Ellis, Remender worked on the bulk of the script, while later dialogue and additions were made by Johnston.

When the game was still titled Rancid Moon, Schofield envisioned a scenario similar to Escape from New York, set on a prison planet in outer space. The team liked the "space" element, but disliked the prison setting. In contrast with many game productions at the time, where the story had a low priority, the team chose to have the story defined from the outset, then build the levels and objectives around it. The first solid concept was the mining of planets by humans, with the twist that one planet they mine holds something dangerous. Due to the focus on player immersion, there were little to no traditional cutscenes, with all the narrative being communicated through real-time interaction.

The themes of religion and rogue states outside Earth's control were decided upon to ground the science fiction narrative. Unitology emerged five months into development, as Schofield felt that something was missing. After reading up on the Chicxulub crater, Schofield wrote the original Marker as the object which caused the crater, and built Unitology around it. The specifics of Unitology were created by Wanat and Beaver, who created pieces of the religious lore as needed to fit the scenario's needs. The main concept behind Unitology was examining the effects of a religion or cult when it grows out of control, in addition to the corruptive influence of bad people on people through religion. In response to a later comparison of Unitology with Scientology, it was described as representing irrational thought and action prompted by the unknown. Creating Unitology was an easy part of development, and the team were fairly relaxed about the themes surrounding it as it was intended as an analogy of religion as a whole rather than specific criticism of a single belief system.

A key early inspiration for the game's tone was the film Event Horizon. Schofield cited the film's use of visual storytelling and camera work, referencing a particular scene where the audience sees a scene of gore missed by the on-screen character, as an early inspiration. Another strong influence on Schofield was the French horror film Martyrs. Several elements made reference to other science fiction movies: Isaac's struggle was compared to that of Ellen Ripley from Alien; the dementia suffered by characters referenced Solaris; the sense of desperation mirrored that in the story of Sunshine. How the story was conveyed was a mechanical challenge, due to both the real-time elements and the ability to complete some objectives out of order.

The scenario was a collaborative effort between Warren Ellis, Rick Remender and Antony Johnston. Ellis created a lot of the background lore and groundwork. This draft was given to Remender, who wrote out planned scenes, added some scenes of his own, and performed rewrites before the script was handed to Johnston. Johnston, who was involved in writing the game's additional media, worked references to those other works into the game's script. While the scripting process lasted two years, Johnston only worked on the game for the last eight months of that time. Much of his work focused on the dialogue, which had to fit around key events which had already been solidified. Johnston also contributed heavily to the audio logs, which he used to create additional storyline and flesh out the narrative. The organizations referenced in the story were described by Beaver as "really rough tent poles in the background story so it could stand on its own".

Isaac, with his non-military role and backstory, was meant to appeal to players as an average person who was not trained for combat or survival. His armour and weapon design followed the principle of him being an untrained engineer; the armour is a work suit for conditions compared by staff to an oil rig in space, while the weapons are mining tools. Isaac's name made reference to two science fiction authors, Isaac Asimov and Arthur C. Clarke. The design of the ship environments deliberately moved away from traditional science fiction, which they saw as being overly clean and lacking function. The large number of familiar environments and designs, in addition to making the Ishimura a believable living environment, increased the horror elements, as they would be familiar to players. To achieve the realistic feel, they emulated Gothic architecture, which fit their vision both practically and aesthetically. The lighting was based on light from the strong lamps used in dentistry.

The Necromorphs were designed by Wanat. Similar to the ship design, Wanat designed the Necromorphs to be realistic and relatable. His approach to them was to illustrate how the human form looked after it was "ravaged by a violent transformation that literally ripped it inside out". They retained elements of their original human form, increasing their disturbing nature. As reference, the team used medical images and scenes from car crashes, copying injuries and incorporating them into the monster designs. Those images were also used as reference for the dead bodies scattered round the environment. The Necromorphs' multi-limbed or tentacled appearance was dictated by the dismemberment gameplay, as having enemies without limbs would not work in that context. Their in-universe naming drew inspiration from the kind of code naming that happens in war zones among soldiers.

=== Audio ===
==== Sound design ====
Schofield insisted from an early stage that emphasis be placed on the music and audio design to promote the horror atmosphere. The sound work was led by Don Veca, and the team included Andrew Lackey, Dave Feise and Dave Swenson. Each member's work often overlapped with others. Feise, the first member to join, mostly worked on weapon designs and the "tweaky futuristic synth" elements. Swenson was described as a jack of all trades, working on a wide array of elements and in particular creating impact sounds and handling the more scripted linear sections. Lackey's contributions focused on boss fights and the opening sections. Despite Veca's executive role, he "stayed in the trenches" as much as possible and worked on every aspect of the sound design. For one of the areas in the game, which had no enemies but relied on sound and lighting, audio director Don Veca used sounds recorded from a Bay Area Rapid Transit train; the results were described by Schofield as a "horrible sound". The monster noises used a base of human noises; as an example, the small Lurker enemies used human baby sounds as a base mixed in other noises such as panther growls.

As with other elements of production, the team wanted to emphasise realism. When it came to zero-G environments, they muted and muffled any sound and focused on noises from within Isaac's suit, as these mirrored actual experiences in a space vacuum. The sounds played into gameplay, as the team wanted players to use sound cues to help anticipate enemy attacks while also stoking their fear. The team wanted to recreate the scripted sound design of linear horror films in an interactive environment. They watched their favorite horror films, noting their use of sound effects and music, and implementing them into Dead Space. One of the constant issues was optimising the limited amount of RAM the team had for both music and sound effects, which partly inspired the development of specific tools rather than using popular sound design systems.

The dialogue and voice implementation was handled by Andrea Plastas and Jason Heffel. The voice audio was recorded during motion capture sessions with the actors. The cast included Iyari Limon as Nicole, Tonantzin Carmelo as Kendra, Peter Mensah as Hammond, and Keith Szarabajka as Kyne. Isaac is a masked silent protagonist, so the team worked to incorporate personality into his appearance and movements, with a large number of animations for his various conditions and actions. This approach was based on the portrayal of Gordon Freeman in Half-Life 2. A vetoed suggestion from Electronic Arts in early production was that a famous actor should portray Isaac.

To control the sound design elements, the team created custom software tools. One of the tools they created was dubbed "Fear Emitters", which controlled the volume of music and sound effects based on distance from threats or key events. Other sound tools included "Creepy Ambi Patch", which acted as a multitrack organiser for the various sound layers and added randomised internal sounds to create a greater sense of dread; "Visual Effects", which incorporated sound effects naturally into the environment and to specific areas; and "Deadscript", a scripting language developed as a replacement for a sound language later used for Spore that was taking up too much space in the game's code.

==== Music ====
The music of Dead Space was composed by Jason Graves. Graves worked with Veca to create a soundtrack that was dark and "Aleatoric in style", taking inspiration from the work of Christopher Young and the music of The Shining. When Graves got the job, he was told that the team wanted "the scariest music anyone had ever heard". As part of his research, Graves listened to a lot of modern experimental orchestral music. He based the musical style on the name Necromorph itself, with "Necro" meaning "death" and "morph" meaning "to change"; he wanted to make a musical version of that concept.

The music recording sessions took place at the studio of Skywalker Sound, with different sections recording for Graves to create multiple layers of sound. The final in-game score for Dead Space was three hours long and recorded over five months, several times more than Graves had composed for previous video game titles. Graves described it as the most challenging and enjoyable composing job he had undertaken for a game, praising the amount of freedom he was given by the sound team.

== Release ==
Dead Space was announced in September 2007. Dead Space formed part of a strategy formed under Electronic Arts's new management to push new original intellectual properties over their previous licensed properties. The website went live in March 2008, featuring screenshots from the game, an animated trailer, a developer blog, and a dedicated forum. The game received a large amount of marketing support from Electronic Arts. Initially, Dead Space Community Manager Andrew Green stated that Germany, China and Japan banned the game. However, it was confirmed that this was a marketing ploy and that Dead Space was not banned in any country.

In North America, the PlayStation 3 and Xbox 360 versions of Dead Space released on October 13, 2008, with the PC version releasing on October 20. All versions released in Australia on October 23, and in Europe on October 24. The PC version was one of the Electronic Arts releases protected by the controversial digital rights management (DRM) system SecuROM. Electronic Arts released an Ultra Limited Edition of the game limited to 1,000 copies. The package includes the game, Dead Space: Downfall, a bonus content DVD, the Dead Space art book, a lithograph and the Dead Space comic. The people who bought the game within the first two weeks of its release could download the exclusive suits for free: the Obsidian Suit for the PlayStation 3 version and the Elite Suit for the Xbox 360 version. After release, additional gameplay perks in the form of suits and weapons were released as paid downloadable content.

=== Related media ===
Alongside the video game, the Dead Space team and Electronic Arts created a multimedia universe around the game to both promote it and show off different elements of its lore and story referenced in the game. This positive response and development was prompted by enthusiasm for the vertical slice demo. The first media expansion was a limited comic series written by Johnston and illustrated by Ben Templesmith, running between March and September 2008. The next was an animated film, Dead Space: Downfall, produced by Film Roman and released in October 2008. The comic covers the five weeks following the Marker's discovery on Aegis VII, while Downfall reveals how the Ishimura was overtaken.

In addition, Electronic Arts launched an episodic alternate reality game with a dedicated website titled No Known Survivors. No Known Survivors was developed by web creator Deep Focus. The challenge for Deep Focus was creating an immersive experience which would excite potential players, while being unique to the online environment. According to Creative Director Nick Braccia, the aim was to take pieces of the Dead Space lore and "blow [them] up" in ways that could only work in this environment. The production lasted fourteen months. While more interactive events were considered, the production timeline meant several concepts were cut. The point and click interface style, and the limited exploration space of a single room per scenario, was chosen due to technical limitations and to create an experience impractical on mainstream consoles. The scenario of No Known Survivors was written by Johnston.

Over the nine weeks prior to the game's release, players could open the different episodes using graphics of mutated human limbs. Exploring in the style of a point and click adventure game, the story was split across two episodic stories, told through a combination of audio logs, short animations and written documents found in each environment. The two episodes were "Misplaced Affection", which told of a hiding medical technician remembering his attempted affair with another crewperson; and "13", which focused on a government sleeper agent planted aboard the Ishimura. It began its release on August 25. The final episode of content was released on October 21, alongside the game. Signing up on particular dates unlocked a discount for the game, with the top prize being a reproduction of Isaac's helmet.

== Reception ==
=== Critical reception ===
Reception

Aggregate score
Aggregator	Score
Metacritic	(X360) 89/100 (PS3) 88/100 (PC) 86/100

Review scores
Publication	Score
1Up.com	B+
Computer and Video Games	9.1/10
Eurogamer	7/10
Game Informer	9.25/10
GamePro	5/5
GameSpot	9/10
GameTrailers	8.8/10
IGN	8.7/10
PALGN	9/10

Dead Space received "generally favorable" reviews from critics, according to review aggregator website Metacritic.

Upon release, Dead Space earned universal acclaim from many journalists. Matt Leone of 1Up.com praised its innovations in third-person gameplay, though faulted several elements that felt like padding. Computer and Video Games's Matthew Pellett was similarly positive about the gameplay and lore, though wishing for more zero-G sections and again faulting its length. Dan Whitehead, writing for Eurogamer, enjoyed the experience despite some frustrating design elements and other parts that clashed with the horror aesthetic. Andrew Reiner of Game Informer enjoyed his time with the game, praising its committent to horror elements and gameplay elements. In a second opinion, Joe Juba called it "the premiere accomplishment in survival horror since Resident Evil 4". GamePro gave the game a perfect score, praising almost every aspect of the experience except for a lack of additional gameplay modes.

Lark Anderson of GameSpot praised the enemy design and behavior, praising it as being able to stand out within the survival horror genre. GameTrailers was positive about the game's use of both many horror tropes and its references to other horror and science fiction properties, saying players would be compelled to push on despite the disturbing atmosphere. IGN's Jeff Haynes faulted some overpowered mechanics and frustrating New Game+ elements, but generally praised it as an enjoyable new title in the genre. Jeremy Jastrzab of PALGN summed the game up as "easily the most atmospherically intense, genuinely scary and well-built survival horror experience of this current generation".

The storyline saw a divided reaction; many praised its atmosphere and presentation, but other critics found it derivative or poorly written. Where mentioned, the graphics and environmental design were praised. The voice acting and sound design were also well received, with the latter being praised for reinforcing the horror atmosphere. The twist on combat mechanics and enemy behavior design met with much praise, but repetitive level and mission structure were often faulted. The complete lack of a HUD was also positively noted.

Several retrospective journalistic and website articles have ranked Dead Space as one of the greatest games of all time, pointing out its innovations in the survival horror genre. A 2011 GamePro article noted that the game promoted Electronic Arts as a potential home for original IPs, and generally found a balance between action and horror despite some contemporary reviews having mixed reactions. In an article on the series from 2018, Game Informer said the title stood out for its unique gameplay gimmicks and atmosphere compared to other video games of the time. Magazine Play, in a 2015 feature on the game's production, said that Dead Space distinguished itself by incorporating more action elements into established genre elements, and positively compared its atmosphere to BioShock from 2007 and Metro: Last Light from 2013. In a 2014 article concerning the series' later developments, Kotaku cited it as "one of the best horror games of the seventh generation of consoles".

=== Sales ===
At release, Dead Space reached tenth place in North American game sales, compiled in November by the NPD Group. Recording sales of 193,000 units, it was the only new property to enter the top ten. It was the only Electronic Arts property within that group. In early analysis, low sales of the title were attributed to strong market competition at the time, though sales improved over time due to positive critical reception. By December, the game had sold 421,000 units across all platforms. The game, along with Mirror's Edge, was considered a commercial disappointment following its extensive marketing. Electronic Arts CEO John Riccitiello said that the company would have to lower its expected income for the fiscal year due to multiple commercial disappointments including Dead Space. In February 2009, Electronic Arts CFO Eric Brown confirmed that all versions of Dead Space had sold one million copies worldwide.

=== Awards ===
Year	Award	Category	Result	Ref.
2008	NAVGTR	Camera Direction in a Game Engine	Nominated	
2008	NAVGTR	Animation in a Game Cinema	Won	
2008	NAVGTR	Art Direction in a Game Cinema	Nominated	
2008	NAVGTR	Camera Direction in a Game Engine	Won	
2008	NAVGTR	Direction in a Game Cinema	Nominated	
2008	NAVGTR	Lighting/Texturing	Won	
2008	NAVGTR	Sound Editing in a Game Cinema	Won	
2008	NAVGTR	Sound Effects	Won	
2008	NAVGTR	Use of Sound	Won	
2008	NAVGTR	Game Original Action	Nominated	
2008	Spike Video Game Awards	Best Action Adventure Game	Nominated	
2009
2009	5th British Academy Games Awards	Action & Adventure	Nominated	
2009	5th British Academy Games Awards	Artistic Achievement	Nominated	
2009	5th British Academy Games Awards	Original Score	Won	
2009	5th British Academy Games Awards	Use of Audio	Won	
2009	12th Annual Interactive Achievement Awards	Action Game of the Year	Won	
2009	12th Annual Interactive Achievement Awards	Outstanding Achievement in Art Direction	Nominated	
2009	12th Annual Interactive Achievement Awards	Outstanding Achievement in Original Music Composition	Nominated	
2009	12th Annual Interactive Achievement Awards	Outstanding Achievement in Sound Design	Won	
2009	Annie Awards	Best Animated Video Game	Nominated	
2009	Game Audio Network Guild Awards	Audio of the Year	Won	
2009	Game Audio Network Guild Awards	Music of the Year	Nominated	
2009	Game Audio Network Guild Awards	Sound Design of the Year	Won	
2009	Game Audio Network Guild Awards	Best Use of Multi-Channel Surround in a Game	Nominated	
2009	Game Developers Choice Awards	Audio	Won	

== Legacy ==
=== Sequels ===
Following the success of Dead Space, EA Redwood Shores was restructured as a "genre studio" called Visceral Games, going on to develop several titles alongside their work on the Dead Space franchise, which spawned both further additional media and spin-off titles on several platforms. A direct sequel, Dead Space 2, was released in 2011, and a third title, Dead Space 3, launched in March 2013. The third game was met with disappointing sales, and a prospective sequel was cancelled before Visceral Games was closed down in 2017.

=== Remakes ===
EA announced a remake of Dead Space in July 2021, to be developed by EA's Motive Studios. The remake was released in January 2023 for PC, PlayStation 5, and Xbox Series X/S consoles. Among lead staff include senior producer Philippe Ducharme, creative director Roman Campos-Oriola, and art director Mike Yazijian, all whom had worked on titles within the Dead Space series. There were no plans to change the story or the characters, though the team did consider the other Dead Space games and included references to these prior works as to incorporate the first game better into the series canon. They also incorporated some of the cut content that they found in reviewing the design files for the original game. The team said they would remove some gameplay elements that "didn't work", based on consultation with players and fans of the Dead Space series. They also would focus on improving the accessibility of the game, using improvements in accessibility features created since the original game's release. The remake is built in the Frostbite Engine, rebuilding all the systems from scratch for it and introducing new features such as volumetric and dynamic lighting. The game also takes advantage of the newer consoles' solid-state drive systems to create a seamless experience between levels without any loading screens. There weren't any plans to introduce microtransactions into the game, a similar move following the release of Star Wars Jedi: Fallen Order.

A PlayStation 1-style fan remake, titled Dead Space Demake, was released as a playable demo in April 2023.
