= The Ripper (video game) =

Cancelled video game

- Concept art of Jack the Ripper
- Developer: Visceral Games
- Publisher: Electronic Arts
- Platforms: PlayStation 3, Xbox 360
- Release: Canceled

The Ripper is a canceled downloadable video game created by Visceral Games intended for release on PlayStation 3 and Xbox 360. The game was set in the 19th century and was to have the player assume the role of Jack the Ripper, an unidentified murderer who was active in that time.

== History ==
The Los Angeles Times reported in 2009 that Electronic Arts' Visceral Games studio had the game in development. In 2011 and 2012 then-former Visceral Games artists released some game artwork on their websites, and gaming websites reported that the game had been canceled in 2009.

== Plot ==
The game is a "re-imagining" of Jack the Ripper who instead of murdering prostitutes, will be battling the demons of the night who dwell in the streets of London.
