= Isaac Clarke =

Protagonist of the Dead Space video game series

- Dead Space character
- Isaac Clarke as depicted in promotional material for Dead Space 2 (2011)
- First appearance: Dead Space (2008)
- Created by: Glen Schofield
- Voiced by: Gunner Wright
- Motion capture: Gunner Wright

Isaac Clarke is a character in the survival horror media franchise Dead Space, owned and published by Electronic Arts. He was introduced as the protagonist of Dead Space (2008) developed by EA Redwood Shores, which later became Visceral Games. A starship systems engineer, he is initially contracted by the Concordance Extraction Company (C.E.C) to join the crew of its maintenance ship Kellion on a search and repair mission for USG Ishimura. Once on board the derelict vessel, Isaac finds himself beset by Necromorphs, horrendous undead creatures unleashed by a mysterious alien artifact known as a Marker. Subsequent sequels follow Isaac's struggle to cope with the alteration of his mind by the Marker, as well as his journey to uncover the origin of the Markers and the source of the Necromorph outbreaks.

Named after eminent science fiction writers Isaac Asimov and Arthur C. Clarke, Isaac Clarke is the central character of the main series video games in the Dead Space franchise, which form a trilogy from the titular 2008 video game to 2013's Dead Space 3. Isaac's engineering spacesuit is originally designed around the concept of immersing the player in the character's experiences, with the UI of the video games deliberately integrated behind the suit as part of the developers' diegetic design philosophy. Initially a silent protagonist, Isaac is fully voiced throughout the Dead Space franchise by American actor Gunner Wright, who also provided his likeness and motion capture performance for the character. He has featured in several other video games, from minor easter egg references to fully playable crossover appearances in video games such as PlayStation All-Stars Battle Royale and Fortnite Battle Royale.

Isaac has been received positively, with placements on several top characters lists by video game publications for the best or most popular characters in the video game industry. Both iterations of the character have received positive commentary: an engaging player avatar in the first Dead Space, and a compelling character in his own right as depicted in its sequels and its 2023 remake. The character is also the subject of discussion in academic papers which explore and analyze the series' underlying themes.

== Character development ==
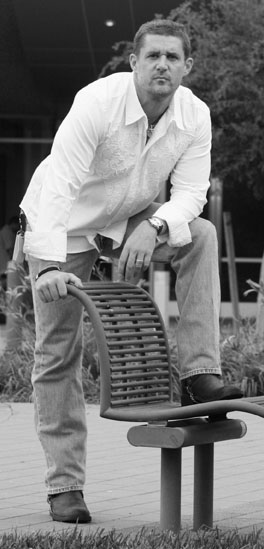
Glen Schofield created the character Isaac Clarke.

Visceral Games, known as EA Redwood Shores prior to its rebranding in 2009, built the first Dead Space using a modified version of the same game engine it used for the Tiger Woods PGA Tour video game series. For its player character, the team envisioned Isaac Clarke as an everyman systems engineer, someone who would be terrified of the horrors he encountered on the Ishimura. Art director Ian Milham emphasized that Isaac is ill-prepared for combat and the suit he wears, though bulky by design, is not designed to help him withstand physicality but to help him lift objects. His relatability was important for the team to manage tension with the player, and to reinforce feelings of vulnerability and the brutality of Isaac's actions when he dismembers his enemies with his mining tools in order to survive. Dead Space creator and executive producer Glen Schofield gave the character a portmanteau name inspired by the science fiction writers Isaac Asimov and Arthur C. Clarke. Schofield has long been inspired by the research Clarke did for his books, and noted that he tries to follow Clarke's example of keeping things "in perspective". Schofield cited one of Clarke's commonly used literary themes, "that man thinks everything revolves around him", as one that resonates with him.

Isaac's engineering suit, known in-universe as a Resource Integration Gear (RIG), is the spacesuit he wears as a playable character in video games. Whenever Isaac takes a significant amount of damage, a glowing bar on the back of his suit would deplete from green in full health, all the way towards red if Isaac dies from his wounds, with the player only seeing parts on his back. The RIG was created out of the necessity to keep the player immersed. A team member was inspired by a personal observation of HUD info displayed on the back of a scuba diver's suit in real life. Dino Ignacio, who served as Visceral Games' lead UI designer, contrasted their design philosophy for Dead Space to that of Mass Effect; all non-diegetic user interface (UI) information was built onto the RIG suit in order to reinforce the immersive experience and avoid cluttering the screen with information like the UI of Mass Effect. Ignacio emphasized that anything which did not belong to Isaac, they were "elegantly placed behind him", such as the health and stasis bars.

Isaac was not originally envisioned to be capable of running as the first game's design team wanted to maintain a measured pace for the character, but negative feedback from focus testers convinced them to relent on their insistence that he should not run in order to conform to what they believed to be a staple trope of survival horror. However, Isaac's running capability had an impact on the effectiveness of enemy artificial intelligence (AI) as they could not react quickly enough to a running character, as the hallways in many levels would not stream fast enough while the player is running, which necessitated numerous design adjustments across the length and breadth of the game's development. A scene which involved Isaac being dragged through a level by a large tentacled Necromorph monster known as the Hive Mind was noted as the most challenging aspect of the game's development.

For Dead Space 3, the developers wanted to emphasize Isaac's background and skills as an engineer by developing a comprehensive weapon crafting and upgrade system. The opening scene from Dead Space 2, where Isaac built an improvised weapon from a flashlight and a surgical tool to fend off an enemy, was used as the reference point for its sequel's crafting system. In retrospect, Ben Wanat, former creative director of the series, felt that the crafting system implemented in Dead Space 3 out of their exuberance to lean into Isaac's technical background undermined the synergy that made the weapons special in its predecessors.

=== Portrayal ===
In the first Dead Space, Isaac is seen outside of his Engineering RIG suit during the prologue section, and does not speak except for grunts and other sounds; his face is also revealed in the game's ending cutscene where he removes his Engineering RIG helmet. This iteration of the character is essentially a cipher for the player to immerse themselves in Isaac's horrific experiences and feel like him. Schofield wanted Isaac to be like Gordon Freeman from Half-Life 2, another silent protagonist who would not talk, but at the same time not coming across as someone who always just takes orders. For Dead Space 2, Visceral Games decided to make Isaac a fully fleshed out character. Dead Space executive producer Steve Papoutsis explained that the decision was born out of the desire to enhance the game's believability as an evolution based around what the story required, and that they were careful and deliberate about when he speaks. Papoutsis explained that while Isaac had no one to converse with for most of the first game, he has more extensive interactions with other non-player characters for its sequel, and that it would make sense for him to vocalize the horrific experiences he had endured. Milham conceded that giving Isaac a voice for Dead Space 2 was a creative risk, but believed that this was necessary as the story of the series going forward required the character to be placed in a more proactive role as a character with agency.

The character's fully voiced iteration and more fleshed out personality in Dead Space 2 allowed the developers to explore the character's deteriorating mental health as part of the gameplay atmosphere and integrate it with the overarching narrative. Visceral's audio director, Andrew Boyd, brought up "Chapter Ten" from Dead Space 2 as an example of how the level's foreboding ambience and music parallels the character's journey into the depths of his own tortured psyche; the early minutes of the level involve Isaac descending numerous elevators, ramps and stairs to reach a section of the disused Ishimura, the setting of the first game. Boyd noted that a jump scare scene, which replicates the sound effects of the Hive Mind ambushing Isaac from the first game and prompts an emotional response from the character, was intended to prompt players to question whether Isaac can trust his own perceptions due to his blurred distinction between reality and imagination as a result of the recurring hallucinations.

American actor Gunner Wright was cast as Isaac Clarke, with the character's in-game model from Dead Space 2 onwards designed to match Wright's facial features. To prepare for the role, Wright was provided with drawings, concept art, back story and notes about the character in addition to the game's script. During the motion capture process, Wright wears a lycra suit and a headband attached with motion capture and recording equipment for his facial expressions and body gestures; he was occasionally shown animated snippets of in-game scenes in between filming takes to provide further context for his performance, which served as the basis for the character's in-game actions. Wright said the role appealed to him, as he liked portraying ordinary and relatable characters who find themselves forced into extreme circumstances. Wright remarked that he is not a gaming enthusiast or gamer himself, though he set a high standard for himself when playing Isaac and took it as seriously as any other acting role. A scene where Isaac locks Ellie into a ship which carried her to safety against her consent resonated with Wright from an acting perspective, which he described as "emotional and pivotal". He remarked that fan feedback on social media towards his portrayal of the character had been positive, and noted that there are gamers who want a deeper story and well written characters for their experiences.

Wright reprised the role of Isaac Clarke for the remake of the first game. The developers wanted to strike a balance between remaining true to the original tone of the game, and giving his personality more depth. In the remake, Isaac can occasionally speak under certain conditions and the character responds with dialogue when spoken to, as well as in instances where it would be awkward if he had remained completely silent.

== Appearances ==
=== Dead Space ===
Isaac Clarke first appears in 2008's Dead Space, where he is introduced as a ship systems engineer assigned by C.E.C (Concordance Extraction Corporation) to the crew of the Kellion, led by Kendra Daniels and Zach Hammond. The Kellion is en route to the USG Ishimura, a large mining ship assigned by C.E.C to perform an illegal strip mining operation on the planet Aegis VII, for a search and rescue missions. He is motivated to participate after receiving a cryptic message from his ex-girlfriend Nicole. Upon a rough landing by the Kellion inside the Ishimura, Isaac takes instructions from Hammond and Kendra to investigate the ship's conditions and perform any necessary repairs, but is separated from the rest of the crew when they are ambushed by Necromorphs. To defend himself and survive, Isaac has to rely on his suit's in-built stasis and telekinetic abilities and adapt his plasma cutter into an improvised weapon, but later gains access to weaponry like pulse rifles and plasma guns.

Isaac eventually encounters Nicole, who tells Isaac that the Marker is the source of the infection on board the Ishimura and convinces him to destroy the Marker, but mysteriously disappears once Isaac acquires and tries to send off the Marker. Daniels later betrays Isaac and reveals that not only is she a double agent secretly instructed by EarthGov to retrieve the Red Marker, but that Nicole had already committed suicide out of desperation and that Isaac has been interacting with an apparition all along. Daniels is killed by the "Hive Mind", a large creature which had been directing the Necromorphs throughout the game, before she could escape with the Marker. After Isaac defeats the Hive Mind, he flees in Daniels' shuttle and allows the Marker to be destroyed along with the colony facility through a sabotage he had initiated earlier in the narrative. En route back to Earth, Isaac deletes his video of Nicole after coming to terms with the truth about her fate. He then experiences a hallucination of being attacked by a reanimated Nicole, showing the influence of the Marker on Isaac is still there and will continue to haunt him for the foreseeable future.

=== Dead Space 2 ===
Three years after the events of the first Dead Space, Isaac is a patient in a mental hospital on the Sprawl, a space station in orbit around what is left of Titan after being mined by humanity. His shuttle, along with the Ishimura, had been recovered by EarthGov and taken to the Sprawl. Along with another survivor, Nolan Stross (the protagonist of Dead Space: Aftermath), they soon learn that they both had alien codes implanted in their brains by their respective contacts with the Markers, and the Sprawl Director, Hans Tiedemann, under direction from EarthGov, has used this information to construct a Marker aboard the Sprawl, which instigates a Necromorph infestation.

Stross is eventually overcome by dementia, forcing Clarke to kill him, but not before learning where Tiedemann's Marker can be found. His hallucinations of Nicole continue, and she further instructs him on how to progress and find the Marker. Clarke eventually defeats Tiedemann and makes contact with the Marker. The Marker mentally tries to have Clarke complete Convergence by linking with his mind, but Clarke fights back to remove the Marker's imprints within his mind. The Marker goes dead, and Clarke escapes with the help of Ellie Langford, a pilot who aided his fight, before the Sprawl explodes.

=== Dead Space 3 ===
Prior to the events of Dead Space 3, Isaac and Ellie had developed a romantic relationship and were living on a colony in Earth's moon. The relationship eventually broke down as Isaac has severe mental distress and trauma due to his prior experiences, with Ellie resolving to leave Isaac as she wants to discover the origin of the Markers and stop the Necromorph scourge once and for all. During the opening sequence of Dead Space 3, Isaac is recruited by two EarthGov soldiers, Capt. Robert Norton and Stg. John Carver, who came looking for him to find Ellie who has gone missing. They are attacked by a faction of Unitologists known as The Circle led by Jacob Arthur Danik, who activates explosives to destroy a local Marker confinement facility and expose its deadly signal, which causes another Necromorph outbreak to occur. Isaac escapes the moon with Norton and his group, and they eventually trace Ellie's coordinates to a series of derelict space vessels orbiting the remote ice planet of Tau Volantis.

They manage to find her ship, the CMS Roanoke, and after a harrowing collision with a debris field, Clarke and the EarthGov soldiers make it aboard. Clarke clears the ship of necromorphs to find Langford and the remains of her crew still alive. They learn that Tau Volantis is the Marker homeworld, and that previous efforts have been made to find a Machine along with a Codex that can control this machine. Traveling to the planet's surface, pursued by Danik and Unitology-aligned soldiers, Clarke, Langford, and Carver discover an alien that contains the Machine, and that the planet's moon is actually a giant necromorph, kept asleep by the transmission of the Machine. By using the Codex, one can turn the Machine off, which will wake the necromorph via the signals sent by the Markers and initiate Convergence, where it will absorb the city and seek others to absorb into itself. Danik manages to deactivate the Machine but is killed as the city is pulled off the planet towards the necromorph. Clarke and Carver reactivate the Machine and deactivate all the Markers, while Langford manages to escape safely.

In the Awakened DLC, both men survived the battle against the Brethren Moon, but discover that the other Brethren Moons are on course to Earth and arrive there just as the planet is being attacked. One of the Moons crashes into their ship, leaving their fates unknown.

=== Other appearances ===
Isaac Clarke was featured in numerous crossover media appearances in other video games. Numerous easter egg references of the character and various elements of the Dead Space games were include in Battlefield Hardline. A full character model for Isaac Clarke is available as a guest character in Tiger Woods PGA Tour 10, NBA Jam: On Fire Edition and Skate 3 as they all share the same game engine as Dead Space, allowing the developers ease of use when importing a single model. In-game cosmetic items themed after the character appeared in some games such as Dragon Age II and the Europe-exclusive "Death Edition" of Dante's Inferno. The character appears as a playable character in the crossover fighting game PlayStation All-Stars Battle Royale, dressed in the arctic suit variant of his RIG armor. On January 23, 2023, to promote the upcoming release of the 2023 remake of Dead Space, Isaac Clarke was added as a cosmetic outfit to Fortnite Battle Royale, sold through the Strange Transmissions Quest Pack along with several other items based on the Dead Space series including his RIG, a mini U.S.G Ishimura back bling, and the plasma saw from Dead Space Downfall. A costume of Isaac Clarke is available to purchase in the 2025 game Skate.

== Cultural impact ==
=== Promotion and merchandise ===
Isaac Clarke has been subject to various merchandise and promotional material. Action figures, figurines and statues of the character were produced as part of the marketing campaigns and licensed tie-ins surrounding Dead Space 2 and Dead Space 3. A live-action trailer starring Gunner Wright as the character was released by Electronic Arts in January 2013 to promote Dead Space 3.

=== Critical reception ===
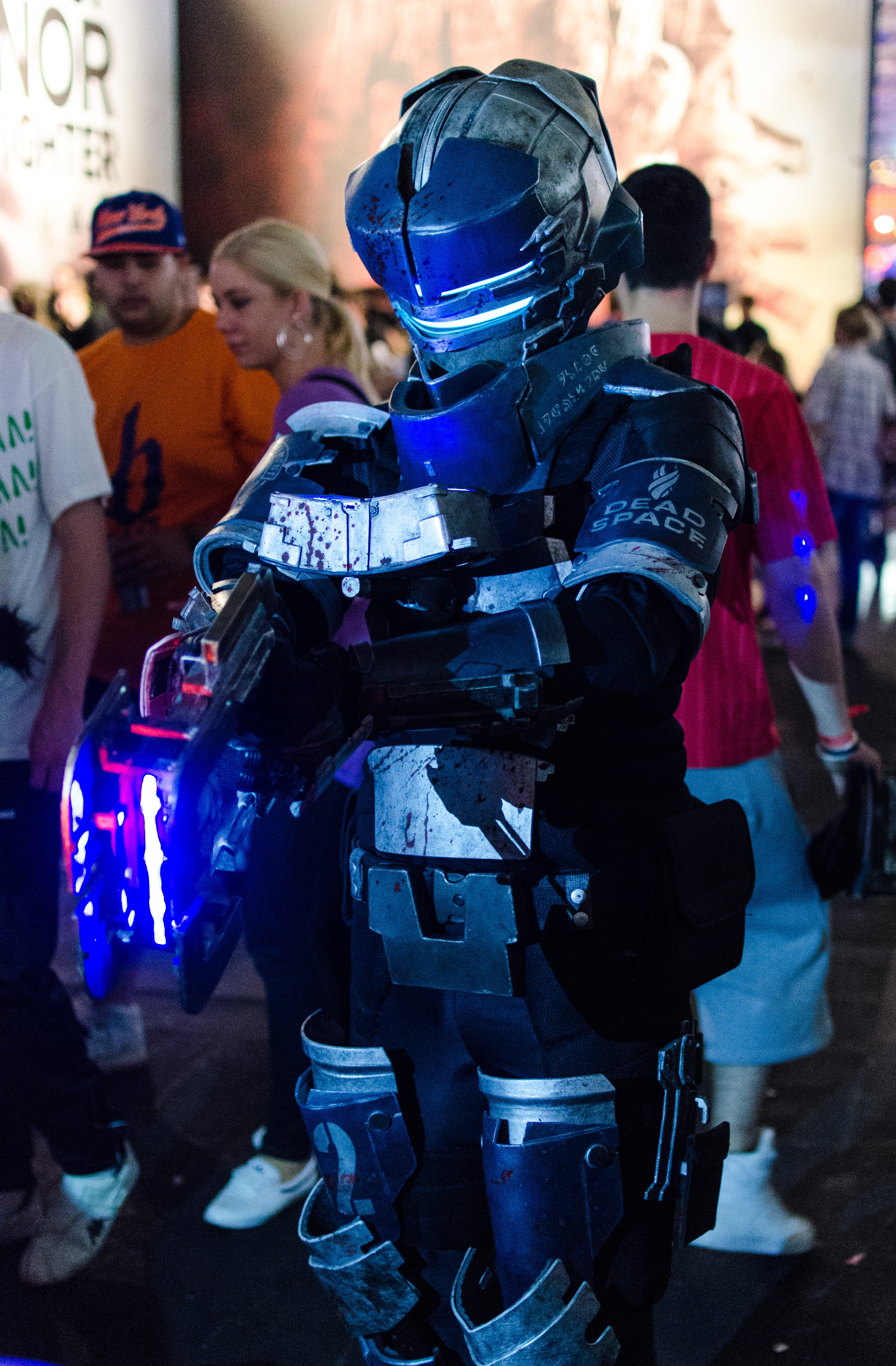
Cosplayer portraying a variant appearance of the character's RIG suit and wielding a Plasma Cutter replica

Several sources described Isaac as a fan favorite, and the character continues to be referenced in popular culture, such as fan art, cosplay and unofficial merchandise.

Isaac has received varied commentary for his depiction throughout the video game series. In an otherwise positive review of the first Dead Space, Zimmerman from Destructoid found the game's cast of characters to be underdeveloped and lacking in personality. For Zimmerman, Isaac in particular was the "most tragic example of unrealized potential", as players know nothing about him except for hints of a history behind his relationship with Nicole, which was teased numerous times throughout the game only to culminate in a "disappointing payoff". Writing for PopMatters, G. Christopher Williams praised Isaac's depiction as a working class hero, who acts out the role of "an intergalactic maintenance man" in a narrative that "finds heroism in doing real work". In retrospective commentary about Dead Space, Graeme Mason from Eurogamer remarked that for many players, including reviewers like himself, Isaac being reduced to a "glorified and mute errand boy in the first game was a huge sticking point".

Isaac's iteration in Dead Space 2 has had a mostly positive reception. Seth Schiesel from The New York Times praised the writers and designers at Visceral for their commendable effort in humanizing Isaac and lending pathos to his narrative, so much so that he reveals himself to be a character deserving of empathy by the end of the story. Henry Gilbert from GamesRadar preferred Isaac's more substantive characterization in Dead Space 2 where he appeared to have his own thoughts and opinions, in contrast to the first game where he seemingly completed tasks from other characters without question. Gilbert enjoyed watching the character grow over the course of the game, from barely getting out of his trauma, to finally finding confidence and a higher purpose outside of being a mere survivor. In this context, Glbert compared Isaac to Ellen Ripley from the Alien franchise, noting the similarities in their character arcs from "scared victim to tough ‘morph killer" in the respective sequels to the originating works where they are the protagonists. Mike Wilson from Bloody Disgusting said Isaac's hallucinations of Nicole as a vehicle of his lingering guilt over her fate, which happened because he pushed her to accept a position on the Ishimura, is "perfect" for conveying psychological horror. On the other hand, Gilbert found the hallucinations a little repetitive by the end of the story. The character's voice acting was also lauded by reviewers like Schiesel and Gilbert, which they found helpful in facilitating a more empathetic connection to the character. Wilson praised Gunnar Wright's portrayal of Isaac, giving players a "more complete character" with emotions and a moral compass. Mason welcomed the decision to give Isaac a voice and some agency over his own destiny, albeit as an emotionally fragile protagonist, noting the cathartic revisit to the Ishimura as a highlight of his narrative.

The character has appeared in numerous character lists. GamesRadar ranked Isaac 22nd on a 2012 list of the best heroes or protagonists in games, 30th in a list of the 50 best game characters of the seventh generation, and several other character lists. Although Clarke ultimately did not make the cut, Game Informer staff considered his inclusion in their "30 characters that defined a decade" feature in 2010, with Ben Reeves lauding his in-universe role in battling the spread of the Necromorphs. Isaac was featured in a 2008 article as one of the characters IGN would like to see in a fighting game, which materialized with the release of a DLC pack for PlayStation All-Stars Battle Royale that adds him as a playable character in 2013. In 2013, Complex ranked Isaac sixteenth on a list of "badass" character in video game history, and the aesthetics of his helmet praised in a list of "The Coolest Helmets and Headgear in Video Games" by UGO Networks.

=== Analysis ===
The character has been the subject of discussion by academic sources. Andrei Nae from the University of Bucharest alleged that Isaac's defeat of the Necromorphs in the first Dead Space represents an ideological implication which reasserts the "superiority of western culture over premodernity and nature", conveyed through the illusion of realism employed by the game and reinforced by the narrativization of the game mechanics that govern the player's control over the playable character. Within this context of underlying colonial discourse, Nae explained that the game depicts a civilizational conflict between Isaac, who represents "the rational enlightened white male", and the monstrous, irrational Necromorphs which represent "the otherness" that must be subdued by Isaac with the assistance of synthetic, man-made means. In her paper which focuses on representations of able bodies and disability within the first Dead Space, Diane Carr analyzed at length the "colourful nature" of Isaac's numerous death scenes, as well as the fragility of his existence and the degree of protection provided by his suit in the face of the Necromorph threat. Carr highlighted that the game's narrative simultaneously engage players, through Isaac as an avatar, visions of abject disability and affirmations of competence.
