= Motive Studio =

Canadian video game developer

- Type: Subsidiary
- Industry: Video games
- Founded: 13 July 2015; 11 years ago
- Founder: Jade Raymond
- Headquarters: Montreal, Canada
- Number of locations: 2 studios (2018)
- Key people: Patrick Klaus (general manager)
- Number of employees: >100 (2017)
- Parent: Electronic Arts
- Website: ea.com/studios/motive

Motive Studio (also known as EA Motive and Motive) is a Canadian video game developer and studio of Electronic Arts (EA) based in Montreal. Motive focuses on action-adventure games and creating new intellectual properties.

== History ==
Motive Studio was founded within Electronic Arts (EA) by Jade Raymond, a former Ubisoft executive and producer, at the helm. Her appointment was announced on 13 July 2015.

Kim Swift was hired as Motive's design director in January 2017. The Montreal studio of BioWare, another EA developer, was merged into Motive in August 2017. A Vancouver branch for Motive was announced in June 2018. Following Raymond's departure in 2018, Patrick Klaus, a former managing director for Ubisoft Quebec, was hired by EA as senior vice-president and Motive's general manager.

While Motive had been working on Star Wars titles from the formation of the studio, the studio also had a second project under the working name Gaia that it had been developing. Motive nor EA had said much of this game outside of a 2020 promotional video showing a few seconds of footage from it, and calling it "a highly ambitious, innovative new game that puts the power and creativity in your hands". According to Bloomberg News, while part of Motive was working on Star Wars Battlefront II, the other portion was working on Gaia; once Battlefront II had shipped, its team was absorbed into the Gaia team by 2018 and caused some cultural clashes within the studio, causing some of the studio executives to leave, followed by Raymond later that year. Gaia had to be rebooted following these departures, extending its development time. Further, according to Bloomberg, as a result of a review of its current slate of projects in February 2021, EA cancelled the development of Gaia, though Motive will continue on with other projects. The first title to be released from the studio was Star Wars: Squadrons.

Venture Beat reported that Motive was working on a revival of the Dead Space series starting with a remake of the first game, in the same vein as the Resident Evil 2 remake. It was released on January 27, 2023 and received favorable reviews from critics.

In September 2022, EA announced that Motive would be working on an action-adventure Iron Man game with Marvel Games. In April 2024, it was also announced that the studio would be contributing to the development of Battlefield 6, the next installment of the Battlefield series, shortly after the closure of Ridgeline Games, who had previously worked on the same project. It was revealed on July 24th, 2025, and released on October 10th, 2025.

== Games developed ==
Year	Title	Platform(s)	Notes	Ref(s).
2017	Star Wars Battlefront II	Windows, PlayStation 4, Xbox One	In collaboration with DICE and Criterion Games	
2020	Star Wars: Squadrons	Windows, PlayStation 4, Xbox One, Xbox Series X/S	—N/a	
2023	Dead Space	Windows, PlayStation 5, Xbox Series X/S	Remake of the 2008 video game of the same name	
2025	Battlefield 6	Windows, PlayStation 5, Xbox Series X/S	In collaboration with DICE, Criterion Games, and Ripple Effect Studios, as part of Battlefield Studios; mainly worked on multiplayer maps and single-player content	
TBA	Marvel's Iron Man	TBA	In collaboration with Marvel Games	

=== Cancelled ===
- Project Ragtag
- Gaia
