= Visceral Games =

American video game developer

- Formerly: EA Redwood Shores (1998–2009)
- Type: Division
- Industry: Video games
- Founded: 1998; 28 years ago
- Defunct: October 17, 2017; 9 years ago
- Headquarters: Redwood City, California, US
- Key people: Scott Probst (general manager); Amy Hennig (creative director)
- Products: PGA Tour series (1999–2006); James Bond series (2001–2005); Dead Space series (2008–2013); Army of Two: The Devil's Cartel (2013); Battlefield Hardline (2015)
- Number of employees: 80 (2017)
- Parent: Electronic Arts

Visceral Games (formerly EA Redwood Shores) was an American video game developer studio owned by Electronic Arts. The studio is best known for creating and principally developing the Dead Space series, and was also involved in making Tiger Woods PGA Tour games between 1999 and 2006.

== History ==
=== EA Redwood Shores (1998–2009) ===
In 1998, Electronic Arts (EA) moved from San Mateo, California to a new corporate headquarters building that it had constructed in Redwood Shores, California. In this move, it founded a studio at this location, named EA Redwood Shores, which operated under the general "EA Games" division.

EA Redwood Shores's initial title was Future Cop: LAPD, released in 1998. Subsequent games through 2008 were generally licensed tie-ins with movies and other properties. According to designers Ben Wanat and Wright Bagwell, EA had not been keen on producing original intellectual property (IP) during this time, but the studio was pursuing an idea of making a second sequel to System Shock and Vice President and General Manager Glen Schofield had been trying to coax EA's executives to let them pursue this. While they had some gameplay and ideas set for this game, the title changed upon the release of Capcom's Resident Evil 4 in 2005, which received high critical praise and commercial success. According to Wanat and Bagwell, not only did Resident Evil 4 alter its ideas for the System Shock game, but it also helped Schofield to convince EA's management to let them pursue a new title. The game became known as Dead Space.

=== Redwood Shores becomes Visceral Games ===
Dead Space was a critical success, leading the studio to be rebranded to Visceral Games in 2009. Along with this, the studio was moved out from EA Games and became its own division under EA, being the first "genre" studio within the company, with the focus of developing third-person action games in the same vein as Dead Space. Alongside the rebranding, two sister studios, Visceral Montreal in Montreal, Quebec alongside EA Montreal, and Visceral Melbourne in Melbourne, Australia, were established.

Alongside its work for Dante's Inferno, inspired by the Divine Comedy, Visceral had announced plans in 2009 for a title called The Ripper, which was inspired by Jack the Ripper. The Ripper was confirmed to have been cancelled, potentially as early as 2009, but industry rumors suggested that a spin-out of that title Blood Dust had been at work at the Visceral Melbourne studio before the project was cancelled. The Visceral Melbourne studio was closed down on September 19, 2011.

On its release in 2010, Dante's Inferno received mixed reviews, and the studio subsequently returned to Dead Space with its sequel Dead Space 2, released in 2011. The sequel has similar critical success, but in 2017, it was revealed that the game was considered a financial disappointment with EA; following the studio's closure, former level design Zach Wilson estimated that with development costs around $47M and an equivalent marketing budget, EA did not recoup enough costs on 4 million sales.

Visceral continued working on the next title, Dead Space 3, which they wanted to make in the same vein as the first title, but according to Wanat, there was concern from EA about this approach, and among other large changes, had the team introduce co-operative play into the game. Wanat described that there was pressure to make the game play faster and appeal to a broader audience, an approach that was at odds with the roots of the series in the horror genre. Though the game still had generally positive reviews on its release in 2013, it sold far less than Dead Space 2. EA's VP Patrick Söderlund said in a July 2013 interview, following Dead Space 3's that while they still valued the franchise, Visceral was not working on a fourth title, and instead had been assigned to two new projects.

Visceral had also been developing Army of Two: The Devil's Cartel with the Visceral Montreal studio. Upon its completion, EA let go of the whole of Visceral Montreal on February 21, 2013. One of the two projects that Visceral started working on in 2013 was Battlefield Hardline, a "Cops and Robbers" variation on the previous Battlefield games. A smaller team then started working on a project called Jamaica, a pirate-themed game.

=== Final years ===
In early 2013, Disney had acquired Lucasfilm and shut down its game development studio LucasArts. EA quickly made a deal to help develop lucrative Star Wars games through three of its studios, including Visceral. Furthermore, Ubisoft had announced Assassin's Creed IV: Black Flag, which also was based on a pirate theme. EA cancelled the Jamaica project in favor of a Star Wars game. The studio opted to pitch a third-person action game that maintained the spirit of Jamaica, having players play as "space scoundrels" in an open-world-style Star Wars universe, and code-named this project Yuma. Amy Hennig, the writer for the first three Uncharted games from Naughty Dog, was brought into EA for Visceral as creative lead and to help write the story for Yuma. The concept was later changed, making it about a large-scale heist and renaming it Ragtag.

EA made the decision to close down Visceral on October 17, 2017. EA reassigned the Star Wars game to its EA Worldwide Studios, led by EA Vancouver, and said they will revamp the gameplay. The closure of Visceral was seen as a sign of the waning interest in publishers in making games that are strictly single player, as many of Visceral's games had been. In light of these concerns, EA's CEO Andrew Wilson stated that the reason for Visceral's closure wasn't a single-player versus multiplayer game issue, but instead one based on listening to player feedback and following marketplace trends. The company felt that the current design of Ragtag wasn't fitting these changes and that the closure of Visceral and reassignment to another studio was because "we needed to pivot the design".

== Games ==
Year	Game	Platform(s)
as EA Redwood Shores
1998	Future Cop: LAPD	Mac OS, Microsoft Windows, PlayStation
1999	CyberTiger	PlayStation
1999	Tiger Woods PGA Tour 2000	PlayStation
2000	NASCAR Rumble	PlayStation
2000	Road Rash: Jailbreak	PlayStation
2000	F1 Championship Season 2000	PlayStation 2
2001	Tiger Woods PGA Tour 2001	PlayStation 2
2001	Rumble Racing	PlayStation 2
2001	James Bond 007: Agent Under Fire	GameCube, PlayStation 2, Xbox
2002	Tiger Woods PGA Tour 2002	PlayStation 2
2002	Freekstyle	PlayStation 2, GameCube
2002	Tiger Woods PGA Tour 2003	GameCube, PlayStation 2, Xbox
2003	Tiger Woods PGA Tour 2004	GameCube, PlayStation 2, Xbox
2003	The Lord of the Rings: The Return of the King	Microsoft Windows, PlayStation 2, GameCube, Xbox
2004	James Bond 007: Everything or Nothing	GameCube, PlayStation 2, Xbox
2004	Tiger Woods PGA Tour 2005	GameCube, PlayStation 2, Xbox
2004	The Lord of the Rings: The Third Age	GameCube, PlayStation 2, Xbox
2005	Tiger Woods PGA Tour 06	GameCube, PlayStation 2, Xbox, Xbox 360
2005	James Bond 007: From Russia with Love	GameCube, PlayStation 2, Xbox, PlayStation Portable
2006	The Godfather	Microsoft Windows, PlayStation 2, Xbox, PlayStation Portable, Xbox 360, PlayStation 3, Wii
2006	Tiger Woods PGA Tour 07	Microsoft Windows, PlayStation 2, Xbox, Xbox 360, PlayStation 3, Wii
2007	The Sims 2: Pets	GameCube, PlayStation 2, PlayStation Portable, Wii
2007	MySims	Wii, Microsoft Windows
2007	The Sims 2: Castaway	Wii, PlayStation 2, PlayStation Portable
2007	The Simpsons Game	PlayStation 2, PlayStation 3, PlayStation Portable, Wii, Xbox 360
2008	The Sims Carnival: Snap City	Microsoft Windows
2008	The Sims 2: Apartment Life	Microsoft Windows
2008	Dead Space	Microsoft Windows, PlayStation 3, Xbox 360
2008	MySims Kingdom	Wii
2009	MySims Party	Wii
2009	The Godfather II	Microsoft Windows, PlayStation 3, Xbox 360
as Visceral Games
2009	Dead Space: Extraction	PlayStation 3, Wii
2009	MySims Agents	Wii
2010	Dante's Inferno	PlayStation 3, Xbox 360
2010	The Sims 3: Ambitions	Microsoft Windows, OS X
2011	Dead Space 2	Microsoft Windows, PlayStation 3, Xbox 360
2013	Dead Space 3	Microsoft Windows, PlayStation 3, Xbox 360
2013	Battlefield 3: End Game	Microsoft Windows, PlayStation 3, Xbox 360
2013	Army of Two: The Devil's Cartel	PlayStation 3, Xbox 360
2015	Battlefield Hardline	Microsoft Windows, PlayStation 3, PlayStation 4, Xbox 360, Xbox One
Cancelled	The Ripper	PlayStation 3, Xbox 360
Cancelled	Blood Dust	PlayStation 3, Xbox 360
Cancelled	Dante's Purgatory	Likely PlayStation 3, Xbox 360
Cancelled	"Project Ragtag" - unnamed Star Wars title	Microsoft Windows, PlayStation 4, Xbox One
