= Dante's Inferno (2007 film) =

- Theatrical release poster
- Directed by: Sean Meredith
- Written by: Dante Alighieri (novel); Sandow Birk; Sean Meredith; Paul Zaloom
- Produced by: Sean Meredith; Paul Zaloom; Sandow Birk
- Starring: Dermot Mulroney; James Cromwell; Paul Zaloom; Andy Daly; Martha Plimpton; Tony Hale; Scott Adsit; Janet Varney
- Cinematography: Michael Negrin
- Edited by: Sean Meredith
- Music by: Mark McAdam
- Distributed by: Dante Film LLC
- Release date: January 2007
- Running time: 78 minutes
- Country: United States
- Language: English

Dante's Inferno is a 2007 comedy film performed with hand-drawn paper puppets on a theater stage. The film was adapted from the book "Dante's Inferno" by Sandow Birk and Marcus Sanders (Chronicle Books, 2004), a modern update of the canticle Inferno from Dante Alighieri's epic poem Divine Comedy. The film chronicles Dante's (voiced by Dermot Mulroney) journeys through the underworld, guided by Virgil (voiced by James Cromwell). The head puppeteer was Paul Zaloom and the puppets were designed by Elyse Pignolet and drawn by Sandow Birk. The film premiered January 20, 2007 at the 2007 Slamdance Film Festival. The film has also been shown at the Santa Barbara International Film Festival, Sarasota Film Festival, Atlanta Film Festival, Newport Beach Film Festival, Maryland Film Festival, Silver Lake Film Festival, the Boston Underground Film Festival, and on the Ovation TV cable network.

== Plot ==
The film opens with a theater stage and Dante Alighieri waking up in a stupor. With little memory of where he is, he finds Virgil, an old man in a bathrobe, who identifies himself; shows Dante an image of Beatrice, his dead lover; and guides him to the gates of hell.

After passing the street sign which reads "Abandon all hope on entry here," Virgil shows Dante those in Limbo (for they never chose a side in life) forced to forever protest at a harbor. They meet Charon and, after an earthquake and crossing the Acheron, enter the first circle— for those whose vice was not being Christians— who have no punishment but separation from God. Virgil introduces Dante to the poets and describes the liberation of famous Old Testament figures from hell.

Continuing, they witness King Minos judging sinners. In the second circle, they see the lustful being forced to eternally have sex. After hearing the story of Francesca and Paulo, Dante passes out. He wakes up in the third circle, a construction zone full of trash; after Virgil shoots Cerberus, they see the gluttonous who are forced to eternally eat. In the fourth circle lies the greedy, with obscured identities, forced to push a car in a circle.

Reaching the river Styx, Dante and Virgil cross it via a taxi boat; in the river fight the souls of the wrathful. Reaching the City of Dis, a suburban "planned community," Virgil convinces the occupants to let him and Dante in. The two visit the sixth circle where heretics burn in Jacuzzis. Dante, recognizing his old landlord, Farinata, explains the souls ability to vaguely see past and future. After encountering a terrible stench, Virgil advises them to take a break. While resting, he explains the next three circles of violence, fraud, and treachery as mugshots of various historical figures in those circles cycle on the screen.

After going to the Minotaur's Greek food stand, Dante and Virgil meet Chiron and other centaurs in police uniforms who they pay to get a ride by the Phlegethon, a flaming river with those who committed violence against others. Going farther, the two enter a park full of those who committed suicide whose souls are trapped in trees. Continuing, they enter The White Swallow, where Dante finds Mr. Latini, his teacher, who shows him those in this ring are forced to continuously dance.

Meeting a giant hole, Dante and Virgil descend on a Fox News helicopter. After getting kicked out of the plane by Virgil, Dante sees the seducers (pimps) and the two get a ride with demon-pimp Celia. At Capitol Hill, home of the flatterers, they hear musical number which condemns lobbyists. Farther down, Dante enters the church of the simonist, those who abused their religious positions. Next, the diviners are stuck with their heads twisted around. Celia drops of Dante and Virgil at an airport where barrators are punished. After Spiro Agnew is beat by the TSA for taking bribes, Virgil and Dante, chased, run and jump off of a jet bridge where they meet the hypocrites in mascot costumes. Farther, Dante is almost deceived by the identity thieves who are only able to assume the identities of others but leaves shortly. In a puppet show, Ulysses tells his story in which he abandoned his family and convinced his crew to "civilize" the rest of the world; the weight of the loot eventually causing his crew to drown. Outside, a Muslim taxi-driver berates Dante and Virgil; they are punished by being split in two. In a skyscraper are the falsifiers; going down an elevator, they witness the ironic torturing of money launderers, asset-inflaters, and insider-traders.

Taking the subway to Cocytus, a frozen city, they ice-skate. Meeting Dick Cheney, he tells how a demon possesses his body on Earth. At hell's center, Satan, a human in red body paint, is eating Judas, Brutus, and Heinrich Himmler. Nearly being killed, Dante escapes through Satan's behind and leaves the underworld.

== Voice cast ==
- Tony Abatemacro - Lying Defendant, Farinata
- Scott Adsit - Judge Minos, Paolo, Hirohito, Spiro Agnew
- Matt Besser - Metallica Defendant, L. Ron Hubbard, Curtis LeMay,
- Bill Chott - Ciaccio 'El Gordo', Calvacanti, Joseph Stalin, Ulysses' Crew
- Mike Coleman - Charon, Phlegyas, Senator, Dick Cheney
- James Cromwell - Virgil
- Andrew Daly - Lucan, "Right On" Glutton, Jim Jones, Airport Screener, Ulysses' Naysayer
- John Fleck - Brunetto Latini
- Sean Forrester - Horace, Filippo Argenti, White Pimp, Beating Victim, Airport Security, Insider Trader #2
- Tony Hale - Ovid, Real Estate Broker, Pope Nicholas III
- Tom Hallick - George Sanders, Deep Voiced Lobbyist
- Brandon Johnson - Irate Driver, Mounted Policeman, Pimp #1, Pimp #3, Airport Security
- Laura Krafft - George Sand, Airport P.A., Subway P.A.
- Dermot Mulroney - Dante
- Martha Plimpton - Celia, Lobbyist Singer, Lizzie Borden
- Kit Pongetti - W.M.D. Defendant, Francesca, Marilyn Monroe, Elena Ceaușescu
- Tami Sagher - George Eliot, Greed Seductress, Barbara Bates, Penelope
- Dana Snyder - Strom Thurmond, Ulysses
- Janet Varney - Teacher, Cleopatra, City of Dis Intercom, Ulysses' Usher
- Matt Walsh - Benito Mussolini, Fox Reporter, Airport Security Pursuer
- Paul Zaloom - Homer, God, Officer Chiron, Southern Lobbyist, Airport Security, Caiaphas, Ulysses' Crew, Mahmoud, Insider Trader #1, Nicolae Ceaușescu
- Mark Ritts - Gianciotto or Giovanni Malatesta

== Characters ==
The two main characters of Dante's Inferno are Dante Alighieri and Virgil. Mentioned before their entering to hell is Ralph, a friend of Dante whom he calls after exiting hell, and Beatrice, Dante's dead lover. God is additionally a character portrayed in the Harrowing of Hell scene. The following is an incomplete list of characters ordered quasi-chronologically in the film and where in hell they reside:

Character	Circle	Subsection	Sin	Notes
Charon	Limbo	Limbo	—	Charon is the ferryman over the Acheron river
Ovid	1st		Born before Christ	
Horace	1st		Born before Christ	
Homer	1st		Born before Christ	
George Sand	1st		Born before Christ	
George Eliot	1st		Born before Christ	
Abel	1st		Born before Christ	Previously in the 1st circle; ascended to heaven during the Harrowing of Hell
Noah	1st		Born before Christ	Previously in the 1st circle; ascended to heaven during the Harrowing of Hell
Moses	1st		Born before Christ	Previously in the 1st circle; ascended to heaven during the Harrowing of Hell
Samuel	1st		Born before Christ	Previously in the 1st circle; ascended to heaven during the Harrowing of Hell
King Minos	2nd		—	At the entrance of the 2nd circle; determines entering sinners punishment
Cleopatra	2nd		Lust	
Helen of Troy	2nd		Lust	
Fatty Arbuckle	2nd		Lust	
John F. Kennedy	2nd		Lust	
Paul Gauguin	2nd		Lust	
Francesca	2nd		Lust	Is having sex with Paulo
Paulo	2nd		Lust	Is having sex with Francesca
Cerberus	3rd		Gluttony	Three-headed guard dog who lives in the 3rd circle
El Gordo	3rd		Gluttony	Referred to as "Ciacco" in the Inferno
Mr. Argenti	5th		Wrath	Dante's swim coach; he is in the river Styx
Farinata	6th		Heresy	Dante's landlord
L. Ron Hubbard	6th		Heresy	
Jim Jones	6th		Heresy	
Billy Sunday	6th		Heresy	
Father Divine	6th		Heresy	
Ruhollah Kohmonei	6th		Heresy	
John O' Connor	6th		Heresy	
Minotaur	7th		—	Right outside the 6th circle, the Minotaur runs a Greek food stand
Chiron	7th		—	Head of the other police officer centaurs; punishes the sinners of this circle
Vasco Nunez de Balboa	7th	1st	Stealing	Featured in a slideshow of headshots and not pictured elsewhere
Hernando de Soto	7th	1st	Destruction of property	Featured in a slideshow of headshots and not pictured elsewhere
Boss Tweed	7th	1st	Extortion	Featured in a slideshow of headshots and not pictured elsewhere
J.P. Morgan	7th	1st	Robbery	Featured in a slideshow of headshots and not pictured elsewhere
Attila the Hun	7th	1st	Rape	Featured in a slideshow of headshots and not pictured elsewhere
John Wilkes Booth	7th	1st	Murder	Featured in a slideshow of headshots and not pictured elsewhere
Joseph Stalin	7th	1st	Warmongering	Found in the flaming river, Phlegethon
Curtis LeMay	7th	1st	Warmongering	Found in the flaming river, Phlegethon
Benito Mussolini	7th	1st	Warmongering	Found in the flaming river, Phlegethon
Hirohito	7th	1st	Warmongering	Found in the flaming river, Phlegethon
George Sanders	7th	2nd	Suicide	
Barbara Bates	7th	2nd	Suicide	
Marilyn Monroe	7th	2nd	Suicide	
Hermann Goering	7th	2nd	Suicide	
Kaiser Wilhelm	7th	2nd	Wasted personal property	Featured in a slideshow of headshots and not pictured elsewhere
King Farouk	7th	2nd	Gambling and whoredom	Featured in a slideshow of headshots and not pictured elsewhere
Dean Martin	7th	2nd	Drunkenness	Featured in a slideshow of headshots and not pictured elsewhere
Pol Pot	7th	3rd	General violence against God	Featured in a slideshow of headshots and not pictured elsewhere
Robert Moses	7th	3rd	Going against nature	Featured in a slideshow of headshots and not pictured elsewhere
Lyndon B. Johnson	7th	3rd	Cursing	Featured in a slideshow of headshots and not pictured elsewhere
Marge Schott	7th	3rd	Swearing	Featured in a slideshow of headshots and not pictured elsewhere
Friedrich Nietzsche	7th	3rd	Blasphemy	Featured in a slideshow of headshots and not pictured elsewhere
Brunetto Latini	7th	3rd	Sodomy and homosexuality	Mr. Latini, as he is referred to as, is Dante's teacher, Brunetto Latini, who states that he is in hell due to "sodomy" laws and "Christian values;" he heavily applies he is non-heterosexual and dons a rainbow headband.
Roy Cohn	7th	3rd	Heavily implied sexual acts against nature e.g. homosexuality	Brunetto Latini points out these sinners as currently dancing in The White Swallow. Additionally listed is "a bunch of fun guys from the Diocese of Boston."
Joseph McCarthy	7th	3rd	Heavily implied sexual acts against nature e.g. homosexuality	Brunetto Latini points out these sinners as currently dancing in The White Swallow. Additionally listed is "a bunch of fun guys from the Diocese of Boston."
J. Edgar Hoover	7th	3rd	Heavily implied sexual acts against nature e.g. homosexuality	Brunetto Latini points out these sinners as currently dancing in The White Swallow. Additionally listed is "a bunch of fun guys from the Diocese of Boston."
Clyde Tolson	7th	3rd	Heavily implied sexual acts against nature e.g. homosexuality	Brunetto Latini points out these sinners as currently dancing in The White Swallow. Additionally listed is "a bunch of fun guys from the Diocese of Boston."
Liberace	7th	3rd	Heavily implied sexual acts against nature e.g. homosexuality	Brunetto Latini points out these sinners as currently dancing in The White Swallow. Additionally listed is "a bunch of fun guys from the Diocese of Boston."
Andrew Cunanan	7th	3rd	Heavily implied sexual acts against nature e.g. homosexuality	Brunetto Latini points out these sinners as currently dancing in The White Swallow. Additionally listed is "a bunch of fun guys from the Diocese of Boston."
Ernst Röhm	7th	3rd	Heavily implied sexual acts against nature e.g. homosexuality	Brunetto Latini points out these sinners as currently dancing in The White Swallow. Additionally listed is "a bunch of fun guys from the Diocese of Boston."
Greyon [sic]	7th		—	Greyon, analogous to Geryon, is a Fox News helicopter
Richard M. Nixon	8th		Crookery	Featured in a slideshow of headshots and not pictured elsewhere
Tokyo Rose	8th		Lying	Featured in a slideshow of headshots and not pictured elsewhere
Lee Atwater	8th		Conning	Featured in a slideshow of headshots and not pictured elsewhere
Al Capone	8th		Tax Evasion	Featured in a slideshow of headshots and not pictured elsewhere
Peter Lawford	8th		Pimpdom and flattery	Featured in a slideshow of headshots and not pictured elsewhere
Richard Helms	8th		Drug dealing	Featured in a slideshow of headshots and not pictured elsewhere
Leni Riefenstahi	8th		Grifting	Featured in a slideshow of headshots and not pictured elsewhere
Billy Carter	8th		Freeloading	Featured in a slideshow of headshots and not pictured elsewhere
F. Lee Bailey	8th		Ambulance chasing	Featured in a slideshow of headshots and not pictured elsewhere
Francisco Franco	8th		Being a "plain old prick"	Featured in a slideshow of headshots and not pictured elsewhere
Celia	8th	1st	—	A "demon pimp" who gives Dante and Virgil a ride in her convertible
Statue of Freedom	8th	2nd	—	Unnamed; begins the musical number of the lobbyists
Nicholas III	8th	3rd	Simony and abuse of church positions	
Alexander VI	8th	3rd	Simony and abuse of church positions	
John XII	8th	3rd	Simony and abuse of church positions	
Boniface VIII	8th	3rd	Simony and abuse of church positions	
Ronald Reagan	8th	4th	Consulting astrologists	
Adolf Hitler	8th	4th	Consulting astrologists	Dante reports his shock that Hitler is in hell for astrology and not genocide
Spiro Agnew	8th	5th	Barratry	
Strom Thurmond	8th	6th	Hypocrisy	
Caiaphas	8th	6th	Hypocrisy	Caiaphas is wearing a Barney costume and is being crucified, singing "I love you, you love me" repeatedly.
Ulysses	8th	8th	Persuading his men to sin	Ulysses performs a puppet show that explains how he led his men astray after the Trojan War and on a global conquest of looting and murdering, eventually drowning with his men from the weight of the loot
Mahmoud	8th	8th	Being Muslim	He complains and berates Dante regarding his sentencing in Hell, islamophobia (especially regarding the September 11 attacks), and his portrayal in the movie as a taxi-driver.
Abdul	8th	8th	Being Muslim	Brother-in-law of Mahmoud
John Gotti	9th	1st	Fraud against family	Featured in a slideshow of headshots and not pictured elsewhere
Charles Ponzi	9th	1st	Fraud against friends	Featured in a slideshow of headshots and not pictured elsewhere
Henri-Philippe Petain	9th	2nd	Fraud against country	Featured in a slideshow of headshots and not pictured elsewhere
John Wayne Gacy	9th	3rd	Fraud against hospitality	Featured in a slideshow of headshots and not pictured elsewhere
Herff Applewhite	9th	—	Treachery	Featured in a slideshow of headshots and not pictured elsewhere
Nathuran Godse [sic]	9th	—	Treachery	Featured in a slideshow of headshots and not pictured elsewhere
Lizzie Borden	9th		Treachery against kin	
Nicolae Ceausescu	9th		Treachery against country	
Elena Ceausescu	9th		Treachery against country	
Quisling	9th		Treachery	
Ugolino	9th		Treachery against country	Ugolino is chewing on the ear of Ruggieri, who is portrayed yet unnamed
Dick Cheney	9th		Treachery	Cheney was still vice president when the film released; similar to Fra Alberigo in the Inferno, he was "so evil" that his soul went to hell before his death, his body being possessed by a demon
Satan	Center of Hell	Center of Hell	Treachery	Satan is at the center of hell, gnawing on the three following sinners: Judas, Brutus, and Heinrich Himmler
Judas Iscariot	Center of Hell	Center of Hell	Treachery	
Brutus	Center of Hell	Center of Hell	Treachery	
Heinrich Himmler	Center of Hell	Center of Hell	Treachery	
Pope John Paul II	—	—	—	In a repeated visual gag, John Paul II appears rolling around in a wheelchair, confused why he is not in heaven

== Reception ==
Film critic Curt Holman gave the film 3 stars and said it had a "far-ranging and bawdy satirical spirit." Film critic Kevin Stewart said "such political satire is very fitting for the manner and the times."

"There’s enough of the divinely comic in this 'Inferno' to justify a pair of sequels" -Peter Keough, Boston Phoenix, March 2007

"...feels like the unholy offspring of Mike Judge and R. Crumb." – Robert Abele, LA Times, May 2007

Director Sean Meredith won the "Best Director" award at the Silver Lake Film Festival in Los Angeles in 2007, and the film won the "Audience Favorite" award at the San Francisco IndieFest in 2007. Boston Underground Film Festival gave it the Spirit of Underground award in 2007. The jury at the 2007 Lausanne Underground Film and Music Festival gave the award for Best Narrative Feature.
