= Dante's Inferno: An Animated Epic =

2010 American anthology film by several directors

- Directed by: Mike Disa; Shūkō Murase; Yasuomi Umetsu; Victor Cook; Jong-Sik Nam; Kim Sang-jin; Lee Seung-Gyu
- Written by: Brandon Auman
- Based on: Divine Comedy; by Dante Alighieri and; Dante's Inferno; by Visceral Games
- Produced by: Cho Yongjoo; Joe Goyette; Chung Hyun; Mitsuhisa Ishikawa
- Starring: Graham McTavish; Vanessa Branch; Peter Jessop; Steve Blum
- Music by: Christopher Tin
- Production companies: Starz Media; Film Roman; Electronic Arts; Visceral Games; Production I.G; Dong Woo Animation; Manglobe; JM Animation; MOI Animation; Digital eMation; BigStar
- Distributed by: Anchor Bay Entertainment; Manga Entertainment
- Release date: February 9, 2010
- Running time: 88 minutes
- Countries: United States; Japan; South Korea; Singapore
- Languages: English; Japanese

Dante's Inferno: An Animated Epic is a 2010 American adult animated dark fantasy film. Based on the Dante's Inferno video game that was itself loosely based on Dante's poem of the same name, the film is an anthology film that depicts the titular character traveling through Hell. It was released on February 9, 2010.

== Plot ==
Returning from the Third Crusade, Dante arrives home to find his servants slain, his father dead and his beloved fiancée Beatrice dying of a stab wound to the stomach. As she dies, Lucifer plucks Beatrice into the gates of Hell and Dante gives chase. Virgil appears and offers to guide him through Hell. They board Charon, a demonic, living ferry that takes souls to the First Circle of Hell. Charon commands demons to attack Dante, as no living being is allowed to enter. Dante fights them off, kills Charon, and steers him into the first circle, Limbo.

In Limbo, Dante learns Beatrice was pregnant with his child while he was away, but miscarried. Attacked by demonic children, he and Virgil escape into a large building; they enter a hall of great rulers, philosophers, and thinkers. Moving on, they battle King Minos, whose task is to send condemned souls to their sin's corresponding circle of Hell.

In the second circle, Lust, Dante battles lust minions and is reminded that he was once unfaithful to Beatrice. Upon hearing this, Beatrice begins to lose faith in Dante.

The pair come to a grotto where men and women who had lived their lives in gluttony are devoured by Cerberus, the great hound of Hell. Virgil tells Dante that the only way to the next circle is from within the beast, so Dante allows himself to be eaten. He encounters Ciacco, a man from his village, who confesses to gluttony; Dante tells him to be free and blesses him with his cross. Dante attacks and destroys the hound's heart to escape.

In the fourth circle, Greed, Dante confronts his father Alighiero di Bellincione. The pair trade barbs with each other and Dante kicks his father into a vat of boiling gold.

In the fifth circle, Wrath (shown as Anger in the movie in a subtitle and spoken by Virgil), Dante recognizes Filippo Argenti who taunts him, only to be brought down by other wrathful spirits. Dante sees Lucifer in the city of Dis; he announces to the city's damned souls his intent to marry Beatrice.

In the sixth circle of Heretics, forever burn in fire and are tortured. Dante meets and kills his rival Farinata and overcomes the Minotaur.

Upon entering Violence and given passage through the Phlegethon by Nessus, Dante descends into the Forest of Suicides upon hearing a familiar cry, soon finding his mother growing from the sapling of a tree. Believing that she had died of a fever, Dante is overwhelmed with sorrow; he uses his cross to free her soul. Afterwards, he has to fight his brother-in-law, Francesco, who has been sent to hell for his participation in the Crusades.

In the realm of Fraud, Dante begins to reflect upon his own sins and realizes that he inadvertently caused the death of all his loved ones by angering the husband of the woman he slept with during the Crusades. Beatrice weds Lucifer and becomes a demon. She attacks Dante, forcing him to look into the ninth circle of Treachery, where he sees his greatest sin: allowing her brother to take the blame for his slaughter of the heretic prisoners. Overwhelmed with grief, he gives Beatrice her cross and pleads with her to accept the love of God. She forgives him and promises that they will be together soon as an angel of the Lord takes her from Hell, but in order to escape Hell, he will need to face Lucifer alone. Before doing so, he parts ways with Virgil.

In the ninth circle, he learns the location of Lucifer from one of the souls. And as the two battle each other, Lucifer attempts to escape to a chasm to Purgatory. Dante realizes that he cannot stop Lucifer on his own; he begs for divine forgiveness. Lucifer tries to stop him, but an explosive beam of light emanates from Dante, and Lucifer is frozen solid.

In the final scene, Dante dives into the chasm that leads through the earth to Purgatory to be with Beatrice, now "neither completely living, nor completely dead". He rips off his tapestry, which then disintegrates and transforms into the Hebrew serpent, slithering away, as Lucifer laughs, implying that he is biding his time for revenge.

== Cast ==
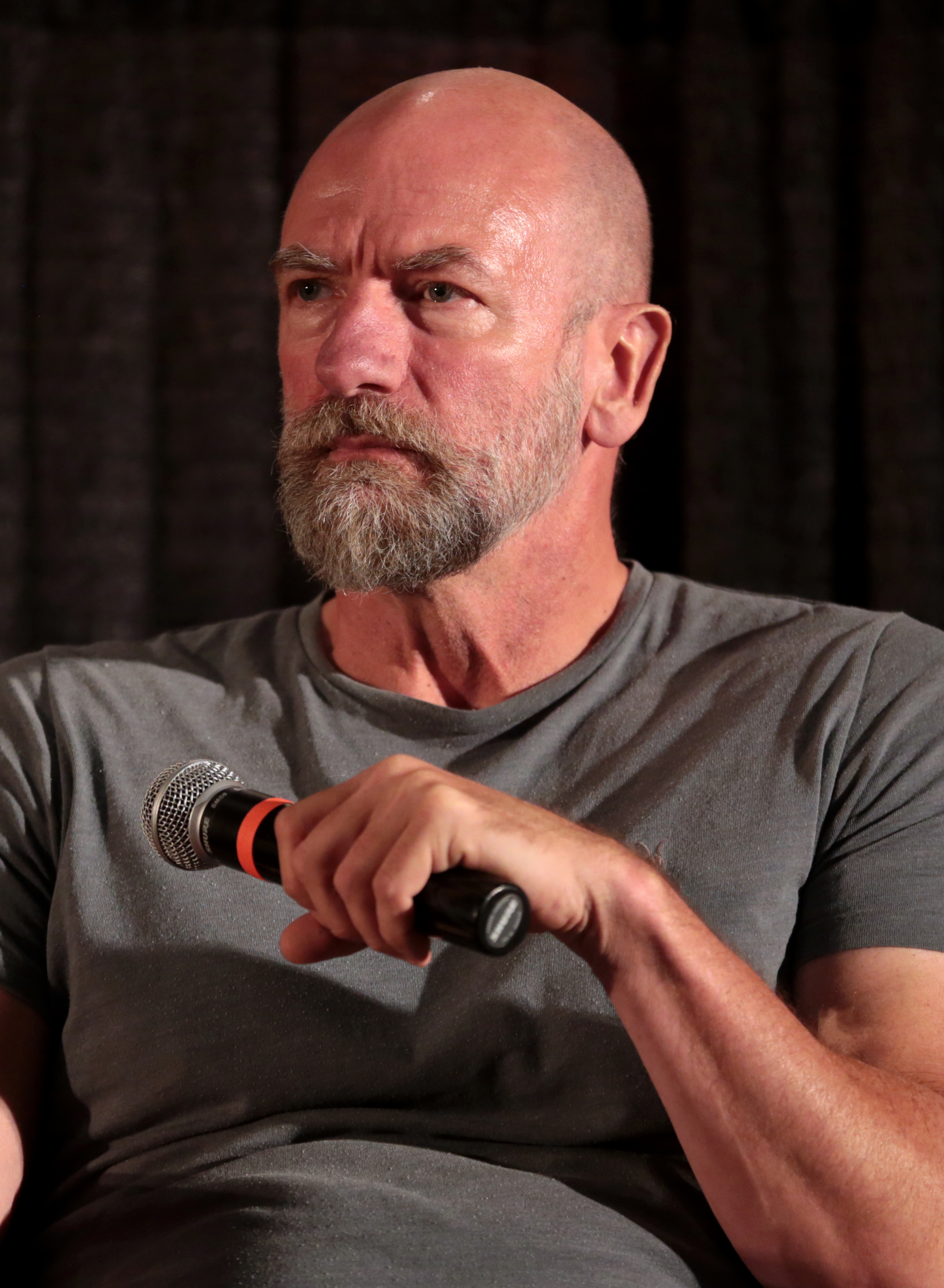
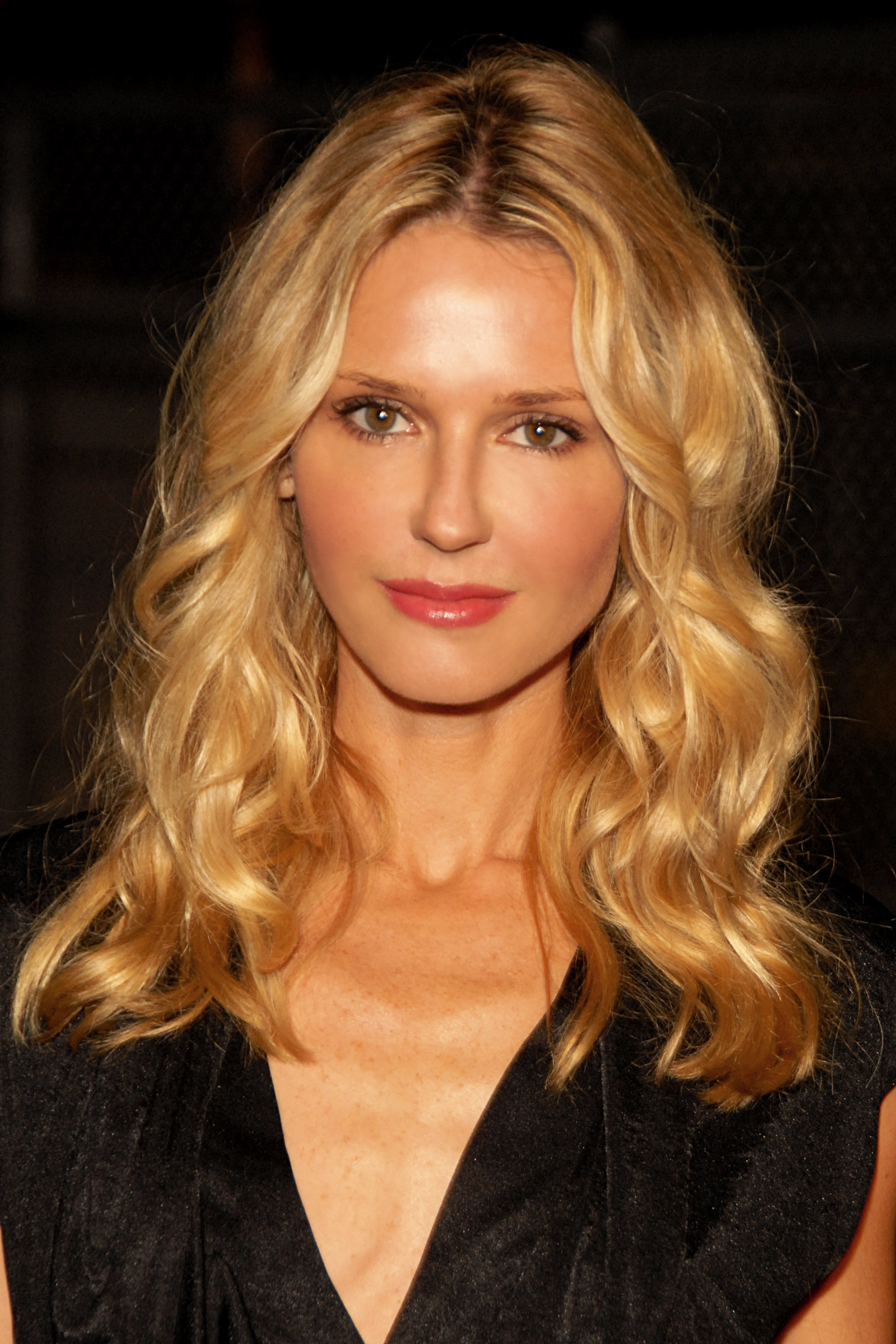
Graham McTavish and Vanessa Branch voiced Dante and Beatrice respectively both in the video game and in the animation.
- Graham McTavish – Dante
- Vanessa Branch – Beatrice
- Steve Blum – Lucifer
- Peter Jessop – Virgil
- Mark Hamill – Alighiero, Dante's father
- Victoria Tennant – Bella
- Bart McCarthy – Filippo Argenti
- Kevin Michael Richardson – King Minos, Phlegyas
- John Paul Karliak – Avenger
- Tom Tate – Francesco
- J. Grant Albrecht – Ciacco, Farinata Uberti
- Stephen Apostolina – Walla
- Nika Futterman – Female Prisoner, Lust Minion #4
- Charlotte Cornwell – Nessus, Lust Minion #3
- Vanessa Marshall – Lust Minion #2, Frozen Prisoner
- Grey DeLisle – Lust Minion #1, Dante (as 10 years old)
- H. Richard Greene – Socrates, King Richard I
- John Rees (as Greg Ellis) – Plato
- Shelley O'Neil – Child
- Nicholas Guest – Demon Priest
- Wendy Cutler – unspecified voice
- Lia Sargent – unspecified voice
- Mark Sussman – unspecified voice
- David Zyler (as Dave Zyler) – unspecified voice

== Crew ==
Co-directors (1 each from the various studios)

- Victor Cook
- Mike Disa
- Sang-Jin Kim
- Shûkô Murase
- Jong-Sik Nam
- Lee Seung-Gyu
- Yasuomi Umetsu

== Russia ban ==
In July 2021, the Oktyabrsky District Court in Saint Petersburg banned the film along with Happy Tree Friends and some films based on anime.
