= Catharine Clark Gallery =

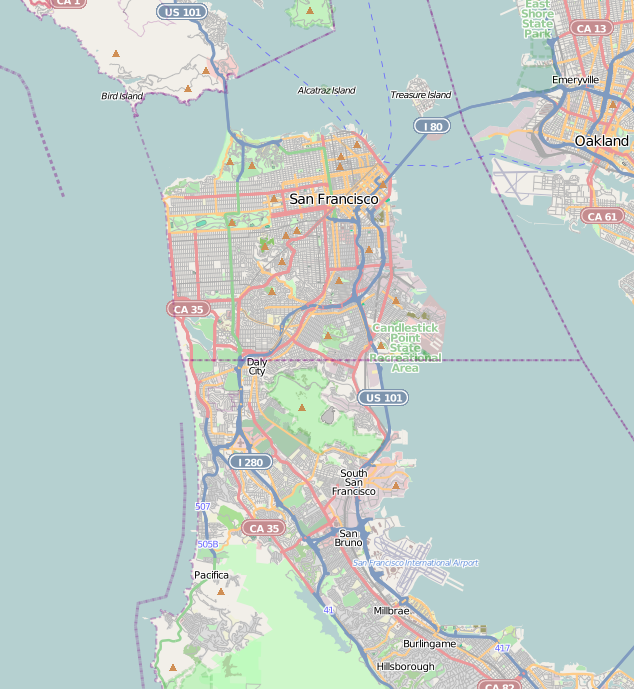
- Location of Catharine Clark Gallery in San Francisco
- Established: 1991
- Location: 248 Utah St, San Francisco, CA, United States
- Coordinates: 37.765732°N 122.40656°W
- Director: Catharine Clark
- Website: www.cclarkgallery.com

The Catharine Clark Gallery was established in 1991 and presents the work of contemporary, living artists using a variety of media. The gallery is located in San Francisco’s Potrero Hill Neighborhood, at 248 Utah Street. The Catharine Clark Gallery is the only commercial gallery in San Francisco with an entire room dedicated to showcasing video projects.

== History ==
The Catharine Clark Gallery opened in 1991 with a location in the Hayes Valley district of San Francisco. In 1995, the gallery moved from its original "hole in the wall" to a space at 49 Geary. In 2007, the gallery was moved to a location on nearby Minna Street. The new location placed the gallery close to the San Francisco Museum of Modern Art and the Museum of the African Diaspora. The move from Geary to Minna brought the gallery a larger, more consistent audience, as the gallery's change in location gave it greater independence from the numerous galleries at 49 Geary. With the demolition and on-going construction going on at the San Francisco MoMa next door, Clark decided to move her gallery once more, this time to 248 Utah Street in the Potrero Hill region of San Francisco. On September 7, 2013, the gallery opened its new location with an exhibition titled, "This is the Sound of Someone Losing the Plot," curated by Anthony Discenza.

== Exhibitions ==
Exhibitions at the Catharine Clark Gallery generally last six weeks and feature one or two individual artists' work in addition to work that is being shown in their dedicated media room. The gallery program has garnered critical attention from numerous publications, including The Guardian, The New York Times, the San Francisco Chronicle, and Artforum

The Catharine Clark Gallery's artists have been featured by numerous different galleries and museums in the United States and abroad. Institutions that have hosted their artists include: the Museum of Modern Art, the Whitney Museum of American Art, the San Francisco Museum of Modern Art, the de Young Museum, the Serpentine Gallery, the Smithsonian American Art Museum, the Queensland Art Gallery, and the Contemporary Arts Museum Houston.

== Locations ==
The Catharine Clark Gallery currently has two locations; the main gallery is located in San Francisco while a smaller salon space is located in Chelsea, Manhattan in New York City and is open only by appointment.

== Notable represented artists ==
- Sandow Birk
- Chris Doyle
- Ken Goldberg
- Julie Heffernan
- Laurel Roth Hope
- Nina Katchadourian
- Ellen Kooi
- LigoranoReese
- Stephanie Syjuco
- Masami Teraoka
- Kal Spelletich
