= SFJAZZ Center =

American all-ages music venue

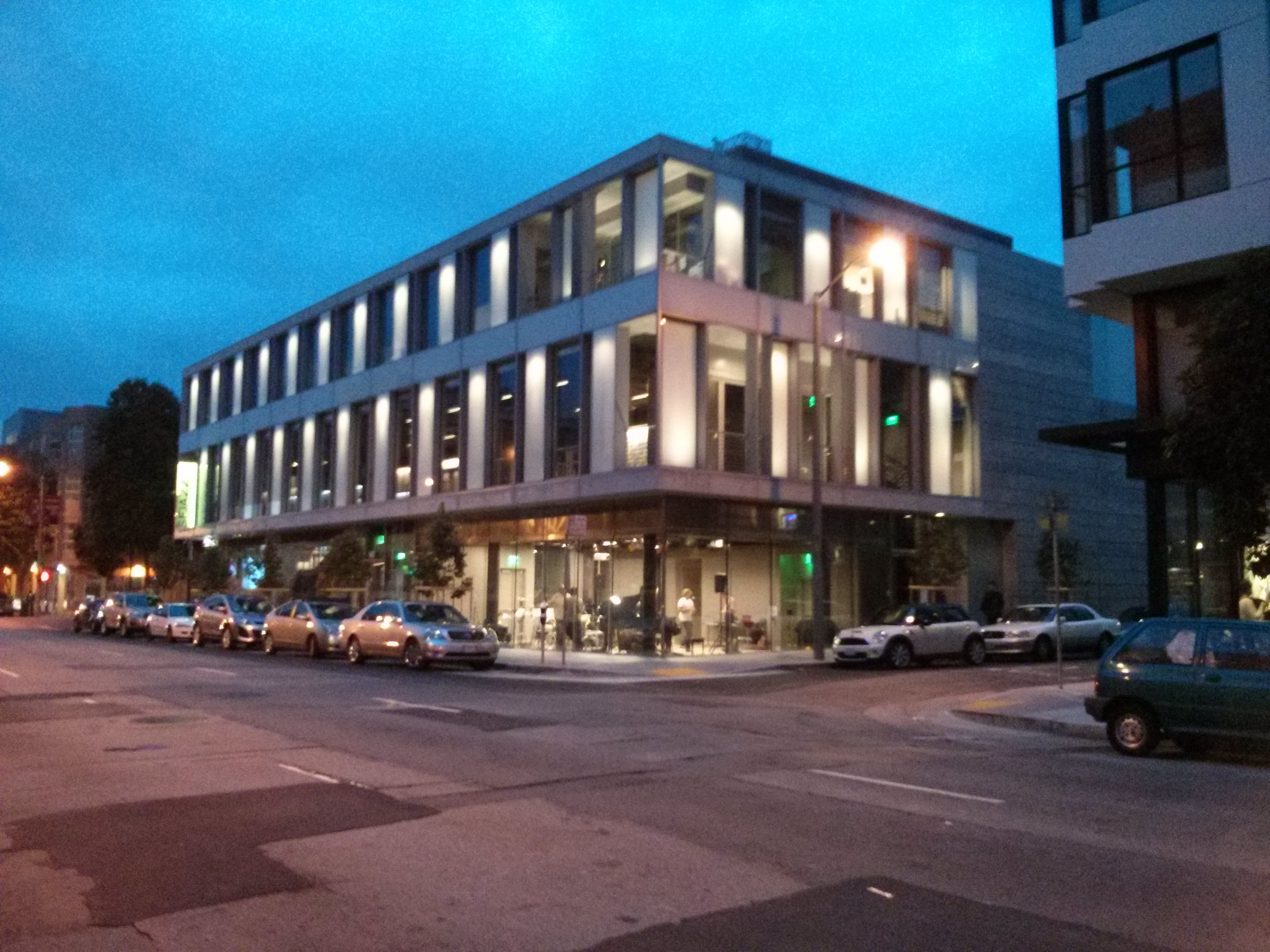
- Interactive map of SFJAZZ Center
- Address: 201 Franklin Street
- Location: San Francisco, California, US
- Coordinates: 37.7763°N 122.4214°W
- Owner: SFJAZZ
- Capacity: 350-700 (Miner Auditorium); 100 (Joe Henderson Lab)
- Event: Jazz

Construction
- Opened: January 2013
- Cost: $64 million
- Architect: Mark Cavagnero Associates

Website
- www.sfjazz.org

The SFJAZZ Center, also known as the SF Jazz Center, is an all-ages music venue in the Hayes Valley neighborhood of San Francisco, California, that opened in January 2013. It is recognized as the "first free-standing building in America specifically built for jazz performance and education." It is home to SFJAZZ, a not-for-profit organization dedicated to presenting and facilitating jazz education in the San Francisco Bay Area. Since 1983, SFJAZZ has produced the San Francisco Jazz Festival, and since 2004, the SFJAZZ Collective. The SFJAZZ season, in addition to the SFJAZZ-produced San Francisco Jazz Festival and Summer Sessions, includes over 400 performances annually in the San Francisco Bay Area.

Mark Cavagnero Associates designed the building at a cost of $64 million. The primary performance space is the Robert N. Miner Auditorium, with a sound system provided by Meyer Sound Laboratories. An additional performance space is the Joe Henderson Lab, used for classes and smaller concerts. The Center features murals by artists Sandow Birk and Elyse Pignolet.
