= Dante's Inferno (video game) =

2010 video game

- European cover art featuring protagonist Dante
- Developer: Visceral Games (Note: PlayStation Portable port developed by Artificial Mind and Movement)
- Publisher: Electronic Arts
- Directors: Jonathan Knight; Stephen Barry
- Producers: Jonathan Knight; Justin Lambros
- Designers: Stephen Desilets; Michael Cheng; Vincent Napoli
- Programmer: Brad McKee
- Artist: Ash Huang
- Writers: Jonathan Knight; Will Rokos
- Composers: Garry Schyman; Paul Gorman
- Platforms: PlayStation 3; Xbox 360; PlayStation Portable
- Release: February 4, 2010: PlayStation 3, Xbox 360; AU: February 4, 2010; EU: February 5, 2010; NA: February 9, 2010 PlayStation Portable; AU: February 25, 2010; EU: February 26, 2010; NA: March 1, 2010
- Genres: Action-adventure, hack and slash
- Modes: Single-player, multiplayer

Dante's Inferno is a 2010 action-adventure game developed by Visceral Games and published by Electronic Arts. The game was released for PlayStation 3, Xbox 360 and PlayStation Portable in February 2010. The PlayStation Portable version was developed by Artificial Mind and Movement.

The game's story is loosely based on Inferno, the first cantica of Italian poet Dante Alighieri's Divine Comedy. Intended as the first part of a trilogy, it follows Dante, imagined as a Templar knight from The Crusades, who, guided by the spirit of the poet Virgil, must fight through the nine Circles of Hell to rescue his wife Beatrice from the clutches of Lucifer himself. In the game, players control Dante from a third-person perspective. His primary weapon is a scythe that can be used in a series of combination attacks and finishing moves. Many attack combinations and abilities can be unlocked in exchange for souls, an in-game currency that is collected upon defeating enemies.

Before the game's release, Dante's Inferno underwent a prominent, elaborate, and at times controversial marketing campaign led by the game's publisher Electronic Arts. This included the advertisement of a fake religious game called Mass: We Pray, a motion controller-based game supposedly allowing players to engage in an interactive prayer and church sermon. Downloadable content was subsequently released, including Dark Forest, a prequel story, and Trials of St. Lucia, which features St. Lucia as a playable character.

Dante's Inferno received generally positive reviews by critics, with praise for the story, art direction, voice acting, sound design and depiction of Hell, though the gameplay received a mixed response due to repetitiveness in the latter half of the game and comparisons to the God of War series. It sold over one million copies worldwide and spawned a comic book miniseries and an animated movie, Dante's Inferno: An Animated Epic, which was released direct-to-DVD simultaneously with the game. Two sequels based on Purgatorio and Paradiso respectively and a mobile spin-off were planned before being all cancelled.

== Gameplay ==
Dante using the Holy Cross to absolve one of the minions

Dante's Inferno is an action-adventure game. The player controls Dante, the game's protagonist, and engages in fast-paced combat, platforming and environment-based puzzles. In the game, Dante's primary weapon is a scythe that can be used in a series of combination attacks and finishing moves. He has a Holy Cross that fires a volley of energy as a projectile attack. In addition, Dante can use numerous magic based attacks and abilities channeled from a mana pool to help in combat, many of which are obtained as the game progresses. A quick time event system is used when attempting to discharge the demon of its master (unbind from host) and during boss fights, where players must press the highlighted button on screen in order to continue the chain of attacks, or be countered and wounded otherwise.

Many attack combinations and abilities can be unlocked in exchange for souls, an in-game currency that is collected upon defeating enemies or locating soul fountains. Each of these skills fall into the Holy (represented by blue orbs) skill tree. At the beginning of the game, the skill tree is equal in power, but as Dante gains more Holy experience, more abilities become available for purchase. Experience is collected through the game's "Absolve" system, where, upon defeating enemies, Dante can absolve and save them with the Holy Cross. Much experience can also be accumulated in absolving the damned souls of many famous figures in history that appear in Dante Alighieri's original The Divine Comedy determining their fate, players enter a mini game where the characters' "sins" move towards the center of the screen, pressing required action symbols once the sin is in place. Players are rewarded with more souls and experience as the number of sins collected increases.

The game involves large sections of platforming, including swinging between ropes and climbing walls, both of which can involve hazards such as fire or swinging blades. There is also a series of environment-based puzzle sequences that can impair the progress of Dante's quest, such as requiring the correct positioning of movable objects or pulling levers at the appropriate time. In addition, there are numerous hidden passages where Biblical relics can be found and equipped to improve Dante's abilities.

== Story ==
=== Setting ===
Dante's Inferno is set in the year 1191, following the Siege of Acre. Following his participation in the siege, Dante (Graham McTavish), reimagined as a Knight Templar, survives both an assassination attempt by a Saracen Assassin and Death (Dee Bradley Baker) itself, who informs Dante that he is condemned to Hell for his sins. Dante returns to Florence to find his promised love Beatrice Portinari (Vanessa Branch) murdered and her soul taken away to Hell by Lucifer (John Vickery) himself, forcing Dante to give pursuit.

Other characters across Dante's traversal include the famed poet Virgil (Bart McCarthy), who accompanies Dante across the Nine Circles, Dante's father Alighiero (JB Blanc) and mother Bella, Beatrice's brother Francesco and the Archangel Gabriel. Some known historic figures of Inferno take place as bosses Dante must confront before proceeding, such as Queen Cleopatra (Alison Lees-Taylor) and her lover Mark Antony (Lewis Macleod) as well as King Minos (Richard Moll), who oversees Limbo as the Judge of the Damned.

=== Plot ===
Beginning his traversal to Hell, Dante blesses a holy cross that Beatrice gave him when making their vows to be true to each other, while traversing the Nine Circles in pursuit of Beatrice, who is corrupted and then turned into a succubus by Lucifer due to Dante's infidelities after Beatrice waged her soul with Lucifer concerning Dante's faithfulness in exchange for his safety overseas.

As the pursuit goes on further and further into Hell, memories of Dante's past life and sins are revealed and confronted by him. It is revealed Dante passed by an abusive childhood under Alighiero which ended up prompting Bella to commit suicide by hanging and thus grew up to become an impatient, violent man, who joined the Third Crusade after being promised by a bishop (later revealed to be a 'salesman of salvation') that his sins would be absolved. In Acre, when ordered by King Richard I to keep guard over 3.000 prisoners as ransom for the True Cross taken by King Saladin (among them a captive woman who offered to sleep with Dante in exchange for the life of her 'brother', revealed to be the assassin which was actually her husband), Dante gives in to his violent instincts and gets into a rampage, slaughtering most of the prisoners. When confronted by Richard himself, Francesco takes the fall for Dante's deeds and is thus hanged.

Upon realizing the extent of his sins, especially not confessing to the prisoners' massacre and allowing Francesco to be executed, Dante resigns his pursuit and admits he belongs in Hell, asking forgiveness to Beatrice while giving her the holy cross back, which redeems her soul for Gabriel to take away to Heaven. Gabriel assures Dante his redemption is at hand and he will see Beatrice again, but must confront Lucifer himself at the final Circle, Treachery.

Fighting Lucifer at Lake Cocytus, it is revealed Lucifer took Beatrice to lure Dante into Hell, aware his pursuit would prompt him to sever the Chains of Judecca that kept Lucifer imprisoned. It is also revealed Dante was actually killed by the Saracen Assassin back in Acre and thus cannot leave Hell. While Lucifer gloats that he will now rise to Heaven and lead a second Rebellion to overthrow God, Dante uses the souls he absolved on his journey across Hell to absolve himself and re-imprison Lucifer.

Being shifted away to Mount Purgatory by Beatrice, Dante removes his original skin-stitched cross tapestry now turned black as he starts his pilgrimage to the mountain top, stating he "did not die, and yet did not live". The black tapestry itself transforms into a snake as Lucifer's laugh echoes, implying Dante's confrontation with him is still not finished.

== Release ==
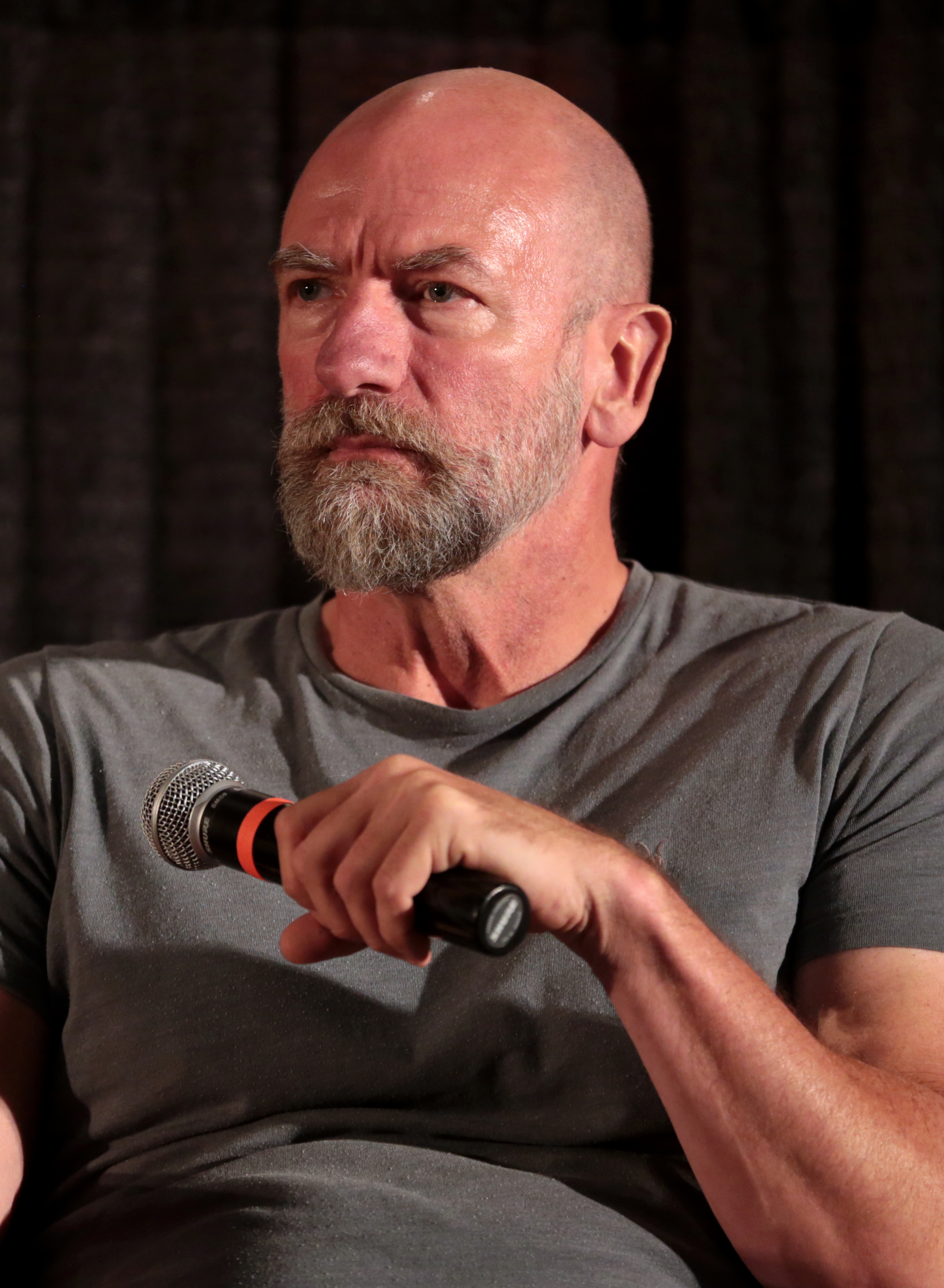
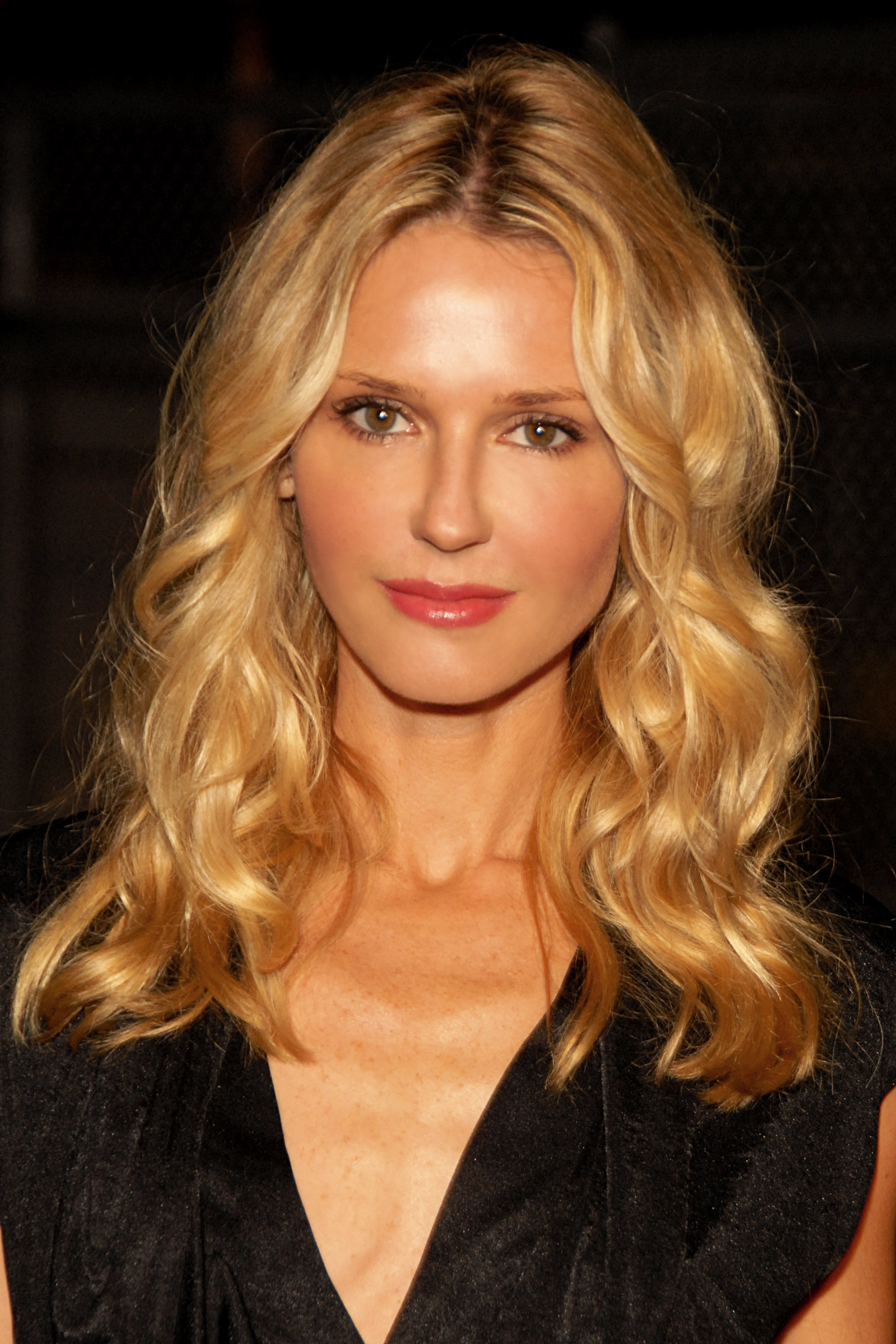
Graham McTavish and Vanessa Branch voiced Dante and Beatrice respectively both in the video game and in the tie-in movie Dante's Inferno: An Animated Epic.

A playable demo was released for PlayStation 3 on December 10, 2009, and for Xbox 360 on December 24, 2009. Dante's Inferno was first released in Australasia on February 4, 2010, and later across Europe on February 5 and in North America on February 9, 2010. In September 2026 developer, nicknamed florinp93, using XenonRecomp, a tool that allows you to recompile the game code from PowerPC to C++, made a native PC port, which allows everyone to play on Windows without using any emulation.

=== Special editions ===
In addition to the standard retail copy of the game, a second limited special edition of the game for both the Xbox 360 and PlayStation 3 was released alongside known as the "Death Edition". Along with the standard copy of the game, the Death Edition was packaged in a fold out card packaging depicting each circle of hell as well as a second bonus disc that featured a making-of documentary, the documentary "Dante in History", the full soundtrack, a documentary on the creation of the music and audio, a digital art book (Barlowe's Inferno) edited by visual designer Wayne Barlowe, over 10 minutes of scenes from Dante's Inferno: An Animated Epic, and a digital reprint of the complete original poem in English by Henry Wadsworth Longfellow. The edition also included a voucher containing an online activated code for an additional skin model for Dante: the space suit of Isaac Clarke, the main character from Visceral's previous game Dead Space. UK retailer Gamestation also gave away miniature figurines of Dante to those who pre-ordered the game. The edition was originally released in Europe, and later also in Australia along with the standard copy on February 15, 2010, exclusive to EB Games.

In North America, unlike the Europe and Australia release, a special version called the "Divine Edition" was released in place of the standard copy for the PlayStation 3 only. Similar to the Death Edition, the Divine Edition includes nearly all the same features except the Isaac Clarke costume and the animated scene but instead includes a code for the Dark Forest downloadable content, to be released later in March.

On May 14, 2010, the "St. Lucia Edition" was released in Italy, containing the Dark Forest and Trials of St Lucia DLCs and St. Lucia as a playable character in the cooperative gameplay.

=== Downloadable content ===
Upon its release, a series of downloadable content (DLC) game packs were released, each containing a number of souls, used for purchasing new abilities. The first contained 500 souls and was free of charge while the rest contained 1500, 3000 and 5000 souls and cost a relatively small amount and could only be downloaded once.

The first traditional piece of downloadable content was released a month after release on March 4, entitled Dark Forest, a prologue level loosely based on the opening of The Divine Comedy, that sees Dante in a dark forest before meeting Virgil. The content includes two new enemies known as the "Forest Siren" and "Death Knight" and involves a series of puzzles to overcome. In addition to the level, the download also includes an additional "Disco Inferno" costume, a novelty piece in the style of polyester disco fashion wear.

Numerous alternative costumes have also been released, including Florentine Dante based on the real life poet Dante Alighieri released on February 18, 2010 and Animated Film Dante, based on the appearance of the character from Dante's Inferno: An Animated Epic, released one week later.

Trials of St Lucia, released on April 29, 2010, featured cooperative gameplay and a game-editor. Players were able to share their created maps and levels with others. The new playable character in this DLC was St. Lucia, a Christian martyr described as Dante's guardian angel. The publisher of the game, Electronic Arts, shut down the servers for Trials of St. Lucia on December 8, 2023 leaving the DLC entirely unplayable.

== Marketing ==
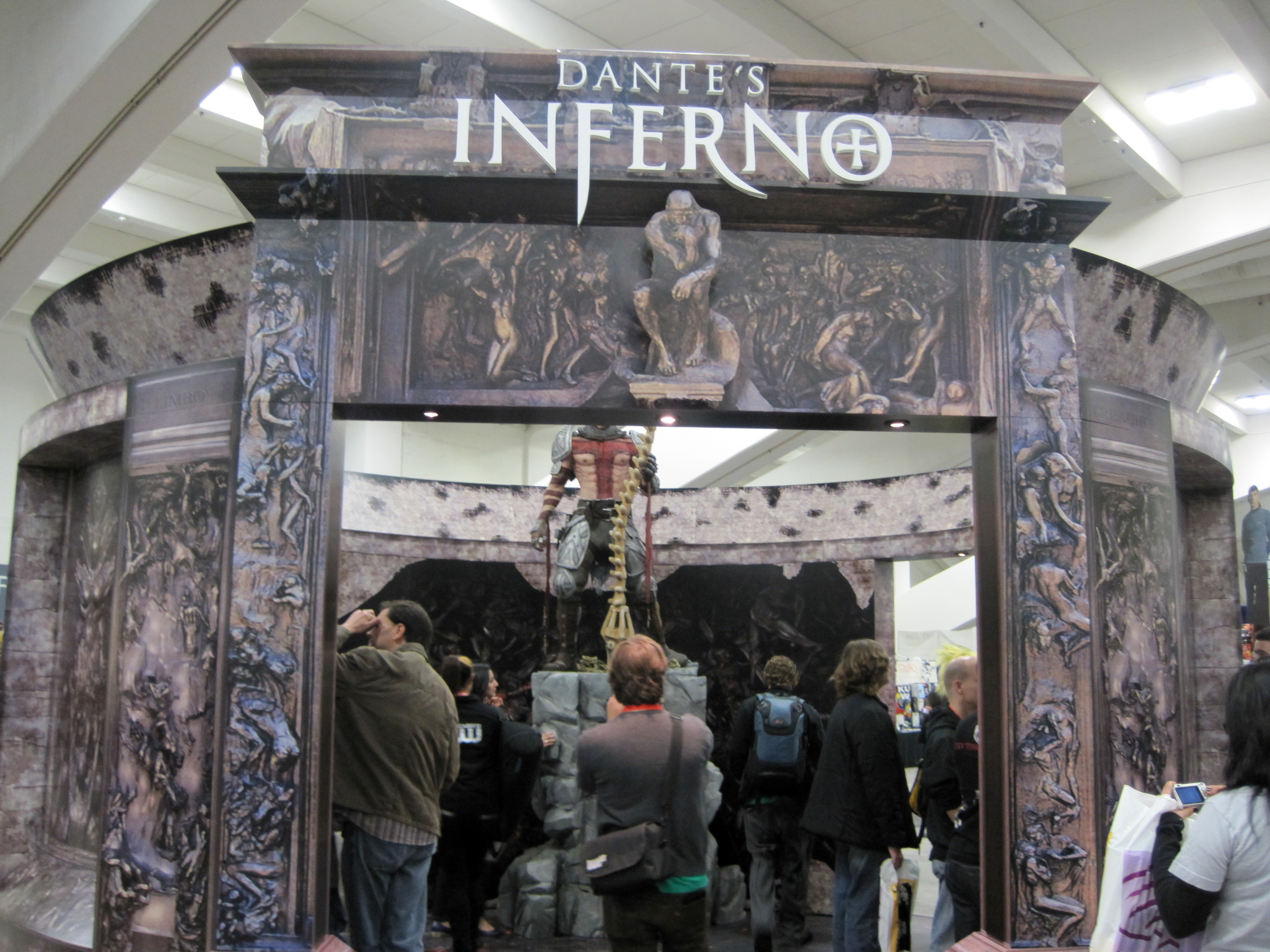
Dante's Inferno demo booth at the 2010 WonderCon

Before the game's release, Dante's Inferno underwent a prominent, at times elaborate marketing campaign led by the game's publisher Electronic Arts. The numerous advertisements highlighted certain sins associated with the circles of hell, at times promoting fake services before accusing the viewer of the sin linked to it.

Electronic Arts partnered with GameStop for a one-day promotion of Dante's Inferno on September 9, 2009 (9/9/9). Those that pre-ordered the game were offered a $6.66 discount, the Number of the Beast. In addition, EA conducted an unsolicited mailing in which checks for $200 were sent to selected video game critics, with the following note: "In Dante's Inferno, Greed is a two-headed beast. Hoarding wealth feeds one beast, and squandering it satiates the other. By cashing this check you succumb to avarice by hoarding filthy lucre, but by not cashing it, you waste it, and thereby surrender to prodigality. Make your choice and suffer the consequence for your sin. And scoff not, for consequences are imminent."

Prior to Dante's Inferno's release, in June 2009, a protest began during E3 2009 in Los Angeles to oppose the game. Around 20 protesters, claiming to be from a church in Ventura County, held up signs that called the game sacrilegious and labeled it possibly insensitive to people's beliefs. Protesters even went as far as calling EA the anti-christ. This led to EA being accused by many people of staging the fiasco to use it as a marketing hoax. A few days later, it was officially confirmed by EA spokesman Tammy Scachter that they had hired people to protest the game and that there was no actual protest. However, in the aftermath of this revelation, several Christian bloggers protested to this, calling it an "anti-Christian" stunt.

A viral marketing campaign was also launched featuring a website and ad for a fake religious game called Mass: We Pray, a motion controller-based game supposedly allowing players to engage in an interactive prayer and church sermon. When a person attempted to order the game, the website deemed them a heretic and played a trailer for Dante's Inferno, as well as providing links to the related Facebook application called "Go to Hell". The application, created by Visceral Games, allowed users to condemn their friends, groups, or photos to one of the nine circles of hell, where votes were collected to either absolve them or torment them with activities like "beast massage" or "succubus castration."

Later in October 2009, EA sent a series of packages to Veronica Belmont at Qore, the PlayStation: The Official Magazine offices and Ben "Yahtzee" Croshaw of the Escapist's Zero Punctuation column. The package contained a small wooden box which, when opened, played the Rick Astley song "Never Gonna Give You Up", thus "Rickrolling" the journalists that received it. The music could not be stopped through any means other than destroying the box using the hammer and goggles provided. After destroying the box, as Belmont did in a YouTube video, the recipient found a note inside stating that they had given in to Wrath by doing so.

EA produced a commercial for the game that was shown during Super Bowl XLIV, a fast-paced cinematic of Dante's descent into hell, overplayed by what was considered an unusual use of Bill Withers' song "Ain't No Sunshine". Time magazine reporter James Poniewozik referred to the ad as "something magical and funny." According to EA product manager Phil Marineu, the decision to air the ad was to concentrate on more solid titles that they believe can break through to the masses.

Another secretly fake commercial for the fictional company "Hawk Panther" encouraged viewers to visit the Hawk Panther website in order to be able to steal their best friend's girlfriend. If the link to find out more about the Hawk Panther systems is clicked on a message appears stating, "TREACHERY! Thou are condemned to the 9th Circle. Thou hast broken the bonds of trust with thy kindred. Even conspiring to stealeth thy best friend's soul mate is the worst kind of mortal offense imaginable. You shall pay for thy treachery by spending an eternity immersed up to your face, the place where shame shows itself, in the putrid, frozen waters of Hell." The site also shows a trailer of Dante's Inferno and a link to buy the game.

The Facebook application developer Lolapps similarly adapted a Facebook role-playing game, Battle of the Damned, that lets users fight through the nine circles of hell to rescue their murdered and damned wife. It rose nearly 1 million monthly active users in less than a year after launching.

== Reception ==
=== Dante's Inferno ===
Dante's Inferno

Aggregate score
Aggregator	Score		
Aggregator	PS3	PSP	Xbox 360
Metacritic	75/100	70/100	73/100

Review scores
Publication	Score		
Publication	PS3	PSP	Xbox 360
Destructoid	9/10	N/A	9/10
Edge	6/10	N/A	N/A
Eurogamer	N/A	N/A	6/10
Game Informer	7/10	N/A	7/10
GamePro	4/5	N/A	N/A
GameRevolution	C+	N/A	C+
GameSpot	6.5/10	N/A	6.5/10
GameSpy	N/A	N/A	3.5/5
GameTrailers	N/A	N/A	6.8/10
GameZone	N/A	N/A	7/10
Giant Bomb	N/A	N/A	2/5
IGN	(US) 7.5/10 (UK) 7/10	4.5/10	(US) 7.5/10 (UK) 7/10
Official Xbox Magazine (US)	N/A	N/A	7.5/10
PlayStation: The Official Magazine	4/5	3/5	N/A
The Daily Telegraph	6/10	N/A	N/A
Wired	7/10	N/A	N/A

Dante's Inferno received "generally favorable reviews" from critics for the PlayStation 3 version and "mixed or average reviews" for Xbox 360 and PlayStation Portable versions, according to review aggregator Metacritic. While there was substantial praise for the art style and level design, numerous critics drew unfavorable comparisons with Sony's popular God of War series, among other more fundamental criticisms, such as monotonous and repetitive gameplay in the latter half of the game.

One of the most praised aspects was the game's depiction of Hell, considered creative yet graphic in nature. GamePro found the unique designs of the circles of Hell to be "impressively constructed", getting "a lot of mileage out of the unique setting". While some critics like Jeff Haynes of IGN acknowledged the liberties taken with the original source material, they still observed that "much of what you see is appropriate for a game that tries to explore the extreme nature of Hell and its punishments", calling the overall style "visually impressive". Other critics like GameSpy even found some enemy and setting designs "shocking" yet still could "appreciate that this is Hell, and it's supposed to be disturbing".

However, some reviews felt the creativity waned towards the end of the game, such as GameSpot who felt "Dante's epic quest loses momentum long before you reach the end", praising earlier levels such as Lust and Gluttony yet criticizing the 10 stage challenge level of Fraud and the use of enemies outside of their respective circle. PlayStation Official Magazine – UK also echoed this view, saying that the game was "just going through motions for the last three or four hours", despite what it considered to have a "robust fighting system" and being "visually strong".

The most recurring sentiment over the gameplay of Dante's Inferno was its similarities to the God of War games. Destructoid felt that being similar to what is regarded as a great game is a positive by stating "You're not going to find a wholly original gameplay experience with Dante's Inferno, but that doesn't mean it's not a hell of an entertaining package - it's one that fans of action shouldn't miss." Eurogamer on the other hand felt the game was "a God of War clone at its core", that while "not a terrible game, it's just not an original one", a view GameTrailers echoed by stating "battles can be engaging, but lack some of the grace and refinement exhibited by games like God of War". While Game Informer also found the gameplay to be too familiar, they did find the additional elements such as the punish/absolve mechanic and usable relics to give the title "some individuality".

Wired gave the PS3 version of Dante's Inferno a score of seven stars out of ten, and called it "a ballsy take on literature that worships at the altar of God of War." However, Nick Cowen of The Daily Telegraph gave the same version six out of ten, saying that it was "by no means a terrible game, but it's not an essential title and I wouldn't recommend paying full price for it. If a sequel is on the cards – as is hinted by the ending – the developers would do well to institute a more consistent level of quality. Until then, one can't damn the players of Dante's Inferno for trading the nine circles of hell for a trip to Hades with Kratos." The A.V. Club gave the Xbox 360 version a C+, saying, "The game's rivers of blood, corpse-piles, and wailing souls make for a morbid, depression-inducing milieu. It's a relief to be shut out of the place once the final credits roll." In Japan, Famitsu gave the PS3 and Xbox 360 versions a score of all four eights for a total of 32 out of 40.

Regarding such similarities, in an interview for PlayStation Official Magazine – UK, God of War III director Stig Asmussen instead praised the game, stating "We've been intrigued about Dante's Inferno. This is my favourite genre, and the more people that are making [these games] the better", going on to say "and this is a really rich story they're building on, it's very interesting. The day that the demo came out we were trying to download it on PSN at midnight. We all wanted to see it."

Columbia University Professor Teodolinda Barolini, a former president of the Dante Society of America, criticized the game for its depiction of Beatrice, declaring, "Of all the things that are troubling, the sexualization and infantilization of Beatrice are the worst. Beatrice is the human girl who is dead and is now an agent of the divine. She is not to be saved by him, she is saving him. That's the whole point! Here, she has become the prototypical damsel in distress. She's this kind of bizarrely corrupted Barbie doll." Other reviews of the game include similar comments from professors regarding the characters: "Beatrice saves Dante... not the other way around," says Professor Arielle Saiber, an Italian literature professor at Bowdoin College.

United States NPD Group sales data showed that the PS3 and Xbox 360 versions of Dante's Inferno sold 242,500 and 224,700 copies respectively in February 2010, its first month of release. The two editions also debuted together on the UK's top 10 games list for that month.

=== Trials of St. Lucia ===
Trials of St. Lucia

Aggregate score
Aggregator	Score	
Aggregator	PS3	Xbox 360
Metacritic	72/100	83/100

Review scores
Publication	Score	
Publication	PS3	Xbox 360
GameSpot	5.5/10	N/A
GameTrailers	N/A	8/10
Play	80%	N/A

The Xbox 360 version of the Trials of St. Lucia DLC received "favorable" reviews, while the PS3 version received "average" reviews, according to the review aggregation website Metacritic. GameTrailers said that the Xbox 360 version "may be a little steep [at 10 dollars], but it gives Dante a shot of much-needed replayability. With online co-op, a seemingly-enthusiastic community, and a suite of solid online features, the original game suddenly feels like it has some legs." However, GameSpot said that the PS3 version "does an admirable job of turning the worst idea from the original adventure into something entertaining, but it's still hampered by the same problems that made those initial trials such a drag. It's only entertaining to swing your blood-soaked scythe for so long because the combat is shallow and the objectives only offer a slight change to the core experience. However, the in-depth editor, extra playable character, and cooperative mode are different enough to lure back anyone anxious to be wrapped up in hell's clutches for a few more hours."

=== Controversy ===
In October 2009, it was announced that the game would include a PlayStation 3 trophy and an Xbox 360 achievement entitled "Bad Nanny", which is awarded to players for killing monsters resembling children, supposedly the lost souls of unbaptized infants. This sparked a conflict with the International Nanny Association (INA), in which they encouraged supporters to oppose the game. The INA claimed that the achievement is offensive to real nannies and that it also promotes real-life violence. The INA asked the Entertainment Software Rating Board (ESRB) to omit the reward and elements of infant violence. The ESRB insisted that its role was merely to label products appropriately, not to censor them, so their request could not be met. Dante's Inferno was released with the "Bad Nanny" achievement intact.

== Legacy ==
=== Animated film ===
Film Roman, the Starz Entertainment unit behind Dead Space: Downfall, released an animated direct-to-DVD version of the story that was released simultaneously with the video game. The Dante's Inferno project had separate anime studios being tapped to create visuals of the nine levels of the Inferno. Starz Entertainment is looking to sell both animated films to international TV buyers at the MIP market. The animation studios that participated in the making of Dante's Inferno: An Animated Epic, in order, are Film Roman, Manglobe, Dong Woo, JM Animation, and Production I.G. The released movie shows a difference in storyline and has been divided into four different styles.

=== Comics ===
WildStorm published a six-part comic book series based on the video game from December 2009 (two month before the video game release) through May 2010. The series was written by Christos Gage with art by Diego Latorre.

=== Canceled live action film ===
In 2013 it was reported that Universal Studios was developing a live action film based on the video game with director Fede Álvarez to direct and produced by Eric Newman and Marc Abraham with EA Entertainment vice president Patrick O'Brien.

=== Related media ===
Dante appears as a playable character in the PSP version of Army of Two: The 40th Day, unlockable after finishing the game by always making morally-bad choices.

In August 2014, Tal Peleg, senior cinematic animator at Naughty Dog, released a fan-made CGI short movie inspired by the game, titled Dante's Redemption. A sequel titled Dante's Redemption: ACT1 was released in November 2018.

== Cancelled sequels ==
Dante's Inferno was originally intended as the first part of a trilogy, with the sequels based on the second and third poem in The Divine Comedy: Purgatorio and Paradiso; however, they were never made. While in 2010 it was initially announced that Visceral had no plans for a sequel, in November 2011, Assassin's Creed II co-writer Joshua Rubin announced that he had been hired as a writer for a video game sequel that was heavily hinted to be a sequel to Dante's Inferno, but no further information was released. Later reports confirmed that Purgatorio entered development and had a finished script, playable chapter, and a climbing mechanic in order to reach the top of the Mount Purgatory, but it was canceled without being publicly revealed; according to Alex Riviello of Polygon, this was due to the disappointing sales of the first game. On November 5, 2025, IGN published an official assortment of internal documents of Dante's Purgatorio, including concept arts, cutscene storyboards, screenshots, a 240-page script by Rubin, and details about the plot of the third planned game Paradiso.

A 2D sidescroller mobile game based on Dante's Inferno was also in development by IronMonkey Studios, but was cancelled by EA after six months of work as the studio shifted its priorities to the emerging free-to-play mobile game market.
