= Chris Doyle (artist) =

Multi-media artist

- Born: July 6, 1959; Easton, Pennsylvania, U.S.
- Died: July 22, 2025 (aged 66); Blue Hill, Maine, U.S.
- Education: Boston College (B.F.A.); Harvard University (M.Arch.)
- Occupation: Artist
- Spouses: Eileen Garred (divorced); Timothy Houlihan (m. 2017)
- Children: 1

Christopher Doyle (July 6, 1959 – July 22, 2025) was an American multi-media artist. He worked and lived in Williamsburg, Brooklyn, Mexico City, and Blue Hill, Maine. In his animation-based practice, he explored aspiration and progress, his main goal was to question “the foundation of a culture consumed by striving.” Through his work, he sought to depict a world anxious in the shadow of a looming apocalypse, where environmental disaster and social inequities continue with increasing prevalence and complexity. To further drive his focus of restoration and conservation, his work often featured industrial ruin, debris, and waste.

== Early life and education ==
Doyle was born in Easton, Pennsylvania, on July 6, 1959. His family moved frequently because of his father's career. Doyle received his B.F.A. at Boston College School of Arts and Sciences in 1981, and received his Master of Architecture from Harvard University's Graduate School of Design in 1985.

== Career ==
Along his body of public work, his animations, paintings and drawings have been shown at MASS MoCA, MoMA P.S.1 Museum of Contemporary Art, Olana, The Brooklyn Museum of Art, The Queens Museum of Art, the Tang Museum, the Hood Museum of Art at Dartmouth College, the Brooklyn Academy of Music, the Kupferstichkabinett Berlin, Germany, The Taubman Museum of Art, the Norton Museum in Palm Beach; the Schneider Museum of Art in Ashland Oregon; and Sculpture Center in New York. His animations have been included as part of the New York Video Festival at Lincoln Center, and the Melbourne International Arts Festival (2005).

Some of his public projects have included Bright Canyon, which was presented by the Times Square Alliance and used Times Square's electronic billboards to create the illusion of a canyon with waterfalls and animals (2014); "The Fluid", an animation installation on screens inside the Fulton Street subway station (2017); Leap, a video projection in New York City's Columbus Circle, presented by Creative Time (2000); and Commutable, where he gilded the commuter and bike path on the Williamsburg Bridge in 22k gold, presented by the Public Art Fund on the Lower East Side (1996).

=== Notable concepts ===
==== Cycles ====
In an interview with Patricia Maloney, Doyle refers to a painting series called The Course of an Empire, by Thomas Cole. From this painting series, which delves into how our understanding of our relationship with the environment has created a sense of menace. Doyle was intrigued by the cyclicality of civilization and created a series of animations, beginning with the "fulcrum moment of disaster," in his piece Apocalypse Management. In the original painting series, Cole depicts a brief rise to glory and followed by a sudden and dramatic collapse and overtaking by nature. This could be interpreted as an allusion to a situation quickly and without warning getting out of control. Likewise, Doyle also focused on how quickly something can get out of control, but also how it rebuilds. In his interview with Patricia Maloney, he discussed his interest in how our relationship with nature is constantly changing in a cyclical form, and he wanted to focus on the cultural interpretation of nature rather than nature itself.

==== Man and nature ====
In an interview with 21c Museum, Doyle goes into further detail about his view on the interaction of man and nature. Doyle says that he does not believe in "the duality between man and nature," and that everything we make, including all of our trash and pollution, is an extension of nature. He believes that we have been taught to think of ourselves as separate from animals and nature, and his pieces such as Bright Canyon are meant to connect people and make them feel whole with nature. Doyle's piece aimed to reconnect Times Square to the natural environment it had been before the city had been built, exposing any passer-by to the positive effects of being connected to nature.

==== Place at a specific time ====
In 1996, Doyle created the piece Commutable with the Public Art Fund in New York. The piece was $7,500 of 22k gold gilded on the stairway and bike path on the Manhattan side of the Williamsburg Bridge. As people used this path, they in turn tracked gold flakes throughout the surrounding areas. This piece was different from his usual work because instead of creating a piece that was for people to look at or walk around, he "wanted to do something people could use." He wanted this piece to bring attention to an area that was seemingly abandoned by the city after construction was halted on the bridge. Even though he knew the bridge would one day be demolished, he explained that it is not about making a monument, but about transforming a place at a specific time. Like other art exhibits that make use of a community or area, this piece was greatly appreciated by pedestrians walking and riding along the bridge. According to Joshua Guetzkow in his article "How the Arts Impact Communities", art pieces such as this help communities "build social capital by boosting individuals’ ability and motivation to be civically engaged, as well as building organizational capacity for effective action." By creating a venue that brought people together and brought attention to this "bleak spot", he was able to make a positive impact on residents by giving "the community some gold".

== Solo exhibitions ==
2023

Ramifications, Digital Animation on LED Screen, Permanent Installation, Zero Irving, Studio Rotation I, Fundacion Op.Cit, Mexico City, Mexico

2022

Shorebirds, Performance Installation, Collaboration with composer Jeremy Turner, Performed by Simone Porter, Lotusland, Montecito, CA The Fabricators, Solo Exhibition, Center for Main Contemporary Art, Rockland, ME

2021

The Fluid (seven channel version), Permanent Installation, The Ameswell Hotel, Mountain View, CA

2020

Parables of Correction, Catharine Clark Gallery, San Francisco, CA The Newly Fallen, Presented by Cynthia Winings Gallery on the John Murphy Trail, Blue Hill, ME

2018

Unexpected Narratives, Norton Museum of Art, Palm Beach, FL Swell, Curated by Sutton Beres Culler for Bellwether, Bellevue, Washington

=== 2017 ===
Hollow and Swell, Catharine Clark Gallery, San Francisco, CA The Fluid, Fulton Street Station, MTA Arts for Transit, New York, NY In the Labyrinth, University of Michigan Museum of Art, Ann Arbor, MI Presto!, Presented by Converge 45, Portland, OR Dreams of Infinite Luster, 21C Museum Hotel, Durham, NC

=== 2016 ===
Recent Animation and Work on Paper, Texas Contemporary, Catharine Clark Gallery, Houston, TX Apocalypse Management, RL Window, Ryan Lee Gallery, New York, NY Union, Collaboration with The Louisville Ballet and The Louisville Symphony Orchestra, Louisville, KY

=== 2015 ===
Animations from The Lightening. an outdoor projection at the Miami Project, Dec 1–6, 2015, Miami, FL The Lightening, 50th Anniversary Project for Wave Hill, Riverdale, New York, April–May, 2015. (cat) Landscape Fictions, Glyndor Gallery at Wave Hill, Bronx, NY (cat)

== Awards ==
Doyle received the Creative Capital Visual Arts Award in 2000. He is the recipient of a 2014 John Simon Guggenheim Foundation Fellowship and the 2014 Borusan Contemporary Art Collection Prize. Doyle has also been awarded grants from the Creative Capital Foundation, New York Foundation for the Arts, NYSCA, and the MAP Fund.

== Personal life ==
In 2017, Doyle married Timothy Houlihan, his partner of twenty years; the couple primarily lived in Williamsburg, Brooklyn until 2025, when they moved to their home in Blue Hill, Maine. He was previously married to Eileen Garred, and had a daughter.

Doyle died at his home in Maine on July 22, 2025, at the age of 66, after a cardiac event.
