= Elyse Pignolet =

American visual artist

- Born: Oakland, California
- Occupation: Artist
- Known for: Ceramics

Elyse Pignolet is a visual artist living and working in Los Angeles, California.

== Early life and education ==
Born in Oakland, California, Elyse Pignolet is an American with Filipino heritage. She studied fine arts at California State University, San Francisco. She continued her studies at California State University, Long Beach, on a CSU exchange program. In 2001 she lived in Madrid and Barcelona, Spain, studying arts and Spanish. She completed her BFA degree at CSU Long Beach in 2007. Her studies included an intensive ceramics exchange through mainland China in 2007, and participation in the International Ceramics Biennal in Korea, also in 2007. Pignolet has conducted extensive research in Portugal, with an emphasis on "azulejo" tile painting techniques, as well as in Mexico City. Pignolet currently is based in Los Angeles, with a studio in San Pedro, California.

== Career ==
Elyse Pignolet works primarily in ceramics. The main themes she has pursued include social issues, topics from contemporary news articles, and urban themes. She has created several bodies of work that place the extensive history of ceramics in contrast with the temporary nature of graffiti. Other ceramics projects have juxtaposed the brash nature of political news headlines with the subtle shapes of traditional ceramic forms.

In 2016, Pignolet was commissioned by the Orange County Museum of Art (OCMA) to create a site-specific ceramic tile wall mural for the exhibition "American Qur'an". It is 16 feet high and 14 feet across, and features elaborate decorative designs and verses. In 2017, the artwork was acquired by the Jordan Schnitzer Museum of Art in Eugene, Oregon.

In 2016, Pignolet won a commission from the Los Angeles Cultural Affairs Dept. to design, fabricate, and install a large public mural at the Gaffey Street "Hey Rookie" Public Swimming Pool in San Pedro. The mural is some 10' high and more than 30' long, and features hand-made and hand-painted ceramic tiles which depict imagery from the history of San Pedro and the harbor area of Los Angeles, from the earliest days as a whaling outpost, to a Portuguese fishing village, a Japanese fishing village, a fish canning area, through Fort MacArthur in WWII, and on up to the contemporary bustle of its function as an international cargo port.

A book, The Depravities of War, featuring her work in printmaking, was released in Sept. 2007 from Grand Central Publishing in Santa Ana, CA.

An exhibition of her drawings were exhibited at the Catharine Clark Gallery in San Francisco in June and July 2008.

Her works have been featured in several contemporary arts publications including the LA Weekly, Juxtapoz Magazine, and the Los Angeles Times.

Pignolet has often collaborated with artist Sandow Birk, most notably in large-scale print projects done with Mullowney Printing, both in Hawaii and in San Francisco. The projects have been very large scale woodblock prints dealing with social issues from the War in Iraq to American political history.

In 2019, Pignolet's work "American Procession" was featured in an exhibition at the Long Beach Museum of Art.

In spring of 2019, Pignolet had a solo exhibition of ceramic vessel works, hand-made and decorated with azulejo blue patterns containing subtle texts with referenced women's issues, sexual assault allegations, and catch phrases often demeaning to women. Her works have been lauded as part of a new wave of feminist works taking on contemporary social issues important to women.

In fall of 2019 she will have a solo show of new works at Track 16 Gallery in Los Angeles.

== Collaborations ==
Pignolet has collaborated with other artists as studio assistant and in many public art projects. Working with Tom Barter, she has completed large scale public projects in Long Beach, CA, and Signal Hill, CA. She has also collaborated with Sandow Birk on three public projects in Los Angeles, CA, including the Tarzana Metro Station on the Los Angeles County Metropolitan Transportation Authority (MTA) Orange Line, as well as the LAPD Hollenbeck Division Police Station murals in Boyle Heights, East Los Angeles. More recently, she completed a huge tile mural project in San Pedro, commissioned by the Los Angeles Cultural Affairs Department in 2016.

== Movie career ==
Elyse Pignolet was art director for the movie Dante's Inferno, in 2007. The film is told in toy theatre style puppetry and premiered at the Slamdance Film Festival in January 2007. It won the Best Director Award at the Silverlake Film Festival in Los Angeles in 2007, and won the Audience Favorite Award at the San Francisco International Film Festival in 2007.

Pignolet worked on the film "In Smog and Thunder" from Smart Art Press. She has appeared in videos for Quiksilver clothing company.
