= LigoranoReese =

American artist duo

- Born: 1956 (age 69–70), Ligorano; 1955 (age 70–71), Reese; Gettysburg, PA, Ligorano; Washington, D.C., Reese
- Education: Maryland Institute College of Art, Ligorano; Pomona College, Reese
- Known for: Conceptual Art, Ice Sculpture, Installation art, New media art

LigoranoReese is the collaborative name of Nora Ligorano and Marshall Reese, artists who've worked together since the mid-eighties. Their artwork falls within the fields of new technology, ice sculpture, installation art, video art, artists books and limited edition multiples.

== Background ==
Nora Ligorano met Marshall Reese in 1977 while studying painting at the Maryland Institute College of Art in Baltimore. Reese moved to Baltimore in 1977 after a year abroad as a student at Pomona College. From 1978 to 1980, he co-published with Kirby Malone the small press magazine Epod that featured early language poetry and performance scores and began experimenting with visual and sound poetry as a member of CoAccident a collective of poets and musicians. Ligorano and Reese began working collaboratively in that context. In 1982 Ligorano was awarded a Fulbright scholarship in design arts in Spain. Reese moved with Ligorano to Barcelona, where they made their first video art piece, relocating to Madrid the following year. In 1984, Reese moved to New York City to pursue interests in video art. Ligorano joined him one year later in Williamsburg Brooklyn. In New York, both of them continued working in performance art and video expanding into other media including installations, artists books and limited edition multiples.

== Works ==
=== New Technology ===
In 2001, The Kitchen and MIT MediaLab commissioned LigoranoReese to make an interactive installation for the exhibition ID/entity. The artists’ Van Eyck's Mirror is an installation based on the Arnolfini Portrait using video, sensors and computer controls. This was among LigoranoReese's first artworks that incorporated interactive technology.

In 2003 they made In Memory of Truth an installation using a microprojection system designed by the artists and the optical engineer Tony Cappo. The centerpiece of the installation is a magnifying glass on a pedestal with a primary lens that miniaturizes Hollywood war films to fit on the head of a pin. Holland Cotter described the piece “a tour-de-force.” History's Garden 2006 was the next installation using a similar microprojection system. Mounting a prism and lens on a mechanical arm, they replaced the moving counterweight of a metronome with a small projection screen on which images of refugees from Central Europe and the Middle East are projected.

With funding from NYSCA and the Jerome Foundation in 2003 they started research and development on illuminating woven fiber optic thread. From 2003 – 2007 they worked with Eric Singer on developing the hardware. In 2009 while residents at Eyebeam, LigoranoReese met Luke Loeffler and devised programming with him for the fabric to respond to live information from the internet. Calling this body of work “fiber optic data tapestries” the artists completed 50 Different Minds in 2010, which uses Twitter feeds and air flight data to make patterns and colors on its surface.

In 2013 they debuted a new tapestry called I•AM•I at Miami Art Project with Catharine Clark Gallery. I•AM•I is a woven personal data portrait using Fitbit activity and responses to a self-reporting emotional survey to create an abstract portrait of the artists’ subjects. Two of these pieces are in the collections of the University of Wyoming and 21C Museum in Louisville.

Megan Prelinger in her book Inside the Machine: Art and Invention in the Electronic Age notes:

... these characteristics allowed microcircuits to retain a legacy association with textile crafts, an association that has been encouraged in the intervening decades by the networked nature of the electronic systems that now structure everyday life. The twenty-first century textile artists LigoranoReese writing about their electronic tapestries woven of fiber-optic thread, explain their approach to integrating electronics with weaving: 'Weaving is a social activity. It is about threading narratives and mythology, even language and accounting, with (the) quipu. Weaving is a shared tradition common to cultures throughout the world in the same way that computers and networks have flattened the world, making communication and exchange more common.'

=== Temporary Monuments - Ice Sculptures ===
In 2006, on the third anniversary of the Iraq War, the artists installed the word Democracy sculpted from 2000 pounds of ice in the garden of Jim Kempner Fine Art in New York City. They called it The State of Things and photographed and filmed it while it disappeared. This project began a series of public art events LigoranoReese call “temporary monuments.”

In 2008, Provisions Library invited the artists to participate in BrushFire, public art interventions by a number of artists during the campaign season in the Midwest. The artists reprised The State of Things at the conventions in Denver and St. Paul, installing ice sculptures of Democracy in front of the Museum of Contemporary Art Denver on the first day of the Democratic Convention and on the state capital grounds in St. Paul on the first day of the Republican Convention.

In October that same year, the artists installed an ice sculpture of the word Economy on the 79th Anniversary of the Great Depression in front of the New York State Supreme Court Building at Foley Square. In 2010 LigoranoReese made an ice sculpture of the words Middle Class and filmed it disappearing in Kempner's garden called Morning In America. Senator Bernie Sanders featured the time lapse video on his U.S. Senate webpage. In 2012 at the conventions in Tampa and Charlotte, the artists remade the installation in public parks there. The artists installed the ice sculpture Dawn of the Anthropocene in New York City in front of the Flatiron Building as part of the People's Climate March on September 21, 2014. It was a 21-foot long sculpture of the words "The Future" disappeared in 13 hours.

The poet/writer Charles Bernstein writes, “The fundamental feature of LigoranoReese's ice sculptures is that they start out as massive objects, weighing two tons, but by the end of the day they are no more than memories. The sculptures are constantly metamorphosing, changing shape at every moment. In this sense, these works are more lifelike than other kinds of public art, imitating the way life is a constant series of changes.”

=== Installation Art ===
LigoranoReese began making video installations in 1992 often as sculptural objects that incorporate video monitors placed inside other media: newspapers, books and clocks. These sculptures concerned how electronic networks were changing physical media and transforming the act of reading and sharing information.

Johanna Drucker commented on their installation The Corona Palimpsest:

The current tension of the book reflects the present tense of electronic media continuing to come into being. This is not a contrast between the space of the real and the space of the virtual, but between two modes of imaginative life of thought, language, and the eye, each competing to determine the relations of history, language and idea. As the page was once written so the monitor redraws itself.

In 1994 they installed their first public art installation in the windows of the Donnell Library Center. Acid Migration of Culture was a 48 ft x 8 ft photo mural of an open dictionary of cultural terms. Four video monitors displayed statements by artists, politicians and civic leaders on the role of arts in society. Free Speech Zone (2004) at the Brooklyn Public Library Grand Army Plaza Main Branch featured backlit duratrans photos of blind-folded library users and electronic zipper signs of titles and phrases of banned and challenged books. In 2005, they reinstalled it in the windows of the Donnell Library Center.

=== Video Art ===
Single channel video art and videos as elements of sculptures, installations and websites is an ongoing activity of their collaboration. They exhibit these in galleries and festivals.

=== Limited Edition Multiples ===
LigoranoReese began making artists books and limited edition multiples in 1992 with the Bible Belt as an element of a room-size installation with the same name. The edition consisted of a New Testament Bible mounted on a 33-inch belt with a gold-plated Jesus belt buckle. The Bible Belt became the first edition piece of the series the Pure Products of America. In 2001 the edition series became the website pureproductsusa. The Bible Belt was followed with Contract with America underwear in 1995, an edition of cotton underwear briefs with the name of the Republican congressional campaign silkscreened on the waistband, an image of the House Speaker Newt Gingrich on the crotch and the platform of the Contract on the seat. After the artists mailed pairs of the underwear to political leaders in Washington as gifts, they were sued by the Republican National Committee to cease and desist citing trademark infringement. In 2001 LigoranoReese published the W Collection on the anniversary of the Supreme Court decision halting the counting of ballots in Florida. The Collection consisted of a Bush vs Gore dish towel, Money/Honey, and the John Ashcroft snow globe. In 2004 the artists published the postcard book Line Up and sold it in Union Square during the Republican convention in NYC. Line Up depicted the Bush administration cabinet in the form of mug shots. Madness of Art editions published a limited edition set of digital prints acquired by the New York Public Library. LigoranoReese's limited edition art includes mirrors, lenticulars and snow globes.

== Representation ==
LigoranoReese is represented by Catharine Clark Gallery in San Francisco.
