= Alighiero di Bellincione =

Father of Dante Alighieri (c.1210–1283)

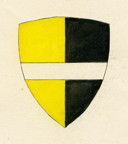
- Coat of Arms
- Born: 1210; Republic of Florence
- Died: 1281–1283 (aged 71–73); Republic of Florence
- Occupation: moneylender
- Political party: Guelph
- Father: Bellincione di Alighiero
- Relatives: Alighiero (grandfather), Dante Alighieri (son)

Alighiero di Bellincione (c. 1210–1283) was a moneylender, member of the Guelph Party and the father of Dante Alighieri.

== Life ==
Alighiero was born around 1210, the son of Bellincione di Alighiero. He was a member of the Guelph party and was probably a moneylender. Alighiero's first wife was Bella and the couple had one child, Dante, in 1265. After Bella's death, Alighiero married his second wife, Lapa Cialuffi, in 1270 or 1271 and they had two children, Francesco and Gaetana (Tana), who were Dante's half-brother and half-sister, respectively. Alighiero died sometime between 1281 and 1283.
