= Julie Heffernan =

American painter (born 1956)

- Born: 1956 (age 69–70); Peoria, Illinois, United States
- Education: University of California, Santa Cruz; Yale University
- Known for: Painting

Julie Heffernan (born 1956 in Peoria, Illinois) is an American painter whose work has been described by the writer Rebecca Solnit as "a new kind of history painting" and by The New Yorker as "ironic rococo surrealism with a social-satirical twist". Heffernan has been a professor of Fine Arts at Montclair State University in Upper Montclair, New Jersey since 1997. She lives in New York, New York.

== Early life ==
Heffernan's family moved when she was five from Illinois and was subsequently raised in the San Francisco Bay Area. She is the youngest of four children.

== Education ==
She received a B.F.A. in Painting and Printmaking at the University of California, Santa Cruz in 1981 and, in 1985, an M.F.A. in Painting at the Yale School of Art.

== Career ==
Heffernan was raised as a Catholic, which influenced the theme of figurative imagery in her works. Her imaginative landscapes feature such elements as exploding cities, castoff gods and garbage, and falling torrents of animals, meteors and gemstones. These elements reflect her view of the world after "calamities" such as Hurricane Katrina and the BP Oil Spill threaten to make it unlivable. Her pieces of artwork have a fantasy like feeling but has a metaphorical meaning behind them talking about issues that are happening around the world during her time she is creating the piece of artwork.

Writing in The New York Sun, art critic David Cohen says of Heffernan's work in a 2007 exhibition: "These paintings are a hybrid of genres and styles, mixing allegory, portraiture, history painting, and still life, while in title they are all presented as self-portraits."

In October 2013, she exhibited eleven paintings in her exhibition Sky is Falling at the P.P.O.W. Gallery, New York City.

She is the recipient of many grants and fellowships including a National Endowment for the Arts grant, a New York Foundation for the Arts grant, a Fulbright-Hayes grant to West Berlin, and several awards from the National Academy Museum.

Heffernan, along with fellow Brooklyn-based artist Virginia Wagner, runs "Painters on Paintings," a blog launched in 2014 for artists to share work that has influenced or inspired them.

Her art pieces have been seen throughout the world. The art work is mainly all throughout the United States but in different countries such as Japan and France.

Heffernan has had 46 solo exhibitions since 1999 and was a nominee for the "Anonymous Was A Woman" award in 2016. Some of her paintings go for the upper tens of thousands of dollars when they are being sold.

In 2023, Hirschl & Adler Modern presented Hoffernan's solo exhibit, The swamps are pink with June.

== Style ==
Heffernan uses the traditional method of oil on canvas to create her works. She derives much of her influence from walking, trees, books, and mind-wandering.

== Personal life ==
She is married to Jonathan Kalb, theater critic and professor in the Theater Department at Hunter College. Heffernan is the mother of two sons: Oliver, the elder, and Sam.
