= Laurel Roth Hope =

American artist and naturalist (born 1973)

Laurel Roth Hope, sometimes known as Laurel Roth (born 1973), is an American artist.

A native of Concord, California, Roth Hope works in San Francisco. Self-taught as both an artist and a naturalist, she has called herself "an artist that wishes she was a scientist", which is reflected in her work. Before turning to art full-time she was a park ranger, and also pursued a career in nature conservation. In her series of "Biodiversity Reclamation Suits" she designed and crocheted costumes for pigeons designed to mimic the feathers and coloration of extinct birds, such as the dodo and the Seychelles parakeet. Roth Hope was among the artists featured in the exhibit 40 Under 40: Craft Futures at the Renwick Gallery of the Smithsonian Museum of American Art, and two of her pieces were subsequently accessioned by the museum.
