= Contrapasso =

Method of infernal punishment

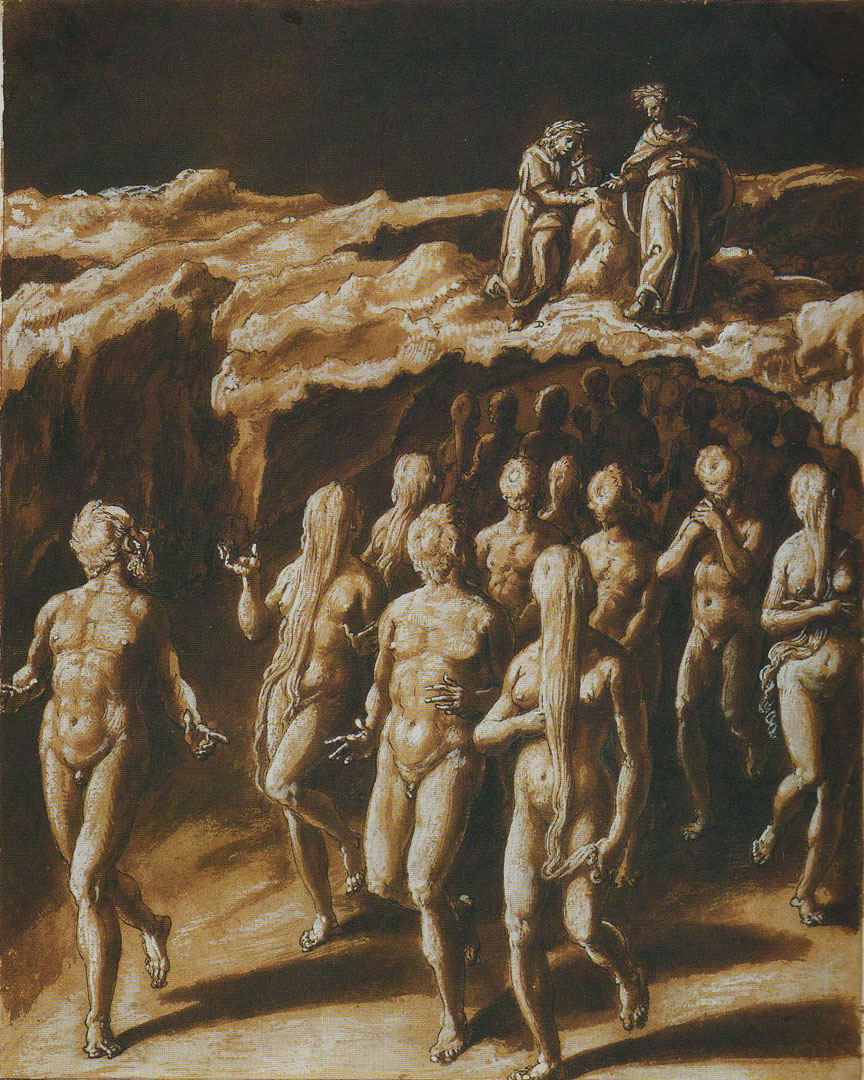
The Contrapasso of the sorcerers, astrologers, and false prophets, illustrated by Stradanus

In Dante's Inferno, contrapasso (or, in modern Italian, contrappasso, from Latin contra and patior, meaning "suffer the opposite") is the punishment of souls "by a process either resembling or contrasting with the sin itself." A similar process occurs in the Purgatorio.

One of the examples of contrapasso occurs in the fourth Bolgia of the eighth circle of Hell, where the sorcerers, astrologers, and false prophets have their heads turned back on their bodies such that it is "necessary to walk backward because they could not see ahead of them." This alludes to the consequences of predicting the future by evil means and displays the twisted nature of magic in general. This example of contrapasso "functions not merely as a form of divine revenge, but rather as the fulfillment of a destiny freely chosen by each soul during his or her life."

The word contrapasso can be found in Inferno, in which the decapitated Bertran de Born declares: Così s'osserva in me lo Contrapasso (XXVIII.142), which was translated by Longfellow as "thus is observed in me the counterpoise", and by Singleton as "thus is the retribution observed in me." Dante believes that De Born is in the ninth Bolgia of schismatics for causing Henry the Young King's rebellion against his father, Henry II of England. De Born is decapitated as a contrapasso for his supposed act of political decapitation in undermining a rightful head of the state.

Dante inherited the idea of "contrapasso" from various theological and literary sources. These include Thomas Aquinas' Summa Theologica as well as medieval ‘visions’ such as the Visio Pauli, Visio Alberici, and Visio Tnugdali.

== See also ==
- Naraka, in Indian religions where punishments resemble sins committed in life
- "A Nice Place to Visit", an episode of The Twilight Zone with a similar theme where a robber dies and enters an afterlife where all his wishes for material goods are instantly satisfied at a whim.
