= Fra Alberigo =

Italian from Faenza

Friar Alberigo (also spelled Frate Alberigo; died c. 1307) was a 13th-century Italian nobleman from Faenza, known for his betrayal of guests, an act which led to his literary damnation in Dante Alighieri's Divine Comedy. He belonged to the Guelph Manfredi family, a prominent political and military dynasty in Romagna.

== Biography ==
Alberigo was born into the Manfredi family, a powerful Guelph faction in Faenza. In 1274, due to the political conflicts between the Guelphs and the Ghibellines, the Manfredis were exiled from the city by their rivals, the Accarisi family. They returned to power in 1280, allegedly with the help of Tebaldello del Zambrasi, a Ghibelline who betrayed his own faction by allowing the Guelphs to reenter Faenza during the night.

At some point in his later life, Alberigo is believed to have entered the Knights of the Jovial Friars (Frati Gaudenti), a religious-military order that had a reputation for corruption and hypocrisy. Despite the religious guise, many members of the order were politically ambitious and morally questionable.

== Betrayal and Infamy ==
Friar Alberigo is most infamously remembered for an incident in which he ordered the murder of his own brother, Manfred, and his nephew during a banquet at his house. According to tradition, he gave the signal for their assassination by requesting that fruit be served—specifically figs—which had been prearranged as the cue for the killers to strike. This treacherous act earned him a place among the damned in Dante’s Inferno.

== In Dante’s Divine Comedy ==
Friar Alberigo appears in Inferno, Canto XXXIII, of Dante Alighieri’s Divine Comedy. He is found in the third ring of the ninth circle of Hell, known as Ptolomea, which punishes those who betrayed guests or allies under the guise of friendship. In Dante's moral universe, this is one of the gravest sins, and such traitors are condemned to eternal punishment in a frozen lake (Cocytus).

Notably, Dante’s fictional Alberigo claims that his soul is already in Hell while his body still lives on Earth, being inhabited by a demon—an idea Dante uses to emphasize the severity of betrayal. Alberigo bitterly comments that he is paid in “dates” for the “figs” he served, a metaphorical way of saying he is punished far more severely than the crime he committed might initially suggest.

== Legacy ==
While little is known about the historical Alberigo beyond the literary and anecdotal accounts, his portrayal in Dante's Inferno has cemented his place in the canon of medieval Italian literature as a symbol of treachery and false piety. His story is often cited as an example of the tensions between family loyalty, political ambition, and personal morality in late medieval Italy.

== Bibliography ==
Alighieri, Dante; Ciardi, John (trans.). The Inferno. New York: The New American Library, Inc., 1954. ISBN 978-1-101-07517-3, locations 4114–20.

Lansing, Richard (ed.). The Dante Encyclopedia. New York: Garland, 2000. ISBN 0-8153-1659-3, p. 10.

Toynbee, Paget. A Dictionary of Proper Names and Notable Matters in the Works of Dante. Oxford: Clarendon Press, 1898.

== See also ==
Divine Comedy

Inferno (Dante)

Guelphs and Ghibellines
