= Ellen Kooi =

Dutch artist and photographer

Ellen Kooi (born November 7, 1962, in Leeuwarden), is a Dutch artist and photographer, who lives and works in Haarlem, Netherlands. She makes scenographic, theatrical imagery merging landscapes and figures–in the tradition of the city's landscape painters from the Dutch Golden Age.

== Biography ==
Kooi graduated from the Academie Minerva, in Groningen, in 1987; she was an artist in residency, and completed post-graduate studies, at the Rijksacademie van Beeldende Kunsten, in Amsterdam, from 1993 to 1994. Within her body of work, themes of humans' intimate interactions with their surrounding natural world are explored. From unsettling landscapes, often populated only by young adults; to reassuring scenes of soothing serenity, and shelter; and serendipitous escapes; her subjects–nature and actor–are dramatically staged. Her work has been acquired by the Frans Hals Museum, the Fries Museum, and the Dutch Ministry of Foreign Affairs, all in the Netherlands, as well as the Collection Hermès, in Luxembourg, and the Borusan Contemporary, in Turkey.

She is represented by Torch Gallery, in Amsterdam.

== Solo exhibitions ==
2015

- Undertones, at Musée de La Roche-sur-Yon, la Roche-sur-Yon, France
- Docks Art Fair Lyon, Gallerie Les Filles Du Calvaire

2014

- Undertones, solo show at Centro de Arte Alcobendas (CAA), Madrid, Spain
- AIPAD Photography Show (PPOW Gallery), New York
- As it Happens, Galerie Les Filles Du Calvaire, Paris, France

2013

- Sables Mouvants, Lambertart, Le Fort de Mons-en-Baroeul, Lille, France

2012

- Transparent Days, Camara Oscura, Madrid, Spain
- Next to Me, Torch Gallery, Amsterdam, Netherlands
- Recent Photography, Catharine Clark Gallery, San Francisco, United States
- Luz Holandesa, Espacio Liquido, Gijon, Spain

2011

- Out of Sight, PPOW Gallery, New York City
- Ellen Kooi: Out of Sight, Le Château d’Eau, Toulouse, France
- On the Other Side of Twilight, duo-show with Astrid Kruse Jensen, Stedelijk Museum Den Bosch, Netherlands

2010

- Out of Sight/Hors de Vue, Institut Néerlandais, Paris, France
- Ellen Kooi, Photographies, Le centre Image/ Imatge, Orthez, France

2009

- "Borrowed Landscapes", part of Festival Off PhotoEspaña, Gallery Camara Oscura, Madrid, Spain
- Fotowerken, de Willem III, Vlissingen, Netherlands
- Recent Work, Torch Gallery, Amsterdam, Netherlands

2008

- "Dentro por Fuera, Within from Without", soloshow, La Casa Encendida, Madrid, Spain
- Recent Photography, Espacio Liquido, Gijon, Spain

2006

- Travaux Recents, duo show with Hans Op De Beeck, Les Filles du Calvaire, Paris, France

2005

- Hold Still, Keep Moving IV, Gallery Beaumontpublic, Luxemburg, Luxemburg
