= Sandow Birk =

American visual artist from Los Angeles

Sandow Birk (born 1962 in Detroit) is an American visual artist from Los Angeles whose work deals mainly with contemporary American culture. Eight books have been published on his works and he has made two films. With an emphasis on social issues, his frequent themes have included inner city violence, graffiti, various political issues, travel, prisons, surfing and skateboarding.

His projects are often elaborate and epic in scale, including a series on "The Leading Causes of Death in America" and the invasion and the second war in Iraq. He completed a hand-made illuminated manuscript version of the Qur'an, transcribing the English language text by hand in a personalized font based on graffiti, and illuminating the pages with scenes of contemporary American life.

== Career ==
Birk is a graduate of Otis Art Institute of Parsons School of Design (now Otis College of Art and Design) in Los Angeles. His studies included a semester in Paris at the American College, Paris and Parsons School of Design, as well as a semester at the Bath Academy of Art in England. Further studies included time at the Museu de Arte Moderna de São Paulo and Parque Lage in Rio de Janeiro, Brazil.

In 2000, Birk exhibited a pseudo-historical series entitled "In Smog and Thunder”, describing a "Great War of the Californias" in which Los Angeles and San Francisco wage all-out war for control of California, at the Laguna Art Museum. The series imagined a civil war between Los Angeles ("Smog Town") and San Francisco ("Fog Town"), and included some 200 drawings, maps, installations, models, and paintings with such titles as "The Great Battle of Los Angeles". A book was published on the project, "In Smog and Thunder", and a faux documentary film about the war was made with the same name and directed by Sean Meredith, with voice over work by Paul Zaloom.

His series of landscape paintings of California's 33 state prisons was exhibited at the Santa Barbara Contemporary Arts Forum in 2001. A book was published on the project, entitled Incarcerated: Visions of California in the 21st Century. In 2002, Birk expanded this project by depicting all of New York State's maximum security prisons in the style of Hudson River School artists from the 19th century. The project was exhibited in New York at Debs and Co. Gallery and works from the series are included in the collection of the New York Historical Society.

In 2005, Birk collaborated with writer Marcus Sanders on a rewriting and illustrating of Dante's Divine Comedy, in which Dante and Virgil wander among the souls of the afterworld and discuss faith and philosophy with historical figures. The 14th century poem was translated into contemporary American English by Sanders, while Birk provided illustrations that adapt Gustave Dore's classic illustrations into 21st century imagery. Birk's illustrations were exhibited at the San Jose Museum of Art in 2005 and traveled to several institutions. The work was later published in three volumes.

A feature film adaptation of the Dante project entitled Dante's Inferno was made by Birk and Sanders in collaboration with others. Starring the voices of Dermot Mulroney and James Cromwell as Dante and Virgil respectively, the film was featured at film festivals across the United States in 2007.

In September 2009, the Catharine Clark Gallery showed American Qur'an, an exhibition of fifteen suras of the Qur'an that Birk inscribed in English and decorated with contemporary American scenes. The project was expanded and exhibited in several institutions, including the Koplin del Rio Gallery in Los Angeles, P.P.O.W Gallery in New York City, and The Andy Warhol Museum in Pittsburgh. The exhibition from the Warhol later traveled to several institutions, including Grinell College in Grinell, Iowa.

Birk spent three months in Auckland, New Zealand, in 2018, as Artist in Residence at Auckland Print Studio, where he completed a series of lithographic prints entitled "Trumpagruel". The works were loosely based on Gustave Dore's series of prints for "Gargantua and Pantagruel", and featured caricatures of then President Trump, surrounded by lackeys. The works were exhibited in New York at P.P.O.W Gallery, and the collection was purchased by the Art Gallery of Ontario for its permanent collection, where it was shown in the exhibition "Political Satire throughout History".

During the COVID-19 pandemic, Birk completed as series of some 30 small marine paintings as metaphors for disease and contagion, and the paintings were shown at the Catharine Clark Gallery in San Francisco and at the Koplin Deo Rio Gallery in Seattle.

Arion Press of San Francisco published an edition of AA Milne's book "House at Pooh Corner" in 2024, with more than 60 illustrations by Birk. Entitled "Pooh", the book ran with a limited edition of 300 copies. Birk's illustrations imagined the that Christopher Robin, rather than being a 5 year old boy, is now an aging, unhoused person on the streets of an unnamed American city. The images depict both the characters from the original story as well as glimpses of Christopher Robin's life as an old man. The book ends with him in a hospital bed, his hand resting on a stuffed bear.

== Published titles ==
Published works including Birk's art:

- Sandow Birk's "In Smog and Thunder: Historical works from The Great War of the Californias" / curated by Tyler Stallings, (Laguna Beach, Calif.: Laguna Art Museum, c. 2000). ISBN 0-86719-497-9
- Incarcerated: visions of California in the 21st century: paintings and prints from the Prisonation series / by Sandow Birk, (Santa Barbara, CA: Santa Barbara Contemporary Arts Forum; San Francisco, CA : Last Gasp, c. 2001). ISBN 0-86719-534-7 (pbk.)
- Dante’s Paradiso / illustrated by Sandow Birk; text adapted by Sandow Birk and Marcus Sanders; preface by Peter S. Hawkins; foreword by Mary Campbell; introduction by Michael F. Meister, (San Francisco: Chronicle Books, c. 2005). ISBN 0-8118-4720-9
- Dante’s Purgatorio / illustrated by Sandow Birk; text adapted by Sandow Birk and Marcus Sanders; preface by Marcia Tanner; introduction by Michael F. Meister, (San Francisco, CA: Chronicle Books, c. 2005). ISBN 0-8118-4719-5 (pbk.)
- Dante’s Inferno / illustrated by Sandow Birk; text adapted by Sandow Birk and Marcus Sanders. Inferno. English, (San Francisco: Chronicle Books, c. 2004). ISBN 0-8118-4213-4 (pbk.)
- The Depravities of War / woodblock prints by Sandow Birk, with prefaces by Darius Spieth and Marilyn Vierra; afterword by Graham Larkin. (Santa Ana, CA: Grand Central Press, c. 2007) ISBN 0-9771696-9-3. copied from В. Волков. Минск 3 июля 1944 года (V.Volkov. Minsk. July 3, 1944).
- American Qur'an / artworks by Sandow Birk, Foreword by Reza Aslan, introduction by Zareen Grewal, afterword by Iftikhar Dadi (New York, NY: Liveright Publishing, c. 2015) ISBN 978-1-63149-018-7
- "Pooh - Stories by A.A.Milne" / illustrated by Sandow Birk. Limited edition book. Published by Arion Press, San Francisco. 2024.
