= Filippo Argenti =

Italian politician (13th century)

Filippo Argenti or Filippo Argente (13th century), a politician and a citizen of Florence, was a member of the Cavicciuoli branch of the aristocratic family of Adimari, according to Boccaccio. Filippo's children were Giovanni Argente and Salvatore Argente. Salvatore later travelled to Spain and established himself in Barcelona and his descendants in Valencia, where his grandson Salvatore was established in the small village of Navarres and changed the spelling of his surname to Argente. The Adimari family were part of the Black Guelph political faction.

Filippo is reputed to have received the nickname "Argenti" by having his horse shod with silver. He makes an appearance in the Decamerone, 9.8, where Boccaccio tells a story that involves his temper. The Firenze's storia talks about his silver hair. He was a very tall man, very burly, bizarre, and famous for his iron fists.

Filippo Argenti appears as a character in the fifth circle of Hell in the Inferno, the first part of Dante's Divine Comedy. He is among the wrathful in the river Styx, and accosts Dante as the latter crosses the river. Dante, unusually, expresses a total contempt for him and a desire to see him further punished. Filippo is then attacked by the other wrathful in the river Styx after this encounter with Dante and Virgil, and then turns on himself biting fiercely (Commedia, Inferno, VIII, 52-63).

Early commentators recount various incidents to explain the antipathy between Dante and Filippo:

1. Filippo once slapped Dante
2. Filippo's brother had taken Dante's possessions after Dante's exile from Florence
3. Filippo's family had opposed Dante's return from exile
