= Phlegethon =

Mythological river of Hades (Greece)

In Greek mythology, the river Phlegethon (Ancient Greek: Φλεγέθων, lit. 'flaming') or Pyriphlegethon (Πυριφλεγέθων, 'fire-flaming') is one of the five rivers in the infernal regions of the underworld, along with the rivers Styx, Lethe, Cocytus, and Acheron.

== Mythology ==
According to Homer's Odyssey, the Phlegethon feeds into the river Acheron, alongside the Cocytus. Plato describes it as "a stream of fire, which coils round the earth and flows into the depths of Tartarus".

In Orphic literature, in which there are four rivers of the underworld, the Phlegethon is associated with the element of fire, and the direction east.

In Oedipus by Seneca the Younger, the first singing of the chorus, which mainly describes the plague that has settled in Thebes, includes the line, "Phlegethon has changed his course and mingled Styx with Theban streams." While this is not essential to the plot of the play, the line figuratively serves to suggest Death has become physically present in Thebes.

== The Divine Comedy ==
In Dante's Inferno, which is the first part of The Divine Comedy, Phlegethon is described as a river of blood that boils souls. It is in the Seventh Circle of Hell, which punishes those who committed crimes of violence against their fellow men (see Canto XII, 46–48); murderers, tyrants, and the like. By causing hot blood to flow through their violent deeds in life, they are now sunk in the flowing, boiling blood of the Phlegethon. The depth at which each sinner must stand in the river is determined by the level of violence they caused in life; Dante sees Attila the Hun and Alexander the Great up to their eyebrows. Centaurs patrol the circle, firing arrows at those who try to rise above their allotted level in the river. Dante and Virgil cross Phlegethon with help from Nessus.
