= Cocytus =

River in Greek mythology

Cocytus /koʊˈsaɪtəs/ or Kokytos /koʊˈkaɪtəs/ (Ancient Greek: Κωκυτός, literally "lamentation") is a river in ancient Greek religion and mythology. Together with the Styx, Phlegethon, Lethe and Acheron, it is one of the five rivers of Hades, the Greek underworld and abode of the dead.

== In literature ==
The Cocytus river was one of the rivers that surrounded Hades. Cocytus, along with the other rivers related to the underworld, was a common topic for ancient authors. Of the ancient authors, Cocytus was mentioned by Virgil, Homer, Cicero, Aeschylus, Apuleius and Plato, among others.

Cocytus also makes an appearance in John Milton's epic poem Paradise Lost. In Book Two, Milton speaks of "Cocytus, named of lamentation loud / Heard on the rueful stream".

Cocytus also appears in Friedrich Schiller's poem "Gruppe aus dem Tartarus": ...Hohl sind ihre Augen—ihre Blicke/ Spähen bang nach des Cocytus Brücke... (...Hollow are their eyes, their looks / Peering anxiously to the bridge of Cocytus...)

The river is also mentioned in Rafael Sabatini's novel Captain Blood: His Odyssey, when Colonel Bishop's nemesis, Peter Blood, addresses him as follows: "And now, ye greasy hangman, step out as brisk and lively as ye can, and behave as naturally as ye may, or it's the black stream of Cocytus ye'll be contemplating."

=== In the Divine Comedy ===
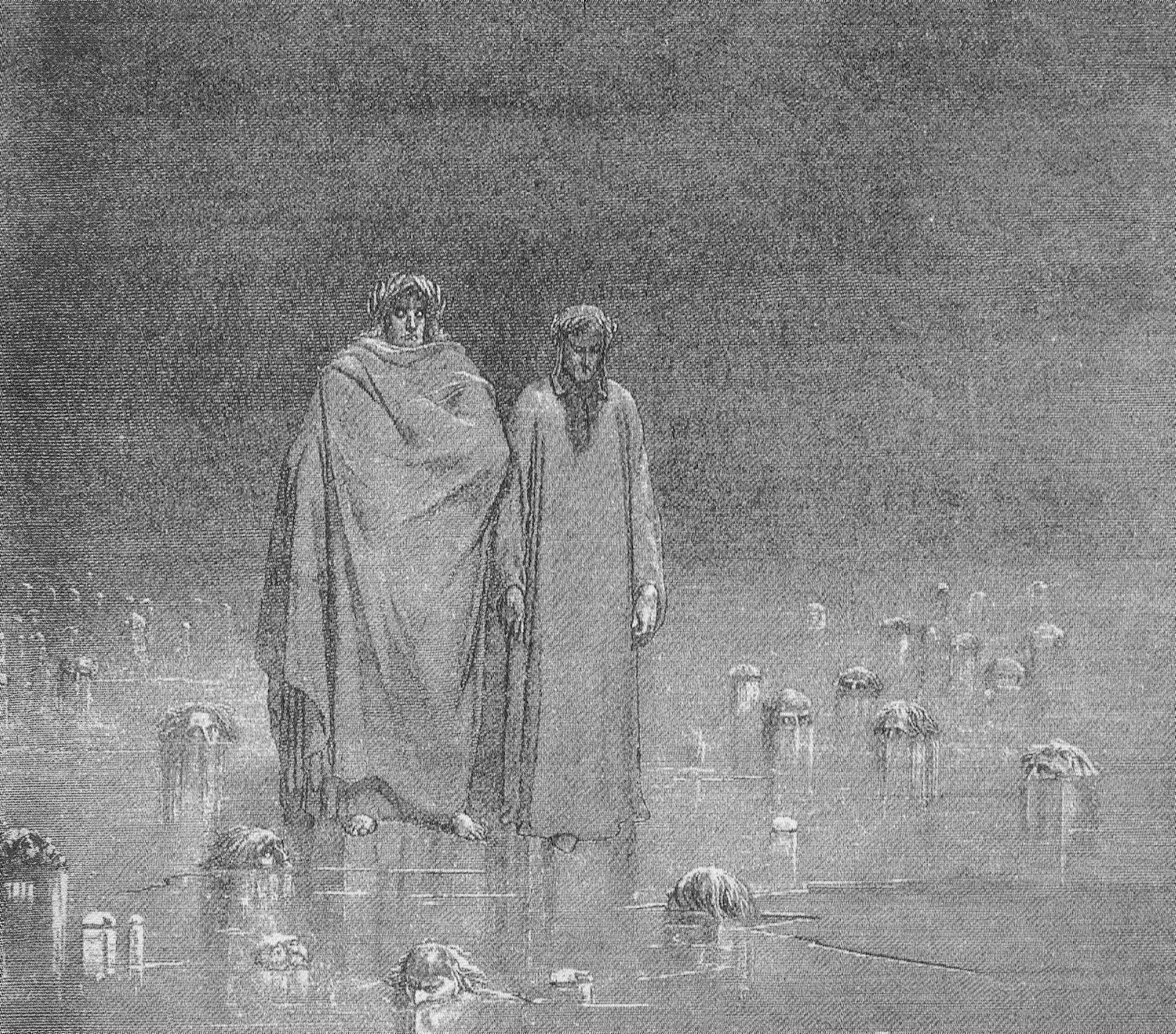
Dante's Cocytus, as illustrated by Gustave Doré (1832–1883)

In Inferno, the first cantica of Dante's Divine Comedy, Cocytus (or Treachery) is the ninth and lowest circle of Hell. Dante and Virgil are placed there by the giant Antaeus. There are other Giants around the rim that are chained; however Antaeus is unchained as he died before the Gigantomachy. Cocytus is referred to as a frozen lake rather than a river, although it originates from the same source as the other infernal rivers, the tears of a statue located in Mount Ida called The Old Man of Crete which represents the sins of humanity. The statue has a golden head, a silver chest and arms, a torso and thighs made of bronze, legs made of iron, and a right foot made of baked clay. Dante describes Cocytus as being the home of traitors and those who committed acts of complex fraud. Depending on the form of their treachery, inhabitants are buried in ice to a varying degree, anywhere from neck-high to completely submerged in ice. Cocytus is divided into four descending "rounds", or sections:

- Caina, after the Biblical Cain; traitors to blood relatives. Sinners are frozen up to their necks, allowing them to bend their heads to evade icy winds.
- Antenora, after Antenor from the Iliad; traitors to country. Sinners are frozen up to their heads, so they cannot evade icy winds unlike the sinners in Caina.
- Ptolomea, after Ptolemy, governor of Jericho, who murdered his guests (1 Maccabees); traitors to guests. Sinners lie supine in the ice with their tears completely frozen in their eye sockets so they cannot cry. Here it is said that sometimes the soul of a traitor falls to Hell before Atropos cuts the thread, and their body is taken over by a fiend.
- Judecca, after Judas Iscariot; traitors to masters and benefactors. Sinners are encased completely in ice, contorted into all sorts of different shapes.

Dante's Satan is at the center of the circle buried waist-high in ice. He is depicted with three faces and mouths. The central mouth gnaws Judas. Judas is chewed head foremost with his feet protruding and Satan's claws tearing his back while those gnawed in the side mouths, Brutus and Cassius, leading assassins of Julius Caesar, are both chewed feet foremost with their heads protruding. Under each chin, Satan flaps a pair of wings, which only serve to increase the cold winds in Cocytus and further imprison him and other traitors. Dante and his guide Virgil proceed then to climb down Satan's back and then upwards towards Purgatory. Though Dante is initially confused as to why they are turning round, Virgil explains it is due to the change in forces as they pass through the center of the Earth.
