= List of horror games =

Horror video games narratively deal with elements of horror fiction and comprise a variety of video game genres.

== List ==
Title	Genre	Developer, publisher	Platform	Release date	Notes
The 7th Guest	Interactive movie, Adventure, puzzle supernatural	Trilobyte	MS-DOS, Windows, CD-i, OS X, iOS	1993-04	
The 11th Hour	Adventure, puzzle, supernatural	Trilobyte	MS-DOS, Windows, Macintosh	1995-12-13	
The Backrooms: 1998	survival game, psychological horror	Steelkrill Studio	Windows, OS X, Browser	2022-05-26	
1916: Der Unbekannte Krieg	First-person shooter, psychological horror	DADIU Team 2	Windows, OS X, Browser	2011-03-28	
2Dark	Survival horror	Gloomywood	Windows, PlayStation 4, Xbox One	2017-03-10	
3D Monster Maze	Adventure	Malcolm Evans	ZX81	1982-12	
7 Days to Die	Survival, open world	The Fun Pimps	Windows	2013-12-13	
Afterfall: Insanity	Post-apocalyptic, survival horror	Intoxicate Studios	Windows	2011	
Alien	Adventure, strategy	Argus Press Software Ltd.	Commodore 64	1984	
Aliens: The Computer Game	First-person shooter	Software Studios	Commodore 64	1986	
Aliens	Shoot 'em up	Konami	Arcade	1990	
Alien³	Shoot 'em up, platform	Bits Studios (Game Boy), Spearsoft (SNES), Probe Software	Amiga, Commodore 64, Game Boy, NES, Master System, SNES, Sega Genesis	1993	
Alien³ - The Gun	Rail shooter	Sega	Arcade	1993	
Alien Trilogy	First-person shooter	Probe Entertainment	PlayStation Saturn DOS	1996	
Alien vs Predator	First-person shooter	Rebellion Developments	Atari Jaguar	1994-08-21	
Aliens Versus Predator	First-person shooter	Rebellion Developments	Windows	1999-04-30	
Aliens Versus Predator 2	First-person shooter	Monolith Productions	Windows	2001-10-22	
Aliens vs Predator	First-person shooter	Rebellion Developments	Windows, PlayStation 3, Xbox 360	2010-02-16	
Alien: Resurrection	First-person shooter	Argonaut Software	PlayStation	2000-10-10	
Alien: Isolation	Survival horror, action-adventure, stealth, first-person shooter, science fiction	The Creative Assembly	Windows, PlayStation 3, PlayStation 4, Xbox One, Xbox 360, Nintendo Switch	2014-10-07	
Alien: Blackout	Puzzle	D3 Go!	iOS	2019-01-24	
Alien Breed	Run and gun, top-down shooter	Team17	Amiga	1991	
Alien Breed II: The Horror Continues	Run and gun, top-down shooter	Team17	Amiga	1993	
Alien Breed: Tower Assault	Run and gun, top-down shooter, open world	Team17	Amiga	1994	
Alien Syndrome	Run and gun	Sega	Arcade	1987	
Alien Syndrome	Run and gun, action role-playing	Totally Games	PlayStation Portable, Wii	2007	
Akai Ito	Adventure	Success Corporation	PlayStation 2	2004-10-21	
Alan Wake	Action horror, third-person shooter, psychological horror	Remedy Entertainment	Windows, Xbox 360	2010-05-14	
Alan Wake's American Nightmare	Third-person shooter	Remedy Entertainment	Windows, Xbox 360	2012-02-21	
Alan Wake 2	Psychological horror, survival horror	Remedy Entertainment	PlayStation 5, Windows, Xbox Series X/S	2023-10-27	
American McGee's Alice	Action-adventure	Rogue Entertainment	Windows, OS X, Xbox 360, PlayStation 3	2000-12-05	
Alone in the Dark	Survival horror, action adventure, cosmic horror	Infogrames	MS-DOS, PC-98, FM Towns, 3DO, OS X, RISC OS, iOS	1992	
Alone in the Dark 2	Survival horror, action adventure	Infogrames	MS-DOS, PC-98, FM Towns, 3DO, OS X, Sega Saturn, PlayStation	1993	
Alone in the Dark 3	Survival horror, action adventure	Infogrames	MS-DOS, PC-98, Windows 95, OS X	1994	
Alone in the Dark: The New Nightmare	Survival horror, action adventure, cosmic horror	Darkworks	PlayStation, Game Boy Color, Windows, Dreamcast, PlayStation 2	2001-05-18	
Alone in the Dark	Survival horror, action adventure, first-person shooter	Eden Games	Windows, PlayStation 3, PlayStation 2, Wii, Xbox 360	2008-06-20	
Alone in the Dark: Illumination	Survival horror, third-person shooter	Pure FPS	Windows	2015-06-11	
Alone in the Dark	Survival horror	Pieces Interactive	Windows, Xbox Series X/S, PlayStation 5	2024-03-20	
Amanda the Adventurer	Analog horror, Escape room	DreadXP, MANGLEDmaw Games	PlayStation 5, Nintendo Switch, PlayStation 4, Xbox Series X and Series S, Xbox One, Microsoft Windows	2023-04-25	
Amnesia: The Dark Descent	Adventure, psychological horror, cosmic horror	Frictional Games	Linux, OS X, Windows	2010-09-22	
Amnesia: A Machine for Pigs	Adventure, psychological horror, cosmic horror	The Chinese Room	Linux, OS X, Windows	2013-09-10	
Amnesia: Rebirth	Adventure, psychological horror, cosmic horror, survival horror	Frictional Games	Linux, Windows, PlayStation 4	2020-10-20	
Amnesia: The Bunker	Survival horror, immersive sim, psychological horror	Frictional Games	PlayStation 4, Windows, Xbox One, Xbox Series X/S	2023-06-06	
Akolyta	Adventure	Pterosoft studio	Linux, OS X, Windows	TBA	
Among the Sleep	Adventure, psychological horror	Krillbite Studio	Linux, OS X, Windows, PlayStation 4	2014-05-29	
Amy	Survival horror, stealth	VectorCell	PlayStation 3, Xbox 360	2012-01-11	
Anatomy	Horror game	Kitty Horrorshow	Windows, macOS, Linux	2016	
Anchorhead	Interactive fiction, cosmic horror	Michael S. Gentry	MS-DOS	1998	
Anna	Adventure, puzzle	Dreampainters Software	Windows, PlayStation 3, Xbox 360	2012	
Anthology of the Killer	Horror game, Walking simulator	Stephen Gillmurphy	Windows, macOS, Linux	2024-05-28	
Area 51	First-person shooter	Midway Austin	Windows, PlayStation 2, Xbox	2005-05-25	
Araya	Adventure	MAD Virtual Reality Studio	Windows	2016-11-24	
Asylum	Adventure	Med Systems	TRS-80, Apple II	1981	
Atic Atac	Adventure	Tim and Chris Stamper	ZX Spectrum, BBC Micro	1983	
Atomic Heart	First-person shooter, alternate history	Mundfish	Windows	2023-02-21	
Ao Oni	Adventure	noprops	Windows	2008-11	
Bad Day on the Midway	Adventure, puzzle	inSCAPE	Windows, Mac	1995-10-31	
Bad Mojo	Adventure, puzzle	Pulse Entertainment	Windows	1996	
Baldi's Basics in Education and Learning	Survival horror, educational, parody	Basically, Games!	Windows, macOS, Linux, Android, iOS	2018	
Baldi's Basics Plus	Survival horror, Parody, Roguelike	Basically, Games!	Windows, Linux, macOS	2020-06-11	
Barotrauma	Survival horror, role-playing	Undertow Games, FakeFish Games	Windows, macOS, Linux	2023	
Barrow Hill: Curse of the Ancient Circle	Adventure, puzzle	Shadow Tor Studios	Windows	2006-04-16	
Bendy and the Ink Machine	Survival horror, action adventure	Joey Drew Studios	Windows, OS X, Linux	2017-02-10	
Bendy and the Dark Revival	Survival horror, action adventure	Joey Drew Studios	Windows	2022-11-15	
Bible Black	Visual novel	Eroge, ActiveSoft	Windows	2000-07-14	
BioForge	Action-adventure, science fiction	Origin Systems	Windows, MS-MS-DOS	1995	
BioShock	First-person shooter, Immersive sim, science fiction	Irrational Games	Windows, Xbox 360, PlayStation 3, OS X, iOS	2007	
BioShock 2	First-person shooter, immersive sim	2K Marin	PlayStation 3, Windows, Xbox 360, macOS	2010	
The Blackout Club	Horror game	Question	Windows	2018-10-30	
BlackSoul	Survival horror	XeniosVision	Windows	2013	
The Black Mirror I: Death's Messenger	Point-and-click	Future Games	Windows	2003-02	
The Black Mirror II: Reigning Evil	Point-and-click	Cranberry Production GmbH	Windows	2009	
The Black Mirror III: Final Fear	Point-and-click	Cranberry Production GmbH	Windows	2011	
Black Souls I	Adventure, eroge, psychological horror	Eeny, meeny, miny, moe?	Windows	2017-7-30	
Black Souls II	Adventure, eroge, psychological horror	Eeny, meeny, miny, moe?	Windows	2018-11-10	
Blair Witch Volume 1: Rustin Parr	Survival horror, action adventure, psychological horror	Terminal Reality	Windows	2000-10-03	
Blair Witch Volume 2: The Legend of Coffin Rock	Survival horror, action adventure, psychological horror	Human Head Studios	Windows	2000-10-25	
Blair Witch Volume 3: The Elly Kedward Tale	Survival horror, action adventure, psychological horror	Ritual Entertainment	Windows	2000-11-21	
Blair Witch	Walking simulator	Bloober Team	Windows	2019-08-30	
Blood	First-person shooter	3D Realms, Monolith Productions	MS-DOS	1997-06-20	
Blood II: The Chosen	First-person shooter	Monolith Productions	PC, Windows	1998-10-31	
Bloodborne	Action role-playing, survival horror, cosmic horror	FromSoftware	PlayStation 4	2015-03-24	
BloodRayne	Action-adventure, hack and slash	Terminal Reality	Windows, OS X, GameCube, PlayStation 2, Xbox	2002-10-15	
BloodRayne 2	Action-adventure, hack and slash	Terminal Reality	Windows, PlayStation 2, Xbox	2004-10-12	
BloodRayne: Betrayal	Action game, hack and slash, platform	WayForward Technologies, Abstraction Games	Windows, PlayStation 3, Xbox 360	2011-09-06	
Blue Stinger	Survival horror, action adventure	Climax Graphics	Dreamcast	1999-03-25	
Bramble: The Mountain King	Platform, adventure, folk horror	Dimfrost Studio	Nintendo Switch, PlayStation 5, Windows, Xbox Series X/S	2023-04-27	
Buckshot Roulette	Gambling, Tabletop horror, Strategy	Mike Klubnika	Windows, Linux	2023-12-28	
Buffy the Vampire Slayer	Beat 'em up	The Collective	Xbox	2002-08-18	
Bye Sweet Carole	Survival horror, Puzzle-platformer	Little Sewing Machine	PlayStation 5, Microsoft Windows, Nintendo Switch, Xbox Series X/S	2025-10-09	
Call of Cthulhu	Survival horror, action role-playing, cosmic horror, psychological horror	Cyanide Studio	Windows, PlayStation 4, Xbox One, Nintendo Switch	2018-10-30	
Call of Cthulhu: Dark Corners of the Earth	Survival horror, first-person shooter, cosmic horror, psychological horror	Headfirst Productions	Xbox, Windows	2005-10-24	
Calling	Survival horror	Hudson Soft	Wii	2009-11-19	
The Callisto Protocol	Survival horror	Striking Distance Studios	Windows, PlayStation 5, Xbox Series X/S	2022-12-02	
Carrier	Survival horror	Jaleco	Dreamcast	2000-01-31	
Carrion	Reverse horror	Phobia Game Studio	PlayStation 4, Xbox One, Windows, Linux, OS X	2020	
The Casting of Frank Stone	Interactive drama, survival horror	Supermassive Games	PlayStation 5, Windows, Xbox Series X/S	2024-09-03	
Castlevania	Action-adventure, hack and slash, platform, Gothic horror	Konami	Family Computer Disk System, Nintendo Entertainment System, PlayChoice-10, Commodore 64, Amiga, MS-DOS, Windows, Game Boy Advance, AT&T Wireless mMode Network, Virtual Console	1986-09-26	
Castlevania II: Simon's Quest	Action-adventure, hack and slash, platform, Gothic horror	Konami	Family Computer Disk System, Nintendo Entertainment System	1987-06-28	
Castlevania III: Dracula's Curse	Action-adventure, hack and slash, platform, Gothic horror	Konami	Family Computer Disk System, Nintendo Entertainment System	1989-12-22	
Castlevania: The Adventure	Action-adventure, hack and slash, platform, Gothic horror	Konami	Game Boy, Game Boy Color	1989-12-15	
Super Castlevania IV	Action-adventure, hack and slash, platform, Gothic horror	Konami	Super Nintendo Entertainment System	1991-10-31	
Castlevania 64	Action-adventure, hack and slash, Gothic horror	Konami	Nintendo 64	1999-06-26	
Castlevania: Legacy of Darkness	Action-adventure, hack and slash, Gothic horror	Konami	Nintendo 64	1999-11-30	
The Cat Lady	Adventure	Harvester Games	Windows, Linux	2012-12-07	
Chakan: The Forever Man	Action game, platform	Extended Play Productions	Sega Genesis, Game Gear	1992	
Chaos Break	Survival horror, Third-person shooter	EON Digital Entertainment	PlayStation	2000-01-27	
The Charnel House Trilogy	Adventure	Owl Cave	Windows	2015	
Chiller	Light gun shooter	Exidy	Arcade, Nintendo Entertainment System	1986	
Choo-Choo Charles	Survival horror	Two Star Games	Windows, PlayStation 4, PlayStation 5, Xbox One, Xbox Series X/S, Nintendo Switch	2022-12-09	
Clive Barker's Hellraiser: Revival	Survival horror	Saber Interactive, Boss Team Games	PlayStation 5, Windows, Xbox Series X/S	TBA	
Clive Barker's Jericho	First-person shooter, action game	MercurySteam	Windows, PlayStation 3, Xbox 360	2007-10-23	
Clive Barker's Undying	First-person shooter, adventure, cosmic horror	DreamWorks Interactive, Westlake Interactive	Windows, OS X	2001-02-07	
Clock Tower	Point-and-click adventure, adventure, stealth	Human Entertainment	Super Famicom, Windows, PlayStation, Wonderswan	1995-09-14	
Clock Tower II	Survival horror, point-and-click adventure, stealth	Human Entertainment, ASCII Entertainment	PlayStation	1996-12-13	
Clock Tower II: The Struggle Within	Survival horror, point-and-click adventure, stealth	Human Entertainment, Agetec Inc.	PlayStation	1998-03-12	
Clock Tower 3	Survival horror	Capcom Production Studio 3, Sunsoft	PlayStation 2	2002-12-12	
Cold Fear	Survival horror, Third-person shooter, Body horror	Darkworks	Windows, PlayStation 2, Xbox	2005-03-15	
The Coma: Cutting Class	side scroller, survival horror	Devespresso Games,	Windows	2015-10-19	
Condemned: Criminal Origins	Survival horror, melee	Monolith Productions	Xbox 360, Windows	2005-11-15	
Condemned 2: Bloodshot	Survival horror, melee	Monolith Productions	PlayStation 3, Xbox 360	2008-03-11	
The Consuming Shadow	Survival horror	Yahtzee Croshaw	Windows, macOS	2015	
Content warning	Co-op, Survival horror	Skog, Zorro, Wilnyl, Philip, thePetHen, Landfall Publishing	Windows	2024-04-01	
The Count Lucanor	Adventure	Baroque Decay	Windows	2016-03-03	
Corpse Party	Adventure, psychological horror	Team GrisGris	PC-98	1996-04-22	
Corpse Party BloodCovered	Adventure, psychological horror	Team GrisGris	Windows, PlayStation Portable, iOS, Nintendo 3DS	2008-03-08	
Corpse Party: Book of Shadows	Adventure, psychological horror	Team GrisGris	PlayStation Portable, iOS	2011-09-11	
Corpse Party: Blood Drive	Adventure, psychological horror	Team GrisGris	PlayStation Vita	2014-07-24	
Corridors of Genon	Adventure	Malcolm Evans, New Generation Software	ZX Spectrum	1983	
Corridor 7: Alien Invasion	First-person shooter	Capstone Software	MS-MS-DOS	1994-05-20	
Countdown Vampires	Survival horror	K2 LLC	PlayStation	1999-12-22	
Crow Country	Survival horror	SFB Games	Microsoft Windows, PlayStation 5, Xbox Series X|S	2024-05-09	
Crying is not Enough	Survival horror, Third-person shooter	Storyline Team	Windows	2018-06-19	
Cry of Fear	Survival horror, first-person shooter	Team Psykskallar	Windows	2013-04-25	
Cryostasis: Sleep of Reason	Survival horror, first-person shooter, psychological horror	Action Forms	Windows	2008-12-05	
Cult of the Lamb	Roguelite	Massive Monster, Devolver Digital	macOS, Nintendo Switch, PlayStation 4, PlayStation 5, Windows, Xbox One, Xbox Series X/S	2022-08-11	
Cursed Mountain	Survival horror, adventure	Sporing Interactive Media	Windows, Wii	2009-08-21	
Curse: The Eye of Isis	Survival horror	Asylum Entertainment	Xbox, Windows, PlayStation 2	2003-10-21	
D	Puzzle Adventure	WARP	3DO, Sega Saturn, PlayStation, MS-DOS, Windows	1995-04-01	
D2	Survival horror, action role-playing, cosmic horror	WARP	Dreamcast	1999-12-23	
Daymare: 1994 Sandcastle	Survival horror, Third-person shooter	Invader Studios	Windows, PlayStation 4, PlayStation 5, Xbox One, Xbox Series X/S	2023-08-23	
Daymare: 1998	Survival horror, Third-person shooter	Invader Studios	Windows, PlayStation 4, Xbox One	2019-09-17	
Dante's Inferno	Hack and Slash, platform	Visceral Games	PlayStation 3, Xbox 360, PSP	2010-02-04	
The Dark Eye	Point-and-click	inSCAPE	PC, Mac	1995-10-31	
The Darkness	First-person shooter	Starbreeze Studios, 2K Games	PlayStation 3, Xbox 360	2007-06-25	
Dark Deception	Survival horror, Maze game	Glowstick Entertainment	Windows, PlayStation 4, Xbox One, Nintendo Switch	2018-09-27	
Dark Deception: Monsters and Mortals	Asymmetric multiplayer, Survival horror, Maze game	Glowstick Entertainment	Windows, PlayStation 4, PlayStation 5	2020-11-02	
Dark Echo	Horror game	RAC7 Games	Windows, iOS	2015-05-11	
The Dark Pictures Anthology: The Devil in Me	Interactive drama, survival horror	Supermassive Games	PlayStation 4, PlayStation 5, Windows, Xbox One, Xbox Series X/S	2022-11-18	
The Dark Pictures Anthology: House of Ashes	Interactive drama, survival horror	Supermassive Games	PlayStation 4, PlayStation 5, Windows, Xbox One, Xbox Series X/S	2021-10-22	
The Dark Pictures Anthology: Little Hope	Interactive drama, survival horror	Supermassive Games	Nintendo Switch, PlayStation 4, Windows, Xbox One	2020-10-30	
The Dark Pictures Anthology: Man of Medan	Interactive drama, survival horror	Supermassive Games	Nintendo Switch, PlayStation 4, Windows, Xbox One	2019-08-30	
The Dark Pictures: Switchback VR	Action horror	Supermassive Games	PlayStation VR2	2023-03-16	
Dark Salvation	First-person shooter	Mangled Eye Studios	Windows, Linux, OS X	2009-07-28	
DarkSeed	Point-and-click adventure	Cyberdreams	Amiga, Amiga CD32, MS-DOS, Macintosh, Sega Saturn, PlayStation	1992	
Dark Seed II	Point-and-click adventure	Destiny Media Technologies	Windows, Macintosh, Sega Saturn, PlayStation	1995	
Darkest Dungeon	Roguelite	Red Hook Studios	Windows, OS X, Linux, PlayStation 4, PlayStation Vita, iOS, Nintendo Switch, Xbox One	2016	
Darkest Dungeon II	Role-playing game	Red Hook Studios	Windows	2023	
Darksiders	Hack and slash	Vigil Games	Windows, Xbox 360, PlayStation 3	2010-01-05	
Darksiders II	Hack and slash	Vigil Games	Windows, Wii U, Xbox 360, Xbox One, PlayStation 3, PlayStation 4	2012-08-14	
Dark Souls	Action role-playing game	FromSoftware	PlayStation 3, Xbox 360, Windows, PlayStation 4, Xbox One, Nintendo Switch	2011-09-22	
Darkness Within: In Pursuit of Loath Nolder	Adventure, cosmic horror	Zoetrope Interactive	Windows	2007-11-06	
Darkness Within 2: The Dark Lineage	Adventure, cosmic horror	Zoetrope Interactive	Windows	2010-05-28	
Darkwatch	First-person shooter	High Moon Studios	PlayStation 2, Xbox	2005-08-16	
Darkwood	Survival horror, top-down shooter	Acid Wizard Studio	Windows, OS X, SteamOS/Ubuntu	2014-07-24	
Dark Fall	Adventure, psychological horror	XXv Productions	Windows	2002	
Dark Fall II: Lights Out	Adventure, psychological horror	XXv Productions	Windows	2004	
Dark Fall: Lost Souls	Adventure, psychological horror	Darkling Room	Windows	2009	
Darq	Puzzle-platform, psychological horror	Unfold Games	Windows	2019	
Daylight	Adventure	Zombie Studios	PlayStation 4, Windows	2014-04-29	
Days Gone	Action-adventure, survival horror	Bend Studio	PlayStation 4	2019-04-26	
DayZ	Survival game, Third-person shooter, first-person shooter, open world	Bohemia Interactive	Windows	2013-12-16(alpha)	
Dead Island	Action role-playing, action game, open world	Techland	PlayStation 3, Xbox 360, Windows, OS X, Linux	2011-09-06	
Dead Island 2	Action role-playing, action game, open world	Dambuster Studios	Google Stadia, PlayStation 4, PlayStation 5, Windows, Xbox One, Xbox Series X/S	2023-04-21	
Dead Island: Riptide	Action role-playing, action game	Techland	PlayStation 3, Xbox 360, Windows	2013-04-23	
Deadly Quiet	Survival horror, Multiplayer video game	Galactic Crows	Windows	2025	
Demon's Souls	Action role-playing, survival horror	FromSoftware	PlayStation 3	2009-02-05	
Devotion	First-person adventure, psychological horror	Red Candle Games	Windows	2019-02-19	
Depths of Fear: Knossos	Action-adventure	Dirigo Games	Windows	2014	
Dead by Daylight	Multiplayer action game	Behavior Interactive	PlayStation 4, Xbox One, Windows, Nintendo Switch	2016-06-14	
Dead Letter Dept.	psychological horror, Typing game	Belief Engine	Windows, Linux	2025-01-30	
Dead Realm	First-person shooter	Section Studios	Windows, OS X	2015	
Dead Rising	Action game, Beat 'em up, open world	Capcom	Xbox 360	2006-08-08	
Dead Rising: Chop Till You Drop	Action game, Beat 'em up, open world	Tose Software	Wii	2009-02-19	
Dead Rising 2: Case Zero	Action game, Beat 'em up, open world	Blue Castle Games	Xbox Live Arcade	2010-08-31	
Dead Rising 2	Action game, Beat 'em up, open world	Blue Castle Games	PlayStation 3, Xbox 360, Windows	2010-09-24	
Dead Rising 2: Case West	Action game, Beat 'em up, open world	Blue Castle Games	Xbox Live Arcade	2010-12-27	
Dead Rising 2: Off the Record	Action game, Beat 'em up, open world	Capcom Vancouver	PlayStation 3, Xbox 360, Windows	2011-10-11	
Dead Rising 4	Action-adventure	Capcom Vancouver	Windows, Xbox One, PlayStation 4	2016	
Dead Space	Survival horror, Third-person shooter, science fiction, Body horror	Visceral Games	PlayStation 3, Xbox 360, Windows	2008-10-13	
Dead Space (remake)	Survival horror, Third-person shooter, science fiction, Body horror	Motive Studio	PlayStation 5, Xbox Series X/S, Windows	2023-01-27	
Dead Space 2	Third-person shooter, survival horror, science fiction, Body horror	Visceral Games	PlayStation 3, Xbox 360, Windows	2011-01-25	
Dead Space 3	Third-person shooter, science fiction, Body horror	Visceral Games	PlayStation 3, Xbox 360, Windows	2013-02-05	
Dead Space: Extraction	Rail shooter	Visceral Games, Eurocom	Wii, PlayStation 3	2009-09-29	
Dead Static Drive	Adventure, cosmic horror	Mike Blackney	Windows, PlayStation 4	2019	
Dead State	Role-playing game	DoubleBear Productions	Windows	2014-12-04	
Deadly Premonition	Survival horror, adventure, open world, Mystery	Access Games	PlayStation 3, Xbox 360, Windows, Nintendo Switch	2010-02-23	
Deadly Premonition 2: A Blessing in Disguise	Survival horror, Action-Adventure, open world, Mystery	TOYBOX Inc.	Nintendo Switch	2020-07-10	
Deep Fear	Survival horror	Sega	Sega Saturn	1998-07-16	
Deep Sleep	Point and click	Scriptwelder	Browser	2012-07-02	
Deeper Sleep	Point and click	Scriptwelder	Browser	2013-08-29	
The Deepest Sleep	Point and click	Scriptwelder	Browser	2014-07-18	
Dementium: The Ward	Survival horror, first-person shooter	Renegade Kid	Nintendo DS	2007-10-31	
Dementium II	Survival horror, first-person shooter	Renegade Kid	Nintendo DS, OS X, Windows	2010-05-04	
Demon's World	Shoot 'em up	Toaplan, Taito	Arcade	1989	
Detention	Adventure	Red Candle Games	Windows, macOS, Linux, PlayStation 4, Nintendo Switch, Android	2017-01-13	
Devil May Cry	Hack and Slash	Capcom	PlayStation 2, PlayStation 3, Xbox 360, Windows, PlayStation 4, Xbox One, Nintendo Switch	2001-08-23	
Devil May Cry 2	Hack and slash	Capcom	PlayStation 2, PlayStation 3, Xbox 360, Windows, PlayStation 4, Xbox One, Nintendo Switch	2003-01-28	
Devil May Cry 3: Dante's Awakening	Hack and slash	Capcom	PlayStation 2, PlayStation 3, Xbox 360, Windows, PlayStation 4, Xbox One, Nintendo Switch	2005-02-17	
Devil May Cry 5	Hack and slash	Capcom	PlayStation 4, Windows, Xbox One, Xbox Series X/S, PlayStation 5	2019-03-08	
The Divide: Enemies Within	Metroidvania	Radical Entertainment	Windows, PlayStation	1996	
Dino Crisis	Survival horror, action adventure	Capcom	PlayStation, Dreamcast, Windows	1999-07-01	
Dino Crisis 2	Survival horror, action adventure	Capcom	PlayStation, PlayStation Network, Windows	2000-09-13	
Dino Crisis 3	Action-adventure	Capcom	Xbox	2003-06-23	
Dino Stalker	First-person shooter	Capcom	PlayStation 2	2002-06-27	
Discover My Body	Point-and-click	Yames	Windows, Linux, macOS	2020	
Distraint	Psychological horror	Jesse Makkonen	Windows, PlayStation 4, Xbox One, Nintendo Switch	2015, 2018	
Distraint 2	Psychological horror	Jesse Makkonen	Windows	2018	
Doctor Hauzer	Survival horror	Riverhillsoft	3DO Interactive Multiplayer	1994-04-29	
Doki Doki Literature Club!	Visual novel/psychological horror	Team Salvato	Steam	2017-09-22	
Doom	First-person shooter, action game	id software	Windows	1993-12-10	
Doom II: Hell on Earth	First-person shooter, action game	id software	Windows	1994-10-10	
Doom 3	First-person shooter, action game	id Software, Activision	Windows, Linux, OS X, Xbox, Xbox 360, PlayStation 3	2004-08-03	
Doom 3: Resurrection of Evil	First-person shooter, action game	Nerve Software, id Software, Activision	Windows, Linux, Xbox	2005-04-03	
Doom 3: The Lost Mission	First-person shooter, action game	id Software	Windows, Linux, Xbox	2012-10-16	
DOOM	First-person shooter, action game	id Software	Windows, Linux, Xbox	2016-05-13	
DOOM Eternal	First-person shooter, action game	id Software	Windows, Linux, Xbox	2020-03-20	
Doppelganger	Action-adventure game	Alligata, Americana	Amstrad CPC	1985	
Doors	First-person escape room	LSPLASH, Red, Ghostly_Wowzers, jasper_creations	Roblox (Xbox One, Windows, macOS, iOS, Android)	2022-08-10	
Downfall	Adventure	Harvester Games	Windows	2009-05-15	
Dusk	First-person shooter, action game, psychological horror	David Szymanski	Windows	2018-12-25	
Dr. Chaos	Action-adventure	Marionette	Nintendo Entertainment System	1987-06-19	
Dread Delusion	Role-playing game	Lovely Hellplace	Windows	2024	
DreadOut	Survival horror	Digital Happiness, PT Digital Semantika Indonesia	Windows, OS X, Linux	2014-05-15	
DreadOut 2	Survival horror	Digital Happiness	Windows	2020	
DreadOut: Keepers of the Dark	Survival horror	Digital Happiness, PT Digital Semantika Indonesia	Windows, OS X, Linux	2016	
Dredge	Fishing	Black Salt Games	Windows, Nintendo Switch, PlayStation 4, PlayStation 5, Xbox One, Xbox Series X/S	2023-03-30	
Dying Light	Action role-playing, open world	Techland	Windows, PlayStation 4, Xbox One	2015-01-27	
Dying Light: The Following	Action role-playing, open world	Techland	Windows, PlayStation 4, Xbox One	2016-02-09	
Dying Light 2	Action role-playing, survival horror	Techland	Windows, PlayStation 4, Xbox One	2022-02-04	
Echo	Third-person shooter, stealth, science fiction	Ultra Ultra	Windows	2017-09-19	
Echo	Visual Novel, psychological horror	Echo Project	Windows, macOS, Android, Linux	2021-04-01	
Echo Night	Survival horror, Adventure	From Software	PlayStation	1998-08-13	
Echo Night 2: The Lord of Nightmares	Survival horror, Adventure	From Software	PlayStation	1999-08-05	
Echo Night: Beyond	Survival horror, Adventure	From Software	PlayStation 2	2004-01-22	
Edge of Nowhere	Action-adventure game, cosmic horror	Insomniac Games	Windows	2016-06-06	
Elvira: Mistress of the Dark	Adventure, role-playing game, point-and-click adventure game	Horrorsoft	Amiga, Atari ST, C64 MS-DOS	1990	
Elvira II: The Jaws of Cerberus	Adventure, role-playing game, point-and-click adventure game	Horrorsoft	Amiga, Atari ST, C64 MS-DOS	1992	
Emily Wants to Play	Adventure, psychological horror	Shawn Hitchcock	Windows, OS X, iOS, Android, PlayStation 4, Xbox One	2015-12-10	
Endacopia	Comedy horror, Point-and-click adventure	ANDYLAND	Windows	2026-07-27	
Enemy Zero	Survival horror, stealth	WARP	Sega Saturn, Windows	1996-12-13	
Entity	Walking simulator, psychological horror	Scythe Dev Team	Windows	2019-11-29	
Escape Dead Island	Action role-playing, action game	Fatshark	PlayStation 3, Xbox 360, Windows	2014-11-18	
Escape from Bug Island	Survival horror, Third-person shooter	Spike	Wii	2006-12-02	
Escape from Monster Manor	First-person shooter	Electronic Arts	3DO Interactive Multiplayer	1993	
Escape The Ayuwoki	First person, Puzzle, survival horror	DeadlyCrow Games	Windows	2019-11-26	
Escape the Backrooms	Psychological horrorCo-op	Fancy games	Windows	2022-08-11	
Eternal Darkness: Sanity's Requiem	Survival horror, action role-playing, cosmic horror	Silicon Knights	GameCube	2002-06-23	
The Evil Dead	Adventure	Palace Software	Commodore 64, ZX Spectrum	1984	
Evil Dead: Hail to the King	Survival horror	Heavy Iron Studios, THQ	PlayStation, Dreamcast, Windows	2000-12-05	
Evil Dead: A Fistful of Boomstick	Hack and slash	VIS Entertainment, THQ	PlayStation 2, Xbox	2003-06-27	
Evil Dead: Regeneration	Action game, hack and slash	Cranky Pants Games, THQ	PlayStation 2, Xbox, Windows	2005-09-13	
Evil Dead: The Game	Survival horror	Saber Interactive	Windows, Xbox One, Xbox Series X/S, PlayStation 4, PlayStation 5	2022-05-13	
The Evil Within	Survival horror, action role-playing	Tango Gameworks	Windows, PlayStation 3, PlayStation 4, Xbox One, Xbox 360	2014-10-14	
The Evil Within 2	Survival horror, action role-playing, open world	Tango Gameworks	Windows, PlayStation 4, Xbox One	2017-10-13	
The Excavation of Hob's Barrow	Adventure	Cloak and Dagger Games	Windows, macOS, Linux, Nintendo Switch	2022	
Extermination	Survival horror, Body horror	Deep Space	PlayStation 2	2001-03-08	
Ecstatica	Survival horror, Gothic horror	Andrew Spencer Studios	MS-DOS, Windows	1994	
Ecstatica II	Adventure, Gothic horror	Andrew Spencer Studios	MS-DOS, Windows	1997	
Elden Ring	Action role-playing, folk horror, body horror	FromSoftware	PlayStation 4, PlayStation 5, Windows, Xbox One, Xbox Series X/S	2022-02-25	
Faith: The Unholy Trinity	Adventure, psychological horror	Airdorf	Windows	2017	
Fatal Frame / Project Zero	Survival horror	Tecmo Koei	PlayStation 2, Xbox	2001-12-13	
Fatal Frame II: Crimson Butterfly / Project Zero II: Crimson Butterfly	Survival horror	Tecmo Koei	PlayStation 2, Xbox, Wii	2003-11-27	
Project Zero 2: Wii Edition	Survival horror	Tecmo Koei	Wii	2012-06-28	
Fatal Frame II: Crimson Butterfly Remake	Survival horror	Team Ninja	Nintendo Switch 2, PlayStation 5, Microsoft Windows, Xbox Series X/S	2026-03-12	
Fatal Frame III: The Tormented / Project Zero III: The Tormented	Survival horror	Tecmo Koei	PlayStation 2, PlayStation Network	2005-07-28	
Fatal Frame: Mask of the Lunar Eclipse / Project Zero IV: Mask of the Lunar Eclipse	Survival horror	Grasshopper Manufacture	Wii, Nintendo Switch, PlayStation 5, PlayStation 4, Xbox Series X and Series S, Xbox One, Steam	2008-07-31	
Fatal Frame: Maiden of Black Water / Project Zero: Maiden of Black Water	Survival horror	Tecmo Koei	Wii U, Nintendo Switch, PlayStation 5, PlayStation 4, Xbox Series X and Series S, Xbox One, Steam	2014-09-27	
Fatal Survey	Visual Novel psychological horror,	Glompyy	Browser	2025-01-28	
F.E.A.R.	First-person shooter, action game, psychological horror	Monolith Productions	Windows, Xbox 360, PlayStation 3	2005-10-18	
F.E.A.R. Extraction Point	First-person shooter, action game, psychological horror	TimeGate Studios	Windows, Xbox 360	2006-10-24	
F.E.A.R. Perseus Mandate	First-person shooter, action game, psychological horror	TimeGate Studios	Windows, Xbox 360	2007-11-06	
F.E.A.R. 2: Project Origin	First-person shooter, action game, psychological horror	Monolith Productions	Windows, Xbox 360, PlayStation 3	2009-02-10	
F.E.A.R. 3	First-person shooter, action game, psychological horror	Day 1 Studios	Windows, Xbox 360, PlayStation 3	2011-06-21	
Fear & Hunger	Tactical role-playing game, dark fantasy	Miro Haverinen	Mac, PC	2018-12-11	
Fear Effect	Action-adventure game, science fiction	Kronos Digital Entertainment	PlayStation	2000-05-24	
Fear Effect 2: Retro Helix	Action-adventure game, science fiction	Kronos Digital Entertainment	PlayStation	2001-05-21	
Fear Effect Reinvented	Action-adventure game	Sushee	Windows, Xbox One, PlayStation 4	Canceled (2020)	
The Forest	Survival horror	Endnight Games	Windows, PlayStation 4	2018	
Forbidden Forest	Adventure	Cosmi Corporation	Commodore 64	1983	
Forgotten Memories: Alternate Realities	Survival horror, psychological horror	Psychoz Interactive	Windows	2015-04-23	
Fran Bow	Psychological horror	Killmonday Games	Windows, Linux, OS X, Android, iOS	2015-2016	
Frankenstein: The Monster Returns	Platform	Tose	Nintendo Entertainment System	1991	
Frankenstein's Monster	Platform	Data Age	Atari 2600	1983	
Frankenstein	Text adventure	CRL Group	Amstrad CPC, Commodore 64, ZX Spectrum	1987	
From Dusk Till Dawn	First-person shooter, Third-person shooter	Cryo Interactive	Windows	2001-09-11	
Friday the 13th	Action-adventure	Domark	Amstrad CPC, Commodore 64, ZX Spectrum	1985	
Friday the 13th	Survival horror	Pack-In-Video	Nintendo Entertainment System	1989-02	
Friday the 13th: Killer Puzzle	Puzzle game	Blue Wizard Digital	Android, iOS, Nintendo Switch, PlayStation 4, Windows, Xbox One	2018-01-20	
Friday the 13th: The Game	Multiplayer action game	IllFonic	Windows, PlayStation 4, Xbox One, Nintendo Switch	2017-05-26	
Five Nights at Freddy's	Point and click	Scott Cawthon	Windows, Android, iOS	2014-08-24	
Five Nights at Freddy's 2	Point and click	Scott Cawthon	Windows, Android, iOS	2014-11-10	
Five Nights at Freddy's 3	Point and click	Scott Cawthon	Windows, Android, iOS	2015-03-02	
Five Nights at Freddy's 4	Point and click	Scott Cawthon	Windows, Android, iOS	2015-07-23	
Five Nights at Freddy's: Sister Location	Point and click	Scott Cawthon	Windows, Android, iOS	2016-10-07	
Freddy Fazbear's Pizzeria Simulator	Point and click	Scott Cawthon	Windows	2017-12-05	
Ultimate Custom Night	Point and click	Scott Cawthon	Windows	2018-06-27	
Five Nights at Freddy's: Help Wanted	Virtual reality, Survival horror	Scott Cawthon, Steel Wool Studios	PlayStation 4, PlayStation 5, Windows, Nintendo Switch, Oculus Quest, Android, iOS, Xbox One	2019-05-28	
Five Nights at Freddy's: Security Breach	Survival horror	Scott Cawthon, Steel Wool Studios	Windows, PlayStation 5, PlayStation 4, Google Stadia, Xbox One, Xbox Series X/S, Nintendo Switch	2021-12-17	
Five Night's at Freddy's: Into the Pit	Adventure	Mega Cat Studios	Windows, PlayStation 4, PlayStation 5, Nintendo Switch, Xbox One, Xbox Series X/S	2024-08-08	
Flesh Feast	Third-person shooter, action game	Ingames	Windows	1997	
Gakkou de atta Kowai Hanashi	Visual novel	Pandora Box	Super Famicom, Virtual Console	1995	
Galerians	Survival horror	Polygon Magic	PlayStation	1999-08-26	
Galerians: Ash	Survival horror	Polygon Magic	PlayStation 2	2002-04-25	
Ghost House	Side-scroller	Sega	Master System	1986-04-21	
Ghost Hunters	Platform	Oliver Twins	Amstrad CPC, ZX Spectrum	1987	
Ghost Manor	Action game	Xonox	Atari 2600, Vic-20, TurboGrafx-16	1983	
Ghoul School	Action game, Metroidvania	Imagineering	Nintendo Entertainment System	1992-05-01	
Glass Rose	Point-and-click adventure	Capcom	PlayStation 2	2003-11-06	
Gloomwood	Survival horror	Dillon Rogers	Windows	TBA	
Gregory Horror Show	Survival horror	Capcom	PlayStation 2	2003-06-03	
The Grinder	First-person shooter	High Voltage Software	Wii, PlayStation 3, Xbox 360, Windows	Canceled (2011)	
The Guardian of Darkness	Survival horror	Cryo Interactive	Windows, PlayStation	1999-06-20	
Gylt	Survival horror	Tequila Works	Multiple	2019	
Half-Life	First-person shooter	Valve	Windows, PlayStation 2, OS X, Linux	1998-11-19	
Half-Life: Alyx	First-person shooter	Valve	Windows, Linux	2020-03-23	
Halloween	Survival horror	Wizard Video	Atari 2600	1983	
Halloween: The Game	Stealth, Asymmetrical horror	IllFonic, Gun Interactive	PlayStation 5, Xbox Series X/S, Windows	2026-09-08	
Happy's Humble Burger Farm	Survival horror, Cooking game	Scythe Studios	Windows, PlayStation 4, PlayStation 5, Xbox One, Xbox Series X/S, Nintendo Switch	2021-03-12	
Harvester	Adventure, Mystery	DigiFX Interactive	MS-DOS	1996-08-31	
Haunted House	Adventure	Atari	Atari 2600	1982-02	
Haunted House: Cryptic Graves	Survival horror	Dreampainters Software	Windows	2014-11-25	
Haunted House	Action	Magnavox	Magnavox Odyssey	1972	
Haunting Ground	Survival horror	Capcom	PlayStation 2	2005-04-21	
Hayarigami: Keishichou Kaii Jiken File	Adventure, Visual novel	Nippon Ichi Software	PlayStation 2, PlayStation 4, PlayStation 5, PlayStation Portable, Nintendo Switch, Nintendo DS	2004-08-05	
Hayarigami 2: Keishichou Kaii Jiken File	Adventure, Visual novel	Nippon Ichi Software	PlayStation 2, PlayStation 4, PlayStation 5, PlayStation Portable, Nintendo Switch, Nintendo DS	2007-11-15	
Hayarigami 3: Keishichou Kaii Jiken File	Adventure, Visual novel	Nippon Ichi Software	PlayStation Portable, PlayStation 4, PlayStation 5, Nintendo Switch	2009-08-06	
Hell: A Cyberpunk Thriller	Point-and-click adventure	Take-Two Interactive	MS-DOS, 3DO	1994	
Hellblade: Senua's Sacrifice	Action-adventure, psychological horror	Ninja Theory	PlayStation 4, Windows, Xbox One, Nintendo Switch, Xbox Series X/S	2017-08-08	
Senua's Saga: Hellblade II	Action-adventure, psychological horror	Ninja Theory	Windows, Xbox Series X/S	2024-05-21	
The Seventh Bell	Survival horror, Psychological horror	Case Zero Studios	Windows	TBA	
Hellnight	Survival horror, Adventure	Atlus	PlayStation	1998-06-11	
Hello Neighbor	Stealth, survival horror	Dynamic Pixels	Windows, Xbox One, Nintendo Switch, PlayStation 4, iOS, Android, Google Stadia	2017-12-08	
Hello Neighbor 2	Stealth, survival horror	TinyBuild	Windows, Xbox One, PlayStation 4, PlayStation 5, Xbox Series X|S	2022-12-06	
Higurashi When They Cry	Visual novel, Dōjin soft	07th Expansion	PC, PlayStation 2, Nintendo DS, iOS	2002-08-10	
Home Sweet Home (2017 video game)	Survival horror, Psychological horror	Yggdrazil Group, Mastiff	Nintendo Switch, PlayStation 4, Xbox One, Microsoft Windows	2017-09-26	
Hugo's House of Horrors	Adventure	Gray Design Associates	MS-DOS, Windows	1990	
The House of the Dead	Rail shooter	Wow Entertainment	Arcade, Windows, Sega Saturn, Wii, Xbox	1996-09-13	
The House of the Dead 2	Rail shooter	Wow Entertainment	Arcade, Dreamcast, Windows, Wii	1998	
The House of the Dead III	Rail shooter	Wow Entertainment	Arcade, Xbox, Windows, Wii	2002	
The House of the Dead 4	Rail shooter	Wow Entertainment	Arcade, PlayStation 3	2005	
The House of the Dead: Overkill	Rail shooter	Headstrong Games	Wii, PlayStation 3	2009	
House of the Dead: Scarlet Dawn	Rail shooter	Sega Interactive	Arcade	2018	
Hrot	First-person shooter, dieselpunk	Spytihněv	Windows	2023-05-16	
Hunt: Showdown	First-person shooter	Crytek	Windows	2018	
Hunt the Wumpus	Interactive fiction	Gregory Yob	TRS-80	1973	
Husk°	Survival horror, Adventure	UndeadScout	Windows	2017-02-03	
I Am Alive	Survival horror, action adventure	Darkworks	PlayStation 3, Xbox 360	2012-04-03	
Ib	Adventure	kouri, Playism	Microsoft Windows, PlayStation 4, PlayStation 5, Nintendo Switch	2012-02-27	
I Have No Mouth, and I Must Scream	Point-and-click adventure	The Dreamers Guild	OS X, MS-DOS, Windows, MacOS	1995-10-31	
Illbleed	Survival horror, Parody	Climax Graphics	Dreamcast	2001-03-29	
Imabikisō	Visual novel	Chunsoft	PlayStation 3, Wii	2007-10-23	
Immortality	Interactive film	Sam Barlow	Android, iOS, macOS, Xbox Series X/S, Windows	2022-08-30	
I'm Not Alone	Survival horror	TGC, Profenix Studio	Windows	2010	
Imscared	Horror	Ivan Zanotti	Windows	2012-10-12	
The Inpatient	Survival horror	Supermassive Games	PlayStation 4	2018-01-23	
Inside	Puzzle-platform, science fiction	Playdead	Xbox One, PlayStation 4, Windows	2016-06-29	
Insmouse No Yakata	Survival horror, Adventure	I'Max Corp.	Virtual Boy	1995-08-13	
Inner Chains	First-person shooter	Telepaths Tree	Windows	2017-05-18	
Infestation	Action-adventure, science fiction	Danny Gallagher	Amiga, Atari ST, MS-DOS	1990	
Infestation: Origins	Action	Nightmare Forge Games	Microsoft Windows	2024	
Infected	Third-person shooter	Planet Moon Studios	PlayStation Portable	2005-11-15	
Inscryption	roguelike deck-building game	Daniel Mullins	Windows, Linux, macOS, PlayStation 4, PlayStation 5, Nintendo Switch, Xbox One, Xbox Series X/S	2021-10-19	
Iron Helix	Adventure	Drew Pictures	Windows 3.1, Macintosh, Sega CD	1993	
Iron Lung	Submarine simulator	David Szymanski, DreadXP	Windows, Nintendo Switch	2022-03-10	
...Iru!	Survival horror, Adventure	Soft Machine	PlayStation	1998-06-26	
It Came from the Desert	Action-adventure	Cinemaware	Amiga, MS-DOS, Sega Genesis/Mega Drive, Turbo Grafx 16	1989	
Jack the Ripper	Text adventure	CRL Group	Amstrad CPC, Commodore 64, ZX Spectrum	1987	
Ju-On: The Grudge	Horror game	Feelplus	Wii	2009-07-30	
Juggernaut	Adventure	Jaleco	PlayStation	1998-11-19	
Kabus 22	Survival horror	Son Isık Ltd. (2GEN Studio)	Windows	2006-12-25	
Kamaitachi no Yoru	Visual Novel,	Spike Chunsoft	Super Famicom, PlayStation, Game Boy Advance, PC, mobile, iOS, PlayStation Vita, Windows	1994–11–25	
Kamaitachi no Yoru 2: Kangokujima no Warabe Uta	Visual novel	ChunSoft	PlayStation 2, PlayStation Portable	2002-07-18	
Kamaitachi no Yoru x3: Mikazukishima Jiken no Shinsou	Visual novel	ChunSoft	PlayStation 2, Windows	2006-07-27	
Killing Floor	First-person shooter	Tripwire Interactive	Windows	2009-05-14	
Killing Floor 2	First-person shooter	Tripwire Interactive	Windows, PlayStation 4	2016-11-18	
KinitoPET	Survival horror, simulation	troy_en	Windows	2024-01-09	
Kirisame ga Furu Mori	Adventure	HoshikuzuKRNKRN (Sanada Makoto)	Windows	2013-10-11	
Kenseiden	Platform, side-scroller	Sega	Master System	1988-06-02	
Killer Klowns from Outer Space: The Game	Asymmetrical survival horror	IllFonic, Teravision Games	Windows, PlayStation 5, Xbox Series X/S	2024-06-04	
Knights Contract	Hack and Slash, Gothic horror	Game Republic	PlayStation 3, Xbox 360	2011	
Knock-Knock	Adventure, psychological horror	Ice Pick Lodge	Windows	2013	
Kuon	Survival horror, supernatural horror	From Software	PlayStation 2	2004-04-01	
Lakeview Cabin Collection	Survival horror, Parody	Roope Tamminen	Windows	2015	
Laplace no Ma	Role-playing game	Group SNE, Vic Tokai	NEC PC-8801, NEC PC-9801, X68000, MS-DOS, TurboGrafx CD, Super Famicom	1987	
The Last Door	Graphic-adventure	The Game Kitchen	Android, IOs	2013-03-15	
The Last of Us	Action-adventure, Third-person shooter, stealth, survival horror	Naughty Dog	PlayStation 3	2013-06-14	
The Last of Us: Left Behind	Action-adventure, Third-person shooter, stealth, survival horror	Naughty Dog	PlayStation 3, PlayStation 4	2014-02-14	
The Last of Us Part II	Action-adventure, Third-person shooter, stealth, survival horror	Naughty Dog	PlayStation 4	2020-05-29	
Last Year: The Nightmare	Multiplayer action game	Elastic Games	Windows	2019	
Lamentum	Survival horror	Obscure Tales	Windows	2020 (?)	
Layers of Fear	Psychological horror, walking simulator	Bloober Team	Linux, Windows, macOS, PlayStation 4, Xbox One	2016-02-16	
Layers of Fear 2	Psychological horror, walking simulator	Bloober Team	Windows, PlayStation 4, Xbox One	2019-05-28	
Layers of Fear	Psychological horror, walking simulator	Bloober Team	Windows, macOS, PlayStation 5, Xbox Series X/S, Nintendo Switch 2	2023-06-15	
Left 4 Dead	First-person shooter	Turtle Rock Studios	Windows, Xbox 360, OS X	2008	
Left 4 Dead 2	First-person shooter	Turtle Rock Studios	Windows, Xbox 360, OS X, Linux	2009	
The Legacy: Realm of Terror	Role-playing video game	Magnetic Scrolls	MS-DOS	1993	
Legendary	First-person shooter	Spark Unlimited	Windows, Xbox 360	2008-10-24	
Lethal Company	Survival horror, Co-op	Zeekerss	Windows	2023-10-23	
Lethe	Adventure, stealth	Koukou Studios	Windows	2016-08-01	
Lies of P	Soulslike, Action role-playing	Round8 Studio	Windows, PlayStation 4, PlayStation 5, Xbox One, Xbox Series X/S	2023-09-19	
Lifeline	Survival horror	Sony Computer Entertainment	PlayStation 2	2003-01-30	
Limbo	Puzzle-platform	Playdead	Xbox 360, PlayStation3, Windows	2010-07-21	
LIT	puzzle game	WayForward Technologies	WiiWare	2009-12-22	
Little Nightmares	Puzzle-platform, psychological horror	Tarsier Studios	Windows, PlayStation 4, Xbox One, Nintendo Switch	2017-05-28	
Little Nightmares II	Puzzle-platform, survival horror	Tarsier Studios	Windows, PlayStation 4, Xbox One, Nintendo Switch	2021-02-11	
Little Nightmares III	Puzzle-platform, survival horror	Supermassive Games	Nintendo Switch, Nintendo Switch 2, PlayStation 4, PlayStation 5, Microsoft Windows, Xbox One, Xbox Series X/S	2025-10-10	
Lollipop Chainsaw	Hack and slash, action game	Grasshopper Manufacture	PlayStation 3, Xbox 360	2012	
Lone Survivor	Survival horror	Superflat Games	Windows, OS X, Linux, PlayStation 3, PlayStation Vita, PlayStation 4, Wii U	2012	
Lost Within	Adventure, supernatural	Human Head Studios, Amazon Game Studios	iOS, Android (operating system)	2015-04-16	
Lucius I	Adventure	Shiver Games	Windows	2012-10-26	
Lucius II	Adventure	Shiver Games	Windows	2015-02-15	
Lucius III	Adventure	Shiver Games	Windows	2018-12-18	
Luigi's Mansion 2	Action-adventure	Next Level Games	Nintendo 3DS, Nintendo Switch	2013	
The Lurking Horror	Interactive fiction	Infocom	Amiga, Amstrad CPC/PCW, Apple II, Atari 8-bit, Atari ST, Commodore 64/128, Macintosh, MS-DOS	1987-05-06	
Left to Rot	First-person adventure, psychological horror	Tarba Paul Cornel, Galactic Crows Media	PC, Windows	2024	
Mad Father	Survival horror, Role-playing video game, Puzzle video game	Sen, Miscreant's Room	Windows, Nintendo Switch	2012-10-12	
MADiSON	Psychological horror, First-person game	Bloodious Games	Windows, PlayStation 4, PlayStation 5, Xbox Series X/S, Nintendo Switch	2022-07-08	
Manhunt	Survival horror, stealth, Third-person shooter	Rockstar North	PlayStation 2, Xbox, Windows	2003-11-18	
Manhunt 2	Stealth, Third-person shooter	Rockstar Games	PlayStation 2, PlayStation Portable, Wii, Windows	2007-10-29	
Martian Gothic: Unification	Survival horror	Creative Reality	Windows, PlayStation	2000	
Master of Darkness	Platform	SIMS	Game Gear, Master System	1992	
The Medium	Psychological horror	Bloober Team	Windows, Xbox Series X and Series S	2021-01-28	
Metro 2033	First-person shooter	4A Games	Windows, Xbox 360	2010-03-16	
Metro: Last Light	First-person shooter	4A Games	Windows, Xbox 360, PS3	2013-05-14	
Metro Exodus	First-person shooter	4A Games	PlayStation 4, Windows, Xbox One, Stadia, Linux, macOS, PlayStation 5, Xbox Series X/S	2019-02-15	
Michigan: Report from Hell	Adventure	Grasshopper Manufacture	PlayStation 2	2004-08-05	
The Midnight Walk	Puzzle, horror, adventure	MoonHood	PlayStation 5, Microsoft Windows	2025-05-08	
Mizzurna Falls	Adventure	Human Entertainment	PlayStation	1998-12-23	
Mundaun	Survival horror	Hidden Fields	PS4, PS5, Windows, Xbox One, Xbox Series X/S, Nintendo Switch	2023-06-19	
Musya	Adventure, platform	Jorudan	Super Nintendo Entertainment System	1992-05-21	
Monster Bash	Platform	Sega	Arcade	1982	
Monster House	Action-adventure	Artificial Mind and Movement	PlayStation 2, Nintendo DS, GameCube, Game Boy Advance	2006-07-18	
Monster Madness: Battle for Suburbia	Shoot 'em up	Artificial Studios, Immersion Games	Xbox 360, Windows	2007-06-12	
Monster Madness: Grave Danger	Shoot 'em up	Psyonix Studios, Immersion Games	PlayStation 3	2008-08-05	
Moonlight Syndrome	Adventure	Human Entertainment	PlayStation	1997-10-09	
Mouthwashing	Psychological horror, body horror, adventure game	Wrong Organ	Microsoft Windows	2024-09-26	
Murder House	Survival horror	Puppet Combo	PC, PlayStation 4, Xbox One, Nintendo Switch	2020-10-23	
My Father's Long, Long Legs	Interactive fiction	Michael Lutz		2014	
My Friendly Neighborhood	Survival horror	John Szymanski, Evan Szymanski	Windows	2023-07-18	
Mystery House	Adventure	On-Line Systems	Apple II	1980	
Mystic Nights	Survival horror	N-Log Soft	PlayStation 2	2005-09-29	
Nanashi no Game	First-person adventure, psychological horror	Epics	Nintendo DS	2008-07-03	
Nanashi no Game: Me	First-person adventure, psychological horror	G-artists	Nintendo DS	2009-07-27	
Necronomicon: The Dawning of Darkness	point-and-click, adventure	Cryo Interactive	Windows, PlayStation	2001-05-11	
NecroVisioN	First-person shooter, alternate history	The Farm 51	Windows	2009-02-20	
NightCry	Survival horror, point-and-click adventure	Nude Maker	Windows, PlayStation Vita	2016-03-29	
Nightfall: Escape	First-person adventure, psychological horror	Zeenoh	Windows, macOS, Linux	2016-06-26	
Night Slashers	Beat'em up	Data East	Arcade	1993-09	
Night Stalker	Beat 'em up	Mattel	Intellivision	1982	
Nightmare Creatures	Beat 'em up, action adventure, Gothic horror	Kalisto Entertainment	PlayStation, Windows, Nintendo 64, Mobile Phone	1997-09-30	
Nightmare Creatures II	Beat 'em up, action adventure, Gothic horror	Kalisto Entertainment	PlayStation, Dreamcast	2000	
A Nightmare on Elm Street	platform	Rare	Nintendo Entertainment System	1990	
Nitemare 3D	First-person shooter	Gray Design Associates	MS-DOS, Windows	1994-05-17	
Night Trap	Interactive film	Digital Pictures	Multiple	1992	
NOCT	Survival horror, Survival game, top-down shooter	C3SK	Windows	2015-10-10	
Nocturne	Survival horror, adventure	Terminal Reality	Windows	1999-10-31	
Nostromo	Survival horror	Akira Takiguchi	PET 2001, PC-6001	1981-12	
Northbury Grove	Survival horror, stealth	Scythe Dev Team	Windows	2018-10-01	
Northbury Grove: King's Comfort	Survival horror, stealth	Scythe Dev Team	Windows	2019-11-29	
Nosferatu: The Wrath of Malachi	Survival horror, first-person shooter, Roguelike	Idol FX	Windows	2003-10-21	
Nosferatu the Vampyre	Action	Piranha	Amstrad CPC, Commodore 64, ZX Spectrum	1986	
Nosferatu	platform, Beat'em up	SETA Corporation	Super Nintendo Entertainment System	1994	
The Note	Adventure, survival horror	Team Bughouse	PlayStation	1997-01-17	
Nun Massacre	Survival horror	Puppet Combo	Windows, PlayStation 4, PlayStation 5, Nintendo Switch, iOS, Android, Xbox One, Xbox Series X/S	2018-09-29	
ObsCure	Survival horror	Hydravision Entertainment	PlayStation 2, Xbox, Windows	2004-10-01	
ObsCure II	Survival horror	Hydravision Entertainment	Windows, PlayStation 2, Wii, PlayStation Portable	2007-09-07	
Observation	Adventure	No Code	Windows, PlayStation 4, Xbox One	2019-05-21	
Off	Psychological horror	Unproductive Fun Time	Windows	2008-06-05	
Omori	Role-playing, psychological horror	Omocat	Windows, macOS, Xbox One, Xbox Series X/S, Nintendo Switch, PlayStation 4	2020-12-25	
Observer	Adventure Walking simulator, psychological horror, science fiction, Cyberpunk	Bloober Team, Aspyr	Windows, Linux, macOS, PlayStation 4, Xbox One	2017-08-15	
Onimusha: Warlords	Survival horror, hack and slash	Capcom	PlayStation 2, Xbox, Windows	2001-01-25	
Onimusha 2: Samurai's Destiny	Hack and slash, action adventure	Capcom	PlayStation 2, Windows	2002-05-07	
Onimusha 3: Demon Siege	Hack and slash, action adventure	Capcom	PlayStation 2, Windows	2004-04-26	
Otogirisou	Visual novel	ChunSoft	Super Famicom, PlayStation	1992-03-07	
Outlast	Survival horror, psychological horror	Red Barrels	Windows, Xbox One, PlayStation 4	2013-09-04	
Outlast 2	Survival horror, psychological horror	Red Barrels	Windows, Xbox One, PlayStation 4	2017-04-25	
The Outlast Trials	Survival horror, psychological horror	Red Barrels	Windows, PlayStation 4, Xbox One, Xbox Series X/S, PlayStation 5	2023-05-18	
OverBlood	Survival horror, science fiction	Riverhillsoft	PlayStation	1997-05-22	
Oxenfree	Graphic adventure game	Night School Studio	macOS, Windows, Xbox One, PlayStation 4, Linux, iOS, Android, Nintendo Switch	2016	
Pandorum	Third-person shooter	Artificial Life, Inc.	iOS	2009-10-15	
The Park	Adventure	Funcom	Windows, PlayStation 4, Xbox One	2015-10-27	
Paratopic	Walking simulator, psychological horror, cosmic horror	Arbitrary Metric	Windows	2018-09-06	
Parasite Eve	survival horror, Action role-playing, Body horror	Square Usa, Inc.	PlayStation	1998-03-29	
Parasite Eve II	survival horror, Action role-playing, Body horror	Squaresoft, Inc.	PlayStation	1999-12-06	
The 3rd Birthday	Action role-playing, Third-person shooter	Square Enix, HexaDrive	PlayStation Portable	2010-12-22	
The Padre	Survival horror, Parody	Shotgun with Glitters	Windows	2019-04-18	
Paranoid	Survival horror	Madmind Studio	Windows	2023-12-15	
The Path	Walking simulator	Tale of Tales	Windows, OS X	2009-03-18	
Pathologic	Survival game, Role-playing game, Immersive sim, adventure, psychological horror, cosmic horror	Ice-Pick Lodge	Windows	2005-06-09	
Penumbra Episode One: Overture	Survival horror, first-person shooter	Frictional Games	Windows, Linux, OS X	2007-03-30	
Penumbra Episode Two: Black Plague	Adventure, psychological horror, cosmic horror	Frictional Games	Windows, Linux, OS X	2008-02-12	
Perception	Adventure, psychological horror	The Deep End Games	Windows, Nintendo Switch, PlayStation 4, Xbox One	2017-05-30	
The Persistence	Action-adventure, Roguelike, science fiction	Firesprite	PlayStation 4	2018-07-24	
Phantom Slayer	First-person shooter, adventure, maze	Med Systems	TRS-80 Color Computer, Dragon 32/64	1982	
Phantasmagoria	Point-and-click adventure	Sierra On-Line, Kronos Digital Entertainment	MS-DOS, Windows, OS X, Sega Saturn	1995-07-31	
Phasmophobia	First-person	Kinetic Games	Windows	2020-09-18	
Phantasmagoria: A Puzzle of Flesh	Point-and-click	Sierra Entertainment	MS-DOS, Windows	1996-11-30	
Pineview Drive	Adventure	VIS Games	Windows, Linux	2014-07-31	
A Plague Tale: Innocence	Action-adventure, stealth, action horror	Asobo Studio	Windows, PlayStation 4, Xbox One, Nintendo Switch, PlayStation 5, Xbox Series X/S	2019-05-14	
A Plague Tale: Requiem	Action-adventure, stealth, folk horror	Asobo Studio	Nintendo Switch, PlayStation 5, Microsoft Windows, Xbox Series X/S	2022-10-18	
Poppy Playtime	Horror game, adventure game	MOB Games	Windows, Android, iOS	2021-10-12	
Postal	Top-down shooter, psychological horror	Running with Scissors	Windows, Mac OS, Dreamcast, Android	1997-09-24	
Predator: Hunting Grounds	Asymmetric survival horror, first-person shooter	IllFonic	PlayStation 4	2020-04-24	
Prey	Immersive sim, survival horror, action adventure, first-person shooter, science fiction	Arkane Studios	Windows, PlayStation 4, Xbox One	2017-05-05	
Project Firestart	Survival horror, science fiction	Dynamix	Commodore 64	1989	
P.T.	Horror game	Kojima Productions, Konami	PlayStation 4	2014-08-12	
Puppet Master: The Game	Survival horror	October Games	Microsoft Windows	2023-03-01	
The Quarry	Interactive drama, survival horror	Supermassive Games	Windows, PlayStation 4, PlayStation 5, Xbox One, Xbox Series X/S	2022-06-10	
A Quiet Place: The Road Ahead	Survival horror	Stormind Games, Saber Interactive	Windows, PlayStation 5, Xbox Series X/S	2024-10-17	
RAHKO: Shadows Around Us	Survival horror, action adventure	Another Round Entertainment	Microsoft Windows	TBA	
The Rats	Interactive fiction	Hodder & Stoughton	Commodore 64, ZX Spectrum	1985	
Realms of the Haunting	First-person shooter	Gremlin Interactive	Windows 95	1996-11-28	
Reanimal	Cinematic platformer, survival horror	Tarsier Studios	Nintendo Switch 2, PlayStation 5, Microsoft Windows, Xbox Series X/S	2026-02-13	
Remothered: Tormented Fathers	Survival horror, stealth	Darril Arts	PlayStation 4, Xbox One, Windows	2018-01-30	
Remothered: Broken Porcelain	Survival horror, stealth	Darril Arts Modus Games	PlayStation 4, Xbox One, Windows	2020-10-13	
Renfield: Bring Your Own Blood	Horror, roguelike, shoot 'em up	Mega Cat Studios, Skybound Games	Windows	2023-09-20	
Resident Evil Zero	Survival horror	Capcom	GameCube, Wii, Windows, PlayStation 3, PlayStation 4, Xbox 360, Xbox One	2002-11-12	
Resident Evil	Survival horror	Capcom	PlayStation, Windows, Sega Saturn, Nintendo DS	1996-03-22	
Resident Evil (remake)	Survival horror	Capcom	GameCube, Nintendo Wii, Xbox 360, PlayStation 3, Windows, Xbox One, PlayStation 4	2002-03-22	
Resident Evil 2	Survival horror	Capcom	PlayStation, Windows, Nintendo 64, Dreamcast, GameCube	1998-01-21	
Resident Evil 2 (remake)	Survival horror	Capcom	PlayStation 4, Xbox One, Windows	2019-01-25	
Resident Evil 3: Nemesis	Survival horror	Capcom	PlayStation, Dreamcast, Windows, GameCube	1999-09-22	
Resident Evil 3	Survival horror	Capcom	PlayStation 4, Windows, Xbox One	2020-04-03	
Resident Evil ‒ Code: Veronica	Survival horror	Capcom	Dreamcast, PlayStation 2, GameCube, Xbox 360, PlayStation 3	2000	
Resident Evil 4	Third-person shooter, Survival horror	Capcom	GameCube, PlayStation 2, Windows, Nintendo Wii, PlayStation 3, Xbox 360	2005-01-11	
Resident Evil 4 (remake)	Third-person shooter, Survival horror	Capcom	Windows, PlayStation 5, Xbox Series X and Series S	2023-03-24	
Resident Evil 5	Third-person shooter	Capcom	PlayStation 3, Xbox 360, Windows	2009-03-05	
Resident Evil 6	Third-person shooter	Capcom	PlayStation 3, Xbox 360 Windows	2012-10-02	
Resident Evil 7: Biohazard	Survival horror, Gothic horror	Capcom	PlayStation 4, Xbox One, Windows	2017-01-24	
Resident Evil Village	Survival horror, Gothic horror	Capcom	PlayStation 5, PlayStation 4, Windows, Xbox One, Xbox Series X and Series S	2021-05-07	
Resident Evil Requiem	Survival horror	Capcom	PlayStation 5, Windows, Xbox Series X and Series S	2026-02-27	
Resident Evil: The Mercenaries 3D	Third-person shooter	TOSE	Nintendo 3DS	2011-06-11	
Resident Evil: Operation Raccoon City	Third-person shooter, survival horror	Slant Six Games, Capcom	PlayStation 3, Xbox 360, Microsoft Windows	2012-03-20	
Resident Evil Outbreak	Survival horror, Multiplayer	Capcom	PlayStation 2	2003-12-11	
Resident Evil Outbreak: File #2	Survival horror, Multiplayer	Capcom	PlayStation 2	2004-10-09	
Resident Evil: Resistance	Survival horror	NeoBards Entertainment	PlayStation 4, Windows, Xbox One	2020-04-03	
Resident Evil RE:Verse	Multiplayer, survival horror	Capcom	Windows, PlayStation 4, PlayStation 5, Xbox One, Xbox Series X and Series S	2022-10-28	
Resident Evil Survivor	First-person shooter	Capcom, TOSE	PlayStation	2000	
Resident Evil Survivor 2 – Code: Veronica	Light gun shooter, first-person shooter	Capcom, Namco, Nextech, SIMS Co., Ltd.	Arcade, PlayStation 2	2001-11-08	
Resident Evil: Dead Aim	First-person shooter/Third-person shooter	Capcom, Cavia	PlayStation 2	2003-02-13	
Resident Evil Gaiden	Action-adventure	Capcom, M4	Game Boy Color	2001-12-14	
Resident Evil: Revelations	Survival horror	Capcom	Nintendo 3DS, PlayStation 3, Xbox 360 Windows	2012-01-27	
Resident Evil: Revelations 2	Survival horror	Capcom	Windows, PlayStation 3, PlayStation 4, PlayStation Vita, Xbox 360, Xbox One	2015-03-20	
Resident Evil: The Umbrella Chronicles	Rail shooter	Capcom, Cavia	PlayStation 3, Wii	2007-11-13	
Resident Evil: The Darkside Chronicles	Rail shooter	Cavia	PlayStation 3, Wii	2009-11-17	
Umbrella Corps	Tactical shooter	Capcom	Microsoft Windows, PlayStation 4	2016-06-21	
Resistance: Fall of Man	First-person shooter	Insomniac Games	PlayStation 3	2006-11-11	
Resistance 2	First-person shooter	Insomniac Games	PlayStation 3	2008-11-04	
Resistance 3	First-person shooter	Insomniac Games	PlayStation 3	2011-09-06	
République	Stealth, point-and-click, science fiction, Cyberpunk	Camouflaj	Windows	2016	
Returnal	Third-person shooter, Roguelike, psychological horror	Housemarque	PlayStation 5	2021-04-30	
The Ring: Terror's Realm	Survival horror	Asmik Ace Entertainment, Nurding Group	Dreamcast	2000	
Rise of Nightmares	Survival horror	Sega	Xbox 360 Kinect	2011-09-06	
Run Like Hell	Survival horror, Third-person shooter	Digital Mayhem	PlayStation 2, Xbox	2002-09-27	
Rule of Rose	Survival horror	Punchline	PlayStation 2	2006-01-19	
Sad Satan	Psychological Horror	ZK	Windows	2015	
Sagebrush	Walking simulator	Redact Games	Windows	2018-09-18	
Sanitarium	Point-and-click	DreamForge Intertainment	Windows	1998-04-30	
Sally Face	Adventure	Portable Moose	Nintendo Switch, Windows, macOS, PlayStation 4, PlayStation 5	2016-2019	
Saw	Survival horror	Zombie Studios	Windows, PlayStation 3, Xbox 360	2009-10-06	
Saw II: Flesh & Blood	Survival horror	Zombie Studios	PlayStation 3, Xbox 360	2010-10-19	
Scary Tales Vol. 1	Adventure	Puppet Combo	Windows	2019	
SCP – Containment Breach	Adventure	Joonas Rikkonen	Windows	2012	
SCP: Fragmented Minds	Survival horror, action game	HST Studios, indie.io	Windows	2025-01-27	
Scratches	Adventure, point-and-click, psychological horror	Nucleosys	PC	2006-03-08	
Scorn	First-person shooter, cosmic horror, body horror	Ebb Software	Windows	2022-10-14	
The Screamer	Action role-playing game	Magical Zoo	NEC PC-8801	1985	
Shadow Man	Action-adventure game	Acclaim Studios Teesside	Nintendo 64, Dreamcast, PlayStation, Windows	1999-07-31	
Shadow of the Comet	Adventure	Infogrames	MS-DOS, PC-98, Linux	1993	
Shadowless	Psychological horror	ultron01	Windows	TBA	
S: Lost Chapters	Survival horror	Blue Isle Studios	Windows	TBA	
Shadows of the Damned	Action game, Third-person shooter	Grasshopper Manufacture	PlayStation 3, Xbox 360	2011-06-21	
Shark Jaws	Adventure	Atari	Arcade	1975	
Shin Hayarigami	Adventure, Visual novel	Nippon Ichi Software	PlayStation 3, PlayStation Vita, Nintendo Switch, Android, iOS	2014-08-07	
Shin Hayarigami 2	Adventure, Visual novel	Nippon Ichi Software	PlayStation 3, PlayStation 4, PlayStation Vita, Nintendo Switch	2016-07-07	
Shin Hayarigami 3	Adventure, Visual novel	Nippon Ichi Software	PlayStation 4, Nintendo Switch	2021-07-28	
Shin Kamaitachi no Yoru: 11ninme no Suspect	Visual novel	ChunSoft	PlayStation 3, PlayStation Vita	2011-12-17	
Shiryou Sensen: War of the Dead	Action role-playing	Fun Factory	MSX2, NEC PC-8801, PC Engine	1987	
Shiryou Sensen: War of the Dead Part 2	Action role-playing	Fun Factory	MSX2, NEC PC-8801, PC Engine	1988	
Signalis	Survival horror, psychological horror	rose-engine	Windows, PC, PlayStation 4, Xbox One, Nintendo Switch	2022-10-27	
Silent Hill	Survival horror, psychological horror	Team Silent	PlayStation, PlayStation Network	1999-01-31	
Silent Hill 2	Survival horror, psychological horror	Team Silent	PlayStation 2, Xbox, Windows, PlayStation 3, Xbox 360	2001-09-24	
Silent Hill 2 (remake)	Survival horror, psychological horror	Bloober Team	PlayStation 5, Windows	2024-10-03	
Silent Hill 3	Survival horror, psychological horror	Team Silent	PlayStation 2, Windows, PlayStation 3, Xbox 360	2003-05-23	
Silent Hill 4: The Room	Survival horror, psychological horror	Team Silent	PlayStation 2, Windows, Xbox	2004-06-17	
Silent Hill: Origins	Survival horror	Climax Studios	PlayStation 2, PlayStation Portable	2007-11-06	
Silent Hill: Shattered Memories	Adventure, psychological horror	Climax Studios	Wii, PlayStation 2, PlayStation Portable, PlayStation Network	2009-12-08	
Silent Hill: Homecoming	Third-person shooter	Double Helix Games	Windows, PlayStation 3, Xbox 360	2008-09-30	
Silent Hill: Downpour	Survival horror, psychological horror	Vatra Games	PlayStation 3, Xbox 360	2012-03-13	
Silent Hill: Book of Memories	Hack and slash	WayForward Technologies	PlayStation Vita	2012-08-16	
Silent Hill: The Short Message	Survival horror, psychological horror	HexaDrive	PlayStation 5	2024-01-31	
Silent Hill f	Survival horror, psychological horror	Konami, Neobards Entertainment	Windows, PlayStation 5, Xbox Series X/S	2025-09-25	
Simple 2000 Series Vol. 113: The Tairyou Jigoku	Survival horror	Tamsoft	PlayStation 2	2007-02-22	
The Sinking City	Action-adventure, survival horror	Frogwares	Nintendo Switch, PlayStation 4, PlayStation 5, Windows, Xbox One, Xbox Series X/S	2019-06-27	
The Sinking City 2	Survival horror	Frogwares	PlayStation 5, Windows, Xbox Series X/S	2026	
Singularity	First-person shooter, science fiction	Raven Software	Windows, Xbox 360, PlayStation 3	2010-06-25	
Forbidden Siren	Survival horror, Stealth game	Project Siren	PlayStation 2	2003-11-06	
Forbidden Siren 2	Survival horror, Stealth game	Project Siren	PlayStation 2	2006-02-09	
Siren: Blood Curse	Survival horror, Stealth game	Project Siren	PlayStation 3	2008-07-24	
Sir, You Are Being Hunted	First-person shooter, Stealth game, open world	Big Robot	PC	2014-05-01	
Slay the Princess	Dating sim, psychological horror, visual novel	Black Tabby Games	Linux, macOS, Windows	2023-10-23	
Slender: The Eight Pages	Adventure	Parsec Productions	Windows, OS X	2012-06	
Slender: The Arrival	Adventure	Parsec Productions	Windows, OS X, Xbox 360, PlayStation 3	2013-03	
Soft & Cuddly	Action-adventure	The Power House	ZX Spectrum	1987-09	
SOMA	First-person adventure, science fiction, psychological horror, body horror	Frictional Games	Linux, OS X, Windows, PlayStation 4, Nintendo Switch	2015-09-22	
Song of Horror	Psychological horror, survival horror	Protocol Games	PlayStation 4, Microsoft Windows, Xbox One	2020-05-16	
Sons of the Forest	Survival horror	Endnight Games	Windows	2024	
Soul of the Samurai	Action-adventure	Konami	PlayStation	1999-04-28	
A Sound of Thunder	Survival horror, action adventure	Möbius Entertainment	Game Boy Advance	2004-02-28	
Space Gun	Shoot 'em up, Rail shooter, science fiction	Taito	Amiga, Arcade, Atari ST, Commodore 64, MS-DOS, PlayStation 2, Master System, Xbox, ZX Spectrum	1990-10	
Spirit Hunter: Death Mark	Visual novel	Experience	Nintendo Switch, PlayStation Vita, PlayStation 4, Windows, Xbox One	2017	
Spirit Hunter: NG	Visual novel	Experience	Nintendo Switch, PlayStation Vita, PlayStation 4, Windows	2018	
Spirit Hunter: Death Mark II	Visual novel	Experience	Nintendo Switch, PlayStation 4, PlayStation 5, Windows	2022	
Splatterhouse	Beat 'em up	Namco	Arcade, PC Engine	1988	
Splatterhouse 2	Beat 'em up	Namco	Sega Genesis	1992	
Splatterhouse 3	Beat 'em up	Namco	Sega Genesis	1993	
Splatterhouse	Beat 'em up, hack and slash	BottleRocket, Namco Bandai Games	PlayStation 3, Xbox 360	2010-11-23	
S.T.A.L.K.E.R.: Shadow of Chernobyl	First-person shooter, Immersive sim	GSC Game World	Windows	2007	
S.T.A.L.K.E.R.: Clear Sky	First-person shooter, Immersive sim	GSC Game World	Windows	2008	
S.T.A.L.K.E.R.: Call of Pripyat	First-person shooter, Immersive sim	GSC Game World	Windows	2009	
The Suffering	First-person shooter/third-person shooter	Surreal Software	PlayStation 2, Xbox, Windows	2004-03-09	
The Suffering: Ties That Bind	First-person shooter/third-person shooter	Surreal Software	PlayStation 2, Xbox, Windows	2005-09-26	
Sweet Home	Action role-playing	Capcom	Nintendo Entertainment System	1989-12-15	
Sylvio	Adventure	Apostrophe	Windows, OS X	2015	
System Shock	First-person shooter, Immersive sim, science fiction, Body horror, Cyberpunk	Looking Glass Studios	MS-DOS, OS X, Windows	1994-09-22	
System Shock 2	First-person shooter, Immersive sim, science fiction, Body horror	Irrational Games, Looking Glass Studios	PC, Windows	1999-08-11	
Stasis	Adventure, point-and-click, science fiction	The Brotherhood	Windows	2015-08-31	
Still Wakes the Deep	Horror, Walking simulator	The Chinese Room	PlayStation 5, Windows, Xbox Series X/S	2024-06-18	
Stories Untold	Adventure	No Code	Windows, macOS, Nintendo Switch, PlayStation 4, Xbox One	2017-02-17	
Stray Souls	Survival horror	Jukai Studio	PlayStation 4, PlayStation 5, Windows, Xbox One, Xbox Series X/S	2023-10-25	
Tattletail	Survival horror	Waygetter Electronics	Windows, Mac OS	2016	
Tecmo's Deception: Invitation to Darkness	Strategy-RPG	Tecmo	PlayStation, PlayStation Network	1996-06-25	
Terrifier: The ARTcade Game	Platformer	Relevo, Selecta Play	Nintendo Switch, PlayStation 5, Windows, Xbox Series X/S	2025-11-21	
Terror House	Adventure	Bandai	Bandai LCD Solarpower	1982	
Theresia	Visual novel, adventure, psychological horror	WorkJam	Nintendo DS, iOS	2008-09-11	
The Bridge Curse: Road to Salvation	adventure, psychological horror	SOFTSTAR, East Asiasoft Limited	PlayStation 5, Nintendo Switch, GeForce Now	2022-02-10	
The Bridge Curse 2: The Extrication	adventure, psychological horror	SOFTSTAR, PQube, Gamera Games	PlayStation 5, Nintendo Switch, PlayStation 4, Xbox One, Microsoft Windows, Xbox Series X and Series S	2023-10-09	
The Thing	First-person shooter/Third-person shooter, survival horror, Body horror	Computer Artworks	PlayStation 2, Windows, Xbox	2002-08-21	
Teleglitch	Roguelike, top-down shooter	Test3 Projects	Windows, OS X, Linux	2013	
The Texas Chainsaw Massacre	Adventure	Wizard Video	Atari 2600	1982	
The Texas Chain Saw Massacre	Survival horror	Sumo Nottingham	Microsoft Windows, Xbox One, Xbox Series X/S, PlayStation 4, PlayStation 5	2023-08-18	
Through the Woods	Survival horror	Antagonist Games	Windows	2016	
Til Morning's Light	Adventure, puzzle	WayForward Technologies, Amazon Game Studios	iOS, Android (operating system)	2015-05-21	
Tokyo Twilight Busters	Adventure, point-and-click	Wolf Team	NEC PC-9801	1995-06-23	
Tormented Souls	Psychological horror, survival horror	Dual Effect	PlayStation 5, PlayStation 4, Xbox Series X/S, Xbox One, Nintendo Switch, Windows	2021-08-27	
Tormented Souls 2	Psychological horror, survival horror	Dual Effect	PlayStation 5, Xbox Series X/S, Windows	2025-10-23	
Trepang2	First-person shooter	Trepang Studios	Windows, Xbox Series X/S, PlayStation 5	2023-06-21	
Twilight Syndrome: Kinjirareta Toshi Densetsu	Adventure	Spike	Nintendo DS	2008-07-24	
Twilight Syndrome: Kyūmei-hen	Adventure	Human Entertainment	PlayStation	1996-07-19	
Twilight Syndrome: Saikai	Adventure	Spike	PlayStation	2000	
Twilight Syndrome: Tansaku-hen	Adventure	Human Entertainment	PlayStation	1996-03-01	
Twisted Metal: Black	Vehicle combat	Incognito Entertainment	PlayStation 2, PlayStation 4	2001-06-18	
Uninvited	Adventure	ICOM Simulations	Apple IIGS, Amiga, Atari ST, Commodore 64, Macintosh, NES, Famicom, PC, Pocket PC	1986	
Unforgiving: A Northern Hymn	Survival horror, adventure, stealth	Angry Demon Studio	Windows	2017-11-27	
Until Dawn	Adventure	Supermassive Games	PlayStation 4	2015-08-25	
Until Dawn: Rush of Blood	Rail shooter	Supermassive Games	PlayStation 4	2016-10-13	
Unturned	Survival	Nelson Sexton	Windows, OS X	2014-07-07	
Vaccine	Survival horror	RNC	Windows, Wii U, Nintendo Switch	2017-01-21	
Vampire Killer	Platform	Konami	MSX2, Wii U (Virtual Console)	1986-10-30	
Vampire: The Masquerade – Bloodlines	Action role-playing	Troika Games	Windows	2004-11-16	
Vampire: The Masquerade – Bloodlines 2	Action role-playing	The Chinese Room, Paradox Interactive	PlayStation 5, Windows, Xbox Series X/S	2024	
Vampire Rain	Survival horror, Stealth game	Artoon	Xbox 360, PlayStation 3	2007	
The Void	Adventure	Ice-Pick Lodge	Windows	2008-04-17	
Virus: It is Aware	Third-person shooter	Cryo Interactive	Windows	1999-12-07	
Visage	Psychological horror	SadSquare Studio	Windows, PS5, PS4, Xbox One, Xbox Series X, Xbox Series S	2020-10-30	
The Walking Dead	Graphic adventure game	Telltale Games	Multiple	2012	
The Walking Dead: Survival Instinct	First-person shooter	Terminal Reality	Windows	2013	
Overkill's The Walking Dead	First-person shooter	Overkill Software	Windows	2018	
The Walking Dead: Onslaught	Action-adventure	Survios	PlayStation 4, PlayStation 5, Windows	2020-09-29	
Walls Closing In	Survival horror, stealth	Scythe Dev Team	Windows	2019-10-01	
We Happy Few	Survival, stealth, open world	Compulsion Games	Windows, Xbox One	2018-08-10	
Where Time Stood Still	Action-adventure	Denton Designs	ZX Spectrum, MS-DOS, Atari ST, Amiga	1988	
White Day: A Labyrinth Named School	Adventure, supernatural horror	Sonnori	Windows	2001	
White Day	Adventure, supernatural horror	ROI Games	Android, iOS, Windows, PlayStation 4	2015-11-09	
White Day 2: The Flower That Tells Lies	Adventure, supernatural horror	Rootnstudio Ltd.	PlayStation 5, Xbox Series X/S	2024-08-15	
White Night	Survival horror	Osome/Parallel Studio	Windows, Xbox One, PlayStation 4, OS X, Linux	2015-03-03	
Who's Lila?	Adventure	Garage Heathen	Windows	2022-02-22	
World of Horror	point-and-click, cosmic horror	Panstas	Windows	2023	
World War Z	Third-person shooter, survival horror	Saber Interactive	Windows, PlayStation 4, Xbox One	2019-04-16	
Return to Castle Wolfenstein	First-person shooter, supernatural horror, science fiction	Gray Matter Studios, Id Software	Windows, Linux, OS X, Xbox, PlayStation 2	2001-11-19	
Wolfenstein	First-person shooter, supernatural horror, science fiction	Raven Software	Windows, PlayStation 3, Xbox 360	2009-08-17	
Xenophobe	Run and gun	Bally Midway	Arcade, Nintendo Entertainment System	1987	
The X-Files: Resist or Serve	Survival horror	Black Ops Entertainment	PlayStation 2	2004-03-16	
Yomawari: Lost in the Dark	Survival horror	Nippon Ichi Software	PlayStation 4, PlayStation 5, Nintendo Switch, Windows	2022-04-21	
Yomawari: Midnight Shadows	Survival horror	Nippon Ichi Software	PlayStation Vita, PlayStation 4, PlayStation 5, Nintendo Switch, Windows, Android, iOS	2017-08-24	
Yomawari: Night Alone	Survival horror	Nippon Ichi Software	PlayStation Vita, PlayStation 5, Nintendo Switch, Windows, Android, iOS	2015-10-29	
Yuuyami Doori Tankentai	Adventure	Spike	PlayStation	1999-10-07	
Yume Nikki	Psychological horror	Kikiyama	Windows	2004-06-26	
Yuppie Psycho	Adventure	Baroque Decay	Windows	2019-04-25	
You Are Empty	First-person shooter, alternate history	Mandel ArtPlains, Digital Spray Studios	Windows	2006-10-27	
Zero Tolerance	First-person shooter	Technopop	Genesis	1994	
Zombie Raid	Rail shooter	American Sammy	Arcade	1995	
Zombi	Action-adventure	Ubisoft	Amstrad CPC, Amiga, Commodore 64	1986	
Zombie Revenge	Beat 'em up, shooter	Sega, Data East	Arcade, Dreamcast	1999	
ZombiU	First-person shooter, survival horror	Ubisoft Montreal	Wii U, Windows	2012-11-18	
Zoochosis	Survival horror	Clapperheads	Windows	2024	

== See also ==
- Survival horror
- Horror fiction
