= Soft & Cuddly =

1987 video game

- Developer: John George Jones
- Publisher: The Power House
- Platform: ZX Spectrum
- Release: UK: September, 1987; ES: Early 1988
- Genre: Action-adventure
- Mode: Single-player

Soft & Cuddly is a horror action-adventure game released for the ZX Spectrum home computer. It was developed by John George Jones and published by The Power House in September 1987 in the United Kingdom and in early 1988 in Spain. The player assumes the role of a man armed with a laser gun and a jet pack, whose mother, the Android Queen, has been dismembered. The player's task is to locate the scattered body parts of the Android Queen and sew her back together.

Jones had previously developed a game called Go to Hell. In an interview he stated that he developed the game for his own amusement; he enjoyed the reactions people gave to the game. The original, pre-release, version of the game featured more grisly images. Reviewers praised the game's graphics but had mixed feeling about the scenes actually depicted by the graphics. Some reviewers criticized the game's gameplay as repetitive but praised as being fun and akin to a horror film by others.

== Gameplay ==
Soft & Cuddly is an action-adventure game set in a world of 256 rooms. The player controls the son of the Android Queen. The Queen has imprisoned her husband, the player character's father, in a refrigerator. The Queen has been dismembered in an accident, leaving her husband in danger of being attacked by evil spirits.

The four conjoined babies. The player character is standing at the bottom-right corner of the screen.

The object of the game is to collect the eight pieces of the Android Queen's body then stitch her back together again. The player must first find and approach the refrigerator in order to be told where the first body part can be found. Once this has been returned to the player's trapped father, the next body part location will be revealed. Once all eight body parts have been collected and returned to the refrigerator, the player must find a needle and thread in order to restore the Android Queen. The location of the refrigerator is randomized at the beginning of each new game.

The game world consists of a number of rooms and passages with background scenery including a machine which stretches four conjoined babies and men being torn apart on racks. The game's rooms are filled with enemies and traps such as spiked ceilings, falling anvils and airborne spinning blades. The player character is armed with a laser gun and a jet pack which is used to fly around the game world. The laser can overheat and become inoperable for a time if not used sparingly. Scenery and surfaces can be degraded then destroyed by repeated laser fire, allowing access to adjacent rooms which would otherwise be unreachable or require a detour. The player starts each game with three lives; the game's display features a heart strength indicator which is reduced each time the player is injured. If the player loses all their heart strength, their heart stops, resulting in a lost life. Players can render themselves invisible and invincible for a limited period three times on a single life. When the player character is invisible, he can fire the laser in order to determine his current location.

== Development and release ==
Soft & Cuddly was developed for The Power House by John George Jones. Jones had previously developed Go to Hell for Triple Six. Go to Hell was published in 1985 and featured "...revolting, crude and downright vile images." When interviewed by Sinclair User, in the October 1987 issue, the programmer was asked "Whatever possessed you to write a game like Soft and Cuddly...". To this Jones responded, "I didn't write the game because I'm a horrible person, I wrote it to amuse myself." Jones also stated "I love the reaction people give, I can't stand 'nice' inoffensive things...". The original version of the game was more gruesome; the babies were being torn apart rather than stretched and "...the sheep was bouncing up and down on a corpse." When asked how long he would retain interest in computers, Jones stated that he had already lost interest. Soft & Cuddly was released by The Power house during September 1987 in the United Kingdom. The game was later released in Spain during the first quarter of 1988. The game featured in a competition printed in the November 1987 issue of Sinclair User. The first prize was a day in the company of The Power House's staff including a trip to the London Dungeon. Other prize winners received a copy of Soft & Cuddly or a poster of the game's inlay artwork.

== Reception ==
Reception

Review scores
Publication	Score
Crash	55%
Sinclair User	6/10
Your Sinclair	7/10
MicroHobby ('Addiction' score)	7/10

Soft & Cuddly received average review scores from critics. The game's graphics were praised; Sinclair User reviewer Jim Douglas stated "Graphically, it is certainly unusual, and occasionally brilliant." Crash magazine's three reviewers also praised the graphics but raised some issues. Nick Roberts described them as smooth and slick, but stated that they were "a mite sketchy". Roberts also stated "colour is used very well." Paul Sumner stated "There are some cleverly-animated and attractively-coloured graphics". Robin Candy said they are the game's greatest asset.

Reviewers held differing opinions on the game's setting and themes. Sumner stated the game is "dragged down by distasteful graphics and a horribly grim inlay." Roberts described the game as "sick", adding "I only recommend Soft & Cuddly to those of you who cut your toenails with a carving knife!" Douglas was critical of the game's themes; he described playing Soft & Cuddly as "watching very large and unpleasant graphics jigging up and down like a box of offal". Tony Lee of Your Sinclair was more positive, stating, "This is a very sick game indeed, but fortunately I have a very sick sense of humour."

The overall game received a more positive reception from Lee and MicroHobby magazine's reviewer as opposed to the reviewers from Crash and Sinclair User. MicroHobby's reviewer called Soft & Cuddly a typical arcade adventure with a performance worthy of a horror movie. Douglas stated, "The actual playing of the game is, unfortunately, a rather tiresome business." He criticized the game for consisting of character movement coupled with occasional item gathering. Douglas described the game's enemies as being "bog standard cannon fodder aliens", saying "they drift around being annoying and sapping your energy." Candy stated that "It's very easy to get into, but boring." He added that exploration is the best part of the game but becomes repetitive. Sumner stated "all there is to Soft & Cuddly is graphics. The gameplay is repetitive." Lee said that the game is fun; "I love this one."

Nearly thirty years after its release, Soft & Cuddly was the subject of a book published by Boss Fight Books in 2016, written by Jarett Kobek.

== See also ==
- List of horror video games
