= Iru! =

1998 video game

...Iru!
- Developer: Soft Machine
- Publisher: Takara
- Platform: PlayStation
- Release: JP: 26 March 1998
- Genre: Adventure

...Iru! (Note: Japanese: …いる!) is a 1998 adventure game for the PlayStation. It was developed by Soft Machine and published by Takara. The game has a horror theme, and is set on an island off the coast of Japan, where students find themselves trapped in a high school where one by one, students are discovered dead.

The game was an anomaly from Soft Machine as they were predominantly known for assisting with trivia and sports video games before Iru!. It was also a rare Japanese horror game that drew from Cthulhu Mythos. On its release, it received middling scores from Dengeki PlayStation who found the game appropriately scary, but found its controls and pacing to be weak. Retrospective reviews Hardcore Gaming 101 and The A.V. Club similarly found the pacing poor and the gameplay frustrating, but said it may appeal to audiences who enjoyed the lo-fi aesthetics of indie horror video games that grew more popular later in 2020.

== Gameplay ==
Austin Jones of The A.V. Club said that on its surface, Iru! appeared to be a survival horror game, but was closer to a horror-themed adventure game with set of puzzles and flags to be set to proceed with the story. Robert Fenner of Hardcore Gaming 101 echoed this, describing Iru! as predominantly being an inventory-based adventure game, where the player is free to explore without being attacked throughout most of the gameplay.

Iru! is played in a first-person perspective. A meter is shown when a potential killer is near the door to the area the player is located, which forces the player to find a hiding place before the meter runs out.

== Plot ==
Iru! is set on a small island off the coast of Japan on the evening before a cultural festival. At Kirigaoka High School, the protagonist Tatsuya, his love interest Yuma, and some of their classmates are staying late to finish preparations.

Before long, the lights go out, and Yuma vanishes. As Tatsuya explores the school, the corpses of his friends begin to be found, while the few teachers on-site either cower in fear or act as if nothing is happening. Soon, its discovered that the faculty and students have engaged in occult rituals, in an effort to prepare the school for the rebirth of Cthulhu.

== Background and development ==
In the early 1990s, there was a boom period for school-set ghost stories in Japan. The initial trend originated from a school teacher named Toru Tsunemitsu, who began to share ghost stories with his young students, with many being set in schools. These stories were published by Kodansha in 1990 under the title Gakkō no Kaidan, and became very popular. By the mid-1990s, horror games featuring school-set ghost stories and students became particularly prevalent on PlayStation. This included Iru!, which involves a story of supernatural occurrences on the eve of a school festival.

Iru! was developed by Soft Machine. Fenner describes it as a lower-budget production. The company had previously assisted in developing sports and trivia video games for the Family Computer and TurboGrafx-16. This led to Jones describing Iru! an anomaly in Soft Machine's catalogue. The story draws elements from various past works of horror fiction, such as H.P. Lovecraft's "The Call of Cthulhu" (1928), a rarity in Japanese horror games of the period. Fenner said that the game went beyond referencing Lovecraft, citing influences of the works of August Derleth, Clark Ashton Smith, Robert E. Howard and Robert W. Chambers, with the game even having Chambers' The King in Yellow (1895) appearing in-game.

== Release and reception ==
Reception

Review score
Publication	Score
Dengeki PlayStation	50/100, 65/100

Iru! was released on March 26, 1998 for the PlayStation in Japan. It was published by Takara. Fenner said the title had no easy English-language expression, as its title expresses the presence of a living being. Suggested translations have included "...It's Here!" and "...They're here!"

In contemporary reviews, the two reviewers in Dengeki PlayStation found that Iru! had poor controls, with one saying that even moving around could incite motion sickness in the player. They also both found the pacing of the story to be slow, with one reviewer saying you have to move around the school in vain attempts to make the story progress. Both reviewers found the horror aspects of the story well done, citing its influence in Cthulhu Mythos and the horror aspect of a school at night.

From retrospective reviews, Jones and Fenner echoed earlier comments from the Dengeki PlayStation reviewers, finding the pacing poor as the game was mostly spent wandering empty halls, with Fenner saying that the game's length was artificially padded by a lot of running back and forth." Jones also described the controls as "occasionally unwieldy" while Fenner said that knowing what to do with the items was simple, but finding the in-game triggers that make them appear was the real challenge. A review in DenFamico Gamer said the graphics were inferior to newer games. They said that Iru! would not be for everyone, but recommended the game in terms of atmosphere, background music and simple gameplay for high quality horror.

Fenner ultimately only recommended the game for audiences enticed by the lo-fi horror surge that was currently sweeping indie games, saying they would be remiss to examine Iru!. Jones similarly said that the Lovecraftian elements and aesthetic were "newly appealing" due to the rise in popularity of titles like Paratopic (2018) and the Haunted PS1 Demo Discs series.

== See also ==
- List of PlayStation games
- List of works influenced by the Cthulhu Mythos
- Video games in Japan
