= Baldi's Basics in Education and Learning =

2018 video game

- The original cover art depicting the main character, Baldi
- Developer: Micah McGonigal (Note: Known online as "mystman12")
- Publisher: Micah McGonigal (Note: The mobile releases, on iOS and Android, and future Baldi's Basics games were published under the name, "Basically Games".)
- Designer: Micah McGonigal
- Engine: Unity
- Platforms: Windows, macOS, Linux, Android, iOS
- Release: Windows, macOS, Linux: March 31, 2018; Android, iOS: December 23, 2019
- Genres: Horror; educational
- Mode: Single-player

Baldi's Basics in Education and Learning (Note: Also known as Baldi's Basics Classic in mobile versions, on iOS and Android.) is a 2018 survival horror video game developed and published by Micah McGonigal. Parodying 1990s educational games, it was made for the Meta Game Jam in 2018. The player is tasked with collecting seven notebooks and escaping a school while avoiding being caught by the school's titular teacher, Baldi. The player may use various items to impede Baldi or other characters.

Baldi's Basics became popular on YouTube through Let's Plays, inspiring many fan-made modifications, animations and song adaptations. It was well received by video game journalists, who praised the gameplay, presentation and satire of the educational video game genre, but criticized its difficulty. Following a successful Kickstarter campaign, a successor, Baldi's Basics Plus, entered early access in 2020. A remaster, Baldi's Basics Classic Remastered, was released in 2022.

== Gameplay ==
A screenshot of the beginning of Baldi's Basics Classic Remastered. Baldi, its titular main antagonist, stands in front of the player.

Baldi's Basics in Education and Learning is a first-person survival horror game, that parodies 1990s educational video games. It takes place at the school. The player must collect seven scattered notebooks to escape. The notebooks belong to the player character's friend, who cannot retrieve them so as to not be late for "eating practice". Each notebook contains three simple math problems, but starting with the second notebook, unsolvable math problems start to occur, after which Baldi, a school teacher, becomes hostile and begins chasing the player. Baldi chases the player with a ruler while smacking it against his hand as he moves. He can also hear every sound that they make (e.g. when opening doors). As they continue to collect more notebooks and fail to correctly answer math problems, Baldi becomes increasingly faster and harder to avoid. If the player gets caught by Baldi they're jumpscared and a game over triggers.

The player may encounter other characters that may impede their progress, such as Principal of the Thing, It's a Bully, and Playtime. If the player breaks a school rule, such as running in the halls or entering the teacher's lounge, Principal will lock them in the detention room. The Bully takes one of the player's items upon interaction, such as quarters, while Playtime forces the player to jump rope. Items are scattered around the school, which the player can use to their advantage; for instance, safety scissors can cut Playtime's rope, which will temporarily prevent her from jumping rope with the player. As well, they must manage their limited stamina.

== Development ==
Baldi's Basics in Education and Learning was developed by Micah McGonigal. Its main character Baldi originated from comic strips that McGonigal had made in the past. The comic revolved around Baldi's then-personality, where he was an inventor whose inventions always failed. McGonigal abandoned the comic sometime later. Prior to the game, he learned how to code on his Nintendo 3DS through SmileBASIC, and later with Unity. In 2018, McGonigal canceled remakes of the Petit Computer games previously made by him, to enter the Itch.io-hosted contest Meta Game Jam; to gain experience in game development on the Unity. At the Meta Game Jam, McGonigal and other contestants had to make a game based on other video game genres, that featured meta elements. Its development lasted two weeks, starting on March 17.

=== Design ===
When designing the game, Micah chose and took inspiration from the 1996 video game Sonic's Schoolhouse, as well as various other educational video games from the 1990s. After he saw gameplay footage of them, it gave him a feeling of being "off" or "unsettling", which influenced him to recreate that feeling for Baldi's Basics through the inconsistent visuals of 3D and 2D elements. McGonigal repurposed Baldi to be a school teacher to fill his role of the game's titular main antagonist. When incorporating educational elements into the game, Micah designed math problems to be simple to not break the pace of the gameplay.

== Release ==
Baldi's Basics in Education and Learning was released on personal computers on March 31, 2018, where it placed in second place in the competition. In June, the game was released on Game Jolt and received an update, which slightly lowered its difficulty. Mobile ports on iOS and Android were released on December 23, 2019, under the name Baldi's Basics Classic. It features an endless mode, where the player must keep collecting notebooks until Baldi catches them, but solving math problems will slow him down. In April 2025, McGonigal hinted at plans for releasing Baldi's Basics on consoles.

== Reception ==
Baldi's Basics went viral in May of 2018, after several Let's Play YouTubers, such as Markiplier, PewDiePie, and Jacksepticeye, made videos on the game. Various viral videos were also made, like animations and song adaptations, such as "Baldi's Basics: The Musical", made by the musical YouTube channel "Random Encounters". On YouTube, Baldi's Basics videos have gained over 500 million views. Fans were involved in modifications, with journalists noting appearances of the game in Roblox and Minecraft as recreations, as well as unauthorized mobile game knockoffs. It was also highly successful, and by August 2018, the game had been downloaded over a million times. And by December 2019, it was downloaded over 5 million times, similarly to the mobile ports.

=== Critical reception ===
Baldi's Basics in Education and Learning was praised by journalists for its gameplay, presentation and satire of the educational video game genre. Gita Jackson of Kotaku praised its satire for making fun of bad educational games and pivoting from humor to horror, while acknowledging its fourth-wall break on the in-game poster and its warning screen when booting up. She also praised its gameplay, comparing it to the "OG Slenderman game, but with math" calling it jokingly "[her] worst nightmare". Jan Wöbbeking of 4Players found its premise to sound and look more "ridiculous". He acknowledged its initial disguise as an educational game, until Baldi starts chasing the player through the school, and noticed an appeal of its janky design, crude drawings (of the characters and environment) and surreal voice samples.

Jesse Grodman of Dread Central/DreadXP praised its gameplay and presentation. The latter reminded him of a low-quality educational Flash games; its intentionally dated visuals clash with various other art styles, which range from Microsoft Paint drawings to Windows 3D Maze Screensaver graphics and Unity assets. However, he criticized the game's difficulty, which, upon being caught by Baldi, forces them to start the game from the beginning. Which is caused due to specific in-game circumstances, such as being locked in the detention room or running out of stamina while being chased. He argued that a save feature would solve the issue.

== Spin-offs and other games ==
- Baldi's Basics Plus was announced on July 24, 2018, for a Kickstarter campaign as a "full game" of the original Baldi's Basics, following its popularity online, with a funding goal of US$50,000 (€43,000). The campaign succeeded, surpassing its initial goal with a total pledged amount of $61,375 by the end of the funding on August 23. It was planned to release in December of 2019, and later delayed to early 2020, until its launch as early access on June 12, 2020, via Steam, Itch.io, and Game Jolt. It introduced new characters as well as roguelike elements such as randomly-generated maps and random events like fog or floods.
- Baldi's Basics Field Trip was released on July 24, 2018, as a demo to promote the launch of a Kickstarter campaign for Baldi's Basics Plus. It is set in a forest on a field trip, where the player must keep a campfire burning by gathering firewood. Failure triggers Baldi to chase the player, leading to a game over. The demo would later be repurposed in Baldi's Basics Plus, as a game mode.
- Baldi's Basics Birthday Bash was released on April 1, 2019, as a birthday-themed version for the first anniversary of the original game. It adds randomly chosen items, decorations and costumes for the characters.
- Baldi's Basics Classic Remastered was teased in the spring of 2021 and later released on October 21, 2022, via Steam, Itch.io, and Game Jolt. It is a remastered version featuring both remakes of the original Baldi's Basics and Birthday Bash, alongside a "Demo Style", which adds elements from Baldi's Basics Plus to the layout of the original game. All modes also include endless mode.

== See also ==
- List of horror games
- 2018 in video games
