= Darkwood =

2017 survival horror video game

- Developer: Acid Wizard Studio
- Publishers: Acid Wizard Studio (Note: The publishing rights were transferred to Hooded Horse in December 2025.) (PC); Crunching Koalas; Hooded Horse (PC)
- Programmer: Gustaw Stachaszewski
- Artists: Artur Kordas; Jakub Kuć
- Composer: Artur Kordas
- Engine: Unity
- Platforms: Linux macOS; Windows; PlayStation 4 Nintendo Switch; Xbox One; Google Stadia; PlayStation 5 Xbox Series X/S
- Release: Linux, macOS, Windows; August 17, 2017; PlayStation 4 May 14, 2019; Nintendo Switch; May 16, 2019; Xbox One; May 17, 2019; Google Stadia; September 17, 2021; PlayStation 5 October 28, 2022; Xbox Series X/S; December 23, 2022
- Genre: Survival horror
- Mode: Single-player

Darkwood is a 2017 survival horror video game developed and published by Acid Wizard Studio. The game was first released through Steam Early Access on July 24, 2014, eventually becoming a full game release on August 17, 2017 for Linux, macOS, and Windows. The game was also ported to consoles by Crunching Koalas and was released for PlayStation 4, Nintendo Switch and Xbox One in May 2019, for Google Stadia on September 17, 2021 and for PlayStation 5 and Xbox Series X/S on October 28 and December 23, 2022. In 2025, Hooded Horse acquired the publishing rights for the PC version of the game.

The game takes place in a mysterious dark forest "somewhere in the territory of the Soviet Bloc", wherein the main characters have been trapped. It is played from a top down perspective. During the daytime the player can explore the world and prepare for the night where they have to survive in a hideout against encroaching enemies.

A sequel, Darkwood 2, is being developed by Ice-Pick Lodge and published by Hooded Horse under supervision by the original developers of Acid Wizard Studio.

== Gameplay ==
The game is played from a top down perspective. It features a semi-open world, with the player unlocking new areas as the storyline progresses. It also features a crafting system, a day/night cycle, trading and non-player character (NPC) interaction, a skill system, stealth and combat, as well as multiple storyline branches which alter several aspects of the world.

During daytime, the player can explore the world and scavenge for supplies at several locations scattered around each biome as well as spend this time repairing doors or barricades around the hideout and crafting new items and upgrades at the workbench. During the day, the player can also "cook" Hallucinogens at his stove to gain access to various skills, any beneficial skill that the player chooses requires a detrimental skill to also be chosen. During the night, the player cannot leave the hideout and must defend against possible intruders until morning. Planning a defensive strategy is key and players have the opportunity to lay traps and barricade doors or windows to slow down any intruders.

Should the player survive the night, they will gain reputation with the trader which can be used to trade for more expensive items. If the player dies during the night, they will wake up in the next morning without receiving any reputation. Should the player die while out scavenging, they will suffer a loss of half their inventory which is then marked on the map for later collection. Higher difficulties have higher penalties for death such as the loss of lives or permanent death.

The storyline is shaped based on how the player reacts to the requests and actions of NPCs. Aiding different ones will lead to different endings, and sometimes influences sub-plots relating to several other NPCs. The game switches to a different map in its second chapter, with the previous regions becoming locked and several new gameplay elements and NPCs being introduced. Different characters from the first chapter may appear too, depending on the player's actions. The game features two different main endings, with each character's subplot being defined by other, smaller actions, as well as which of these endings the player has achieved.

The game is advertised as "being scary without having jump scares".

== Synopsis ==
=== Setting and characters ===
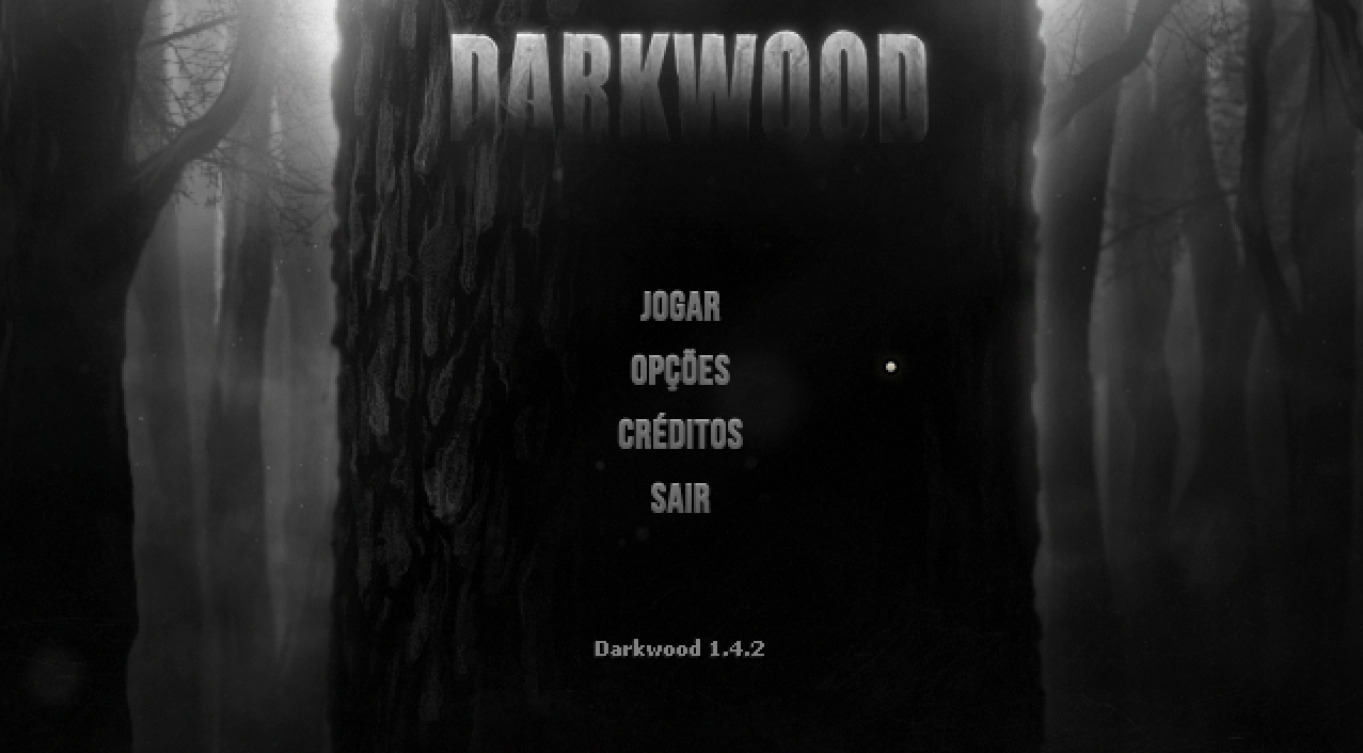
Game title screen

Darkwood is set somewhere in Poland in the late 1980s where a mysterious forest has engulfed a large amount of land and is continuing to expand. Many people have been left trapped by the forest and a strange plague is ravaging the survivors, killing and causing victims to transform into monsters and abominations. A group named "The Outsiders" consisting mostly of government officials and soldiers were sent to investigate the woods, setting up hideouts and a tunnel system to get in and out of the forest. By the time the game takes place most of the Outsiders are dead or evacuated from the zone.

In the prologue, the player takes control of an apparent doctor as he searches for supplies. The Doctor seems to be disillusioned with his job of helping locals and is hellbent on escaping the forest. After the prologue, the player takes control of "The Stranger", a man who is searching for the stolen key that will lead him through an underground passageway out of the forest. Other characters include the trader, who helps the protagonist in the prologue, the three, another trader who appears in chapter 2, a half-man half-wolf hybrid known only as "The Wolfman", a drunk cyclist known as the "Bike Man", and Piotrek, who is mesmerised by space travel and Yuri Gagarin, and wishes to build a rocket.

=== Plot ===
==== Prologue ====
The game begins with The Doctor rambling about the forest and how it has consumed all exits and trapped its inhabitants, his inability to treat the plague and his devotion to escaping the woods before he perishes. While scavenging for gasoline, The Doctor comes across the Stranger, injured and unconscious after an unknown accident. After looting a large key from his body, the Doctor theorizes that the Stranger possesses knowledge on how to escape the forest. The Stranger is then captured, sedated and eventually beaten as the Doctor interrogates him regarding an escape route. The story focus and controls switch to the Stranger as he engineers an escape from the Doctor's house. After some exploration, the cottage is broken into by several monsters and the Stranger blacks out.

==== Chapter 1 ====
Gameplay screenshot

It is implied in a cutscene that the Trader stumbled across the Doctor's cottage and rescued the Stranger, bringing him back to a hideout in the Dry Meadow. The Stranger first explores the underground entrance to make sure the Doctor has not gone through with the key, but finds that the door has not been opened in a while. The player may then side with the Wolfman or the Musician to find the Doctor, or accomplish this by their own devices.

Once finding the Doctor in the train wreck (either by exploring his house from the prologue, or getting an appointment from the Musician), he will attempt to resist the Stranger. Several outcomes are available, including killing the Doctor for his key or allowing him to accompany the player through the underground passage. One way or another, progressing through the armoured door leads to the end of Chapter 1.

==== Chapter 2 ====
As the Stranger leaves the tunnel he finds that it no longer leads out of the forest and instead leads to a swamp. The Stranger will also find the beheaded corpse of the Trader, and will instead be visited by three masked figures in the mornings. Chapter 2 is where many choices in Chapter 1 affect the outcomes of certain characters, for example, if players did not aid the Wolfman then he will steal items from the player and lure them into a trap, and if players followed the Wolfman's path, the Musician will appear in the Stranger's hideout.

The Stranger finds a large talking tree blocking the exit of the forest in a flooded village, which indirectly asks the Stranger to explore a radio tower. A cripple residing in this village requests that the Stranger burns this tree. Both pathways offer ways of leaving the forest and of reaching the Epilogue.

==== Epilogue ====
The Stranger pushes through the forest until reaching a town and their old apartment, where he settles in for a long sleep. However, careful exploration reveals this ending to be an illusion which the player can uncover, if they spot the odd things in the apartment block. The Stranger eventually finds roots growing under the floorboards and a hole under his bed. Crawling through will have the Stranger wake up naked, with his clothes discarded nearby, in a passage overgrown with roots.

The player awakens in a chamber filled with thousands of people curled up around a strange being, dead or sleeping and muttering in bliss. If the Stranger aided the Doctor, he will find him resting next to the being. The being attempts to entice the Stranger by making him feel warm and tired, if the player does not resist then they will fall unconscious and be back in the apartment with only one course of action available: bliss and ignorance. If the Player resists, then the Stranger will find a flamethrower among the sleepers and burn the being and all those around it to death. The fire spreads so rapidly that the Stranger is unable to escape; and the flames quickly consume most of the forest and its inhabitants. The death of the strange being and the Stranger's sacrifice allow the military to deploy to the forest safely to save the remaining inhabitants and restore order. In both endings, text blocks detailing each character's fate appear, which can be influenced by the player's actions during the game.

== Development ==
According to the developers, Darkwood was inspired by:

"The works of David Lynch, Strugacki brothers, Stanisław Lem. Games like Fallout, Dark Souls, Project Zomboid, Teleglitch. Slavic folklore. And, well, life."

They also said:

"A lot people said there are similarities between Lovecraft and Darkwood, and turned out that none of us read any Lovecraft before making Darkwood."

The game was revealed with the release of a pre-alpha gameplay trailer on YouTube, on March 5, 2013. A page for the game was created on Steam Greenlight on March 11, 2013, with the following months seeing the release of a campaign on the popular crowdfunding website Indiegogo which funded the game's initial developing. The campaign collected over US$57,000, totalizing 143% of the established goal (US$40,000). On July 24, 2014, the game was released to the public in an alpha stage, with updates being released ever since. Support for 32-bit Linux systems, although present at first, was dropped mid-development, as a survey done by the developers showed no players currently using such a system. On June 6, 2017, the game was pushed out of alpha, and into version beta 1.

A live action trailer produced by the Polish studio Film Fiction was released on July 19, and the full game was released on August 18, 2017.

On August 25, the developers released a blog post on image hosting website Imgur, telling the story of the game's development process and releasing a free torrent of it, asking the players to buy it if they enjoy it. This move was motivated by two reasons, they wanted some players who couldn't afford the game to be able to play it, and also received several e-mails related to theft of game keys. They stated that they preferred to give the game for free to some people than feed the leeching key-reselling websites.

On January 22, 2018, the developers released the 1.2 update, bringing Spanish, Brazilian Portuguese and German translations to the game. The translations were worked on with the help of the community. They also stated that more language localizations were in development. On August 7, 2019, the 1.3 version was released, containing a number of bugfixes, optimizations and localizations for Simplified Chinese, Italian, Turkish and Hungarian. A French localization was also confirmed to be in development.

The game was ported to consoles by Crunching Koalas. A Nintendo Switch version was announced during the Nindies Nintendo Direct on March 20 and was released on May 16, 2019. It was also released for the PlayStation 4 and Xbox One on May 14 and May 16, 2019. It released for Google Stadia on September 17, 2021 and later for PlayStation 5 on October 28 and Xbox Series X/S on December 23, 2022. On December 2, 2025, American publisher Hooded Horse announced that it had acquired the publishing rights for the PC version of Darkwood, although the deal would not affect the game's console versions.

The PS5 version makes use of the adaptive triggers and haptic feedback functions of the DualSense controller.

== Reception ==
Reception

Aggregate scores
Aggregator	Score
Metacritic	PC: 80/100; NS: 74/100; PS4: 80/100; XONE: 80/100
OpenCritic	77% recommend

Critics wrote positive pieces regarding the game prior to and after its public release. It has a score of 80/100 on Metacritic based on 16 reviews. Metacritic also included it in their "top 100 best videogames of 2017" list. Fellow review aggregator OpenCritic assessed that the game received strong approval, being recommended by 77% of critics.

Amy Josuweit, writing for The Mary Sue, praised the game for not relying on jumpscares, creating what she calls a "PTSD-inclusive horror experience".

The game was nominated for "Most Fulfilling Community-Funded Game" at the 2018 SXSW Gaming Awards.

The announcement of the Nintendo Switch version was followed by articles by Variety and IGN. In the second one, Tom Marks (writing for IGN) praised the game for "not taking cheap shots" and "playing surprisingly well with a Switch Pro Controller".
