= Zombie Raid =

1995 video game

- Cover art
- Developer: American Sammy
- Publisher: American Sammy
- Programmers: Tomohiro Takahashi, Hiroaki Murase
- Artists: Isao Suwa, Ujita, Noriyo Antako
- Composer: Brian L. Schmidt
- Platform: Arcade (Seta 1st generation hardware)
- Release: NA: September 28, 1995
- Genre: Light gun shooter
- Mode: Up to 2 players simultaneously

Zombie Raid is a screen scrolling, horror-themed light gun shooter game released for the arcade by American Sammy in January 1995.

== Plot ==
Gameplay of the first level, depicting a grave robber aiming at the player

In 1918 England, a small village suffers a rash of kidnappings and grave-robbing incidents, and heavily armed zombies have begun to emerge. With the job too dangerous for the police to handle, private detective Edward Windsor begins to investigate. Following a shootout in the village cemetery, Edward rescues a man named Charles, and the two join forces to infiltrate a nearby castle where the zombies have originated. They become separated upon entering the castle, with Edward falling into a subterranean dungeon and having to fight his way out. Shortly after Edward and Charles reunite, Charles suffers a fatal gunshot wound but transforms into a hideous monster, which Edward must defeat in order to continue. Edward moves through the castle laboratory only to find Charles - mutated into a new form - waiting to battle him again at the exit.

After defeating Charles again, Edward must set three colored crystals into the correct positions in order. Any mistake, or a failure to find all three crystals in previous stages, causes Edward to fall to his death in a pit of spikes and ends the game. If the correct combination is entered, Edward confronts the mad monster scientist who has been creating the zombies in order to mutate weak mortals into powerful creatures that can dominate the world. The scientist drinks one of his own potions, which mutates him into a giant reptilian beast, Edward battles him and eventually triumphs by shooting the beast's head off. Edward walks away, reflecting that even though the village can now live in peace, he feels that he did not fulfill his mission.

== Gameplay ==
The player travels through five stages and must shoot zombies and other monsters along the way before being hit by their attacks (gunshots, knives, axes, etc.). Innocent bystanders appear frequently; if they are shot, the player suffers a health penalty. Pieces of the scenery such as gravestones and windows can be destroyed to reveal weapon power-ups and bonus items. The player starts the game with a standard handgun, but stronger weapons such as shotguns, machine guns, and fire rifles can be found; however, if the player is hit or shoots a bystander, any weapon power-ups are lost. The player's controller is a pump-action shotgun mounted to the cabinet. When a weapon's ammunition supply runs out, the player must pump the fore-end to reload.

A boss character must be defeated at the end of each stage in order to advance to the next. In addition, to reach the final boss of the game, the player must find three colored crystals and place them in the proper order at the end of the fifth stage. Failure to find them all or place them correctly will immediately end the game, with the player's character being dropped into a pit of spikes.

== Development ==
Zombie Raid was developed by both Japanese and Americans working at American Sammy Corporation. The game's music was composed by Brian L. Schmidt, who also made the BSMT2000 sound system (Zombie Raid does not run on this system, however). Zombie Raid runs on Seta's first-generation arcade system, which was originally developed in 1987 and allows for high-quality sprite graphics.

== Release ==
Zombie Raid was released on September 28, 1995. The game was released exclusively in North America.

== Reception ==
Next Generation gave Zombie Raid a score of two stars out of five, and stated that it "isn't terrible, it's kind of fun, but compared to the current shooter crop, it's lacking."
