= Depths of Fear: Knossos =

2014 video game

- Developer: Dirigo Games
- Publisher: Dirigo Games
- Platform: Windows
- Release: WW: April 24, 2014
- Genre: Action-adventure
- Mode: Single-player

Depths of Fear: Knossos is a 2014 action-adventure video game developed by Dirigo Games.

== Gameplay ==
Players control the hero Theseus and attempt to kill monsters from Greek mythology in the Labyrinth of Knossos, including the Minotaur. It is played from a first-person perspective, and the levels are randomly generated. Players can purchase equipment and collect power-ups, which assist them in combat. To keep from being overwhelmed, players can use stealth.

== Development ==
Depths of Fear: Knossos was released for Windows on April 24, 2014.

== Reception ==
Depths of Fear: Knossos received negative reviews on Metacritic. Rock Paper Shotgun likened it to a surreal, low budget film. Though they found parts of it incoherent or shoddy, the overall effect was "jarring, hugely imperfect and strangely alarming". They recommended it to players who can forgive its flaws and appreciate the weirdness. Digitally Downloaded said that people scared off by its low quality will miss out on "a good bit of fun". Hardcore Gamer called it " an ill-conceived jumble of ideas".
