= Distraint (video game) =

2015 video game

- Deluxe Edition cover art
- Developer: Jesse Makkonen
- Platforms: Windows; Android; iOS; PlayStation 4; PlayStation Vita; Xbox One; Nintendo Switch
- Release: Windows October 21, 2015; Android November 27, 2016; iOS April 19, 2017; PS4, PS Vita NA: September 10, 2019 EU: September 11, 2019; Xbox One September 11, 2019; Nintendo Switch September 13, 2019
- Genres: Adventure; Psychological horror
- Mode: Single-player

Distraint is a 2D indie psychological horror adventure game developed and published by Finnish developer Jesse Makkonen on October 21, 2015. It follows Price, a young man who becomes increasingly consumed by guilt as he carries out three evictions for his employer.

On September 29, 2017, the game received a free update on Steam called Distraint: Deluxe Edition.

== Gameplay ==
Price standing in a dimly lit room in Distraint: Deluxe Edition

The player controls Price through long horizontal paths, such as hallways and outdoor passages. In these places, he can interact with objects and talk to other characters. Conversations are linear, not requiring choices.

The game has an inventory system that can contain up to three different items. Puzzles often consist of collecting a certain object from the environment and then using it at the correct location.

Players must manually save their progress at predetermined locations.

== Plot ==
The story is told as a flashback, and there is no way to change the course of events.

A young man named Price works for the powerful law firm McDade, Bruton & Moore. His initial desire is to simply impress his superiors and climb up the corporate ladder.

Throughout the game, Price is tasked with evicting three residents who are no longer able to pay their housing bills, the first of whom is an old woman. He struggles with an internal conflict between his job and his morals. The further he progresses with his tasks, the more he is consumed by guilt and horror-like visions.

== Development and release ==
Jesse Makkonen recalls releasing his debut game, Silence of the Sleep, in October 2014. Later, he started working on The Human Gallery, but faced multiple technical problems and paused development. Following his wife's suggestion, Makkonen decided to make a game for Halloween within the short time window of three months. According to him, the game was originally a happy platformer and eventually became something else, which he described as a fun transition. The creator made remarks about his creative process, including the decision for a more cartoonish art style for the sake of quicker progress.

The game was released on October 21, 2015, just before Halloween.

Makkonen realized the game's success and crafted a version for Android on November 27, 2016. The positive reception motivated him to release a port on April 19, 2017, for iOS. Later, he decided to work alongside Ratalaika Games to bring Distraint to consoles, but not the 2015 version. Makkonen opted for making a remaster of the game, planned for release in 2018 as DISTRAINT: Deluxe Edition for PlayStation 4, PlayStation Vita, Nintendo 3DS and Nintendo Switch, with a scheduled free update for Steam on September 29, 2017.

The new version included dynamic coloring, more environmental lighting, enhanced graphics and an improved user interface.

Ultimately, it was released for PlayStation 4 and PlayStation Vita (both in North America) on September 10, 2019. On September 11, North America received its Xbox One version; on the same day, the three ports just mentioned were all made available in Europe. The Nintendo Switch release occurred in both regions at the same time, on September 13.

== Themes ==
After the game's release, Makkonen talked about his vision for the story, stating that it was "all about Price's inner struggle" and not an anti-corporate message as it could be assumed. He also explained that the greedy and indifferent bosses were meant to highlight the protagonist's mental conflict.

== Reception ==
Reception

Aggregate score
Aggregator	Score	
Aggregator	NS	PC
Metacritic	70/100	76/100

Review scores
Publication	Score	
Publication	NS	PC
Adventure Gamers		3/5
Twinfinite		4/5

The PC version of the game has received "generally favorable reviews" on the review aggregator website Metacritic, while its Nintendo Switch version has received "mixed or average" reviews.

Adventure Gamers pointed out how the game rarely uses jumpscares, and instead focuses on creating a tense atmosphere with "slow-burning horror". They praised how the game's graphics, as well as the music, enhanced the dread. Meanwhile, their criticism focused on clunky inventory controls, overly simple puzzles and grammatical errors. Overall, they described it as "a modest but oddly compelling adventure steeped in perpetual darkness".

Chaz Miller, writing for Twinfinite, noted the game relied on tension, themes and its simple art style for creating its atmosphere, not on jumpscares. He also praised the story as "well-crafted", despite being "relatively short". He also criticized how some areas would start to feel "a bit repetitive" due to how the puzzles are designed.

== Sequel ==
On November 13, 2018, Makkonen released the sequel for the game, Distraint 2. The sequel, described as about "restoring hope and finding your purpose", is set directly after the ending of the first game.
