= Lakeview Cabin Collection =

2015 video game

- Steam Store logo
- Developer: Roope Tamminen
- Publisher: Roope Tamminen
- Engine: Unity
- Platforms: Microsoft Windows, MacOS, PlayStation 4, PlayStation 5, Xbox One, Xbox Series X/S
- Release: Windows, MacOS: WW: 25 March 2015; PS4, PS5, Xbox One, Series X/S: WW: 25 July 2024
- Mode: Single-player

Lakeview Cabin Collection is a horror-themed video game developed and published by Roope Tamminen. It is the sequel to his free flash game Lakeview Cabin, which released on 21 October 2013. In 2014, Tamminen announced that he was seeking to have the game released through Steam Greenlight and on 25 March 2015, Tamminen released the Lakeview Cabin Collection to Steam, Humble Bundle, and itch.io. Ports for PlayStation 4, PlayStation 5, Xbox One, and Xbox Series X/S were for 25 July 2024.

== Premise ==
The game's initial setting is a hub level set in a New York City movie theater, with a monstrous killer lurking in the sewers beneath a cinema. This level was formerly going to be Lakeview Cabin VI: Manhattan Lake Massacre, but Roope found it too small for a full length film and instead chose to turn it into the hub level and let Lakeview Cabin VI take its place from the seventh entry. Within the cinema, there are five "movies" that are playable games set elsewhere. Each film is centered on a different plot and a new set of playable protagonists, though the storylines are all connected and the movies take place in the same universe. The game references and borrows elements from classic horror movies such as Friday the 13th, The Hills Have Eyes, The Texas Chainsaw Massacre, Halloween, Alien, and The Thing.

- Lakeview Cabin III — Set around a decade after the original Lakeview Cabin flash game, a new group of counselors for Camp Lakeview unwittingly encounter a mysterious killer known as Babyface. Described as a "sandbox boss-fight". This game takes place at an idyllic-looking cabin surrounded by woods and a large lake. Players are able to control several characters and have them interact with their surroundings. Characters can swim, drink, handle objects, and have intercourse with one another, however during the night the characters are hunted and are able to be killed by their pursuer. Players can also kill the characters off themselves via several different methods.
- Lakeview Cabin IV: Curse of the Lake — After a rising girl band finds their tour bus out of gas, they must fight through a family of inbred cannibals, a swarm of mutant rats, and a vast array of traps hidden within Lakeview Manor. Described as a "randomized action survival".
- Lakeview Cabin V: Homecoming — On Halloween night, a small suburban neighborhood finds itself terrorized by an unkillable evil, and must resort to supernatural means to defeat it. Described as a "supernatural mystery".
- Lakeview Cabin VI — In a space station collecting remains of the original cabin, a handful of janitors find themselves face to face with multiplying alien creatures who can travel through the station's built-in delivery system.
- Epilogue (also called Lakeview Cabin II) — This game is far simpler than the ones mentioned above, and is unlocked when the previous four are completely finished. The epilogue's plot is vague, though it has been interpreted as the details of the events that took place that inspired the movies.

When each of the Lakeview Cabin movies and the epilogue are finished, there are minigames that can be played as well. The minigames alongside Lakeview Cabin III, IV, V, and VI are, respectively, Lake of the Dead, Treasure of the Vampire Rednecks, Super Dad, and Space Psychos. Additionally, in 2017, another minigame (unconnected to any of the other games) called Last Christmas became available. The playable protagonist is a father who must fend off Christmas-themed killers.

== Development ==
Tamminen initially began developing the game as a small prototype with similar mechanics as the 8-bit Nintendo game Chip 'n Dale Rescue Rangers and chose to turn it into a horror game. Prior to further developing the first game Tamminen sought his wife's approval to make a horror game, as she was pregnant at this time and the first game's antagonists were a pregnant woman and her unborn fetus. While the first game had more of a cartoon-esque look, Tamminen decided to make the further episodes in 8-bit style, as he felt that this made it easier for him as a solo developer.

Tamminen has stated that the game's puzzles "came almost naturally" as he "just added items that you might usually find at a cabin, and then tried to think of at least three ways to use them. The obvious use, the "self-harm" use and the use as a weapon."

== Reception ==
Critical reception of Lakeview Cabin Collection has been predominantly positive. Much of the game's praise centered upon its humor, sandbox game play, and easter eggs, while criticism centered upon the game's direction, mechanics, and lack of a tutorial.

== Sequels ==
On October 22, 2019, Tamminen released the game Lakeview Valley, which serves as a "spiritual successor" to Lakeview Cabin Collection and focuses on a customizable protagonist who arrives in the eponymous town. The game introduces a number of new characters while also featuring the return of characters familiar to the players of Tamminen's previous Lakeview games.

In 2020, Tamminen announced that he is developing Lakeview Cabin 2, which is a direct sequel to Lakeview Cabin Collection. The game was released later that year on 23 October, consisting of the hub level and first episode. The second and third episodes were released in April and December 2021, respectively. The fourth and final episode was released in October 2023 alongside the game's full release.
