= Last Year (video game) =

Asymmetric survival horror video game

- Developers: Elastic Games (2014–2022); Undaunted Games (2023–present)
- Publishers: Elastic Games (2014–2022); Undaunted Games (2023–present)
- Engine: Unreal Engine 4
- Platform: Windows
- Release: 18 December 2018 (Discord); 10 December 2019 (Steam)
- Genre: Survival horror
- Mode: Multiplayer

Last Year is an asymmetric survival horror video game developed by Canadian studio Elastic Games and currently owned by Undaunted Games. It was released for Microsoft Windows on 18 December 2018, distributed via Discord and later via Steam.

== Gameplay ==
Set in a high school in 1996, the game pits five Classmates against a Fiend who can switch between three of four characters: The Giant, The Slasher, The Spider and The Strangler. Classmates roam the map completing a variety of objectives in order to escape, while the Fiend tries to stop them from doing so. The Fiend is able to despawn and respawn outside the Classmates' line of sight with an ability called "predator mode". This mode also allows them to place traps for unsuspecting classmates.

== Development ==
=== Kickstarter ===
In late 2014 Elastic Games decided to open a Kickstarter to fund the game. The initial goal was 50,000 CA$ but they ended up receiving 114,711 CA$

=== 2016 ===
In 2016 the first version of Last Year alpha came to live and it was the first design of the game. Most of the things of this build did not make up to the end of the game, such as: Barricades, light traps, and wire traps.

=== 2017 ===
In this version of the alpha not too many things changed compared to the live version of the game but here are some of the things that were changed: -Fiends could actually interact with the environment, for example: You could break the generator from advancing or stop the bell tower escape gate from opening. -A workbench was added as an alternative to craft without a crafting kit. -In the final build of this alpha there was a progression build that allowed the classmates and fiends to gain exp. based in the actions that they made while playing the game.

=== 2018 ===
A trailer for Last Year: The Nightmare was released in September 2018.

=== Release ===
Last Year: The Nightmare had a closed beta period on 2–5 November 2018. The game was distributed "first on Discord" for 90 days, after which the game could also be distributed via other Windows game vendors.

=== 2019 ===
A re-launch, Last Year: Afterdark, was released on 10 December 2019 via Steam.

=== 2020 ===
Last Year: The Nightmare was released on 26 October 2020 via Steam.

=== Late 2021 ===
Due to the bankruptcy of Elastic Games, the game is no longer available on any platform and owners of the game cannot launch it.

=== 2022 ===
Due to the fact that the owners of the game cannot launch it, the development of the modification of Last Year: Resurrected began on August 11, 2022. The modification aims to bypass server checks as well as fixing up the code to be fully Peer to Peer without the reliance of game servers. The mod released as a public beta on March 24, 2023.

=== 2023 ===
On April 1, the Official Twitter account of Last Year became active again with a tweet revealing that the game will be back. It went free-to-play on Steam with a new company, Undaunted Games, replacing Elastic Games. The game was re-launched on May 4, 2023.

=== 2024 ===
Undaunted Games announced in early 2024 that Last Year will relaunch as Forest Hills: The Last Year on Steam later the same year. The relaunch will feature some new content, and the studio's creative team is joined by visual artist Andy Belanger, narrative writer Frank Tieri, and voice over director Sean Schemmel.

== Reception ==
Reception

Aggregate score
Aggregator	Score
Metacritic	73/100

Review scores
Publication	Score
Game Informer	7/10
IGN	7.3/10

Last Year: The Nightmare received mixed reviews from critics. On Metacritic, the game holds a score of 73/100 based on 10 reviews.

Jordan Devore of Destructoid praised the art direction of the game, saying it made matches "spontaneous and varied."
