= The Charnel House Trilogy =

2015 video game

- Developer: Owl Cave
- Publisher: Mastertronic Group
- Platform: Windows
- Release: WW: April 16, 2015
- Genre: Adventure
- Mode: Single-player

The Charnel House Trilogy is a 2015 adventure game developed by Owl Cave and published by Mastertronic Group. It comprises three connected stories that involve the supernatural.

== Gameplay ==
Three short point-and-click adventure games comprise The Charnel House Trilogy: Sepulchre, which was previously released as a standalone game; Inhale, a prequel to Sepulchre; and Exhale, a sequel. Inhale is about Alex Davenport and why she boards a train. Sepulchre is a ghost story about a doctor on the same train. Exhale completes Alex's story. Players interact with the characters and learn more about the characters' motivations. There are few puzzles.

== Development ==
Mastertronic Group released The Charnel House Trilogy for Windows on April 16, 2015.

== Reception ==
The Charnel House Trilogy received mixed reviews on Metacritic. Rock Paper Shotgun found Inhale to have too many immersion-breaking inside jokes. Sepulchre, which the reviewer previously enjoyed, felt weaker coming back Inhale. Exhale, to them, felt like a tonal mismatch with its focus on teen horror. However, Rock Paper Shotgun praised the trilogy's art and score. GameSpot criticized Inhale for having "out-of-place humor" and puzzles that did not seem to follow its story. They felt Sepulchre lacked subtlety, but they enjoyed Exhale and Alex's character growth. They concluded that the trilogy has a "mishmash of themes and tones". Adventure Gamers recommended it to "anyone who values atmospheric storytelling over gameplay", though they disliked the ending, which they said felt like a cop-out. RPGFan called it "short but highly repeatable" and recommended it to players who like to think about and try to piece together vague stories. According to Paste, the stories are at their best when they are open-ended and weird, but it is much weaker when it begins providing answers.
