= Pandorum (video game) =

2009 video game

- Developer: Artificial Life, Inc.
- Publishers: Artificial Life, Inc.
- Platform: iPhone/iPod Touch OS 3.0+
- Release: September 15, 2009
- Genre: 3D third-person adventure
- Mode: Single-player

Pandorum is an adventure game for the iPhone and iPod Touch based on Starz Media's science fiction horror film of the same name, Pandorum. The game was developed by Artificial Life, Inc. and launched on September 15, 2009 for $3.99 on Apple's App Store just prior to the movie's debut in theaters in the United States on September 25, 2009.

== Gameplay ==
In Pandorum, players control the game's main character, Corporal Bower, on his quest to explore different parts of the spaceship Elysium in a 360-degree 3D view. The game uses dual stick controls to move and look around. Buttons on the screen allow players to attack and to switch weapons as well as to access various menus.

The game consists of 5 missions in which players must solve puzzles and defeat various monsters in order to advance through the game. Weapons, healing items and other bonus items are scattered throughout the spaceship and must be retrieved during Corporal Bower's journey. Included in the overall game is a mini-game puzzle that involves connecting electrical circuits by creating the correct path which when solved will provide the charge to unlock certain doors.

Throughout the game, up to 10 medals are awarded based on performance during missions. Upgrade packages are also available in the game for weapon upgrades, unlimited ammo and a more protective suit for Corporal Bower.

== Plot ==
The goal of the game is to escape the spaceship and reveal its secrets in order to save the human race. The story is told through cutscenes as well as journal entries that can be found in the ship.

== Reviews ==
Reception

Review scores
Publication	Score
TouchMyApps	Grab It
TouchGen	3.5/5
Mobile Game FAQS	82/100

- Tracy Erickson (Sept 26 2009) Pandorum (iPhone)
- Roger Moore (Sept 27 2009) Pandorum
- Daniel (Sept 17 2009) Pandorum Review: Shooting Yourself in the Foot
- Kirk Hiner (Oct 28 2009) Appletell Reviews Pandorum for iPhone and iPod Touch
- Colin Boyd (Sept 18 2009) New ‘Pandorum’ Game for iPhone and iPod Touch
