= Paratopic =

2018 video game

- Steam cover art
- Developer: Arbitrary Metric
- Publisher: Arbitrary Metric
- Designer: Jessica Harvey
- Writer: Doc Burford
- Composer: Lazzie Brown
- Platforms: Linux, macOS, Windows, Nintendo Switch, Xbox One, Xbox Series X/S
- Release: Linux, macOS, Windows; March 12, 2018; Nintendo Switch; August 21, 2020; Xbox One, Xbox Series X/S; May 13, 2022
- Mode: Single-player

Paratopic is a 2018 first-person video game, released for Linux, macOS, Windows, Nintendo Switch, Xbox One and Xbox Series X/S. The game uses a graphical style reminiscent of 32-bit era graphics. Later that year, a "Definitive Cut" edition added new locations and objects. Paratopic won the "Excellence in Audio" category at the 2019 Independent Games Festival Awards.

== Development ==
Paratopic was developed with a very low budget by Arbitrary Metric, a team of three - Doc Burford, Jessica Harvey, and Lazzie Brown. Harvey describes their tool set of Unity, Visual Studio, GIMP and Blender as the "no money special". The script was written in Twine before imported into Unity. Brown, who was responsible for the audio, used Reason and Audacity.

Burford described the design of the game as partly a response to weaknesses he saw in the walking simulator genre, he wanted to introduce more player actions, and populate the world with more life compared to the empty environments of Dear Esther and Gone Home. During development, poverty became a main theme of the game; with characters worried about debt and the faltering economy, and the environment reflecting the slow decline of Burford's home town. Every facet of the game was designed to invoke a feeling of dread using a "show, don't tell" style.

The game was originally released through itch.io in March 2018. The developers preferred itch.io over Steam due to its lower fees, and believed that the itch audience were more receptive to smaller, experimental games. In September 2018, an expanded Definitive Cut of the game was released, including new locations and objects. This version was offered on Steam as well as itch.io. The game was later ported to the Nintendo Switch and Xbox One by Baltoro Games and released in 2020 and 2022 respectively.

On June 7th, 2025, Arbitrary Metric revealed Paratopic: Overdub at the end of the trailer for the studio's upcoming game Roman Sands RE:Build. Promotional material refers to the game as a "remaster, remix, and sequel to the original." No release date was given.

== Plot ==
The game is presented as short gameplay segments with stories that connect vaguely to each other that frequently and abruptly shift. The narrative is shown out of order in-game. The following is a summarization of the order as the story segments appear.

In a hallway-like building, an unnamed Smuggler is interrogated about possessing undeclared videotapes by a security guard. The guard goes into a room to watch some of the tapes. The room becomes enveloped in a blinding white light. The game abruptly shifts to a diner. An unnamed female Assassin is instructed to retrieve videotapes for her employer. Outside, a corpse can be seen being eaten by birds. She is told to smuggle them across a "border" once she retrieves them. Now alone in the diner, the Assassin, armed with a revolver, kicks open a door in the back of the diner, revealing a man standing next to a mysterious symbol. The game abruptly cuts to an apartment complex. A person (ostensibly the Smuggler), en route to their apartment, is told by a neighbor that she witnessed a group of men breaking into the Smuggler's apartment. Inside the Smuggler's apartment is a lamp, numerous boxes filled with what appears to be liquified flesh, a bare mattress, and a box, adorned with the same symbol from the diner, filled with videotapes. The Smuggler's neighbor abruptly appears, requesting a "juicy" videotape. It is left up to the player as to whether the Smuggler gives her a tape or not. If the neighbor is given a tape, she is seen watching it in her room, only for her face to split open.

The game abruptly cuts to a person (again, ostensibly, the Smuggler) driving a car down a deserted city highway. In the passenger seat, a revolver and the videotape box frequently change places on the seat. The game abruptly cuts to a gas station mini-mart. The Smuggler makes small talk with the mini-mart cashier while their car gets gas. Outside, a monstrous, dark figure stands over the car. The game abruptly cuts to an unnamed female Birdwatcher, armed with a camera, walking through a forest, taking pictures of crows. The Birdwatcher stumbles upon a clearing, witnessing a massive dome-like structure in the distance, as well as a windmill that bears a strong resemblance to the windmill in the diner symbol. In a completely missable area, the Birdwatcher discovers an underground room with multiple television screens, which play a fragmented recording of a man from the enigmatic "Power Company". The man addresses an unknown group of people (ostensibly his coworkers) and the "sacrifices" they make for the sake of a "better future". After discovering a cliffside trail, the game cuts to the Smuggler, in the car again. The Smuggler leaves the city and enters a countryside-like area. The game then cuts back to the Birdwatcher, who wanders through an area filled with mangled and ruined metallic structures and shipping crates. The shipping crates are marked with the symbol from the diner. There are active security cameras that appear to be watching the birdwatcher. Eventually, the Birdwatcher stumbles upon a radio tower, beneath which is a black, monstrous creature that warps and distorts the Birdwatcher's camera feed. The monster then teleports behind the Birdwatcher and attacks her.

The game then cuts to the Smuggler, in the car once more, as they drive through the countryside. Numerous destroyed and mangled objects can be seen in the background. The game then cuts to the gas station. The Smuggler, apparently there a second time, again makes conversation with the mini-mart cashier while their car fills up with gas. The dark creature can again be seen beside the car. The game then cuts back to the Assassin as they break into the diner's back room. She kills the man, who was watching some of the tapes she was hired to retrieve. She watches one herself. The television screen she views it on displays nothing but static, but the Assassin is moved back in time to the moment she kills the man every time she views a tape. The game then abruptly cuts back to the scene that was playing out at the start of the game. The security guard walks out of the room, but a flickering television is in the place of his head and he appears to be nearly bisected. His body then unravels and vanishes into thin air, leaving only the television, which displays the message "BE SEEING YOU, FRIENDO." The game then abruptly cuts to the Assassin, armed with her revolver, walking through the forest where the Birdwatcher was. The Assassin stumbles upon the Birdwatcher's skinless, headless, warped, still-moving body, wrapped around a pole, with the camera the Birdwatcher had at the foot of the pole. The Assassin takes the camera. The game ends with the Assassin reporting the Birdwatcher's body to emergency services via telephone, hanging up when the operator asks for the Assassin's name.

== Reception ==
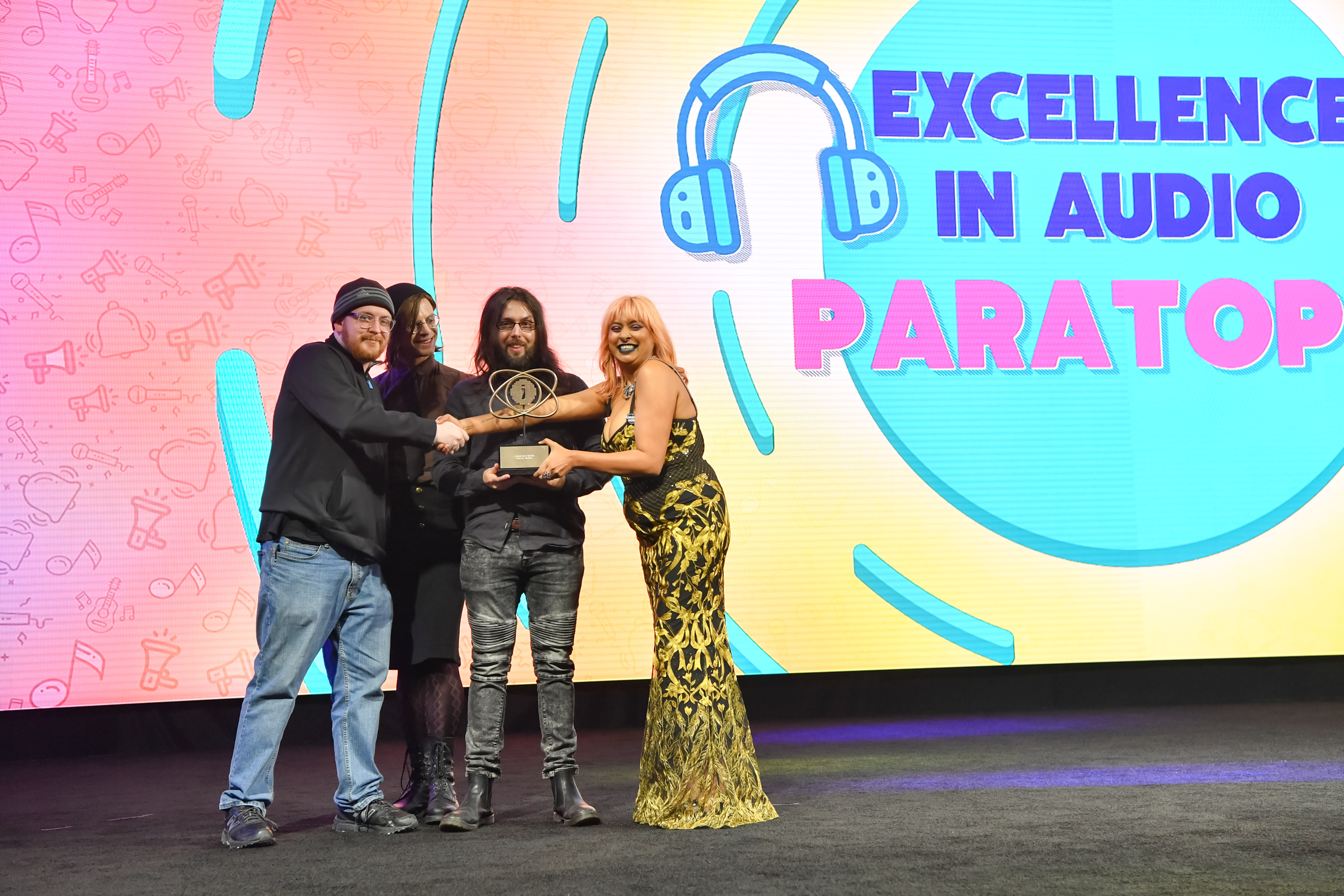
Arbitrary Metric receives the Excellence in Audio award at the 2019 Independent Games Festival.

Paratopic was positively received on its initial 2018 release. Rock, Paper, Shotgun listed it as one of their twenty-four best games of 2018, and their writer Nic Reuben had it in his personal top five. Bloody Disgusting writer Andrew King featured the game in a Best of 2018 editorial. At the 2019 Independent Games Festival, it was shortlisted for the Nuovo Award, and won the award for Excellence in Audio. Fact magazine listed Paratopic as having one of the 10 best video game soundtracks of 2018, comprising "industrial compositions full of smudgy beats and corroding '80s synths" that match the game's "visual and narrative dread ".

In 2019, Burford said that while proceeds from Paratopic's sales allowed him to move out of the family home, and exposed him to more video games freelancing opportunities, he still could not afford medical insurance.

Later reviews were more mixed, the Xbox version received a score of 60/100 on reviews aggregation website Metacritic based on 4 reviews. While critics praised the visuals and the game's tense, unnerving atmosphere, criticism fell on the game's short length, the story's abrupt ending, and monotonous gameplay segments.
