= Teleglitch =

2013 video game

- Developer: Test3 Projects
- Publisher: Paradox Interactive
- Platforms: Windows; Mac OS X Linux
- Release: November 2012 (initial release); 24 July 2013 (Die More Edition)
- Genre: Action
- Mode: Single-player

Teleglitch is a game developed by Test3 Projects, a rogue-like action and indie game incorporating features of survival horror. After initial release, a version incorporating free expansion content was released through Paradox as the Die More Edition.

== Gameplay ==
Teleglitch puts the player in the role of a scientist at a military technology research station on a distant planet, lone survivor of a disaster that claimed the lives of the other inhabitants. It is played from a top-down point of view, requiring the player to dodge and shoot in all directions while defending themselves against the monsters and robots that were being developed at the station. As players advance through the game they can collect different weapons and items, many of which can be combined into new weapons and tools to aid the player. Similar to the stealth game Monaco: What's Yours is Mine, players can only see what is in their character's line of sight, with level details being revealed from the shadows as they move through an area.

Each level features a different part of the base, but the layout of each level is randomly varied on each playthrough, requiring the player to adapt to the different layouts as they're unable to learn standard routes through the levels.

== Reception ==
Reception

Aggregate score
Aggregator	Score
Metacritic	84/100 (Die More Edition) 78/100

Review scores
Publication	Score
Destructoid	8.5/10
Edge	7/10
IGN	7.8/10

Teleglitch received positive reviews from critics. PC Gamer referred to it as a "sophisticated, thrilling, and occasionally brutal shooter", and Rock Paper Shotgun noted it as "one of the best games of 2013." It has an aggregate score of 84/100 on Metacritic. Criticism focused particularly on the game's difficulty level, which can require repeated play-throughs in order to progress.
