= Halloween: The Game =

2026 video game

- Developer: IllFonic
- Publishers: IllFonic; Gun Interactive
- Composers: John Carpenter; Mark Rutherford
- Series: Halloween
- Engine: Unreal Engine 5
- Platforms: PlayStation 5; Windows; Xbox Series X/S
- Release: WW: September 8, 2026
- Genres: Survival horror, stealth
- Modes: Single-player, multiplayer

Halloween: The Game is a multiplayer survival horror game developed by IllFonic and published by IllFonic and Gun Interactive. It is based on the 1978 film Halloween and was released on September 8, 2026, for PlayStation 5, Windows, and Xbox Series X and Series S. The game received generally mixed reviews upon release, with praise for its gameplay and atmosphere, though some criticized it for its technical issues.

== Gameplay ==
Halloween: The Game is a stealth and survival horror game with both single-player and multiplayer modes. The multiplayer mode is a one-versus-four asymmetrical horror mode in which one player controls Michael Myers, while four players control civilians in Haddonfield.

As Michael, players stalk and kill civilians while using stealth and abilities such as Shape Jump to move through the map and strike unexpectedly. Civilian players must warn residents, scavenge weapons and supplies, guide non-player characters to safety, and contact the police before time runs out. Michael can be knocked down or detained by police, but cannot be killed.

The single-player story mode is played from Michael's perspective and is designed to introduce mechanics used in multiplayer. IllFonic chief creative officer Jared Gerritzen said the campaign would include events from the original film and additional story material set around that night.

== Premise ==
The game takes place in Haddonfield on Halloween night in 1978, and as residents prepare for the holiday, Michael Myers returns home. Players either control Michael as he stalks the town or control Haddonfield residents attempting to save their neighbors from him.

== Development ==
In August 2024, Boss Team Games announced that two Halloween franchise video games were in development, including one being developed in Unreal Engine 5 with involvement from John Carpenter. When IllFonic's game was announced in 2025, GameSpot noted that it was unclear whether it was the same project previously reported as being connected to Boss Team Games.

Halloween: The Game was revealed during Gamescom in August 2025. The game is developed by IllFonic, the studio behind licensed multiplayer horror games including Friday the 13th: The Game and Predator: Hunting Grounds. The project reunites IllFonic with Gun Interactive, with whom it had previously worked on Friday the 13th: The Game.

The development team worked with Carpenter and longtime Halloween franchise producer Malek Akkad. According to Gerritzen, the team designed the game as a period piece, with the visual style, dialogue, and available in-game technology reflecting the 1970s setting. The game is being developed in Unreal Engine 5. Chelsea Rebecca, best known for the Dead Meat Podcast, is the voice of Judith Myers.

== Marketing and release ==
The game was announced for PlayStation 5, Windows, and Xbox Series X/S in August 2025, without a release date. Its gameplay and September 8, 2026 release date were revealed during a State of Play presentation in September 2025.

IllFonic and Gun Interactive revealed the Haddonfield Heights multiplayer map in December 2025. A multiplayer overview was released in March 2026, showing Michael Myers and civilian gameplay. A second map, Haddonfield Town Center, was revealed in June 2026. A third map, Orange Grove Estates, was revealed in July 2026.

On August 10, 2026, the official X account for Halloween: The Game confirmed that the game had been refused classification by the Australian Classification Board, and as a result will not be made available to players in Australia and supposedly by the account, New Zealand. The statement claimed that the presence of a controlled substance is behind the refusal, which online commenters (after getting an email back from director Steven Thomson on 7 September 2026) have described links to the use of marijuana in the game as a power-up often displaying with text on the screen as a "Joint" with an image of a smoking cigarette that highlights Michael's present location in a match. On August 14, 2026, ACB states that the title contains illicit drug use that is linked to an incentive or reward, in that use of the drug provides a gameplay advantage to the player, and the official X account clarified that the game will be released in New Zealand digitally, as they learned that the ACB rating (used for physical) took precedence over the International Age Rating Coalition rating (used for digital) when they partnered with physical distributors to sell packaged goods in both countries. On August 30, 2026, the X account announced the PlayStation 5 release in Japan was cancelled due to the studio's inability to obtain a domestic rating from the Computer Entertainment Rating Organization for the title's visceral violence and nudity. This is because Japanese Sony Interactive Entertainment demands for a CERO rating for games rated 18+ by IARC. The digital versions of the Xbox and PC ports was still released uncensored in Japan on September 9, 2026.

In the first published version, the game had a minigame where civilians could have sexual intercourse for buffs. The minigame was removed in a hotfix for unknown reasons. Some media outlets speculated that the removal was due to older characters such as Samuel Loomis unintentionally being able to have sex with characters below the age of 18.

== Reception ==
Reception

Aggregate scores
Aggregator	Score
Metacritic	(PC) 71/100 (PS5) 65/100 (XSXS) 59/100
OpenCritic	33% recommend

Review scores
Publication	Score
GameSpot	8/10
Shacknews	7/10

Halloween: The Game received "mixed" reviews, according to review aggregator Metacritic. OpenCritic determined that 33% of critics recommended the game.

== Comic adaptation ==
On November 4, 2026, PANICK Entertainment released the first issue of Halloween: The Game Comic, which was written by Hans Rodionoff and Adam F. Goldberg. The comic was in partnership with IllFonic, Compass International Pictures, and Further Front.

== See also ==
- List of horror video games
- Dead by Daylight
- Evil Dead: The Game
- Friday the 13th: The Game
- Identity V
- Killer Klowns from Outer Space: The Game
- Predator: Hunting Grounds
- Propnight
- The Texas Chainsaw Massacre
