= Ghostbusters: Spirits Unleashed =

2022 video game

- Developer: IllFonic
- Publisher: IllFonic (Note: Managed since June 2026 by Balor Games.)
- Series: Ghostbusters
- Engine: Unreal Engine 4
- Platforms: Microsoft Windows; Nintendo Switch; PlayStation 4; PlayStation 5; Xbox One; Xbox Series X/S
- Release: October 18, 2022; Nintendo Switch: October 19, 2023
- Genres: Action, first-person shooter
- Modes: Single-player, multiplayer

Ghostbusters: Spirits Unleashed is a 2022 asymmetrical action game developed and published by IllFonic. Based on the Ghostbusters franchise, it is set after the events of the 2021 film Ghostbusters: Afterlife and focuses on players tackling matches either as a ghostbuster trying to capture ghosts, or a ghost trying to haunt a location. It was released for Microsoft Windows, PlayStation 4, PlayStation 5, Xbox One and Xbox Series X/S in October 2022. A Nintendo Switch port was released on October 19, 2023.

== Gameplay ==
Spirits Unleashed focuses on online multiplayer gameplay for up to five players, focusing on 4v1 matches with asymmetrical gameplay. Each player is able to create their own Ghostbuster avatar, with the Ghostbusters' headquarters acting as a hub between matches where players can change their avatar's appearance, clothing and voice, as well as manage items and upgrades they have unlocked. At times, players will also be required to visit certain areas of the hub to progress events in the game's storyline. Matches – dubbed as "jobs" – are initiated at the hub and can be set to a specific location or a random choice, with players able to designate whether they prefer to play as a ghostbuster, or be chosen to control a ghost in the match; players may also opt to let an AI bot control the ghost for the match.

In a match, the goal for each side is specific: the ghost's aim is to haunt the selected location and avoid being captured; while the ghostbusters must focus on trapping the ghost, with the option of closing rifts to reduce the ghost's chance of success, but must do so before the ghost can fully haunt a location. If a ghost manages to fully haunt a location, a countdown timer begins, and the Ghostbusters will be required to close down any active rifts and capture the ghost before it runs out, otherwise they lose the match. Each side functions differently during a match, with the ghost working on their own and using a combination of stealth and sabotage techniques against their opponents, while the Ghostbusters must use teamwork, co-ordination, and a variety of gadgets to defeat the ghost. Both sides earn experience for their equipment/abilities, while at the end of the match, players earn experience towards their overall level, which reaching certain thresholds will unlock new ghosts and appearances, and new items for use in matches and customising their avatar's appearance. Additional experience can also be earned by completing daily and weekly challenges focused on different tasks, such as destroying bins, or completing a set number of matches.

The ghost is controlled from a third-person perspective, and must focus on haunting a location by causing mischief in each room, while avoiding detection and capture for as long as possible. Each ghost that the player can access has different strengths and weakenesses, which can affect how they can be utilized in a match. The ghost can use special abilities that can summon small minions to assist in haunting a location and sprint around a location, as well as slime Ghostbusters to disable them temporarily and sabotage their proton packs. For most of the time, the ghost must use interactive objects - such as stools, bins, and cleaning buckets - to either hide in and avoid detection, which can also allow them to recuperate energy that was spent on abilities, or to haunt them and cause havoc as well as to divert their opponents. They can also scare AI civilians, even possessing them, which can cause havoc for the ghostbusters and further improve their chance of success. Ghosts can resist the tether effect of the Ghostbuster's proto pack, but will be captured if they are drawn into a trap; however, if any rifts are still active in the match, the ghost will respawn at the cost of a rift being closed.

The Ghostbusters are controlled from a first-person perspective, and rely on a proton pack for capturing ghosts - which must be vented if fired for long periods – and a PKE meter to locate them – with the added bonus of an AoE attack that stun ghosts and damage rifts. In addition to their standard equipment, the Ghostbusters can also make use of different gadgets, being able to utilize only one at a time but with the ability to switch to another via a gear cart spawned at the team's starting position. Most of the time, players in the ghostbuster team need to focus on the PKE meter to find the ghost and their rifts (which only become visible when exposed), as well as calm down AI civilians wandering the location; frightened civilians fleeing the location will knock out any ghostbusters in their path. During a match, players can collect fungus scattered around a location, which provide an experience bonus for those who collect them. When capturing the ghost, the team must co-ordinate their efforts, laying down a trap and tethering a ghost towards it. If any member is slimed completely, they can either clean themselves or be aided by another to revive them.

== Plot ==
Following the events of Ghostbusters: Afterlife, Ghostbuster founders Raymond "Ray" Stantz and Winston Zeddemore re-establish the Ghostbusters, with the latter acquiring and reopening the organization's old headquarters in a New York firehouse. Believing a new generation is needed to tackle the paranormal and occult, the pair recruit two new members to serve as staff members at the headquarters – Catt, the new co-ordinator and assistant; and Eddy, a technological genius assigned to lab work and research. The group soon begin recruiting a new selection of rookies to serve as Ghostbusters, shortly before Ray takes delivery of an occult relic known as the Spirit Guide, written by John Horace Tobin – a researcher of the occult, with whom Ray is fascinated.

After conducting a few jobs, the new Ghostbusters are tasked with checking in on a package from Ray and Winston's close friend Peter Venkman, which turns out to be an old ghost trap that no one at the firehouse can account for. Tasked with using it on the ghost containment unit, the trap suddenly malfunctions before a mysterious force known as "The Nameless" escapes and possesses Winston. Concerned for his friend, Ray and the others order the Nameless to exit his body, only to find something has tethered it to Winston. Eddy soon works to find a way to separate the pair, but his efforts backfire and cause the Nameless to open a rift into the realm of ghosts. With further research into the matter, Eddy advises the Ghostbusters to enter the rift and determine if they can find something beyond it that can free Winston.

Inside the rift, the Ghostbusters come across the spirit form of Tobin as his book - which had awakened and been creating rifts for ghosts to use - who is shocked to discover their presence. Although wishing them to leave, he allows the Ghostbusters to learn that the leather binding of the Spirit Guide, which they removed, is key to freeing Winston. Returning to the living world, Eddy uses this knowledge to create the necessary means to liberate Winston and entrap the Nameless. Satisfied with how the rookie Ghostbusters performed, Ray and Winston officially recognize them as a fully fledged Ghostbuster, with Catt supplying them a new outfit. Before Winston and Ray can treat them to a celebration meal, Catt receives call of a new job, which the Ghostbusters promptly attend to.

=== Ecto Edition ===
An updated version, the Ecto Edition, was released in 2023. The additional material, which sees Ray, Winston and the new Ghostbusters face off against Samhain while preparing for the Spengler family's upcoming visit to New York City (leading into the events of Ghostbusters: Frozen Empire) was included with the Switch version and was made available as downloadable content for the PC, PS4, PS5, and Xbox One/Series X|S versions.

== Development and release ==
IllFonic, which had previously worked on Friday the 13th: The Game and Predator: Hunting Grounds, served as the game's lead developer. Spirits Unleashed was first teased by IllFonic's studio head Raphael Saadiq in October 2021. The game was officially announced in March 2022, and was released on the Epic Games Store for Microsoft Windows, PlayStation 4, PlayStation 5, Xbox One and Xbox Series X/S on October 18, 2022.

The game features the likenesses and voices of Ernie Hudson as Winston Zeddemore and Dan Aykroyd as Ray Stantz. In June 2023, it was announced that Ghostbusters: Spirits Unleashed – Ecto Edition would be released later in 2023 for Nintendo Switch. The announcement trailer also teased the addition of Samhain to the game in a DLC leading into the events of Ghostbusters: Frozen Empire.

In March 2024, Illfonic revealed a Year Two roadmap with content to be released seasonally throughout the rest of the year. Content includes a “Frozen Empire” tie-in pack, variant Slimer Skins, as well as new ghosts, cosmetics and more.

== Reception ==
Reception

Aggregate score
Aggregator	Score
Metacritic	PC: 69/100; PS5: 68/100; XSXS: 74/100

Review scores
Publication	Score
Destructoid	8/10
Game Informer	7.75/10
GameSpot	6/10
Hardcore Gamer	3.5/5
IGN	6/10
PC Gamer (US)	55/100
Shacknews	9/10

Ghostbusters: Spirits Unleashed received "mixed or average" reviews according to review aggregator Metacritic.
