= Friday the 13th: The Game =

2017 survival horror video game

- Developer: IllFonic (Note: Since September 2018, Black Tower Studios took the lead on support and development on the game.)
- Publisher: Gun Media
- Director: David Langeliers
- Producer: Bryce Glover
- Designer: Dan Russet
- Programmer: Paul Jackson
- Artists: Cole Gray; Shane Stoneman
- Composer: Harry Manfredini
- Series: Friday the 13th
- Engine: Unreal Engine 4
- Platforms: Windows; PlayStation 4; Xbox One; Nintendo Switch
- Release: Windows, PlayStation 4, Xbox One; May 26, 2017; Nintendo Switch; August 13, 2019
- Genre: Survival horror
- Mode: Multiplayer

Friday the 13th: The Game is a 2017 asymmetrical survival horror game developed by IllFonic and published by Gun Media. It is based on the Friday the 13th franchise. The game was released on May 26, 2017, as a digital release, and later released on October 13, 2017, as a physical release, for PlayStation 4 and Xbox One. A Nintendo Switch version was released on August 13, 2019. As of January 1, 2025, the game is no longer playable online.

Friday the 13th: The Game pits up to seven players controlling Camp Crystal Lake counselors against one player controlling Jason Voorhees. It is a semi-open world game, with players able to explore it further.

== Gameplay ==
Pre-alpha gameplay screenshot

Friday the 13th: The Game was a semi-open world third-person survival horror game set throughout the 1980s in a variety of locations in and around the fictional Camp Crystal Lake from the Friday the 13th franchise.

The game was an asymmetrical multiplayer video game, with up to eight people able to play in one game session. One player is randomly selected to control Jason Voorhees whose objective is to kill as many counselors as possible before time runs out. Playing as Jason grants special time-restricted abilities including being able to sense nearby counselors and to teleport anywhere on the map. The remaining players control the counselors, who can temporarily stun Jason using firecrackers and bear traps as well as the various projectile and melee-based weapons that are found throughout the map. A player on the counselor's side may also control Tommy Jarvis, who becomes playable when certain conditions are met. The main objective of playing as a counselor is to escape the map alive, which can be done more quickly by completing the map's side objectives (which are easier to complete when coordinating with other players) that will allow counselors to escape or to survive long enough until time runs out on the session. Jason may also be killed with an "epic win condition" that requires both teamwork and planning, and is difficult to perform. To kill Jason, a female character is needed to find Jason's shack, don the sweater of Pamela Voorhees, and claim she is Jason's mother in front of him if his mask has been knocked off, distracting him as Tommy attacks Jason.

Although the game was originally planned to be multiplayer only, a single-player mode via an update was announced for a Summer 2017 release, despite the stretch goal for US$1.625 million to unlock it not being reached. The mode consists of objective-based missions that allow the player to take control of Jason against offline camp counselor bots. Some of the missions are adaptations of the films, while others are original scenarios.

On October 27, 2017, Gun released a trailer teasing a new game mode called Paranoia. However, on February 1, 2018, it was announced that development on Paranoia mode would be put on hold to focus on the new dedicated servers feature.

On December 31, 2024, the servers for Friday the 13th: The Game were shut down, marking the end of the game entirely.

=== Settings ===
Five primary maps are available, each of which are based on locations from the first five films, and each set concurrent with the films' time periods. Matches may take place at Camp Crystal Lake, the setting of the first film, in 1980; Packanack Lodge, the setting of the second film, in 1981; Higgins Haven, the setting of the third film, in 1982; the Jarvis House, the setting of the fourth film, in 1984; and Pinehurst, the setting of the fifth film, in 1985.

Camp Crystal Lake, Higgins Haven, and Packanack Lodge were the original available maps, while the Jarvis House and Pinehurst were made available in October 2017 and January 2018, respectively.

== Characters ==
The game's primary killer is Jason Voorhees, the series' most recurring antagonist. Nine different versions of Jason are playable, based on his appearances from the second, third, fourth, sixth, seventh, eighth, and ninth films, and make-up artist Tom Savini's own Jason created exclusively for backers of the game. Roy Burns, the Jason copycat killer from the fifth film, is also playable under the moniker "Part V Jason". In addition to the distinct versions of Jason, the version from the third film has an alternate model based on his appearance from the NES game. Each Jason has his own strengths and weaknesses and many have different weapons.

There are fourteen playable counselors in the game, each of whom have their own strengths and weaknesses. Original counselors created for the game are A.J. Mason, Adam Palomino, Brandon "Buggzy" Wilson, Chad Kensington, Deborah Kim, Eric "J.R." LaChappa, Jenny Myers, Kenny Riedell, Mitch Floyd, Tiffany Cox, Vanessa Jones, and Victoria Sterling. From the films are Part III characters Sheldon "Shelly" Finkelstein and Fox.

Also playable is Thomas "Tommy" Jarvis, the protagonist of the fourth, fifth, and sixth films, who assists the counselors when contacted from a randomly placed CB radio. He is controlled by a randomly selected player on the counselors' side whose previous character was either killed or escaped. In addition to having perfect statistics and being immediately equipped with a shotgun, pocket knife, and first aid spray, Tommy is the only character capable of killing Jason.

== Development ==
After IllFonic's polarized 2012 remake of Nexuiz and Gun Media's Breach & Clear: Deadline in 2015, IllFonic went to work on a game titled Slasher Vol. 1: Summer Camp, with little details on its release date with Gun, in which the story took place in Camp Forest Green. Friday the 13th director Sean S. Cunningham was in talks about an upcoming game based on Friday the 13th with Gun. It is also the first video game IllFonic has developed with Unreal Engine 4, departing from CryEngine after the announcement of Project Advena.

Sean [S. Cunningham] came to us in early 2015, but we quickly discovered these weren't the normal business conversations you would have when you try to secure a license as important as Friday the 13th. It was totally different. It was a conversation built on mutual admiration and respect for what each had created. Sean immediately noticed the passion we had for Friday the 13th, and after several incredible meetings over the next few months, we decided to upgrade our plans for Summer Camp and embrace the Friday the 13th video game license. After several incredible meetings over the next few months, Sean surprised us by offering the Friday the 13th video game license.

Executive director and producer Randy Greenback organized both a Kickstarter campaign and a BackerKit campaign to fund the game's development. Overall, US$422,866 was raised by 18,068 backers in BackerKit and about US$823,704.20 from 12,128 backers in Kickstarter, collecting about US$1,246,570.20 from both platforms, becoming the 179th most crowdfunded project of all time.

On October 13, 2015, it was announced that Slasher Vol. 1: Summer Camp had evolved into Friday the 13th: The Game, with an announcement trailer released by Gun on their YouTube channel the same day. On Halloween, Harry Manfredini uploaded a video to the Gun YouTube channel with files on his computer monitor being partially seen, implying that he was composing music for the game.

On November 4, Gun released fly-through shots of the game's environment while in pre-alpha development. On November 10, IllFonic posted a video on Gun's YouTube channel, which highlighted testing and development for the game, including 3D modeling for Jason.

On February 25, 2016, Gun and IllFonic released camera footage showing stunt coordinator Kane Hodder, who portrays Jason, with Tarah Paige and Ryan Staats, the two actors who will play the men and women counselors in the game, performing motion capture at Digital Domain. The footage shows Hodder performing a list of kill animations for the game, with rigged placeholder characters used to track the kills and animations in real-time. This was soon reuploaded by Bloody Disgusting in the same day.

A developer panel for Gun Media and IllFonic was opened at PAX South 2016 in January with alpha footage and a list of kill animations, with gameplay released at E3 2016 in June.

On September 2, 2016, Gun released the PAX West trailer for the game, titled "XIII". The trailer showcased Jason Voorhees' kill animations specifically designed by Tom Savini, while set to "XIII" (pronounced "ex triple I") by Crazy Lixx.

=== Casting ===
Several actors from the Friday the 13th films reprised their roles in the game. Motion capture for Jason Voorhees and Roy Burns was provided by Kane Hodder, who portrayed Jason in The New Blood, Jason Takes Manhattan, Jason Goes to Hell, and Jason X, and is the only actor to play the character more than once. Cast as Tommy Jarvis was Thom Mathews, who played Tommy in Jason Lives, and the character is modeled after Mathews' appearance in the film. Larry Zerner, who appeared in Part III as Shelly, reprised the role when the character was added to the game in December 2017. Also featured are the likenesses of Part III actress Gloria Charles as her character Fox and A New Beginning actor Dick Wieand as his character Roy Burns.

The original counselor characters were voiced by Zeno Robinson as Brandon "Buggzy" Wilson, Benjamin Diskin as Chad Kensington and Eric "J.R." LaChappa, Cristina Vee as Deborah Kim, Kristina Klebe as Jenny Myers, Marisha Ray as A.J. Mason, Cherami Leigh as Tiffany Cox, Robbie Daymond as Adam Palomino and Kenny Riedell, and Noveen Crumbie as Vanessa Jones. The male counselors were motion-captured by Ryan Staats and the female counselors were motion-captured by Tarah Paige. Jennifer Ann Burton voiced Pamela Voorhees, whose voice is heard encouraging Jason's player during the game and in a collection of unlockable tapes.

=== Virtual Cabin ===
On June 30, 2016, IllFonic previewed a 3D development diary to complement behind-the-scenes interviews, footage, and in-development stock called the "Virtual Cabin". Besides overviews, the Cabin has item rooms that house information upon characters, scenes, or easter eggs. An item room called the "Jason Room" was unlocked on July 18, 2016 and a room containing the main counselors was unlocked on August 12, 2016.

On December 18, 2017, a Virtual Cabin 2.0 was added to the main game. It features much more Easter eggs and is at a much larger scale than the previous cabin. Completing all the challenges reveals confirmation of the addition of Uber Jason and a map depicting the spaceship Grendel from the film Jason X coming soon. However, this was officially canceled in a statement from Gun Media due to a rights lawsuit involving Sean S. Cunningham and Victor Miller in which Gun Media representative Wes Keltner stated: "Is there a chance of any content being added to the game if a ruling on the dispute occurs in the near future? The answer is no. We can't keep building content that may never see the light of day. That's bad business."

== Soundtrack ==
Harry Manfredini, who created the soundtrack for the original film, composed the soundtrack of the video game.

During development, Gun Media released two tracks from the upcoming soundtrack, which released as "Harry Manfredini Full Track – 01" on November 9, 2015 and "Harry Manfredini Full Track – 02" on May 14, 2016.

A trailer of the game released for PAX West 2016 featured the theme for the game, "Killer", recorded by Crazy Lixx. Other songs included in the game from Crazy Lixx include "Live Before I Die" and "XIII" which can be heard when the radio is played.

The song "Friday the 13th" by punk rock band Misfits, from their 2016 EP of the same name, can be heard on any radio in the game and also in the car when escaping. Gun Media uploaded a trailer featuring the song during the game's development.

On September 11, 2018, La-La Land Records released Friday the 13th — The Game: Official Game Soundtrack on 2-disc CD.

== Release ==
The game was pushed back from the fall release date, multiplayer came out on May 26, 2017, and the campaign was released in Q3 2017. The initial release was digital exclusive, with a physical copy published on October 13, 2017.

On June 11, 2018, Gun Media announced that it had canceled all future content updates including DLC for the game, citing a dispute between Cunningham and Victor Miller over rights, lawsuit and ownership of the original film as making it "unfeasible now or in the future". The studio still plans to offer maintenance patches. Miller won the lawsuit on September 28, 2018.

On September 25, 2018, it was announced that Black Tower Studios would take over as the new development partner for the game.

Friday the 13th: Ultimate Slasher Switch Edition for the Nintendo Switch was released on August 13, 2019.

=== Discontinuation ===
Due to licensing issues with franchise creator Victor Miller, the game's servers were shut down in November 2020, though online play remained accessible via peer-to-peer matchmaking. The game was delisted at the end of 2023 due to the license expiring. On December 31, 2024, all online services were discontinued, leaving only offline modes available for play.

On April 1, 2024, a group of modders announced Friday the 13th: The Game – Resurrected, a mod of Friday the 13th: The Game that promises to bring back the online multiplayer via private servers as well as add new content. On April 8, seven days before the planned release, the mod team was forced to stop the mod development after receiving a cease and desist letter from Horror, Inc. for alleged copyright infringement.

== Reception ==
Reception

Aggregate score
Aggregator	Score
Metacritic	(PC) 61/100 (PS4) 61/100 (XONE) 53/100 (Switch) 69/100

Review scores
Publication	Score
Destructoid	6.5/10
Game Informer	6/10
GameRevolution	4/5
GameSpot	4/10
IGN	6.9/10
PC Gamer (US)	75/100
Polygon	4/10

Awards
Publication	Award
35th Annual Golden Joystick Awards	Best Indie Game
IGN Best of 2017 Awards	Best Multiplayer (People's Choice)

Friday the 13th: The Game received "mixed or average" reviews, according to review aggregator website Metacritic.

Caitlin Cooke of Destructoid gave the game 6.5/10, concluding "There aren't many games that can offer a camaraderie aspect to the survival horror genre, and Friday the 13th delivers in that regard. It could certainly use a lot more fine tuning and adjustments, but for now, it delivers on a solidly campy experience."

James Kozanitis of GameRevolution wrote: "Is it perfect? Not by a long shot. Indeed, you'll experience graphical bugs and other quirks that break your immersion. But, after getting into Friday the 13th: The Game, and I mean really getting into it, discovering all its intricacies and more technical aspects, these problems will seem so small as to evaporate, and balance issues you once perceived will be corrected. And what's left is a truly unique experience, unlike any other multiplayer game you've played (certainly a cut above other asymmetrical titles), where cooperation, wits, and sometimes ruthless murder are what it takes to survive."

Peter Brown of GameSpot gave the game a mostly negative review, writing: "As of now, a week after launch, it's short on content and performs poorly all around, especially on consoles. The story goes that the developers weren't prepared for the amount of people who wanted to jump on day one, but that does little to assuage players who were convinced that they were paying for a finished product. Despite showing potential that may one day be realized, Friday the 13th comes across as an unfinished game that shouldn't have been released in its current state."

IGN's Daemon Hatfield concluded: "Lopsided gameplay and egregious bugs almost kill the mood of Jason's murder spree in Friday the 13th: The Game." Tyler Wilde of PC Gamer wrote that it "needs more maps, but right now Friday the 13th is a gory game of hide-and-go-seek that's fun with funny people." Austen Goslin of Polygon wrote that "Friday the 13th: The Game mimics the surface level of the classic film series, but misses the spirit."

The game has sold 1.8 million copies as of August 2017. Despite mixed reviews, the game went on to win the Best Indie Game award at the 35th Annual Golden Joystick Awards, though it was nominated for Best Multiplayer Game. The game was also nominated and became a runner-up for "Best Multiplayer" at the IGN Best of 2017 Awards, although it won the 2017 People's Choice Award. In addition, the game was nominated for "Game Design, New IP" and "Game, Original Action" at the 17th Annual National Academy of Video Game Trade Reviewers Awards. GamesRadar+ ranked the game 14th on their list of the 25 Best Games of 2017.

Despite mixed reviews, the collectible Pamela Voorhees Tapes written by Tom McLoughlin and Tommy Jarvis Tapes written by Adam Green earned a positive response from fans and critics with the latter earning the most praise with many enjoying the easter eggs and references Green put in tying Tommy Jarvis into other horror franchises. The Jarvis Tapes include references to A Nightmare on Elm Street, Halloween, Behind the Mask: The Rise of Leslie Vernon, Hatchet, and Shocker.

== See also ==
- List of horror video games
- Dead by Daylight
- Evil Dead: The Game
- Halloween: The Game
- Identity V
- Killer Klowns from Outer Space: The Game
- Predator: Hunting Grounds
- Propnight
- The Texas Chainsaw Massacre
