= The Day Before (disambiguation) =

The Day Before was a video game released in 2023.

The Day Before may also refer to:

- The Day Before (EP), by Snob Scrilla
- "The Day Before" (Jericho), an episode of the TV series
