= Inquisitor (hardware testing software) =

- Developer: Mikhail Yakshin, et al.
- OS family: Linux (Unix-like)
- Working state: Current
- Source model: Open source
- Latest release: 3.0 / July 20, 2008
- Kernel type: Monolithic kernel
- Default user interface: Text, curses-based
- License: GNU General Public License and other licenses
- Official website: www.inquisitor.ru

Inquisitor is a software suite used for hardware diagnostics, stress testing, certification and benchmarking. It is available in three formats:

- Live – Distributed as a Linux live CD distribution; system under test should be booted from it; this way one particular system can be tested thoroughly.
- Enterprise – A most advanced format; multiple systems can be tested simultaneously by booting from network using PXE, in fully controlled environment; all testing progress and results are collected on central server to be analyzed by testing operator.

Released under the terms of version 3 of the GNU General Public License, Inquisitor is free software.

== History ==
Inquisitor started in early 2004 as a closed project developed by Mikhail Yakshin at ALT Linux for MaxSelect, a Russian hardware vendor. First versions were closed-source, although some effort was made to open some of its components. Versions 1 and 2 were fully developed in-house and were fully adopted by MaxSelect and its multiple branches. These versions concentrated on server-based enterprise testing and were optimized mostly for notebook hardware.

In 2005, a special abridged version of Inquisitor suite was developed for distribution on Live CDs. These Live CDs were supplied with MaxSelect products, so every buyer can stress test their newly bought hardware to ensure it runs stably.

In August, 2007, all legal complications were solved and Inquisitor was announced as an open source platform. This platform can be used to implement various Linux-based solutions that deal with hardware testing, monitoring and benchmarking. As of July, 2008, version 3.0 is released into public.

Version 3.1 made it to beta, but the distribution was discontinued before this beta was finalized.

== Tests ==
Minimal steps that can be undertaken for purposes of testing or benchmarking are called "tests" in Inquisitor and are implemented as simple Unix shell scripts that run other (binary) programs and collects their results. In its simplest form, test outputs only binary result: success or failure, but more advanced API is supplied for benchmarks that output results.

As of 2008, Inquisitor distribution includes following tests:

- Array configurator
- Boot from image
- BYTEmark benchmark suite
- CPU benchmark: Dhrystone
- CPU benchmark: Whetstone
- CPU burn
- Database to Detects comparison
- DD
- FDD read/write
- Firmware reflashing
- HDD array stress
- HDD benchmark: Bonnie
- HDD benchmark: hdparm
- HDD benchmark: IOzone
- HDD passthrough
- HDD SMART
- Memory benchmark: STREAM
- Memory test: Memtester
- Mencoder in memory
- Mencoder on hard drive
- Network interface
- ODD read
- ODD write
- Partimage
- Reference-based detects comparison
- Stress compression
- Torrent upload
- UnixBench benchmark suite
- USB flash drive
- USB GPRS modem
- USB GPRS Modem Dialup
- USB GPRS modem signal level
- USB presence

== See also ==
- Phoronix Test Suite
- Stresslinux
