= Xonotic =

2011 video game

- Developer: Team Xonotic
- Publisher: Team Xonotic
- Designers: Team Xonotic and Community
- Engine: DarkPlaces engine
- Platforms: Linux, FreeBSD, OS X and Windows
- Release: Initial release date: 8 September 2011 – Current release version: 0.8.6; 20 June 2023; 3 years ago
- Genre: First-person shooter
- Modes: Single-player, multiplayer

Xonotic (/zoʊˈnɒtɪk, ksoʊ-/) is a free and open-source first-person shooter video game. It was developed as a fork of Nexuiz, following controversy surrounding the game's development. The game runs on a heavily modified version of the Quake engine known as the DarkPlaces engine. Its gameplay is similar to the Quake series of games, but with various unique elements.

== Gameplay ==
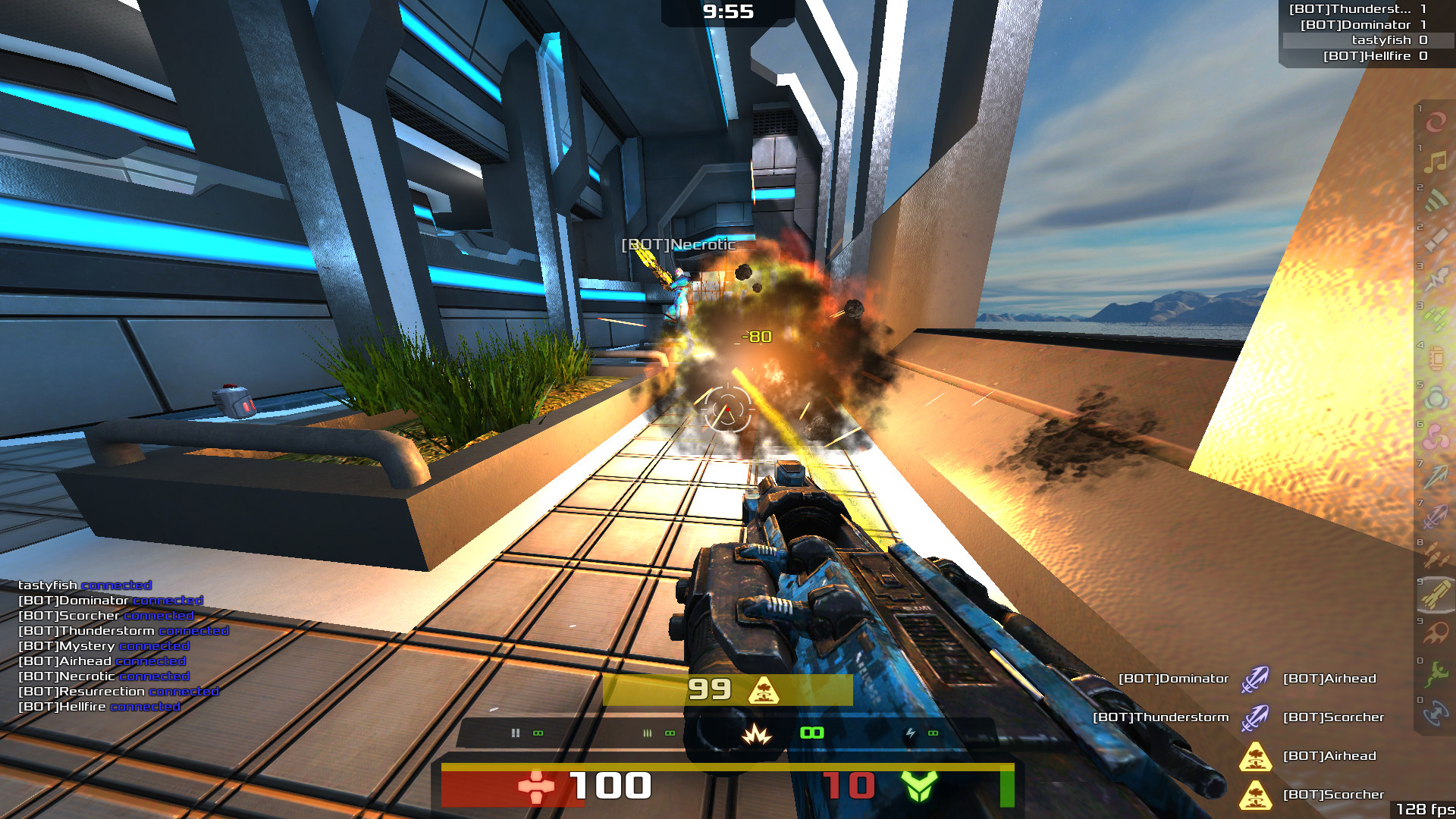
Gameplay screenshot on the map Solarium

External videos
- Deathmatch gameplay video

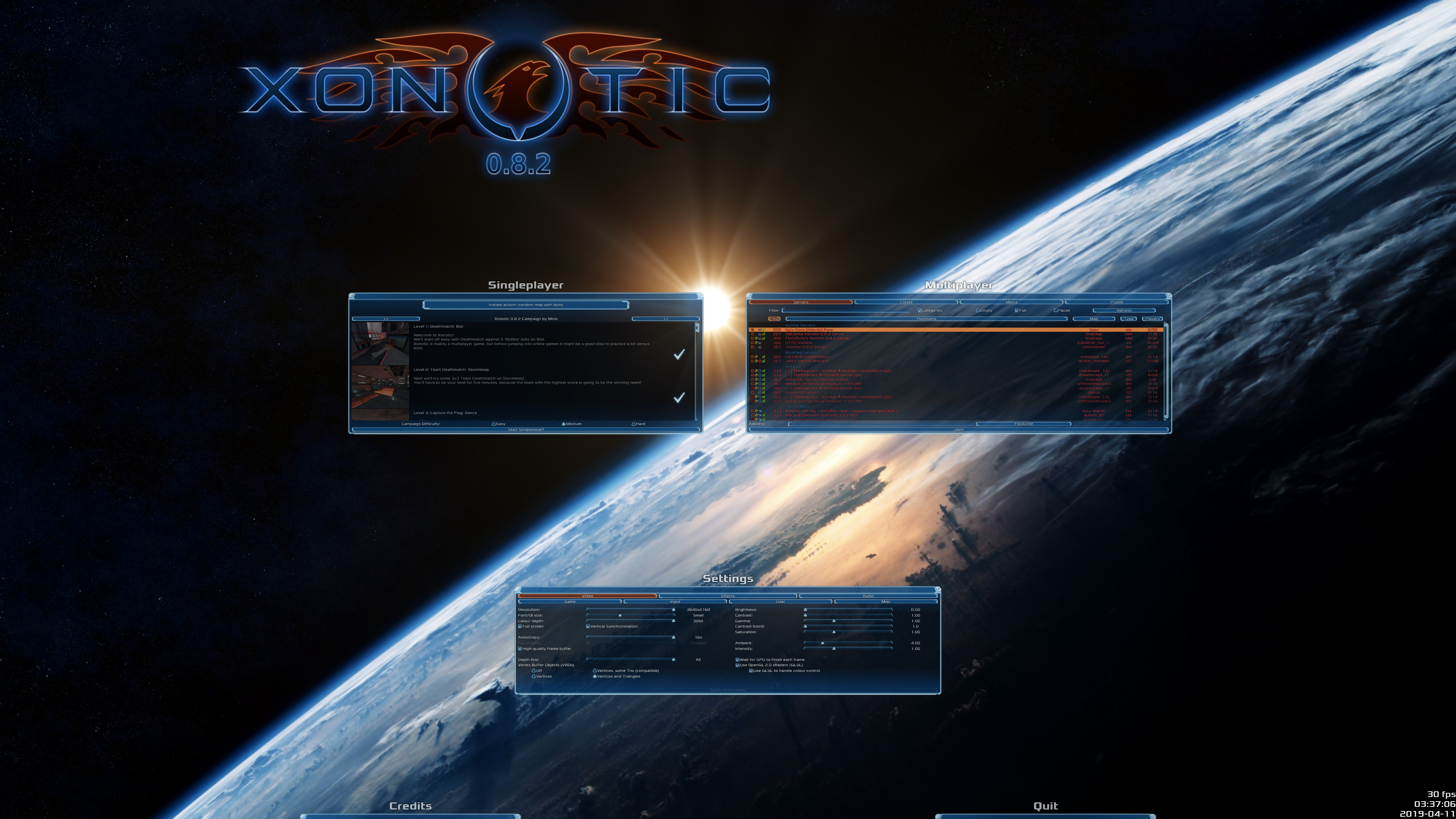
Screenshot of the Xonotic main menu – version 0.8.2

Title music "Rising of the Phoenix"

There are sixteen different game modes in Xonotic, including classic modes like deathmatch and capture the flag. In order to unlock more game modes, players must complete different levels of gameplay. To score points, players must kill enemies using futuristic weapons while completing objectives. The gameplay is very fast-paced, due to players being able to move at high speed and jump erratically. While the basic concept is inspired by other games of the same genre, there are several unique elements. Emphasis is placed on movement and player physics, with a focus on gaining speed, jumping great distances, and conquering the level geometry. This is done with classic techniques including strafe jumping, bunny hopping, and rocket jumping. Weapons have special abilities such as multiple fire modes, which increase the tactical options available to the players.

The game features a futuristic aesthetic, with maps set in high-tech environments and in space. The game runs on the DarkPlaces engine and thus supports bloom, dynamic lighting and shadowing, offset mapping, and high-dynamic-range rendering. The developers claim that the graphics quality is comparable to commercial video game titles released between 2006 and 2007.

Players can also personalize their HUD according to their exact preferences.

== Development ==
In March 2010, controversy arose over the original Nexuiz being licensed to IllFonic to create a commercial version. The original creator, Lee Vermeulen, secretly made a deal with IllFonic which gave them hold over the Nexuiz trademark. Since this turn of events was unexpected by the community and most Nexuiz developers, they promised to create a fork controlled by a community in an open manner. Approximately seven months later the source code was published via Git. A preview version was released on 23 December 2010.

Version 0.5 was released on 8 September 2011. It featured multi-language support, seven new maps, vehicle support, and enhancements to weapons and player movement, among other changes. Since the release of this version, Team Xonotic's stated aim has been to "create the best possible fast-paced open-source FPS game".

Version 0.6 was released on 8 March 2012. It added sRGB lightmap rendering, a new menu interface, 4 new maps, an integrated statistics system (XonStats), a Sandbox editing mode and the long-awaited feature of ClientSide QuakeC (CSQC) networked players. Bug fixes and optimizations were also made.

Version 0.7, was released on 8 June 2013. It featured client-side rendering of players, 4 new maps and a complete re-write of the in-game chat system. Additionally, the team migrated to the gmqcc QuakeC compiler which generated faster, more optimized program files.

The next major release of Xonotic, version 0.8, was released on 16 January 2015. It included, among other things, a new weapon, monsters, buffs and new maps.

Afterward, two minor releases came out: version 0.8.1, which was released on 26 August 2015 and 0.8.2 on 1 April 2017. They added new maps, new themes for the menu, and new gameplay features. In addition, the codebase of Xonotic was refactored.

0.8.5 was released on June 30, 2022. It added over 5 years worth of changes, including new weapon models, codebase improvements, new maps and a new mode, changes to existing modes, weapon balance changes, and bot AI improvements.

0.8.6 released on June 20, 2023. The release fixed a security bug, along with two new maps, four new modes, several balance adjustments, campaign improvements, a new bot AI type, Quake III Arena compatibility changes, bug fixes, and minor engine updates.

== Reception ==
Phoronix praised Xonotic's gameplay and graphics, and declared the game "one of the most visually-impressive open-source games available for [multiple platforms]". Larabel said, "For being a community-backed open-source game without the support of any major game studio, Xonotic is doing great." Xonotic was also deemed "the Best Free Multiplayer FPS Linux Can Muster" by Softpedia. Commenting on the game's community of both players and developers, About.com noted, "entering it makes you really feel like you've become a part of something bigger than just a video game."

In 2024, Xonotic was included on TheGamer's list of the ten best open-source video games.

== See also ==
- List of free first-person shooters
- List of free and open-source software packages
- List of open-source video games
