= The Texas Chain Saw Massacre (2023 video game) =

Survival horror video game

- Cover art featuring Leatherface, the Hitchhiker, and the Cook
- Developer: Sumo Nottingham (Note: In 2024, Black Tower Studios took the lead on support and development on the game.)
- Publisher: Gun Interactive
- Director: Wes Keltner
- Composer: Ross Tregenza
- Series: The Texas Chainsaw Massacre
- Engine: Unreal Engine 4
- Platforms: PlayStation 4; PlayStation 5; Windows; Xbox One; Xbox Series X/S
- Release: August 18, 2023
- Genre: Survival horror
- Mode: Multiplayer

The Texas Chain Saw Massacre is a 2023 asymmetrical survival horror game originally developed by Sumo Nottingham and published by Gun Interactive. It is based on the 1974 film of the same name.

The game's main mode features four victims attempting to escape a family of cannibals before they catch and kill them. The game's cast stars Kane Hodder as Leatherface (who also played the character as a stunt double in 1990's Leatherface: The Texas Chainsaw Massacre III) and Edwin Neal as the voice of the Hitchhiker (reprising the role from the original film).

The Texas Chain Saw Massacre was released for PlayStation 4, PlayStation 5, Windows, Xbox One and Xbox Series X/S on August 18, 2023, also releasing on Xbox Game Pass on the same day. The game received generally positive reviews upon release, with praise directed to its faithfulness to the 1974 film and its unique four versus three gameplay, though criticism towards its matchmaking and technical issues, as well controversy surrounding the pricing of its purchasable downloadable content. In 2025, it was announced that the game would not receive any further updates or support.

== Plot ==
The main mode of the game takes place in April 1973, five months before the events of the 1974 film. The plot revolves around Ana Flores and her college friends who go searching for her missing sister, Maria, near the fictional town of Newt, Texas. The group is ultimately captured by the Sawyer family, a group of cannibalistic maniacs.

The Rush Week mode takes place in 1978, five years after the events of the main mode and the film. The plot revolves around Johnny who enters a sorority house in Granger Hill, Texas, with the intention of killing the girls living in it. The plot of this mode is also considered canon and was validated by Kim Henkel.

== Modes ==
=== Main mode ===
==== Gameplay ====
Players begin a match by taking on the role of either a family member or a victim, with a total of three family members and four victims being playable for a total of seven players per match. A match is set on one of six maps: the Slaughter family house, a gas station, a slaughterhouse, a mill, Nancy's house, and a graveyard. The family house and gas station are locations featured in the film whereas the slaughterhouse, the mill, the graveyard, and Nancy's house are new locales. Each map, except for the graveyard, has a day and a night variation, altering the lighting and atmosphere. A feature on each map is the basement where all the victims and Leatherface begin the match.

After escaping their restraints, the victims must first escape the basement to reach various methods of escape. Victims can escape via one of the four exits which are always present in every map. Family members meanwhile must track and kill the victims; if enough damage is dealt to a victim, they are immediately killed and are removed from the match. Family members must also feed Grandpa, a stationary character who feeds on the blood of victims and blood buckets around the map. After he is awoken by enough noise being made by victims, he will occasionally shriek, revealing the outlines of any victim who is moving to all family members. A match is completed when all victims either escape or are killed.

Players gain experience from each round and can spend earned skill points into each character's specific skill tree. Perks and attributes are unlocked via the skill tree, allowing each character to be customized and fit a certain play style.

==== Characters ====
† This symbol denotes characters available through DLCs.

There are eight family members to play as, each with unique play styles and abilities.

- Leatherface is a chainsaw-wielding maniac who is unique in that he starts the game in the basement with the victims. His chainsaw allows him to destroy obstacles and deal great damage to victims.
- The Cook is an old man who is able to listen for victims who make noise, granting him the ability to see them across the map.
- The Hitchhiker has access to traps which can be placed to temporarily immobilize victims who step on them. The Hitchhiker also excels at chasing victims with his high stamina and being able to squeeze through tight spaces.
- Johnny, the fourth member of the family, excels at tracking and is able to see the footprints of victims for a short time after they walk through an area.
- Sissy, a former resident of Spahn Ranch, is able to lace objects or blow poison onto victims, providing obstacles to their path.
- Nancy †, the mother of Johnny, can see where the victims are and can place barbed wire traps in gaps and crawl spaces.
- Hands †, a 7-foot tall hammer-wielding distant cousin of the Slaughter family, has the ability to barge victims, dismantle valves and fuses, quickly restart battery and generator, and rig electrified booby traps on barricades, crawlspaces, and other metal objects.
- Bones † is the mortician of Muerto County's cemetery. He uses this to his advantage in order to cover up the crimes of the Family.

There are nine victims who each possess their own abilities and are new characters created for the game.

- Ana Flores takes less damage from attacks. She is leader of the group and is the one who decided to go looking for Maria after her disappearance.
- Connie Taylor can unlock doors near-instantly at a reduction in stamina.
- Julie Crawford can temporarily run for longer and be undetectable to family members' tracking abilities.
- Leland McKinney can knock down family members, temporarily stunning them.
- Sonny Williams is able to detect nearby movement made by family members and victims.
- Danny Gaines † is Maria's boyfriend and is able to tamper with exits, making them un-closable by family members. He was found by the family before the group because he was searching for Maria directly after her disappearance, as he refused to wait for the others.
- Virginia † is a victim with the ability to create medicinal powders and blinding powders to aid the victim's escape. Before the event of the game, she was looking for her missing son Jesse. Her search led her to the family's house where she discovered Maria. When they tried to escape, they were kidnapped by the family.
- Maria Flores † is Ana's sister and has a sweet-talk ability that can cause Grandpa's sonar ability to highlight family members. She was kidnapped by the family before the events of the game.
- Wyatt Dunn † is a bull rider from Austin. He was kidnapped by Bones during a visit to his brother's grave in an old cemetery.

=== Rush Week mode ===
==== Gameplay ====
In September 2024, a second mode, titled Rush Week, was released. In this mode, a character is randomly assigned to each player. One takes the role of Johnny, while six other players take the role of Sorority Girls for a total of seven players per match.

In this mode, the Sorority Girls need to find key items around the map to help them escape. A pair of car keys can be found to unlock a car where they can radio to the police to get help. They can also complete a fuse objective to use a phone in the house to call the police. If the police have been called successfully, players will have a limited amount of time to survive in the Sorority House with Johnny. An Attic Pole can be used to make an escape via an attic hatch, but only two Sorority Girls can escape through this exit. Johnny players can break the ladder to prevent this escape.

The Sorority Girls players can find various weapons and distractions like a wrench, a knife, and pepper spray, as well as perfume that can be thrown at Johnny to reveal his location. The Sorority Girls players are under a fear system where if one of them has a high level of fear, Johnny can smell that fear and find them easier. The Sorority Girls players need to complete objectives in order to lower their amount of fear.

Johnny’s objective is to hunt and kill the Sorority Girls. With each execution, he gets stronger, making him more lethal the longer a match goes.

== Development ==
Gun Interactive previously created the 2017 asymmetrical horror game Friday the 13th: The Game. Following the loss of the video game rights, Gun Interactive began developing The Texas Chain Saw Massacre after gaining the rights from original film co-writer Kim Henkel. Henkel only holds the interactive rights to the 1974 film of the same name and thus Gun Interactive cannot legally include elements from other films in the series.

The developers utilized motion capture to portray each characters' animations in the game.

Remains: The Companion Album to The Texas Chain Saw Massacre Game is a soundtrack developed in addition alongside the game's official game soundtrack, and was composed by Jim Bonney and Wes Keltner.

Before the game's full release, a technical test ran from May 25–29, 2023 where players could play an early access version of the game.

In February 2024, it was announced that Black Tower Studios were new developers for the game.

On May 13, 2025, Gun Interactive announced that the game will not receive any further updates or support.

=== Casting ===
The story of the game is given in an intro narration scene, reminiscent of the original film and is voiced by Aaron LaPlante.

Leatherface is portrayed by Kane Hodder with Lex Lang providing the voice after being played by Gunnar Hansen in the original film, having died in 2015. Troy Burgess takes over the role of the Cook from Jim Siedow (who died in 2003) who portrayed him in the first and second films. Edwin Neal reprises his role as the Hitchhiker from the original film, with Sean Whalen performing the motion capture for the character. Johnny is portrayed by Dove Meir and voice provided by Damian Maffei. Sissy is portrayed by Kristina Klebe. Johnny and Sissy are new to the Texas Chainsaw Massacre franchise and were created with input by original film screenwriter Kim Henkel. The voice and motion capture for Hands is provided by Robert Mukes.

Female victims motion capture was performed by Scout Taylor-Compton, in addition to her voicing Julie Crawford. And the male victims mo-cap was performed by Hunter C. Smith. Ana was voiced by Jeannie Tirado, Connie by Bryarly Bishop, Leland by Matt Lowe, Sonny by Zeno Robinson, Virginia by Barbara Crampton, and Danny by Michael Johnston.

In December 2024, it was announced that Skeet Ulrich and Bill Moseley had joined the cast of the game, with Ulrich voicing Wyatt Dunn and Moseley voicing and performing the motion capture for Bones.

=== Marketing ===
The game was announced during The Game Awards 2021 and was accompanied by a short teaser trailer.

In May 2023, a YouTube channel was launched with the name, "LoFi Leatherface". The channel used animation and artwork created by Matt Hubel alongside audio of lo-fi music.

== Release ==
The game was released on August 18, 2023 on PlayStation 4, PlayStation 5, Windows, Xbox One and Xbox Series X/S. The game was also available on Xbox Game Pass at launch, which Gun Interactive CEO Wes Keltner described as "paramount" to bring in strong player numbers and keep match lobbies full.

The game reached 1 million players in the first 24 hours of its release.

== Reception ==
Reception

Aggregate score
Aggregator	Score
Metacritic	(PC) 72/100 (PS5) 71/100 (XSXS) 77/100

Review scores
Publication	Score
Eurogamer	3/5 stars
GameSpot	9/10
GamesRadar+	3/5 stars
IGN	6/10
PCGamesN	8/10
Push Square	5/10 stars
Shacknews	8/10
The Guardian	4/5 stars

The Texas Chain Saw Massacre received "generally favorable" reviews, according to review aggregator Metacritic for the Xbox Series X version, but the Windows and PlayStation 5 versions received "mixed or average" reviews.

In his review of the pre-release version of the game, PC Gamer's Luke Winkle praised the game's horror elements and 1970s setting, stating it "mirrors the claustrophobia and creeping dread of the 1974 horror classic."

Mark Delaney of GameSpot gave the game a 9/10, stating "the adaptation of one of the scariest movies ever made becomes one of the scariest games I've ever played". He praised the game's maps, music, and overall atmosphere, stating the game was "driven by chaos and dread just like its source material", but criticized the unlockable character cosmetics as "lacking", and the "4v3 setup limits some groups in matchmaking".

Writing for GamesRadar+, Jordan Gerblick praised the visual design and atmosphere but criticized the tutorials, lack of objective markers, and technical issues. He wrote, "Leatherface brings with him an iconic presence that puts Dead by Daylight's take on the chainsaw-wielding psychopath to shame, as well as truly ingenious refinements to the genre, but he's accompanied by a matchmaking system that frequently makes you wait five minutes or more for a game, a host of bugs and server issues [...], and an utterly sorry excuse for a tutorial."

Travis Northup of IGN gave the game a 6/10, criticizing the pressing technical issues and lack of ways to help newcomers learning how to play the game. He stated that "The Texas Chainsaw Massacre's less asymmetrical take on the asymmetrical horror genre offers a few entertaining, technically challenged hours of fun."

Writing for Slant Magazine, Ryan Aston praised the victim's tense gameplay and its faithfulness to the original film. He also found the three versus four dynamic of the game to be a "compelling direction for the genre" and makes it feel "closer to a survival horror game than your average asymmetrical title."

William Cennamo of Screen Rant gave the game a 3/5 rating and declared the game to be a "must-play" for fans of asymmetrical horror games but noted "a fair number of issues" relating to replayability and a general lack of depth. These included an unsatisfying and limiting progression system combined with repetitive gameplay due to the similarity of maps and escape methods.

Kotaku's Ashley Bardhan found that the gameplay and horror elements were ultimately "underwhelming." Bardhan found the game's story to be "an admirable living shrine" to the 1974 film, but does not fully "embrac[e] its own unsettling narrative" with horror elements being undercut by short match times and repetitive gameplay.

== See also ==
- List of horror video games
- Dead by Daylight
- Evil Dead: The Game
- Friday the 13th: The Game
- Halloween: The Game
- Identity V
- Killer Klowns from Outer Space: The Game
- Predator: Hunting Grounds
- Propnight
