= IOzone =

- Original author(s): William Norcott
- Developer(s): Don Capps, et al
- Stable release: 3.507 / February 7, 2025; 38 days ago
- Written in: C
- Available in: English
- Type: Benchmark
- Website: www.iozone.org

IOzone is a file system benchmark utility. Originally made by William Norcott, further enhanced by Don Capps and others.

Source code is available from iozone.org. It does mmap() file I/O and uses POSIX Threads.

It won the 2007 Infoworld Bossie Awards for Best file I/O tool.

The Windows version of IOzone uses Cygwin. Builds are available for AIX, BSDI, HP-UX, IRIX, FreeBSD, Linux, OpenBSD, NetBSD, OSFV3, OSFV4, OSFV5, SCO OpenServer, Solaris, Mac OS X, Windows (95/98/Me/NT/2K/XP).

It is available as a test profile in the Phoronix Test Suite.
