= Breach & Clear =

2013 game

- Logo of Breach & Clear
- Developer: Mighty Rabbit Studios
- Publishers: Gun Media; Gambitious Digital Entertainment (PC, from 2015); Devolver Digital (PC, from 2015)
- Director: Joshua Fairhurst
- Producer: Robert Bowling
- Designers: Joshua Fairhurst; Chris D. Cooper; Randy Greenback
- Programmer: Cassandra Schmettau
- Artists: David Brossoie; Robert Zamber
- Composer: Sean Murray
- Engine: Unity
- Platforms: Android; iOS; Microsoft Windows; OS X; PlayStation Vita; Linux
- Release: iOS: WW: July 17, 2013; Android: WW: September 5, 2013; Windows, OS X, Linux: WW: March 21, 2014; PlayStation Vita: WW: May 12, 2015; NA: October 29, 2015 (retail)
- Genres: Turn-based strategy, action role-playing
- Mode: Single-player

Breach & Clear is a turn-based strategy action role-playing game developed by Mighty Rabbit Studios and published by Gun Media. The player is in control of four special forces units who must enter an area and kill all enemies in it. The player plans the actions of all characters in advance and the turns are resolved simultaneously. It was released for iOS on July 17, 2013 and for Android on September 5, 2013. The game was ported to Microsoft Windows, OS X and Linux, and was released through Steam on March 21, 2014. A PlayStation Vita version was released the following year. On November 15, the iOS version of the game joined the gaming subscription service GameClub. The physical version for Vita is notable as being the rarest released Vita game in North America, with a print run of 1,500 as a mail-in order title.

== Development and release ==
On May 3, 2014, the Frozen Synapse DLC Pack was released for PC, featuring levels inspired by and designed like Frozen Synapse. Unlike the main game, which takes place in real-world places, the DLC missions take place in a manifestation of the cyberspace. Following a publishing deal for the game's sequel, Breach & Clear: Deadline, the game was acquired by Gambitious Digital Entertainment and Devolver Digital in early 2015. The sequel was released on July 21, 2015. Deadline leaves the notion of real-world simulation behind by adding zombies to the game.

The PlayStation Vita version of Breach & Clear was released digitally on May 21, 2015, and was later re-published and distributed physically by Mighty Rabbit Studios' subsidiary Limited Run Games. The game became notable for being the rarest physically released PlayStation Vita game, with 1,500 copies printed, and for being released as a mail-in order title. The physical copies were put up for purchase on Limited Run Games' website on October 29, 2015, and were sold out in two hours.

== Reception ==
Reception

Aggregate score
Aggregator	Score
Metacritic	66/100 (iOS); 55/100 (Vita)

Review scores
Publication	Score
Eurogamer	6/10
Game Informer	6.5/10
GamesMaster	82%
Gamezebo	2.5/5
MacLife	3.5/5
Pocket Gamer	3.5/5
TouchArcade	3/5
VentureBeat	63/100
VideoGamer.com	4/10
Digital Spy	3/5

The iOS and Vita versions received "mixed or average reviews" according to the review aggregation website Metacritic.
