= Stresslinux =

Linux distribution for stress testing

Stresslinux is a light-weight Linux distribution designed to test a computer's hardware by running the components at high load while monitoring their health. It is designed to be booted from CD-ROM or via PXE. Its name comes from the term stress test, which is what this distribution does.

== See also ==
- Inquisitor (hardware testing software) — Linux distribution for hardware stress testing
- Phoronix Test Suite — Linux distribution for benchmarking purposes
