= Crazy Lixx =

Swedish rock band

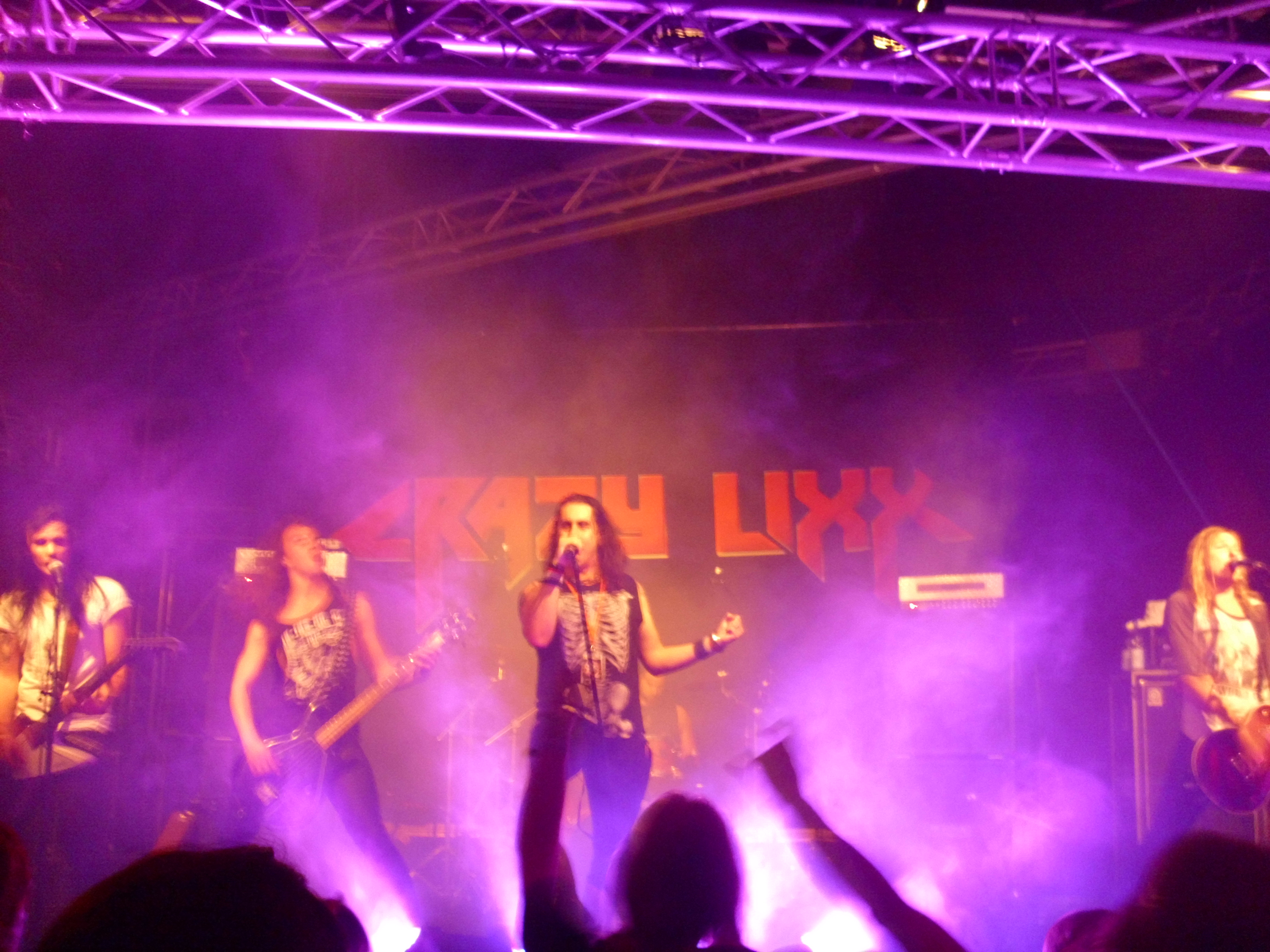
- Crazy Lixx at "Stryderstock-Festival" (2013)

Background information
- Origin: Malmö, Sweden
- Genres: Sleaze rock, hard rock, glam metal, arena rock
- Years active: 2002–present
- Labels: Frontiers, Swedmetal
- Members: Danny Rexon; Jens Anderson; Chrisse Olsson; Jens Lundgren; Robin Nilsson
- Past members: Vic Zino; Loke Rivano; Andy Zäta; Edd Liam; Joél Cirera
- Website: crazylixx.com

Crazy Lixx is a Swedish rock band formed in Malmö in 2002. The group belongs to the Swedish hard rock scene, with influences from bands like Guns N' Roses, Aerosmith, Kiss, Whitesnake, Alice Cooper, Def Leppard and Mötley Crüe.

== History ==
=== Foundation and Loud Minority (2002–2009) ===
Crazy Lixx was founded in late 2002 by Danny Rexon and Vic Zino, in an attempt to bring back 1980s-style glam metal. After Joél Cirera was asked to be the drummer, the core of the band was formed.

They began playing in local clubs and in 2007 released their debut album Loud Minority with the local label, Swedmetal Records. The album, while not a huge commercial success, was well received within the music community, being ranked at #3 in Sleaze Rock's Reader's Top Twenty Albums of 2007.

After only a few shows with the band, Vic Zino left the band in 2009 due to artistic differences. Shortly after, he was invited to replace guitarist Thomas Silver in the band Hardcore Superstar, where he remains to this day.

=== New Religion, Riot Avenue and Crazy Lixx S/T (2009–2014) ===
With the line-up reformed, in 2009 Crazy Lixx signed a contract with the Italian label Frontiers Records. In 2010, the band released its second studio album, New Religion.

In April 2012, Crazy Lixx released their third studio album entitled Riot Avenue. This album is rawer than their previous efforts and is sometimes considered somewhat of a dark horse album. Nonetheless, it includes songs considered to be some of their best, from the track opener Whiskey Tango Foxtrot to the album closer, the power ballad Only The Dead Know.

In September 2014, Crazy Lixx announced their fourth studio album would be self-titled and released in Europe on 7 November and in the United States on 11 November on Frontiers Records.

=== New lineup, Ruff Justice, Forever Wild, and Street Lethal (2015–present) ===
In August 2015, it was announced through the official website of Crazy Lixx that guitarist Edd Liam and songwriting guitarist Andy Zäta had left the band. The news article said that Edd had personal reasons to do so, while Andy was instead involved with the British band Inglorious. Lead singer Danny Rexon added that "the band's future existence [was] at stake".

Later that month, Crazy Lixx began to look for new guitarists and potential lyricists, allowing anyone to apply for these positions.

In February 2016, the band released a music video for the song "All Looks, No Hooks", featuring new guitarists Chrisse Olsson and Jens Lundgren. The band's first live album was released on 8 May 2016, and consisted of songs recorded in July 2015, which was the last show with guitarist Andreas Zäta Eriksson.

In 2016 it was disclosed that Crazy Lixx would appear at the three-day Rockingham 2016 melodic/hard rock festival, held in Nottingham, United Kingdom. They appeared on Saturday 22 October, fourth in a seven-act line-up headlined by Steelheart.

On 9 February 2017, Crazy Lixx announced an upcoming album titled Ruff Justice, to be released on 21 April of that year. The album contains three songs that also appear in Friday the 13th: The Game. The first album single "XIII", which serves as the theme song for the game, was released on 2 March.

Crazy Lixx's sixth studio album Forever Wild (2019) comprises 10 tracks. Their seventh studio album, Street Lethal, was released in November 2021 with mainly positive reviews and includes 11 tracks. Their latest album, "Two Shots at Glory," was released in February 2024 and includes three new tracks and nine remixes of songs they released on previous albums.

On 21 March 2024, drummer Joél Cirera announced he would be departing the band following their performance in Copenhagen on 11 May.

== Band members ==
=== Current members ===
- Danny Rexon – vocals, guitar (2002–present)
- Jens Anderson – bass (2012–present)
- Chrisse Olsson – guitar (2016–present)
- Jens Lundgren – guitar (2016–present)
- Robin Nilsson – drums (2024–present)

=== Past members ===
- Vic Zino – guitar (2002–2008)
- Loke Rivano – bass (2005–2011)
- Christian Edvardsson (Edd Liam) – guitar (2010–2015)
- Andreas Eriksson (Andy Zata) – guitar (2008–2015)
- Joél Cirera – drums (2002–2024)

== Discography ==
=== Studio albums ===
Title	Album details
Loud Minority	Released: 21 November 2007; Label: Swedmetal Records
New Religion	Released: 19 March 2010; Label: Frontiers Records
Riot Avenue	Released: 20 April 2012; Label: Frontiers Records
Crazy Lixx	Released: 7 November 2014; Label: Frontiers Records
Ruff Justice	Released: 21 April 2017; Label: Frontiers Records
Forever Wild	Released: 17 May 2019; Label: Frontiers Records
Street Lethal	Released: 5 November 2021; Label: Frontiers Records
Two Shots at Glory	Released: 15 February 2024; Label: Frontiers Records
Thrill of the Bite	Released: 14 February 2025; Label: Frontiers Records

=== Live albums ===
Title	Album details
Sound of the LIVE Minority	Released: 8 July 2016; Label: Frontiers Records

=== Singles ===
Release year	Title
2005	"Do or Die"
2007	"Heroes Are Forever"
2008	"Make Ends Meet"
2008	"Want It"
2012	"In the Night"
2014	"Sympathy"
2015	"Heroes"
2023	"Whisky Tango Foxtrot"
2023	"Lights Out!"
2023	"Fire It Up"
2024	"Ain't No Rest in Rock N' Roll"
2024	"Call of the Wild"
