= Radiant One =

2018 video game

- Developer: Fntastic
- Publisher: Fntastic
- Platforms: Microsoft Windows, macOS, Xbox One, Linux, iOS, Apple TV
- Release: 2018
- Genre: Adventure
- Mode: Single-player

Radiant One is an adventure video game developed by Fntastic. Radiant One was announced on July 6, 2018.

== Plot ==
Trying to escape from his boring life and social media, one day Daniel found a mysterious book about lucid dreams. Very quickly he was able to do incredible things, create amazing worlds and fly during sleep until one day his dreams fell under the power of something inexplicable, something terrible conceived by the Universe itself... Help Daniel survive, pass the test and get enlightenment.

== Reception ==
Reception

Aggregate score
Aggregator	Score
Metacritic	iOS: 82/100

Review score
Publication	Score
TouchArcade	iOS: 4.5/5 (The Secret) 3/5

The iOS version of Radiant One received generally favorable reviews from critics, according to the review aggregation website Metacritic. Radiant One has been met with praise for its rendering of the environment and the narrative of the game.

== See also ==
- Dead Dozen, Fntastic's second game
- Propnight, Fntastic's fourth game
