= Nexuiz (2012 video game) =

2012 video game

- Developer(s): IllFonic
- Publisher(s): THQ
- Engine: CryEngine 3
- Platform(s): Windows, Xbox 360 (XBLA)
- Release: Xbox 360: WW: February 29, 2012; Microsoft Windows: NA: May 3, 2012; EU: May 10, 2012
- Genre(s): First-person shooter
- Mode(s): Multiplayer

Nexuiz is a 2012 first-person shooter video game developed by IllFonic and published by THQ for Microsoft Windows and Xbox 360. It used CryEngine 3 and it is based on the original free game Nexuiz (due to the name having been sold to Nexuiz, the free game continued its development under the Xonotic name). The servers for the Xbox 360 and PC versions were taken offline in February 2013 due to the closure of THQ.

== Overview ==
Nexuiz is a remake of 2005's Nexuiz, which began development as a 2001 Quake mod developed by Lee Vermeulen. The project then moved to the DarkPlaces engine. On March 1, 2010, it was revealed that IllFonic had purchased the rights to the name Nexuiz.

During matches, players can acquire and activate mutators that provide them with unique gameplay abilities.

== Reception ==
Reception

Aggregate score
Aggregator	Score
Metacritic	54/100

Review scores
Publication	Score
Game Informer	6/10
GameSpot	8.0
IGN	8.0
Official Xbox Magazine (UK)	4/10

Nexuiz received mixed reviews. GameSpot praised its price and fast pace, but Game Informer wrote that as a "haphazard port" of an old mod for an old game, it added little to the genre or original concept except for charging players.

== See also ==
- Nexuiz, a free first-person shooter video game whose name was sold by Alientrap to Illfonic.
- Xonotic, a continuation of the free first-person shooter video game under a new name after the name was sold to Illfonic.
