= Gun Interactive =

American video game publisher

- Formerly: Gun Media (2010–2021)
- Type: Private
- Industry: Video games
- Founded: 2010; 16 years ago
- Founders: Ronnie Hobbs; Wes Keltner
- Headquarters: Lexington, Kentucky, US
- Key people: Wes Keltner (president, CEO); Chris Winfield (COO); Ronnie Hobbs (creative director)
- Number of employees: 15 (2025)
- Website: guninteractive.com

Gun Interactive (formerly Gun Media; stylized as Gun.) is an American video game publisher based in Lexington, Kentucky. It was founded by Ronnie Hobbs and Wes Keltner in 2010.

== History ==
Gun Interactive was founded by Ronnie Hobbs and Wes Keltner in 2010.

The company started operations in 2012. On July 17, 2013, the company's first title, Breach & Clear was released, along with its sequel Deadline on July 21, 2015.

On November 24, 2014, Gun Media released their first console game, Speakeasy, on the PlayStation 4. The game received a 3/10 from GameSpot and is no longer available on the PlayStation Network.

In 2015, Randy Greenback, the company's Executive Producer and Director, created two campaigns for Friday the 13th: The Game, Kickstarter and BackerKit. From the two campaigns, the game raised an approximate total of US$1.1 million, becoming the 106th most crowdfunded project of all time. Earlier, Friday the 13th director Sean S. Cunningham approached the team and offered the team the video game license, to which they accepted. The game was originally developed by Denver-based studio IllFonic under the name Slasher Vol. 1: Summer Camp, but was revealed as the new game with release delayed from October 2015 to 2016.

In January 2016, both IllFonic and Gun Media spoke at a developer panel at PAX South and premiered in-engine alpha footage and a list of kill animations there, and premiered a gameplay demo at E3 2016 in June, scheduling the game for release in October 2016. In September 2021, Gun Media rebranded as Gun Interactive.

== Games ==
Year	Title	Developer(s)	Platform(s)
2013	Breach & Clear	Mighty Rabbit Studios	Android, iOS, macOS, Microsoft Windows, Linux, PlayStation Vita
2014	Speakeasy	Super Soul	PlayStation 4
2015	Breach & Clear: Deadline	Mighty Rabbit Studios, Gun Media	macOS, Microsoft Windows, Linux, PlayStation 4, Xbox One
2017	Friday the 13th: The Game	IllFonic	Microsoft Windows, Nintendo Switch, PlayStation 4, Xbox One
2019	Layers of Fear 2	Bloober Team	Microsoft Windows, Nintendo Switch, PlayStation 4, Xbox One
2023	The Texas Chain Saw Massacre	Sumo Nottingham	Microsoft Windows, PlayStation 4, PlayStation 5, Xbox One, Xbox Series X/S
2026	Halloween: The Game	IllFonic	Microsoft Windows, PlayStation 5, Xbox Series X/S
