= Dead Dozen =

2018 video game

- Developer: Fntastic
- Publisher: Fntastic
- Platform: Microsoft Windows
- Release: March 7, 2018
- Genres: First-person shooter, survival horror
- Mode: Multiplayer

Dead Dozen is a first-person shooter with survival horror elements. The game was announced on November 8, 2017 and released by Fntastic for Windows via Steam on March 7, 2018.

== Gameplay ==
The game takes place in 1993 on an abandoned Soviet research base in Siberia, where 12 people (Survivors) were isolated from the rest of the world. Each round, one of them randomly becomes the leader of the ghouls. All whom he killed or infected, reborn in his team after their death. Each of the two teams—Survivors and Ghouls—is different in gameplay, abilities, tactical capabilities, game goals and visual accompaniment. Survivors can collect weapons, useful items, various gadgets, and barricade with special barricade sets. Ghouls can infect humans, break down walls and use their special abilities to surpass humans in battle.

== See also ==
- Radiant One, Fntastic's third game
