= Evil Dead: The Game =

2022 video game

- Developer: Saber Madrid
- Publisher: Boss Team Games
- Directors: Jesús Iglesias; Jules Faivre; Marcos Falcón Pérez
- Designers: Jesús Iglesias; Santiago Cobo Roldán
- Programmers: Marcos Falcón Pérez; José Daniel Sánchez López; Mariano Cicchinelli Cortina
- Artists: Jules Faivre; Oscar Martín Quintanilla; Germán Zamorano Córdoba; Ángel Arenas Civantos; Fernando Román; Patricia Ponce
- Writer: Craig Sherman
- Composers: Joseph LoDuca; Steve Molitz
- Series: Evil Dead
- Engine: Unreal Engine 4
- Platforms: PlayStation 4; PlayStation 5; Windows; Xbox One; Xbox Series X/S
- Release: May 13, 2022
- Genre: Survival horror
- Mode: Multiplayer

Evil Dead: The Game is a 2022 asymmetric survival horror game developed by Saber Madrid and published by Boss Team Games. It is part of the Evil Dead franchise. It features Bruce Campbell as Ash Williams, along with most of the original cast reprising their roles.

Evil Dead: The Game was released for PlayStation 4, PlayStation 5, Windows, Xbox One, and Xbox Series X/S on May 13, 2022. A version for the Nintendo Switch was planned, but cancelled in September 2023 along with live content support for the game. It received mixed reviews from critics and sold 500,000 units.

== Gameplay ==
Evil Dead: The Game is an asymmetrical multiplayer game. The game features both co-operative gameplay and player versus player (PvP) combat, although the single-player mode requires an internet connection to be played.

Asymmetrical Mode

4 Survivor players are guided by professor Raymound Knowby and must collect various objects throughout the course of the match in order to win. They must first locate the pages of a map initially in a less chaotic section to allow them to accrue rescources, cars to traverse, and Pink F upgrades. After that, survivors must accrue the lost pages of the Necronomicon and the Kandarian Dagger (in either order or simultaneously) in intense combat areas. After that, they must use the dagger against the Dark Ones in order to start the ritual. They finally protect the Necronomicon for 2 minutes in order to seal the Kandarian Demon and win the match. If a survivor HP depletes, they will become downed and need to be brought back by teammates. If their downed timer expires, they will die, but can still be resurrected by teammates at altars or upon certain objective completion. Though a survivor will remain dead for the remainder of the match at the Necronomicon ritual phase if downed at all.

All the while, the Kandarian Demon (controlled by one player) tries to inhibit the survivors and empower themselves in Dungeon Master-esque gameplay, guided by the deadite Linda. The demon must accrue Infernal Energy in order perform various actions, which is sparse throughout the map but plentiful in combat areas. Through attacking, downing, and pressuring survivors, the Demon will level up gradually throughout the match to unlock more abilities and empower existing ones. With enough Infernal Energy, they have the ability to summon mobs, trap areas and treasure chests, jumpscare survivors (to refill Infernal Energy), take control of their boss character, or possess various things. Possessing mobs will allow the Demon to control them directly with enhanced stats to attack survivors directly. Possessing cars or objects allows the Demon to take control of them and increase the fear of survivors. If the Survivor's fear is high enough, the Demon can possess that survivor giving them full control over their position and being able to attack their teammates to pit them against each other. The Demon wins if all survivors are downed and/or dead at the same time, if they deplete the Neconomicon's health at the finale of the match, or if the initial thirty-minute timer expires (that goes away once at the Dark Ones phase).

The game features four playable survivor classes of Leaders, Warriors, Hunters and Supports, and five playable demons. Leaders have a aura around them that increases the stats for themselves and teammates inside the aura radius, boosting balanced stats and high fear resistance. Warriors are up close mighty glaciers, having high health, shields, and melee damage and speed, but with poor ranged, stamina, and fear resistance. Hunters are offensive glass canons, with the highest ranged damage output and stamina, but with weak health and melee attacks. Supports specialize in keeping their team alive, as they share their Shemp's Cola and Amulets with their nearby teammates and carrying more of them, at the cost of mediocre offensive stats. The Kandarian Demon can be on 5 classes, the Warlord (Henrietta and deadites from Evil Dead II), the Puppeteer (Eligos and Eligos-esque minons from Ash Vs. Evil Dead), the Necromancer (Evil Ash and skeleton army from Army of Darkness), the Plaguebringer (The Witch and pit monsters from Army of Darkness) and The Schemer (Baal and flesh monsters from Ash Vs. Evil Dead).

The game features a level-up system, as well as skill tree mechanics. It features multiple maps, including the cabin in the woods from the Evil Dead film series, along with over 25 weapons, including Ash's chainsaw and boomstick.

== Post-launch content ==
After the release of Evil Dead: The Game, various updates were included either for free or as part of a season pass. On July 13, 2022, the Castle Kandar map, based upon Army of Darkness, was added, alongside new outfits for Arthur and Henry. On September 8, 2022, David Allen and Mia Allen, characters from the 2013 film, Evil Dead, were added to the game. As well as the new characters, a new class, known as Plaguebringer, based upon Army of Darkness, was added on the same day.

On February 2, 2023, an Ash vs Evil Dead update and the Immortal Power Bundle, a premium downloadable content pack, were released. With those content additions, Splatter Royale, a game mode that features players battling up to 40 Deadites until only one player remains, was added. The premium bundle includes outfits for Ash Williams, Pablo Simon Bolivar, Kelly Maxwell and the Puppeteer. The premium bundle added Ruby Knowby. As part of the free update, a new outfit for Pablo Simon Bolivar was added alongside the grenade launcher and the scythe, two new weapons.

On March 30, 2023, it was revealed that Evil Dead: The Game would be released on Steam on April 26, 2023 with a Game of the Year Edition that would be released on consoles, including all post-launch DLC up until that date. It was announced that "Who’s Your Daddy", a downloadable content pack, would be released and would include Brock Williams and Baal as playable characters alongside new outfits for Ash, Pablo and Amanda Fisher.

On September 19, 2023, it was announced that live content support for Evil Dead: The Game would cease immediately, although there were no plans to shut down servers in the "foreseeable future". Saber Interactive did not elaborate on the decision, but the large-scale restructuring program of parent company Embracer Group was named as a possible reason.

On March 19, 2024, it was announced that Evil Dead: The Game had enabled double experience and Soul Points permanently.

== Marketing ==
Evil Dead: The Game was announced at The Game Awards on December 10, 2020. Reveal trailers were uploaded to YouTube that same day.

American rapper Method Man released a song, "Come Get Some", in a collaboration with the game; the song is produced by Statik Selektah, and features verses from Method Man's son PXWER and U-God's son inTeLL. It contains samples of the original The Evil Dead score by Joseph LoDuca and lines spoken by Ash Williams. The song is featured in the game's launch trailer, which was released on May 14, 2022.

Special effects artist Tom Savini designed an exclusive Ash skin that was given to players who preorder the Collector's Edition of the game.

== Reception ==
Reception

Aggregate scores
Aggregator	Score
Metacritic	PC: 76/100; PS5: 72/100; XSXS: 72/100
OpenCritic	53% recommend

Review scores
Publication	Score
Famitsu	30/40
GameSpot	6/10
GamesRadar+	4/5
Hardcore Gamer	4/5
IGN	8/10
PC Gamer (US)	85/100
Push Square	8/10
Shacknews	9/10
VG247	4/5

=== Critical reception ===
Evil Dead: The Game received "mixed or average" reviews from critics for the PS5 and Xbox Series X/S versions, while the PC version received "generally favorable" reviews, according to review aggregator website Metacritic. Fellow review aggregator OpenCritic assessed that the game received fair approval, being recommended by 53% of critics.

Mark Delaney of GameSpot gave the game a score of 6 out of 10, praising its faithfulness to the Evil Dead franchise and class-based character design while criticizing the progression as slow, story missions as undeveloped, and PvP combat as unbalanced. Jordan Gerblick of GamesRadar+ commended the game's approachability, graphics, and homages made to the franchise while taking issue with the lack of content, difficulty in single-player missions, and the lack of more traversal options. Travis Northup of IGN gave the game 8 out of 10, writing, "Evil Dead: The Game is an awesome asymmetric multiplayer game that, like its source material, is far better than it has any right to be given its frustrating lack of polish and being somewhat light on maps and modes." Hardcore Gamer appreciated the game's visuals, atmosphere, fluid combat, strategy, online play, and fan service material while taking minor issues with the redundant audio and lack of content. VG247 rated the game 4 stars out of 5 and stated, "Evil Dead: The Game is a good time... however, horror fans without an affinity towards the series will likely find more fun in alternative multiplayer horror games, and they'll probably find more accessibility-friendly games, too."

=== Sales ===
Evil Dead: The Game sold 500,000 units in five days since release.

== See also ==
- List of horror video games
- Dead by Daylight, an asymmetric multiplayer game that features Ash Williams as a playable character
- Friday the 13th: The Game, an asymmetric multiplayer game based on the Friday the 13th franchise.
- Halloween: The Game
- Identity V, an asymmetric multiplayer survival horror game
- Killer Klowns from Outer Space: The Game
- Predator: Hunting Grounds
- Propnight
- The Texas Chainsaw Massacre, an asymmetric multiplayer game based on The Texas Chainsaw Massacre franchise.
