= Propnight =

2021 survival horror game

- Developer: Fntastic
- Publisher: Mytona
- Platform: Microsoft Windows
- Release: WW: December 1, 2021
- Genre: Survival horror
- Mode: Multiplayer

Propnight was an online asymmetric multiplayer survival horror game with Prop Hunt-style mechanics developed by Fntastic and published by Mytona. In the game, four players have the ability to turn into objects in order to evade the fifth player, a killer who is taken to catch and prevent their escape. An open beta period on Steam lasted between October 15 and October 18, 2021, before the game's full release on December 1. The game was shut down on January 22, 2024, due to Fntastic's closure.

== Story ==
The game's plot is left deliberately mysterious, with the only detail given outside of the game being that "In a small provincial town, teenagers continue to disappear mysteriously." In an interview, Anna Vasilieva, the communication director of Fntastic, explained that Propnight "has its own mysterious lore, and we happily thought of a lot of little things that can be noticed while playing the game. I would not want to take away from the players the pleasure of building theories and guessing about everything for themselves."

== Gameplay ==
Propnight was a four-versus-one asymmetrical horror game. Four players played as Survivors, with the fifth player playing as the Killer. Survivors could transform into nearby props in the environment such as chairs, pots, and more in order to hide from the killer. The Survivors' objective was for at least one Survivor to escape the map. To do so, the Survivors needed to repair 5 of the 7 machines placed across the map, which in turn opened the map's exit. The Killer's objective was either to kill all 4 survivors, or prevent their escape. To catch a Survivor, the killer had to knock them down, then place them on a chair, where they would die if not rescued by another Survivor. Each survivor could only be rescued in this way twice; the survivor would die instantly if the survivor was placed on the chair a third time.

== Development ==
Propnight was developed using the Unreal game engine. After an open beta period which ran between October 15 and October 18, 2021, the game was released through Steam on November 30, 2021. On December 22, 2023, Fntastic ceased operations and announced that Propnight's servers would shut down on January 22, 2024.

It has support for 15 languages, including English, French, Italian, German, Spanish (Spain), Portuguese (Brazil), Spanish (Latin America), Polish, Russian, Swedish, Traditional Chinese, Simplified Chinese, Korean, and Japanese for the interface and subtitles.

== Reception ==
Reception

Review scores
Publication	Score
mmogames.com	6/10
NME	3/5

Aron Poter of NME wrote that while Propnight's premise "takes a while to get used to", he described it as "a fun spin on the established concept that knows how to make the action tense, challenging, and never without several hysterical moments thanks to the core prop copying mechanic

Some reviewers also criticised the game's various technical issues at launch. Rhett Roxl of Sirius Gaming in particular criticised the game's "very poor" implementation of motion blur and its inconsistent framerate, which according to him, "worsens immensely during intense moments."

== See also ==
- List of horror video games
- Dead by Daylight, a 2016 asymmetrical horror game with similar mechanics
- Evil Dead: The Game
- Friday the 13th: The Game
- Identity V
- Killer Klowns from Outer Space: The Game
- Predator: Hunting Grounds
- Radiant One, Fntastic's third game
- The Day Before, Fntastic's most recent game
- The Texas Chain Saw Massacre
