= Nexuiz =

2005 video game

- Developer: Alientrap
- Publisher: Alientrap
- Engine: DarkPlaces
- Platforms: Linux, FreeBSD, Microsoft Windows, OS X, AmigaOS 4, AROS
- Release: May 31, 2005
- Genre: First-person shooter
- Modes: Single-player, multiplayer

Nexuiz is a free first-person shooter video game developed and published by Alientrap. It was released on May 31, 2005, under the GNU General Public License (GPL) and uses the DarkPlaces engine, a modified Quake engine. A remake, also called Nexuiz, was released for Steam and Xbox 360 using CryEngine 3.

== Gameplay ==
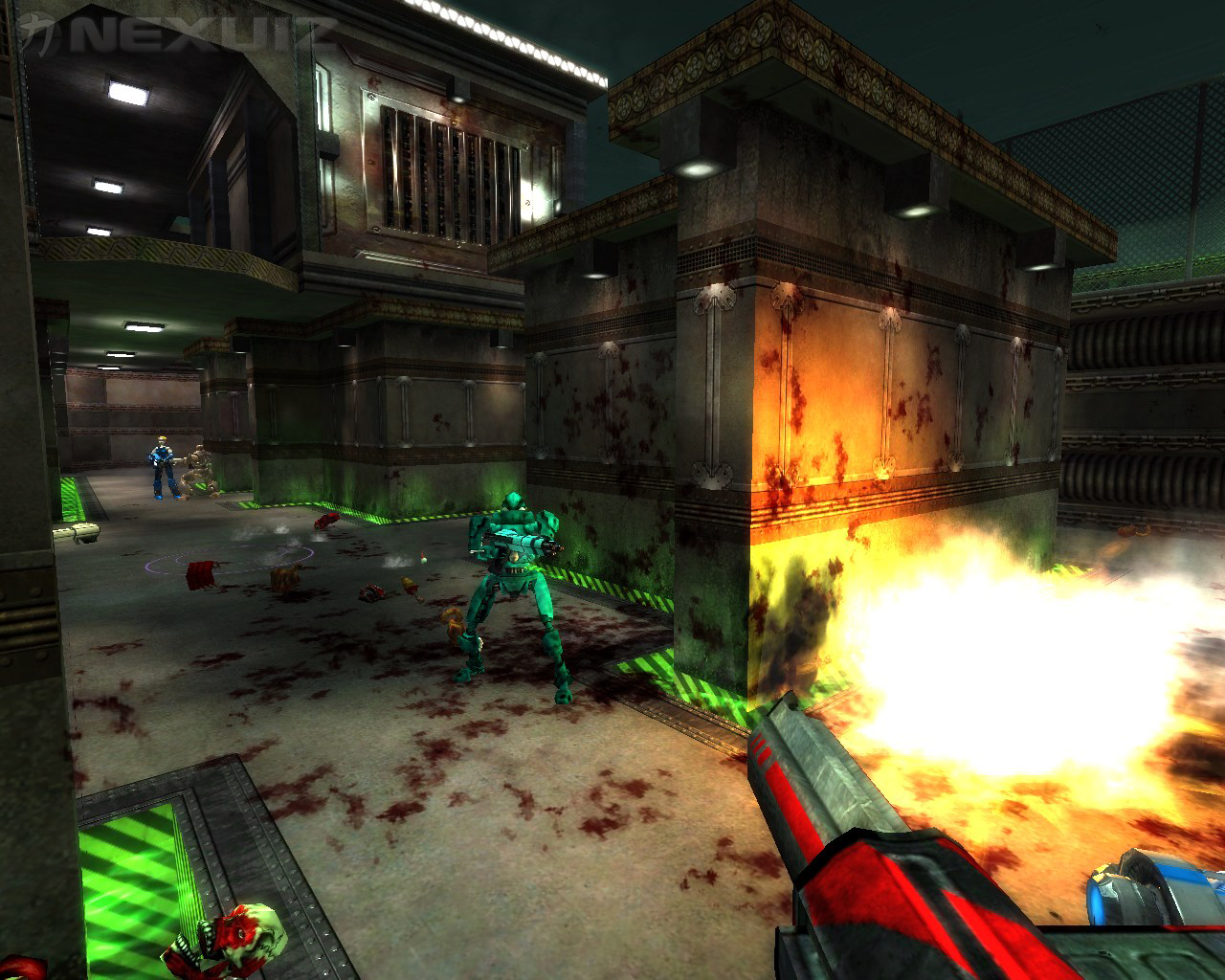
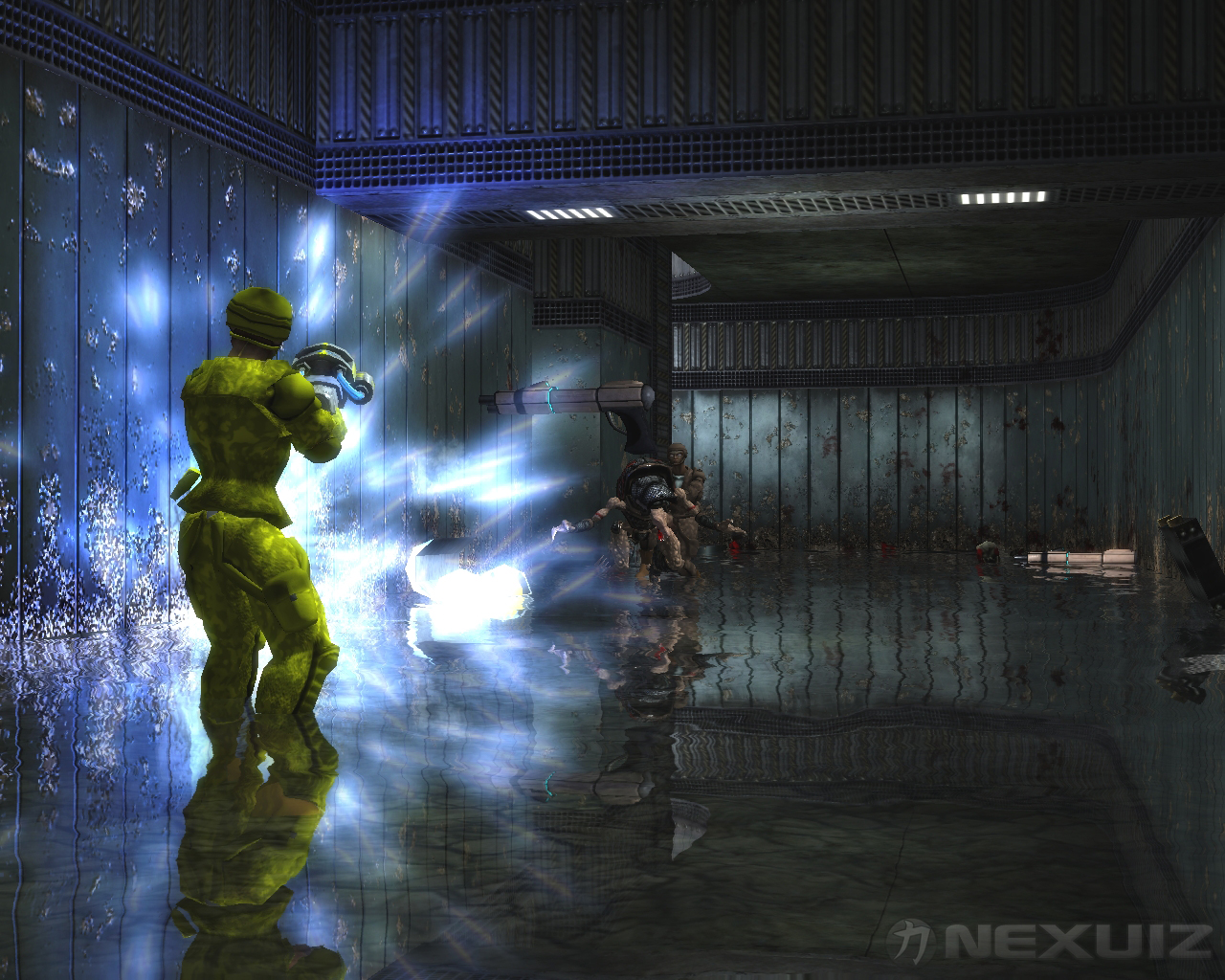
In-game screenshots

Nexuiz is primarily multiplayer, though it includes a full single-player campaign, which allows one to play through the various multiplayer game types and maps with bots. It allows for hosting and joining of games. It supports new gametypes, or whole conversions quickly applied to it (much like Quake).

== Development ==
Nexuiz development started as a Quake modification in the summer of 2001 by Lee Vermeulen. Soon afterward the project moved to the DarkPlaces engine created by Ashley Hale, who later also joined the project. The original design called for a simple deathmatch project with a few levels and one character model to be released the next summer. After four years of development with no budget, Nexuiz 1.0 was released on May 31, 2005, completely under the GNU GPL, and by the end of June had over 250,000 downloads. Development continued after the initial release, with 1.1 released soon after, 1.5 released February 14, 2006, 2.0 released June 14, 2006, and 2.1 September 9, 2006. On February 29, 2008, nearly three years after the initial release, version 2.4 was released and brought major improvements to both the GUI and the graphics engine. This includes all new GUI graphics elements, as well as reflective water and improved particles. In October 2008, a call was made for more developers for Nexuiz by the main (and only) QuakeC developer, who identified organizational issues associated with many users. Responses to this call highlighted the need for better documentation of QuakeC and the Nexuiz code, while also acknowledging the difficulty that documentation of this placed on the small team of Nexuiz developers. From mid-November 2008, a number of people expressed interest in continuing development of Nexuiz.

On March 1, 2010, it was revealed that IllFonic purchased the rights to the name Nexuiz. On March 22, 2010, the fork Xonotic of Nexuiz was announced. Many of the core contributors and community members of Nexuiz moved to this new project as they felt that sale of the name Nexuiz mishandles the original project. On July 13, 2010, Crytek announced that it had licensed the Cryengine 3 for IllFonic's Nexuiz.

== Reception ==
In the September 2006 issue of the magazine PC Gamer, Nexuiz was included in an article on Internet developers and free games impacting the industry. It also featured on the March 2007 Maximum PC and (version 2.4) was released on the May 2008 and August 2009 PC User cover disks. Upon the release of version 2.5 in April 2009, Phoronix deemed the game to be "the best open-source first person shooter we have ever played."

=== Competitive play ===
GameStop locations across the US held an in-store Nexuiz "PC gaming challenge". Interactive kiosks were set up in 10 different stores in 8 US cities. The kiosks gave users 2 minutes to earn the high score by doing the most damage possible to their AI opponents. The highest monthly scorer in each location won a $100 GameStop gift card. There were new maps every month, and each player was allowed one game per day. Game play was open to GameStop customers ages 13 and up, and ages 17 and above were eligible to win the monthly gift card for the high score. Cities with the Challenge were: Dallas, Miami, Chicago, Boston, Pittsburgh, Seattle, Los Angeles, and San Francisco.

== Remake and fork ==
On March 3, 2010, it was announced the name Nexuiz had been licensed to IllFonic for commercial release. This version was released on Xbox Live Arcade, PlayStation Network and Steam. While the game uses the same name, it adopts a futuristic, Victorian art style. It is based on CryEngine 3, instead of the DarkPlaces engine used in the original game. The main page of the game changed to reflect the commercial version of the game, rather than the open source PC game although it remains accessible. Community changes to the Nexuiz project initiated two free forks called Xonotic and later Rexuiz.

== See also ==
- List of free first-person shooters
- List of open source games
- Xonotic
- Quake
- Quake II engine
