= Breach & Clear: Deadline =

2015 video game

- Developers: Mighty Rabbit Studios; Gun Media
- Publishers: Gambitious Digital Entertainment; Devolver Digital (Note: Published by Mighty Rabbit Studios for PlayStation 4 and Xbox One.)
- Director: Joshua Fairhurst
- Composer: Jason Graves
- Platforms: Linux; Microsoft Windows; OS X; PlayStation 4; Xbox One
- Release: Windows, OS X, Linux: WW: July 21, 2015; PlayStation 4: NA: July 29, 2016 (retail); WW: August 4, 2016; Xbox One: WW: August 3, 2016
- Genres: Real-time tactics, action role-playing
- Mode: Single-player

Breach & Clear: Deadline (stylized as DEADline) is a 2015 post-apocalypse real-time tactics action role-playing video game developed by Mighty Rabbit Studios and Gun Media, and published by Gambitious Digital Entertainment and Devolver Digital. Home console ports released the following year. The title is a spin-off to the 2013 game Breach & Clear.

== Gameplay ==
In the game, players control a squad of four United States Army Special Forces soldiers trapped within a desolated city populated with zombies. Throughout the adventure, the group searches for survivors whilst fighting off hordes of infected and human mercenaries. Each of the four main characters may be controlled individually. The game is an open world title with the player being able to explore the whole city, looking for items, survivors and missions. Crafting and upgrades are present, allowing the troops to upgrade their gear for better features and sustainability in combat. A leveling system also exists.

== Story ==
In Harbor City, a United States Army Special Forces fireteam call-signed Raider-3 investigates a government science laboratory that had lost contact with local authorities. During the raid, the team encounters a zombie infestation and attempts to evacuate the laboratory, but perishes from the horde as the outbreak escalates. Meanwhile, another Special Forces fireteam call-signed Vergil 2-2 is tasked with securing an escape route for the U.S. Army personnel stationed at Fort Brigg (the game's fictional version of Fort Bragg). While attempting to scout Harbor City, the chopper carrying Vergil is shot down by a cult carrying military-grade weaponry, leaving the fireteam as the sole survivors of the crash in the Downtown district. Upon regrouping, the team finds themselves combatting hordes of zombies and hostile mercenaries allied with the cultists, finding pockets of allied survivors during their travels. After aiding the local downtown residents gather supplies, the team enters the Park district by navigating through the sewer systems, where Vergil helps stranded U.S. Army survivors gather explosive materials to collapse a cave serving as one of the zombie horde's breeding grounds. Upon completing this task, Vergil is ordered to recover the body of Patient Zero in the Suburbs in order to devise a cure for the zombie outbreak. Upon entering the suburbs, Vergil is embroiled in defusing a conflict by either aiding the cultists led by Donald Redding or aiding the cult's deserter, Callum Fenway. Depending on the faction aided, Vergil manages to secure a tissue sample (if they sided with Redding) or recovers Patient Zero's body (if they sided with Callum).

With the materials secured, Vergil aids a surviving pair of United States Marine Corps snipers deployed in the Harbor City Docks in destroying the last remaining cult group led by Malcolm Carter. Vergil also helps secure a cargo freighter in order to provide safe passage for the survivors and Fort Brigg personnel. The game ends when Vergil makes a decision to deliver the biological sample to Washington, D.C. personally or to stay in Harbor City to protect their family members.

== Publication history ==
The PlayStation 4 received a small physical print run through Mighty Rabbit's subsidiary, Limited Run Games. 3,000 copies were produced and sold on the distributor's website on July 29, 2016, six days before the game was released on the PlayStation Store.

On November 17, 2016, an updated version of the game, entitled Breach & Clear: Deadline Rebirth, was released, which overhauled most of the game's aspects and removed the online co-operative mode.

== Reception ==
Breach & Clear: Deadline received mixed reviews upon release, contrary to the generally positive scores its predecessor was awarded. IGN Italia gave the Windows version a 7.2. Reviewer Francesco Destri applauded the tactical gameplay and "exciting" dungeon crawling but took issue with the controls and team management of the four-man party.

The PC version currently has a score of 62/100 on Metacritic based on eight reviews.
