= IllFonic =

American video game developer

IllFonic, LLC
- Type: Private
- Industry: Video games
- Founded: 2007; 19 years ago in Denver, Colorado, US
- Founders: Charles Brungardt; Kedhrin Gonzales; Raphael Saadiq
- Headquarters: Golden, Colorado, US
- Number of locations: 2 offices (2026)
- Key people: Charles Brungardt (CEO); Paul Jackson (CTO); Gio Corsi (CPO)
- Number of employees: 78 (2019)
- Website: illfonic.com

IllFonic, LLC is an American video game developer based in Golden, Colorado, with another office in Tacoma, Washington. The studio was founded by Charles Brungardt, Kedhrin Gonzales and Raphael Saadiq in 2007. IllFonic is best known for developing asymmetric multiplayer games based on popular film franchises like Friday the 13th: The Game, Predator: Hunting Grounds, Ghostbusters: Spirits Unleashed, Killer Klowns from Outer Space: The Game, and most recently Halloween: The Game.

== History ==
IllFonic founder Charles Brungardt had been working with R&B artist Raphael Saadiq since exiting college, producing and engineering records. While working together, Saadiq confronted Brungardt with the idea of appearing in video games, based on which the game Ghetto Golf was conceptualized. Brungardt subsequently relocated from Los Angeles to Denver and, together with Kedhrin Gonzales, formed IllFonic out of a garage. Saadiq is also considered a co-founder. The studio moved around within Denver, from the garage to an apartment, then to offices above bars on Denver's broadway, before moving to proper offices by Speer Boulevard in the Golden Triangle in June 2013. On the night of March 5, 2010, a cannabis dispensary located next to IllFonic's offices was robbed. The Denver Police Department answered the alarm but incorrectly arrived at IllFonic's address, handcuffing three of its employees at gunpoint before the error was resolved.

In March 2010, IllFonic was announced to be developing Nexuiz, a remake of the game of the same name released by Alientrap in 2005. The remake was released in February 2012 for Xbox 360 and in May 2012 for Microsoft Windows, published through THQ Partners, part of publisher THQ. However, as THQ went through bankruptcy, the servers for Nexuiz' Xbox 360 version were shut down. The rights to the game then failed to be sold during THQ's bankruptcy auctions. In 2013, IllFonic was contracted to develop the "Star Marine" module and the first-person systems for the game Star Citizen. The game's developer, Cloud Imperium Games, planned to integrate these assets into the main game, however, after one year of work, discrepancies in the scales of the two studios' assets were found, making them incompatible. IllFonic continued working on Star Citizen, and their work was nearly completed by August 2015. That month, IllFonic laid off six developers, including three of those working on Star Citizen. In July 2013, IllFonic announced Revival, a massively multiplayer online role-playing game. The game's development was "indefinitely suspended" in March 2016.

In late 2014, IllFonic and publisher Gun Media announced Slasher Vol. 1: Summer Camp, an asymmetrical hide-and-seek-style action game. In early 2015, the game came to the attention of Sean S. Cunningham, the producer of the Friday the 13th series of films, who approached Gun Media to turn Summer Camp into a licensed game; the game was subsequently renamed to Friday the 13th: The Game. By this time, IllFonic had 50 employees. The game was released in May 2017 for Microsoft Windows, PlayStation 4, and Xbox One. However, a legal battle surrounding the Friday the 13th franchise rights was in progress, causing IllFonic to cease development of new content for the game by June 2018. A Nintendo Switch port of Friday the 13th: The Game was released in August 2019. Dead Alliance, a multiplayer first-person shooter, was developed by Psyop Games and IllFonic, and released by Maximum Games in August 2017. The game was previously known as Moving Hazard. In November 2018, IllFonic opened a second office in Tacoma, Washington, with an initial seven staff members. By January 2019, the Denver headquarters had been relocated to Golden, Colorado. Both offices collectively employed 78 people (38 in Golden and 40 in Tacoma) in July 2019, while the Tacoma office alone had 47 employees by November.

One of IllFonic's most recent games, Predator: Hunting Grounds, was released for Microsoft Windows and PlayStation 4 in April 2020. In January 2020, former Sony Interactive Entertainment executive Gio Corsi joined IllFonic as chief product officer. By this time, the company had also opened a third office in Austin, Texas.

== Games developed ==
Year	Title	Platform(s)	Publisher(s)
2012	Nexuiz	Xbox 360, Windows	THQ
2017	Friday the 13th: The Game	Nintendo Switch, PlayStation 4, Windows, Xbox One	Gun Media
2017	Dead Alliance	PlayStation 4, Windows, Xbox One	Maximum Games
2020	Predator: Hunting Grounds	PlayStation 4, PlayStation 5, Windows, Xbox Series X/S	Sony Interactive Entertainment, IllFonic
2021	Arcadegeddon	PlayStation 4, PlayStation 5, Windows, Xbox One, Xbox Series X/S	IllFonic
2022	Ghostbusters: Spirits Unleashed	PlayStation 4, PlayStation 5, Windows, Xbox One, Xbox Series X/S	IllFonic
2024	Killer Klowns from Outer Space: The Game	PlayStation 5, Windows, Xbox Series X/S	IllFonic
2026	Halloween: The Game	PlayStation 5, Windows, Xbox Series X/S	Gun Interactive

=== Supportive development ===
- Armored Warfare
- Crysis 3
- Evolve
- Sonic Boom: Rise of Lyric
- Star Citizen

=== Canceled ===
- Ghetto Golf
- Project Advena
- Revival
