= Identity V =

Multiplayer online RPG video game

- Developer: NetEase Games
- Publisher: NetEase Games
- Designers
- Manga

Identity V: Truth & Inference
- Written by: Netease
- Published by: Netease
- Published: 2021
- Volumes: 5(Ongoing)
- Manga

Identity V: Fifth Academy
- Written by: Netease
- Published by: Netease
- Published: 2020
- Volumes: Ongoing

- Arnold & Puppets
- Created by: Netease
- Platforms: Windows, Android, iOS
- Release: April 2, 2018
- Genre: Survival horror
- Mode: Asymmetrical multiplayer

Identity V
- Chinese: 第五人格
- Literal meaning: 'The Fifth Identity'
Transcriptions
Standard Mandarin
- Hanyu Pinyin: Dìwǔ réngé
- Bopomofo: ㄉㄧˋ ㄨˇ ㄖㄣˊ ㄍㄜˊ
- Wade–Giles: Ti^{4}-wu^{3} jên^{2}-ko^{2}
- IPA: [tî.ù ɻə̌n.kɤ̌]
Yue: Cantonese
- Yale Romanization: Daihńgh yàhngaak
- Jyutping: Dai^{6}-ng^{5} jan^{4}-gaak^{3}
- IPA: [tɐj˨.ŋ̍˩˧ jɐn˩.kak̚˧]

Identity V (Chinese: 第五人格; pinyin: Dìwǔ réngé) is a 2018 free-to-play asymmetrical survival horror video game developed and published by NetEase Games. The game was first released in China on April 2, 2018, and later globally released on July 5, 2018 for iOS users and July 11, 2018 for Android clients. It is currently available on the App Store, Google Play Store, and Windows systems.

The game features one-versus-four gameplay in which one player assumes the role of a Hunter, while four others play as Survivors. Survivors must cooperate to evade the Hunter and escape by decoding cipher machines to unlock exit gates, while the Hunter attempts to eliminate the Survivors.

== Gameplay ==
=== Core mechanics ===
Each match consists of five players divided into two factions: one Hunter and four Survivors. Survivors must decode five cipher machines to activate the exit gates, while the objective of the Hunter is to incapacitate Survivors before they can escape.

A match is won by the Hunter if at least three Survivors are eliminated. Survivors win if three or more escape. If two Survivors escape and two are eliminated, the match ends in a draw. Eliminated players may observe the remainder of the match as spectators.

Both Hunters and Survivors are selected from a roster of characters with unique abilities. Hunters also have access to secondary skills, while Survivors rely on teamwork, environmental interaction, and character specialization.

=== Progression and customization ===
Identity V includes several in-game currencies used primarily for progression and cosmetic customization. These include Clues, Fragments, Inspirations, and Echoes. Clues are earned through gameplay and can be used to unlock characters, while other currencies are used to obtain cosmetic items. Echoes are a premium currency purchased with real money. These systems do not directly affect competitive gameplay outcomes.

=== Persona ===
The Intrinsic Persona Web, commonly referred to as the Persona system, allows players to allocate talent points that provide passive or situational bonuses during matches. Separate persona trees exist for Hunters and Survivors. Players may allocate up to 130 points, which are permanently unlocked through game play progression.

=== Ranked matches ===
Identity V features two different ranking systems in the form of Character Points and Tier Divisions. Both are used only in Ranked Matches, available at specific time slots during the day.

Character Points are earned by playing ranked matches with a specific character and are used to determine one's spot on the leaderboards. Character Points are specific to each character and may slowly decrease over time. Character Points will also be reset when a new Season arrives. Through character points, players can earn character placements from those points, allowing players to receive badges. Badges can be earned for a specific character depending on the points earned.

Badges are then distributed every week, depending on the character's points. Survivors can obtain C badges (top 500), B badges (top 200), A badges (top 100), and S badges (top 10).

Identity V also features eight Tiers split into subdivisions, which players can be sent up and down depending on their performance. Winning ranked matches earns Rank Points, and losing loses Rank Points. Once a certain number of Rank Points is reached, the player can go up to the next subdivision if they gain Rank Points in their next ranked match. The tier bracket the player ends up in will determine what reward they get once the season ends. Similar to Character Points, Tier Divisions are reset when a new Season arrives.

Alongside normal Rank Matches, players can participate in Five Players ranking matches, available at specific time slots during weekends. The five players to play need to be teamed up before matching, and one must be a hunter. Five Players ranking mode uses a different set of Tiers and subdivisions but otherwise retains the same rules as normal Rank Matches. The win/lose depends on which team's survivor escaped the most.

=== Other game modes ===
Entertainment game modes, belonging to the Violent Struggle submenu, have their own rules and adjustments and commence on fixed hours during the day.

- In Duo Hunters/Pack Hunter, two Hunters team up against eight Survivors. Survivors gain an extra hit point; this game mode features telephone booths from which characters of both factions can directly purchase items with acquired game points to further strengthen their abilities.
- The Blackjack mode plays in the style of the card game Blackjack, with a different player becoming a Hunter in each round.
- In Tarot, a team of three Survivors (two Squires and a King) and one Hunter (playing as their team's Knight) face off against another team of the same composition, aiming to eliminate the opposing King before their rivals do. A special version, called Crystal Ball Tarot, gives certain characters temporary buffs by activating crystal balls.
- A fourth mode added in 2021, known as Chasing Shadows, features six Survivors who have to race against each other on an obstacle course. Survivors can team up into three teams of two to participate in the game mode.
- A fifth mode added in August 2022, called Frenzy Rhapsody, features six Survivors split into two teams and incorporates dodgeball elements into gameplay.
- A sixth mode was announced in August 2023, called Hide and Seek. The actual gameplay resembles prop-hunting, where two Hunters must find and eliminate six Survivors disguised as objects within 5 minutes.
- A seventh gamemode, Copycat, features a battle of wits between 10 players split into 3 factions: Detectives, Copycats, and Mystery Guests, each having their own winning conditions. The gamemode takes great inspiration from social deduction games, such as Mafia and Among Us.
- An eighth mode added in November 2024, called Final Blowout, primarily features the same elements of a standard ranked match, where survivors and hunters may ban characters. Players can also draw cards which gives them special powers such as faster decoding for the survivors, and faster attack recovery for the hunters.

== In esports ==
Since 2018, Tournaments and Esport competitions are hosted by NetEase, including global competitions such as COA, IVS, and regional professional league such as IVL for mainland China, IJL for Japan.

=== COA (Call of Abyss) ===
Call of Abyss (COA) is an annual global esport competition for identity V. It is the most important competition of the year.

== Setting ==
=== Story Mode ===
The player initially assumes the role of Orpheus, an amnesiac detective who, in the case of a missing memory, arrives at the Oletus Manor, the main setting of the game. The Oletus Manor is a large manor owned by a mysterious individual that holds "games" of the Hunter and the Hunted. Throughout the duration of his stay, Orpheus collects evidence from written records, or "diaries", allowing him to visualize "games" from a participant's perspective.

On October 28, 2021, NetEase released a major expansion pack called "Time of Reunion" that expanded the storyline, particularly Orpheus's past and his involvement in the manor games. On April 20, 2023, NetEase released Update 2.0, "Ashes of Memory", which changes the main character to Alice DeRoss, a journalist whose investigations lead her to the Oletus Manor.

In addition, a Manga series for the Truth & Inference series began releasing in 2021. Apart from this Manga there are also other web mangas such as Fifth Academy, there is also a Light Novel called Beneath the Truth. Netease has also announced a Manga to go over the main storyline although updates and release on it has been kept to a minimal. Netease has also made a animated short film called Arnold & Puppets that ran for 10 episodes.

The game has had many crossover events.

Identity V has collaborated with video game franchises Danganronpa and Persona, the film Edward Scissorhands, and the manga/anime series The Promised Neverland, Death Note, Junji Ito's Tomie, Mitsuji Kamata, Bungo Stray Dogs, Case Closed, and Frieren: Beyond Journey's End. There have been many crossovers exclusive to the game's Chinese servers, such as with Crazy Alien, McDonald's, Fei Ren Zai, and KFC.

From June to July 2022, Identity V featured a crossover event with the Chinese television series Link Click. Identity V has also collaborated with the game Project Zero II, lasting from November to December 2023. From February to March 2025, Identity V collaborated with the Arthur Conan Doyle Estate.

== See also ==
- List of horror video games
- Dead by Daylight
- Evil Dead: The Game
- Friday the 13th: The Game
- Killer Klowns from Outer Space: The Game
- Predator: Hunting Grounds
- Propnight
- The Texas Chain Saw Massacre
