= The Day Before =

2023 multiplayer survival horror video game

- Steam header
- Developer: Fntastic
- Publisher: Mytona
- Composer: Sigurd Jøhnk-Jensen
- Engine: Unreal Engine 5
- Platform: Windows
- Release: 7 December 2023 (early access)
- Genre: Extraction shooter
- Mode: Multiplayer

The Day Before was a multiplayer survival horror extraction shooter video game developed by Fntastic and published by Mytona. Set in the future, players controlled a character who must traverse and survive in the fictional, post-apocalyptic "New Fortune City", which has been overrun by zombies. It was announced on 29 January 2021 and released in early access on 7 December 2023 for Microsoft Windows on Steam.

The game's lengthy and turmoiled development led to questions of its legitimacy, and it drew early criticism for its perceived status as a scam. The development was marred by legal disputes involving Fntastic, as well as accusations of plagiarism and soliciting unpaid labour; Fntastic denied accusations of scamming and plagiarism. Former Fntastic developers later accused the studio's founders of severe mismanagement. Upon release, The Day Before was panned by critics for its technical issues, lack of creativity, and misleading advertising, as it originally marketed itself as a massively multiplayer online game, despite releasing as an extraction shooter. Four days after its release, it was removed from sale—with its servers remaining open until the following month—and Fntastic was closed due to its poor sales performance.

== Plot ==
The game is set in a post-apocalyptic United States. The world at large has been overrun by zombies in a pandemic. The player wakes in the fictional New Fortune City, which is set on the East Coast of the United States. They join other survivors in a colony to rebuild society.

== Development and release ==
The Day Before was first revealed in January 2021 with a gameplay trailer that showed the basic mechanics of the game. A gameplay trailer was released the following month in February, with Fntastic calling the game "a real breakthrough for the MMO survival genre". Fntastic co-founders Eduard and Aysen Gotovtsev appeared in that trailer, stating how the game will differ from others in the genre, such as increased realism through the GUI and open ended gameplay, concluding with how they "reinvented everything from the in-game goals to the ways we approach the quality of the game mechanics." On 15 October 2021 Fntastic announced the initial release date as 21 June 2022. On 5 May 2022, a month before the initial release date, a delay was announced, citing a planned switch from Unreal Engine 4 to Unreal Engine 5 as the reason. The new release date was set to be 1 March 2023.

By May 2022 The Day Before became the most "wishlisted" game on Steam. The following month, Fntastic updated their website to say that they are an organisation of both paid and unpaid "volunteers". While full-time volunteers received a salary, unpaid volunteers were compensated with "participation certificates" and free codes. Two days later on 29 June, in response to accusations of using unpaid labor for development, Fntastic released a statement to the gaming news website WellPlayed, saying "Volunteering at Fntastic means that a person works willingly for a common cause. We consider all team members, including employees, volunteers."

In January 2023 the page for The Day Before was pulled from Steam, with Fntastic stating on 25 January that there had been trademark issues surrounding the title of the game, and announcing that the release had been further delayed to 10 November 2023 for this reason. However, the studio's founders later told IGN that the delay had already been planned prior to them learning of the trademark disputes, and was to be announced via a new ten-minute gameplay trailer. They also denied claims that the game was a "scam", stating that they were being backed by Mytona and being evaluated on their progress regularly, and that "we didn't take a penny from people: no crowdfunding, no pre-orders, no donations".

On 2 February 2023, amid speculation over the status of the game, Fntastic released new gameplay footage. However, shortly afterward, videos relating to The Day Before were pulled from YouTube due to trademark complaints by a third-party. Fntastic later claimed that it was being targeted by the developer of a calendar app named "TheDayBefore". In August 2023 it was reported that Mytona and Fntastic had filed a trademark registration for the new title Dayworld. On 1 November 2023 it was announced that The Day Before would be released on Steam Early Access on 7 December 2023. By this time the aforementioned multiple delays, trademark disputes, Fntastic's soliciting unpaid labour, as well as allegations of plagiarism through asset-flipping led to some calling the game overly ambitious and mismanaged.

On 4 December 2023 Fntastic posted a statement on Twitter, reiterating that they had not scammed anyone as they had not solicited funding, and denied accusations of asset-flipping. On 11 December, four days after The Day Before launched to widespread criticism, Fntastic announced their closure, stating that as their game had "failed financially" they could not afford to continue operating. The Day Before was removed from sale on Steam a few hours later on the same day. The studio fully closed on 22 December and stated that all purchasers would automatically be refunded. The game's servers remained online until 22 January 2024, at which point they were shut down permanently. Following its release, a former employee of Fntastic stated that the game was never intended to be a massively multiplayer online game (MMO). Additionally, they claimed that the founders of Fntastic had controlled all aspects of the game's development, implementing "a lot of stupid ideas" and threatening developers with dismissal if they objected. After the game's shutdown in January 2024, other Fntastic developers stated that the game's design changed on a whim based on the most popular game releases over the course of development from the studio's founders, who absconded immediately after its release. They also claimed that the working conditions were harsh and included crunch, with the studio employing young programmers out of Eastern European countries with almost no pay (as it was likely their only opportunity to work in the video game industry), and that employees were fined for poor output.

== Reception ==
Reception

Review scores
Publication	Score
IGN	1/10
GamingBolt	1/10

Upon its early access release, IGN panned many of the game's aspects, and called it "wholly disappointing" and "easily one of the worst games [they've] ever played". Ed Nightingale of Eurogamer wrote that the "frame rate is appalling and pop-in is extensive, even with the city feeling soulless" and summarised "it's clear this is an incredibly basic game with little to it". Rick Lane of GamesRadar+ said, "There are no meaningful ideas, no distinctive mechanics, no creative stylistic choices, and certainly no compelling characters." Ravi Sinha of GamingBolt derided the game as "a disaster on every front".

The Day Before received "overwhelmingly negative" reviews on Steam, with players criticising its lack of melee combat, artificial intelligence, world design and scale, and technical issues. Others felt the game was akin to an extraction shooter, and not a MMO, as had been advertised. Its player count declined by 75 percent after two days of its release, and by 90 percent four days after release.

== Aftermath ==
In September 2024 Fntastic announced they were coming back with a "plan for recovery" for a "Fntastic 2.0". They said in a post on Twitter: "Everyone deserves a second chance. We deeply apologize to everyone for The Day Before and take full responsibility for what happened. Check out our plan, Fntastic 2.0, where we share how we'll fix our past mistakes and are preparing to return better", linking to a PDF document outlining their recovery plan, including moving to employing paid professionals instead of using volunteers. Fntastic started a new Kickstarter project for a game called Escape Factory, a physics-based game where cartoon-styled factory workers attempt to escape deadly traps. Polygon noted that the developers were returning with "bizarrely, the same tarnished name" and that the Kickstarter campaign seemed "destined to fail", only having raised $2,348 of the campaign's $15,539 goal in its first week, having 23 days to go. A demo of the game was released, and Fntastic was again accused of creating an asset flip, which Fntastic subsequently denied, saying that whilst some assets were used for VFX and code, all art and music was made by Fntastic. On 23 October 2024 Fntastic canceled the Kickstarter for Escape Factory due to lackluster interest but immediately announced a new game titled Items, an action-horror prop-hunt experience. Although Items is not currently slated for Kickstarter, Fntastic noted they might consider crowdfunding or other options once a demo is ready.

== See also ==
- Propnight, Fntastic's previous game
- List of video games notable for negative reception
- List of commercial failures in video games
