= Mytona =

Mobile game development and publishing company

- Industry: Video game industry
- Founded: 2012; 14 years ago
- Founders: Alexey Ushnitsky; Afanasey Ushnitsky
- Headquarters: Auckland, New Zealand
- Products: Seekers Notes, Cooking Diary, Chef & Friends, Ravenhill
- Website: www.mytona.com

Mytona is a mobile game development and publishing company headquartered in Auckland, New Zealand. The company operates internationally, with additional offices in Singapore, Thailand, Kazakhstan, and other locations.

== History ==
Mytona was founded in 2012 by brothers Alexey and Afanasey Ushnitsky. The founders’ work in game development began earlier in 2005, when they released their first title, an action game based on the Yakut heroic epic “Uolan Bootur the Swift”. Although the game did not achieve commercial success, it provided foundational experience for the team. In 2006, the brothers established Sulus Games, which initially consisted of approximately 50 local developers. Over the following seven years, Sulus Games developed more than ten projects for the Big Fish Games platform, primarily in the hidden object and time management genres. Several of these titles became popular among PC casual game audiences.

Following the expansion of the mobile gaming market, the founders shifted their focus to mobile development and established Mytona in 2012.

== Timeline ==
In 2012, Mytona was incorporated in Yakutsk, Russia, and entered the mobile gaming market. During this period, the company developed The Secret Society, a hidden object game released for mobile platforms.

In 2015, the company relocated its headquarters to Singapore. In the same year, Mytona began self-publishing and released Seekers Notes, a hidden object game set in the fictional town of Darkwood, which is shrouded in a mysterious curse. Players assume the role of the Seeker, a chosen individual who possesses a magical map and must uncover hidden objects, solve puzzles, and assist local residents to lift the curse. The game has maintained an active player community for over a decade and continues to receive regular updates and events. In 2024, to celebrate its ninth anniversary, Seekers Notes collaborated with YouTube Premium on a special in-game event.

In 2018, Mytona established its legal entity in New Zealand. The company released Cooking Diary, a time management game for mobile platforms In the game, players manage and expand their own restaurant, prepare various dishes, and serve customers within set time limits to earn in-game rewards. Players can customize their character and restaurant, participate in seasonal events, and join culinary guilds to compete with others. The game has received multiple awards, including the People’s Choice Award at the 15th International Mobile Gaming Awards in 2019 and the People’s Voice Award at the Webby Awards in 2020. In October 2020, Mytona collaborated with the streaming service Netflix to release a Cooking Diary x Stranger Things themed Halloween update.

In 2021, Mytona became an investor for another game developer studio and co-published two games on Steam. The partnership ended later in 2023. At the end of 2021, the company launched its own metaverse, Mytonaverse. The same year the company’s co-founders, Alexey and Afanasey Ushnitsky, were named among the Top 20 Most Influential People in New Zealand’s video-gaming industry by The New Zealand Herald.

In 2022, the company relocated its headquarters from Singapore to Auckland, New Zealand. Mytona began expanding its operations within the New Zealand game development sector.

In 2023, the company released another cooking game Chef&Friends. Chef & Friends is a free-to-play cooking and restaurant-renovation game.

In 2024, the company became a finalist for the award “Best places to work” in New Zealand. The company also re-released Ravenhill, a hidden object game originally released in 2015 and later discontinued. According to an industry interview published in 2026, the company stated that the relaunch included updates to the game’s interface, core features, and storyline.

In 2025, Mytona celebrated the 10th anniversary of Seekers Notes, marking a decade since the game’s original release with in-game events and community activities. The same year, the company launched a game development programme in partnership with Westlake Boys High School in Auckland.

== Legacy and closed games ==
Sulus Games period (2005–2011)

- Uolan Bootur the Swift
- Boxy Goxy
- Gems Quest
- Xango Tango
- Strange Cases: The Tarot Card Mystery
- Jewelleria
- The Missing: A Search and Rescue Mystery
- Strange Cases: The Secrets of Grey Mist Lake
- Burger Bustle
- Strange Cases
- The Lighthouse Mystery

Early Mytona titles (2012–2015)

- The Secret Society
- Strange Cases: The Faces of Vengeance
- The Torment of Mont Triste
- Royal Journey

Later discontinued titles (2019–2023)

- Riddleside: Fading Legacy
- Manastorm
- Crooked Pines
- Outfire
- Boom Guys
- Portal Kingdom
- Royal Merge 3D
- Mytonaverse
- Tasty Makeover
- Hublix
- Family Match
- Chef Tales
- The Day Before
