= Predator: Hunting Grounds =

2020 video game

- Developer: IllFonic
- Publishers: Sony Interactive Entertainment (PlayStation 4, Windows); IllFonic (Note: Managed since June 2026 by Balor Games)
- Producers: Russell Peterson; Nathan Vig
- Designer: Jordan Mathewson
- Programmer: Chance Lyon
- Artist: Cole Gray
- Writers: Jared Gerritzen; Chris Means; Jordan Mathewson
- Composers: Jamieson Trotter; Otto Andelin; Mark Rutherford
- Engine: Unreal Engine 4
- Platforms: PlayStation 4; Windows; PlayStation 5; Xbox Series X/S
- Release: PlayStation 4, Windows; April 24, 2020; PlayStation 5, Xbox Series X/S; October 1, 2024
- Genres: First-person shooter Third-person shooter
- Mode: Multiplayer

Predator: Hunting Grounds is a 2020 asymmetrical shooter game developed by IllFonic and originally published by Sony Interactive Entertainment. The game is part of the Predator franchise. Set in the remote jungles of the world, it tasks a team of four elite operatives with completing paramilitary operations before a single Predator can find and eliminate them. IllFonic assumed publishing duties on March 2024.

Predator: Hunting Grounds was the first Predator video game for home consoles since Aliens vs. Predator in 2010.

Arnold Schwarzenegger reprised his role as Alan "Dutch" Schaefer from Predator, Alice Braga reprised her role as Isabelle from Predators, and Jake Busey reprised his role as Sean Keyes from The Predator.

Predator: Hunting Grounds was released for PlayStation 4 and Windows on April 24, 2020. Upon release, the game received mixed reviews from critics. PlayStation 5 and Xbox Series X/S ports were released on October 1, 2024.

== Gameplay ==
Predator: Hunting Grounds is an asymmetrical multiplayer video game taking place in remote jungle locations. One player controls the Predator, while 4 others play as a team of special operations operators known as "Fireteam Voodoo" on a mission to collect intel or eliminate a drug lord until being forced to fight the Predator. The chief element is to either avoid being hunted by the Predator or capture and kill the Predator who in turn will be controlled by the player.

Objectives for Fireteam Voodoo include neutralizing computer-controlled NPC enemies, sabotaging their shipments and retrieving important VIP targets from them, as well as other special tasks. The game's maps offer various tactical opportunities for Fireteam players, from working together as a cohesive unit to splitting their force to reach their objectives. While this element of the game plays out, another player takes control of the Predator and tries to wipe out all of the special forces team members. If the human players manage to kill the Predator, their operation will be taken over by the Other Worldly Life Forms Program (OWLF) and they will be instructed to guard the body against hostiles until they can be extracted.

For the first time in a Predator game, players have the option of playing as a female Yautja.

The game includes a lootcrate system known a "Field Lockers", which are unlocked during gameplay and grant various appearance and weapon customization options for both Fireteam and Predator characters, including the flintlock pistol of Raphael Adolini (from Prey). Field Lockers are randomized and can contain duplicate items, in which case the duplicate item will be converted to additional in-game currency. As well as being a reward for increasing in rank, Field Lockers can also be purchased, either using "Veritanium", a form of in-game currency that can be earned through gameplay or found hidden within the game map. Items may also be purchased directly for Veritanium, although some of the rarer items can be many times more expensive than a single Field Locker.

Two characters from previous Predator films also return in paid DLC: Major Alan "Dutch" Schaefer (reprised by Arnold Schwarzenegger) from the original 1987 Predator and IDF sniper Isabelle (reprised by Alice Braga) from 2010's Predators. The Yautja Wolf from the Alien vs. Predator franchise is also included as a playable character.

== Release ==
Predator: Hunting Grounds was announced at a PlayStation State of Play livestream in May 2019. It was noted that the game will allow cross-play between PlayStation 4 and Windows. The beta version of the game was released on March 27, 2020 which was available until March 29, with the full game released on April 24. PlayStation 5 and Xbox Series X/S ports released on October 1, 2024.

== Reception ==
Reception

Aggregate scores
Aggregator	Score
Metacritic	PC: 62/100; PS4: 56/100
OpenCritic	20% recommend

Review scores
Publication	Score
Destructoid	6/10
Electronic Gaming Monthly	2/5
Game Informer	7.25/10
GameRevolution	3.5/5
IGN	5/10

=== Critical reception ===
Predator: Hunting Grounds received "mixed or average" reviews from critics, according to review aggregator website Metacritic. Fellow review aggregator OpenCritic assessed that the game received weak approval, being recommended by 20% of critics.

Tomas Franzese of Inverse reviewed the beta, calling it the "worst Sony game of this generation" and saying that the "game feels like a mess", and was visually outdated and unpolished. Jonathon Dornbush of IGN, who also played the trial weekend, noted the excessive wait times to get in to a game and said he hopes that IllFonic "can find a better balance to making the other objectives a bit more interesting".

=== Sales ===
In Japan, the PlayStation 4 version of Predator: Hunting Grounds sold 9,172 units, making it the tenth best-selling retail game during its first week of release in the country.

== See also ==
- List of horror video games
- Dead by Daylight
- Evil Dead: The Game
- Friday the 13th: The Game
- Identity V
- Killer Klowns from Outer Space: The Game
- Propnight
- The Texas Chain Saw Massacre
