= Phoronix Test Suite =

Free and open-source benchmark software

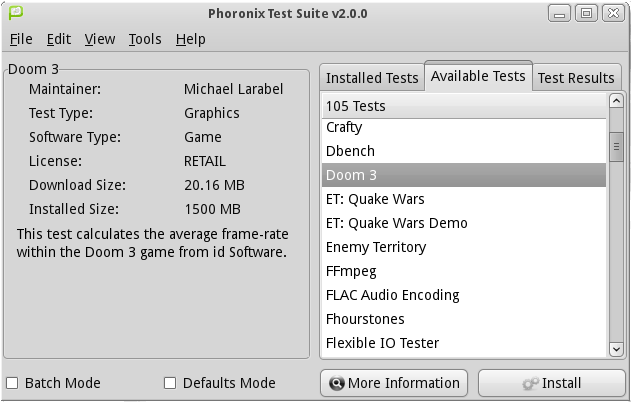
- Phoronix Test Suite 2.0.0 running on Linux
- Developers: Michael Larabel, Matthew Tippett
- Initial release: April 2008
- Stable release: 10.8.4 / July 3, 2022; 3 years ago
- Written in: PHP
- Operating system: Linux, FreeBSD, OpenBSD, NetBSD, OpenSolaris, Mac OS X, Windows
- Size: 703 kB (base program)
- Available in: English
- Type: Benchmark
- License: GNU General Public License v3
- Website: phoronix-test-suite.com
- Repository: Phoronix-test-suite on GitHub

Phoronix Test Suite (PTS) is a free and open-source benchmark software for Linux and other operating systems developed by Michael Larabel and Matthew Tippett.

== History ==
=== Website ===
Phoronix was started in June 2004 by Michael Larabel, who currently serves as the owner and editor-in-chief as a website with hardware reviews and guides, then moving to articles covering operating systems based on Linux and open-source software such as Ubuntu, Fedora, SUSE, and Mozilla (Firefox/Thunderbird) around the start of 2005. Phoronix focuses on benchmarking hardware running Linux, with a slant toward graphics articles that monitor and compare free and open-source graphics device drivers and Mesa 3D with AMD's and Nvidia's proprietary graphics device drivers. In June 2006, the website added forums to accompany news content. On April 20, 2007, Phoronix redesigned its website and began publishing Solaris hardware reviews and news in addition to Linux content.

=== Phoronix Test Suite ===
The first public release of PTS appeared in June 2008 and grouped 57 tests into 23 suites, covering areas such as audio and video encoding, kernel compilation and web workloads; early versions also supported uploading results to a central “PTS Global” repository for comparisons.

In March 2011, PTS’s creators announced OpenBenchmarking.org at SCALE 9x, building on the test framework to let users run tightly controlled benchmarks and correlate their results with automatically harvested details of the operating system, drivers and other components for more granular comparisons. The LWN.net report also documented the project’s definitions for “test profiles” and “test suites” used by PTS and other clients compliant with the OpenBenchmarking schema.

== Features ==
Phoronix Test Suite supports over 220 test profiles and over 60 test suites. It uses an XML-based testing architecture. Tests available to use include MEncoder, FFmpeg and lm sensors, along with OpenGL games such as Doom 3, Nexuiz, and Enemy Territory: Quake Wars, and many more. The suite also contains a feature called PTS Global where users may upload their test results and system information for sharing. By executing a single command, other users can compare their test results to a selected system in an easy-comparison mode. Before 2014, these benchmark results could be uploaded to the Phoronix Global online database, but since 2013, these benchmark results can be uploaded to openbenchmarking.org. Phoronix supports automated Git bisecting on a performance basis to find performance regressions, and features statistical significance verification.

== Platforms ==
PTS is installable on Linux, macOS, Windows, BSD variants, Solaris and GNU Hurd, enabling comparable workflows across heterogeneous environments.

== Components ==
=== Phoromatic ===
Phoromatic is a web-based remote test management system for the Phoronix Test Suite. It allows the automatic scheduling of tests. It's aimed at the enterprise. It can manage multiple test nodes simultaneously within a test farm or distributed environment.

=== Phoromatic Tracker ===
Phoromatic Tracker is an extension of Phoromatic that provides a public interface into test farms. Currently, their reference implementations autonomously monitor the performance of the Linux kernel on a daily basis, Fedora Rawhide, and Ubuntu.

=== PTS Desktop Live ===
PTS Desktop Live was a stripped-down x86-64 Linux distribution, which included Phoronix Test Suite 2.4. It was designed for testing/benchmarking computers from a LiveDVD / LiveUSB environment.

=== Phodevi ===
Phodevi (Phoronix Device Interface) is a library that provides a clean, stable, platform-independent API for accessing software and hardware information.

=== PCQS ===
Phoronix Certification & Qualification Suite (PCQS) is a reference specification for the Phoronix Test Suite.

=== Open Benchmarking ===
OpenBenchmarking.org is a web-based service created to work with the Phoronix Test Suite. It is a collaborative platform that allows users to share their hardware and software benchmarks through an organized online interface.

It is primarily used for performance benchmarking and testing hardware/software performance, typically in the context of Linux-based systems (unlike SoapUI, which is used for testing web services).

== See also ==
- Inquisitor
- Stresslinux
