= Dead by Daylight =

2016 video game

- Developer: Behaviour Interactive
- Publishers: Behaviour Interactive; 505 Games; Deep Silver; NetEase Games (mobile); Starbreeze Studios
- Directors: Ashley Pannell; Dave Richard; Mathieu Coté; Matthew Spriggens
- Producer: Stéfan Beauchamp-Daniel
- Programmers: Fadi Beyrouti; Jean-Philip Desjardins; Rémi Veilleux
- Artists: Filip Ivanovic; Marc Salha
- Writer: Farah Daoud-Brixi
- Composer: Michel F. April
- Engine: Unreal Engine 4; (2016–2024); Unreal Engine 5; (2024–present)
- Platforms: Windows; PlayStation 4; Xbox One; Nintendo Switch; Android (Note: Discontinued on March 20, 2025.); iOS; Stadia (Note: Discontinued on January 18, 2023.); Xbox Series X/S; PlayStation 5
- Release: June 14, 2016: Windows; WW: June 14, 2016; PlayStation 4, Xbox One; NA: June 20, 2017; AU: June 22, 2017; EU: June 23, 2017; Nintendo Switch; WW: September 24, 2019; Android, iOS; WW: April 17, 2020; Stadia; WW: October 1, 2020; Xbox Series X/S; WW: November 10, 2020; PlayStation 5; NA: November 12, 2020; EU: November 19, 2020
- Genre: Survival horror
- Mode: Multiplayer

Dead by Daylight is an online asymmetric multiplayer survival horror video game developed and published by Canadian studio Behaviour Interactive. It is a one-versus-four game in which one player takes on the role of a Killer and the other four play as Survivors; (Note: Playable characters in the game are categorised as either Killers or Survivors, always capitalised as though they were proper nouns.) the Killer's objective is to hunt and impale the Survivors on sacrificial hooks to appease a malevolent beast known as the Entity, which manifests both in physical form and spiritually, while the Survivors have to avoid being caught and power up the "exit gates" by working together to fix five separate generators. The game has featured crossovers with many different horror films, television series, and video games.

The game was originally released for Windows on Steam in 2016. It has since released for PlayStation 4, Xbox One, Nintendo Switch, Google Stadia, Playstation 5, and Xbox Series X/S. An iOS and Android version of the game, developed by NetEase, was available from 2020 to 2025. Swedish studio Starbreeze Studios published the game on behalf of Behaviour Interactive from 2016 until 2018, when Behaviour bought the publishing rights. The game was initially released on Unreal Engine 4 until it upgraded to Unreal Engine 5 in 2024.

Dead by Daylight received mixed reviews upon release but was a commercial success; it has since attracted more than 70 million players and improved its ratings. Since its release, Dead by Daylight has received various spin-offs, including three video games, two comic book miniseries, a physical board game, and a film adaptation in development with Blumhouse–Atomic Monster.

== Gameplay ==
A player (center) repairing a generator with a toolbox, with another Survivor on the right

Dead by Daylight is an asymmetrical horror game where one player is the Killer and the other four are Survivors. Matches are referred to as trials. The Survivors' objective is to escape the trial by repairing five of seven generators scattered throughout the map, which will power up the two exit gates. The Killer must impale all Survivors on hooks before they escape, which will cause them to be sacrificed to a malevolent force known as the Entity. When only one Survivor remains, an escape hatch opens at a random location on the map; if the Killer closes the hatch or an exit gate is opened, the two-minute "Endgame Collapse" begins, with the timer being extended if there are any incapacitated or hooked Survivors. When the timer ends, any remaining Survivors are immediately sacrificed to the Entity.

When hunting Survivors, the Killer must capture them by either striking them with their weapon twice and picking them up off the ground while they are in the dying state (one strike injures Survivors and a second strike puts them into the dying state) or by grabbing them in one move by catching them unexpectedly while they interact with objects such as generators. Survivors can only be unhooked by other Survivors, unless they have a perk that allows them to unhook themselves. If they are hooked a second time, they enter a phase in which they must resist the Entity as it attempts to take them out of the game by performing skill checks until they are either sacrificed or rescued. If they are hooked a third time, they will be sacrificed to the Entity.

The Survivors' movement options consist of sprinting, walking, crouch-walking, or crawling if they are in the dying state. They must elude the Killer by breaking their line of sight in a chase, or by successfully hiding from them. Most Killers can move at a pace that is slightly faster than that of a sprinting Survivor, but are slower in other forms of movement, such as vaulting over obstacles and windows, which can buy Survivors time. Survivors can throw down wooden pallets placed at key locations on the map, and if the Killer is close enough to the pallet when the Survivor throws it down, they will be stunned for a brief moment. The Survivor can then vault over the downed pallet, but only some Killers can do so, with most of them being forced to either break the pallet or go around it to continue the pursuit. The Killer also has an aura-reading ability that constantly reveals the location of generators, hooks, and sometimes even Survivors. Every Killer has their own unique power that can be altered using add-ons obtained through gameplay. A significant amount of gameplay revolves around chases, with Survivors using their environment and wits to outmanoeuvre the Killer and escape them, whilst potentially buying time for their allies to complete objectives.

Survivors can unlock chests to find useful items or bring items at the start of the trial, such as maps that highlight the locations of objectives, keys that can be used for certain aura-reading abilities or to re-open a closed escape hatch, toolboxes for quicker generator repairs and sabotaging hooks, medical kits for quicker healing, and flashlights that can be used to blind the Killer temporarily; the latter, if the Killer is carrying a Survivor without certain perks equipped, will let the Survivor escape. All Killers have an innate "terror radius" that surrounds them, the size of which depends on the Killer, the state of their power, and what add-ons or perks they may have. Survivors inside the radius will hear or visually see a heartbeat, which increases in intensity with proximity to the Killer. They can also see a red light called the "red stain" emanating from the Killer onto the ground in front of them, which reveals the direction they are facing and helps the Survivors determine where the Killer is coming from or going. Some Killers and perks grant the ability to suppress their terror radius and red stain under certain conditions, enabling them to surprise unaware Survivors.

=== Objectives ===
Survivor interactions with many objects in the game can trigger random skill checks. The player can either perform a good skill check, which has no effect, a great skill check, which speeds up the progression of the action the player is taking, or a failed skill check, which may notify the Killer of the Survivor's location and cause a loss of progress. Great skill checks require more precision and may not always be possible depending on the type of interaction or the perks being used by either the Survivor or the Killer. Killers have the ability to damage a generator if there are no Survivors working on it, which will slightly regress its repair progress and cause it to continue regressing slowly until a Survivor resumes repairing it, and may trigger certain perks.

If the Killer catches a Survivor, the Killer can pick them up and carry them to one of many sacrificial hooks scattered throughout the map. While being carried, the Survivor can attempt to wiggle out of the Killer's grasp by successfully hitting consecutive skill checks before they reach the hook. When a Survivor is hooked, they gain a hook stage up to a maximum of three stages; when they are hooked for the first time, they can wait to be rescued or attempt to unhook themselves. If they are left too long or hooked again, they will progress to the second stage, during which they have to succeed at skill checks before another Survivor rescues them. If a Survivor is hooked a third time or left long enough to progress to the third stage, they are sacrificed and removed from the match.

Once five generators are repaired, the exit gates are powered, allowing Survivors to open the gates and escape from the match. The trial only ends when all Survivors have either escaped or died. Players who have escaped or died can spectate by cycling through the remaining Survivors' points of view or return to the main menu. If only one Survivor remains, repairing generators is typically time-consuming and not practical when compared to finding the escape hatch that will appear somewhere on the map. If the Survivor finds this hatch first, they may escape through it, but the Killer can close it if they find it first. If the Killer closes the hatch, the exit gates become powered as though the generators were completed, allowing the remaining Survivor a way to escape the trial.

=== Perks ===
Survivors and Killers have the option to equip up to four perks each, which give their characters special abilities; each specific character starts off with a set of three perks that are unique to them, and each perk has three tiers, with its power increasing up to the third tier. There are hundreds of perks, and any combination of them can massively impact gameplay. Perks differ between Survivors and Killers; a Survivor perk may not be used by Killers and vice versa. Perks can grant Survivors powers such as the ability to take one extra hit without going down when injured, self-healing without a medkit at a reduced speed, briefly sabotaging sacrificial hooks without a toolbox, and more. On the other side, perks can prevent the Killer from being blinded, allow them to slow down a carried Survivor's efforts to escape their grasp, and block some generators for a short time.

There are a number of "general perks" that start unlocked for any character to learn. Perks, add-ons, and items can be unlocked through the Bloodweb, a skill tree where each character can spend in-game currency. Advancing to level 50 in a character's Bloodweb allows the player to "prestige" that particular character up to prestige 100. "Prestiging" resets the character back to level 1 of the next prestige level and unlocks the next tier of the character's unique perks for every other character the player owns. There are also special perks ("boons" for Survivors and "hexes" for Killers) which can alter gameplay when activated; hexes are either active from the start of the trial or activated by certain actions, and can be cleansed by Survivors, which deactivates them for the rest of the match. Boons do not activate until the Survivor blesses one of a handful of "totems" on the map, which a Killer can snuff out until a totem is blessed again.

=== Alternative game modes ===
The game received its first alternative game modes in 2024. These modes retain the base gameplay, but make certain additions. They are added to the game on a rotating basis.

The first was "Lights Out" featuring darker map settings and removes the ability to equip perks or bring items. This mode was playable in February 2024, September 2024, and August 2026. The September 2024 iteration was Castlevania themed. The second mode, "My Little Oni", was added during April Fools' Day 2024 and featured normal gameplay with the killer being extremely large and survivors being minuscule. "Chaos Shuffle" is a mode which randomizes the perks equipped for all players. It was playable in May–June 2024, September–October 2024, January 2025, March 2025, April–May 2025, June 2025, January 2026, and July–August 2026. The January 2025 iteration was Dungeons & Dragons themed, while the June 2025 version was The Witcher themed.

The "2v8" game mode features larger maps, a new class system, and lobbies of 10 players total. The first iterations were playable from July to August 2024 and in November 2024. The game mode returned in February–March 2025 with a Resident Evil theme. The May 2025 iteration of 2v8 was GhostFace themed. The November 2025 version was themed around Silent Hill and Castlevania. The February-March 2026 iteration was themed around Chucky. The April–May 2026 iteration was Attack on Titan themed. Another iteration was playable in August 2026 and the September iteration was themed around Alien.

== Setting ==
=== Premise ===
A group of four Survivors must elude one Killer obsessed with sacrificing them on hooks to a malevolent being called the Entity. The Survivors' perspectives are third-person, while most Killer's perspectives are first-person. (Note: The Good Guy was added to the game in 2023, becoming the first Killer to feature a third-person view. Later Killers incorporate third-person viewpoints including The Dark Lord, The First, and The Krasue.) The Survivors can only fight back by stunning the Killer or using items such as flashlights to blind them. Survivors can also vault over obstacles much faster than the Killer, providing a means of escape. Survivors use these obstacles and tools to help them elude the Killer for as long as they can. To escape, Survivors must repair five of the seven generators scattered across the map to power up the exit gates. They must then open the exit gates and escape through them; the final Survivor may also find an unmarked escape hatch to jump into, though the hatch can be shut if the Killer finds it first. Repairing generators can be made quicker through items such as toolboxes, repairing a generator alongside other Survivors, or if certain perks are equipped to help the process along.

=== Plot ===
The Entity, an eldritch horror that exists between dimensions, is attracted to actions of great violence and malice. The majority of Killers, most of whom are serial murderers or victims of tragedy, are pulled out of reality by the Entity and convinced or forced to do its bidding. To maintain its existence, the Entity requires sacrifices and demands that they hunt and kill the Survivors so it can feed off their emotions and steal a piece of their souls upon death. In order to continue this hunt, the Entity blocks off the gateways of death and puts the Survivors into a dreamlike state that leads them back to the Entity's purgatory-esque world to get hunted again.

The Survivors are pulled into the Entity's constructed world when they wander into the woods or explore abandoned buildings, disappearing from the real world without a trace. More recent Survivors have entered through other methods such as being taken right before they die or sending themselves there using witchcraft. They end up at a campfire in the woods, where they rest between trials until a Killer pursues them again. Each trial takes place in a series of realms constructed by the Entity of areas related to each Killer's history. Escaping from the grounds always takes the Survivors back to the campfire, and offerings can be created to be burnt at it and appeal to the Entity. Since the Entity feeds off of Survivors' hopes of escaping, it helps them just as much as it helps Killers, acting as an impartial observer of the hunt and stepping in only to claim those successfully sacrificed to it.

Each original Survivor and Killer also has their own individual backstory which explains their personality and their unique abilities, along with how they end up in the realm of the Entity. These backstories are expanded in "Tomes" where completing in-game challenges unlocks more information. These Tomes are released every few months alongside a battle pass known as "The Rift".

== Development ==
The first trailer for the game was released on March 2, 2016. After a closed beta released on May 29, the game was released for Windows on June 14, 2016. The game was released on PlayStation 4 and Xbox One in 2017, Nintendo Switch in 2019, and PlayStation 5 and Xbox Series X/S in 2020. The game was released on Stadia in 2020, and was available until Stadia's discontinuation in 2023. It became Steam Deck Verified (Note: Games that are confirmed to be compatible with the Steam Deck, including those with Proton and any middleware DRM solutions, that by default meet minimum performance specifications, are marked as "Verified". Dead by Daylight was previously marked as "Unsupported" due to it using EasyAntiCheat which did not work on Steam Deck until 2023.) in 2023. The Nintendo Switch version was ported to Nintendo Switch 2 in 2025. Cross-play between different systems was added in 2020. Cross-progression, allowing for the same user to access their account on different systems, was added in 2024.

Swedish studio Starbreeze Studios published the game from 2016 through 2018, when Behaviour Interactive bought the publishing rights. Italian company 505 Games publishes the Nintendo Switch version, while Austrian company Deep Silver publishes physical copies for the PlayStation 5 and Xbox Series X/S versions.

After the prototype of the game ran on a different engine, the game was ultimately released built on Unreal Engine 4. This engine was used until April 2024, when the game updated to Unreal Engine 5. An in-game store, with accompanying microtransactions, was added in 2018. A battle pass system was added in 2019. Free updates have been provided continuously since the games launch, with large updates such as a years-long visual upgrade beginning in 2020 and a quality of life initiative taking place in 2025.

== Downloadable content ==
As of August 2026, the game has featured 51 individual DLC releases in total. Most DLC releases include both a new Survivor and Killer, except for eleven where only one character was introduced and four where three characters were introduced. Of the DLCs released, 27 have also introduced new maps that are accessible to all players. The DLCs can be acquired by either purchasing them with money or in the in-game store, which was added to the game in June 2018. Non-licensed characters and cosmetic items can be purchased for free using an in-game currency called iridescent shards, also added to the game in June 2018. Three DLCs (The Last Breath, Left Behind, and A Lullaby for the Dark) have been distributed for free. Before the release of every DLC since Curtain Call, a Public Test Build (PTB) becomes available to players on Steam, which allows the developers to test new content and receive community feedback on major upcoming changes.

Alongside original characters, the game licenses characters and settings from several different franchises. Among the currently released DLCs, 24 have featured licensed Killers and Survivors from films, television, and other video games. The game's success has been attributed, at least in part, to the game's collaborations with these franchises, and it is nicknamed the "hall of fame of horror" due to its wide cast of horror icons from popular media.

In addition to DLCs, other collaborations have resulted in purely cosmetic items being added to existing characters. Collaborations with Crypt TV, Attack on Titan, Junji Ito, The Witcher, The Boulet Brothers' Dragula, Nyaight of the Living Cat, and Scooby-Doo added cosmetic items to original characters to make them resemble characters from those franchises. Cosmetic items have also been added from video game franchises such as Gradius, Half-Life, For Honor, Meet Your Maker, PUBG: Battlegrounds, Rainbow Six Siege, Naughty Bear, Balatro, Karma: The Dark World, It Has My Face, Darkest Dungeon, Nier: Automata, and Diablo. Collaborations with real people have resulted in cosmetic items inspired by video game artist Ikumi Nakamura, art studio Domrebel, heavy metal bands Iron Maiden, Slipknot, and Ice Nine Kills, as well as actor Nicolas Cage being a playable Survivor.

=== Controversies and removals ===
In August 2021, Behaviour announced that the Stranger Things DLC (including individual characters from the DLC and their cosmetics) would no longer be available for purchase after November 17 and that the Hawkins National Laboratory map would be removed from rotation. All characters from the DLC, as well as their cosmetics, remained usable by players who purchased them before the removal date. No official reason was given for the chapter's removal; observers hypothesized that Netflix, the owner of the Stranger Things license, decided to not renew the license for the game with Behavior due to its focus on their own Netflix Games brand. All Stranger Things content returned to the game in a surprise move on November 6, 2023, and added a second DLC chapter on January 27, 2026.

In January 2022, Behaviour announced the removal of the four face mask cosmetics for The Cannibal belonging to the Leatherface DLC due to reports of racial harassment. Players of The Cannibal reportedly wore the mask of black survivor Claudette Morel as digital blackface and harassed BIPOC content creators and players through in-game actions and post-game chats. Following the removal of the masks later that month, players who had previously purchased the cosmetics were compensated with in-game currency.

On October 18, 2021, NFT company Boss Protocol released an NFT using The Cenobite character model from Dead by Daylight, which came days after Steam announced a ban on games containing NFTs, blockchains, and cryptocurrencies on October 15th. This led to criticism from players, with the DLC being review bombed to a "Mostly Negative" rating on Steam. Behaviour announced the release of the NFT on their social media pages with a chance for players to earn a free copy of the Hellraiser chapter upon purchase; Behaviour later clarified that it had agreed to give access to The Cenobite character model to anyone who held the rights to the character, and that Boss Protocol had subsequently created the NFT without Behaviour's involvement. Two months later, Boss Protocol lost the rights back to English author Clive Barker, who created the character. Initially, an uncredited voice actor voiced The Cenobite, though Doug Bradley later reprised the role of the character following an in-game update. Due to licensing issues, all Hellraiser content was removed from the game on April 4, 2025. The Cenobite and his Chatterer cosmetic are still available to players who purchased them before this date. The removal came a few months before the announcement of Hellraiser: Revival, characterized as the "first true Hellraiser game" by Saber Interactive.

Cosmetic items from Attack on Titan were added to the game in July 2022 and removed from the in-game store in July 2023. All Attack on Titan content returned to the game on October 9, 2025.

In December 2025, Behaviour announced that the Halloween DLC (including individual characters from the DLC and their cosmetics) would no longer be available for purchase after January 19, 2026. Characters from the DLC, as well as their cosmetics, will remain usable by players who purchased them before the removal date; however, the Haddonfield map is no longer playable. The announcement came a few months before Halloween: The Game from Illfonic and Gun Media was set to be released.

In October 2026, Behavior announced that the Chucky DLC would no longer be available for purchase after November 24, 2026. Characters from the DLC, as well as their cosmetics, will remain usable by players who purchased them before the removal date.

=== List ===
† This symbol denotes DLCs that contain licensed content.

Downloadable content for Dead by Daylight
Title	Release date	Killer	Survivor(s)	Map (Realm)	Ref.
The Last Breath	August 18, 2016	The Nurse (Note: Mephisto)	Nea Karlsson	Disturbed Ward (Crotus Prenn Asylum)	
Halloween † ^{[a]}	October 25, 2016	The Shape	Laurie Strode	Lampkin Lane (Haddonfield)	
Of Flesh and Mud	December 8, 2016	The Hag (Note: The Birch)	Ace Visconti	The Pale Rose (Backwater Swamp)	
Left Behind †	March 8, 2017	—	William "Bill" Overbeck	—	
Spark of Madness	May 11, 2017	The Doctor (Note: The Look-See, Pharaoh Eddie)	Feng Min	Treatment Theatre (Léry's Memorial Institute)	
A Lullaby for the Dark	July 27, 2017	The Huntress (Note: The Mordeo, Facemelter Eddie)	David King	Mother's Dwelling (Red Forest)	
Leatherface †	September 14, 2017	The Cannibal	—	—	
A Nightmare on Elm Street †	October 26, 2017	The Nightmare	Quentin Smith	Badham Preschool (Springwood)	
Saw †	January 23, 2018	The Pig	David Tapp	The Game (Gideon Meat Plant)	
Curtain Call	June 12, 2018	The Clown	Kate Denson	Father Campbell's Chapel (Crotus Prenn Asylum)	
Shattered Bloodline	September 18, 2018	The Spirit (Note: Tomie Kawakami, Bubble Head Nurse)	Adam Francis	Family Residence (Yamaoka Estate)	
Darkness Among Us	December 11, 2018	The Legion (Note: HUNK)	Jeffrey "Jeff" Johansen	Mount Ormond Resort (Ormond)	
Demise of the Faithful	March 19, 2019	The Plague	Jane Romero	Temple of Purgation (Red Forest)	
Ash vs Evil Dead †	April 2, 2019	—	Ashley "Ash" Williams	—	
Ghost Face †	June 18, 2019	The Ghost Face	—	—	
Stranger Things † ^{[a]}	September 17, 2019	The Demogorgon	Steve Harrington (Note: Jonathan Byers), Nancy Wheeler (Note: Robin Buckley)	Underground Complex (Hawkins National Laboratory)	
Cursed Legacy	December 3, 2019	The Oni (Note: Samurai Eddie, Murderous Grizzly)	Yui Kimura	Sanctum of Wrath (Yamaoka Estate)	
Chains of Hate	March 10, 2020	The Deathslinger (Note: Stranger Eddie)	Zarina Kassir	Dead Dawg Saloon (Grave of Glenvale)	
Silent Hill †	June 16, 2020	The Executioner	Cheryl Mason (Note: Alessa Gillespie, Lisa Garland, Cybil Bennett, James Sunderland, Maria, Hinako Shimizu)	Midwich Elementary School (Silent Hill)	
Descend Beyond	September 8, 2020	The Blight (Note: William Birkin)	Felix Richter	—	
A Binding of Kin	December 1, 2020	The Twins	Élodie Rakoto	—	
All-Kill	March 30, 2021	The Trickster	Lee Yun-jin	—	
Resident Evil †	June 15, 2021	The Nemesis	Leon S. Kennedy (Note: Chris Redfield, Carlos Oliveira), Jill Valentine (Note: Claire Redfield, Sheva Alomar)	Raccoon Police Station (Raccoon City)^{[b]}	
Hellraiser † ^{[a]}	September 7, 2021	The Cenobite (Note: Chatterer)	—	—	
Hour of the Witch	October 19, 2021	—	Mikaela Reid	—	
Portrait of a Murder	November 30, 2021	The Artist (Note: Miss Fuchi, Boulet Artist, Lilith)	Jonah Vasquez	Eyrie of Crows (Forsaken Boneyard)	
Sadako Rising †	March 8, 2022	The Onryō	Yoichi Asakawa	—	
Roots of Dread	June 7, 2022	The Dredge (Note: Eddie's Tribute, Belial)	Haddie Kaur	Garden of Joy (Withered Isle)	
Resident Evil: Project W †	August 30, 2022	The Mastermind	Ada Wong, Rebecca Chambers	Raccoon City Police Station East Wing/West Wing (Raccoon City)^{[b]}	
Forged in Fog	November 22, 2022	The Knight	Vittorio Toscano (Note: Geralt of Rivia)	Shattered Square (Decimated Borgo)	
Tools of Torment	March 7, 2023	The Skull Merchant	Thalita Lyra, Renato Lyra (Note: Tubarão)	—^{[c]}	
End Transmission	June 13, 2023	The Singularity	Gabriel Soma	Toba Landing (Dvarka Deepwood)	
Nicolas Cage †	July 25, 2023	—	Nicolas Cage	—	
Alien †	August 29, 2023	The Xenomorph (Note: Xenomorph Queen, Xenomorph King, Xenomorph Clone, Grid)	Ellen Ripley (Note: Ripley 8, Rain Carradine, William Hudson)	Nostromo Wreckage (Dvarka Deepwood)	
Chucky † ^{[a]}	November 28, 2023	The Good Guy (Note: Tiffany Valentine)	—	—	
Alan Wake †	January 30, 2024	—	Alan Wake (Note: Mr. Scratch, Saga Anderson, Rose Marigold)	—	
All Things Wicked	March 12, 2024	The Unknown	Sable Ward	Greenville Square (Withered Isle)	
Dungeons & Dragons †	June 3, 2024	The Lich	Aestri Yazar, Baermar Uraz	Forgotten Ruins (Decimated Borgo)	
Tomb Raider †	July 16, 2024	—	Lara Croft	—	
Castlevania †	August 27, 2024	The Dark Lord	Trevor Belmont (Note: Leon Belmont, Simon Belmont, Richter Belmont, Alucard, Soma Cruz)	—	
Doomed Course	November 28, 2024	The Houndmaster	Taurie Cain	—^{[d]}	
Tokyo Ghoul †	April 2, 2025	The Ghoul (Note: Rize Kamishiro)	—	—	
Steady Pulse	May 6, 2025	—	Orela Rose	—	
Five Nights at Freddy's †	June 17, 2025	The Animatronic (Note: Yellow Rabbit, Glitchtrap)	—	Freddy Fazbear's Pizza (Withered Isle)	
The Walking Dead †	July 29, 2025	—	Rick Grimes (Note: Daryl Dixon, Glenn Rhee, Negan Smith), Michonne Grimes (Note: Maggie Rhee)	Fallen Refuge (Withered Isle)	
Sinister Grace	September 23, 2025	The Krasue	Vee Boonyasak	—	
Stranger Things Chapter 2 †	January 27, 2026	The First	Eleven, Dustin Henderson (Note: Eddie Munson)	—	
All-Kill: Comeback	March 17, 2026	—	Kwon Tae-young	Trickster's Delusion (Sleepless District)	
Jason †	June 16, 2026	The Slasher	—	—	
The Life Road	June 25, 2026	—	Shane Wiigwaas	—	
Chorus of Sin	August 25, 2026	The Judgment	Aurora Stardotter	—	
Terrifier †	November 24, 2026	The Terrifier	Sienna Shaw	—	
The Casting of Frank Stone	March 2027	The Champion	TBA	—	

Notes

a.^{^} ^{^} Chapters which were at one point removed for purchase. Players who purchased the characters before the chapter's removal were able to continue playing the characters in game, although associated maps were removed from all modes. The Stranger Things chapter was made unavailable with its removal on November 17, 2021, before ultimately being returned to the game on November 6, 2023, with the Hellraiser, Halloween, and Chucky chapters being unavailable since their respective removals on April 4, 2025, January 19 and November 24, 2026.
b.^{^} ^{^} The Raccoon City Police Station map was introduced in the Resident Evil chapter. With the release of the Resident Evil: Project W chapter, it was permanently replaced with two separate maps which split the original map into its East and West halves.
c.^{^} The Shelter Woods map was introduced with the release of the game in 2016. However, with the release of the Tools of Torment chapter, the map was redesigned with a new landmark, The Hunting Camp, being added to the map. This landmark is modeled after The Skull Merchant's background lore and is featured in chapter's marketing materials.
d.^{^} Although it was initially announced that the Doomed Course would have an accompanying new map, ultimately no map released with the chapter. Instead, the Lake Ormond Mine (Ormond) map was released two weeks after the chapter as part of the annual winter event.

== Reception ==
Reception

Aggregate score
Aggregator	Score
Metacritic	PC: 71/100; PS4: 64/100; XONE: 58/100; NS: 61/100

Review scores
Publication	Score
GameSpot	PC: 9/10
IGN	9/10
PC Gamer (UK)	88/100

Dead by Daylight received "mixed or average reviews", according to review aggregator Metacritic. GameSpot awarded it a score of 9 out of 10, saying, "At launch, Dead by Daylight suffered because it relied on peer-to-peer hosting and absent social features, but over time it rectified these issues. And while a brief and premature tussle with skill-based matchmaking turned the new player experience into a bit of a horror show (a problem which is now [was] fixed), thanks to its community of players, Dead by Daylight is without peer in the asymmetrical competitive multiplayer arena, and has grown into one of the most robust horror experiences around." Luke Winkie of PC Gamer awarded it a score of 88 out of 100, saying, "In the five years since Behaviour Interactive released Dead by Daylight on Steam, the game has developed razor-sharp mechanical intrigue, an ultra-complex web of versatile builds and strategies, and a diverse suite of characters, each equipped with relative strengths and weaknesses."

=== Sales ===
During its first week, Dead by Daylight sold more than 270,000 copies. The game sold more than 1 million copies within 2 months. On November 16, 2017, more than 3 million copies were sold. As of May 2019, the game sold more than 5 million copies. In August 2020, the game reached more than 25 million players across all platforms. This number reached 36 million by May 2021, 50 million by May 2022, and 60 million by November 2023. Ahead of the game's tenth anniversary in June 2026, Behavior announced that the game had 70 million players over its lifetime, averages a million daily players, and claimed it to be "the most played horror game in history."

=== Popularity and impact ===
Due to Behaviour catering to Japanese players with the release of Japanese-themed chapters and expanding the lore of its in-game universe, which Japanese gamers tend to favor, Japan has become one of the biggest markets for the game. The Entity Café, a Dead by Daylight-themed café, opened on the fourth floor of the Tokyo Skytree in August 2021.

The heavy metal band Ice Nine Kills released a single, "Play Dead", in collaboration with Dead by Daylight. The single features the words "dead by daylight" throughout, while the accompanying music video features performers dressed as characters from the game.

Original Dead by Daylight characters and items have appeared in other video games. In Payday 2, Dead by Daylight initially launched with an optional "Deluxe Edition" for an additional price, which granted cosmetics for Payday 2 as well as a discount for Payday 2 owners who pre-ordered the game. The Ubisoft fighting game For Honor featured a crossover event called "Survivors of the Fog" from October 21 to November 11, 2021, which featured Dead by Daylight-inspired cosmetic items and a limited-time game mode that featured the Trapper as an AI-controlled enemy. From October 21 to November 7, 2022, PUBG: Battlegrounds featured a crossover event with Dead by Daylight which saw the traditionally battle royale game introduce a new mode in which players would repair generators and escape from the killer, alongside cosmetics that emulate certain survivors and killers from the game. The mobile port of Battlegrounds, New State Mobile, also received a similar event. By playing at least one match of the special PUBG game mode, players were given a unique code to unlock cosmetics in Dead by Daylight. Other video games in which Dead by Daylight characters or cosmetic items inspired by the game appeared were Deathgarden, Meet Your Maker, Move or Die, Rainbow Six Siege, Balatro, Assassin's Creed Shadows, and Quarantine Zone: The Last Check.

== Mobile release ==
On June 19, 2019, Behaviour Interactive Inc. announced the plan to release Dead by Daylight on iOS and Android for free in an attempt to make the game more accessible to players around the world. A different development team was formed that was fully dedicated to optimizing the game for the mobile experience. Dead by Daylight Mobile was initially slated for launch in 2019; however, the developers had to push the release to 2020, citing their need for more time to work on bugs and optimize. On February 27, 2019, Behaviour announced that the mobile versions would be published by Chinese video game publisher NetEase Games in Southeast Asia, Japan, and Korea. It was released in EMEA, the Americas, and South Asia on April 16, 2020. In December 2022, Behaviour Interactive announced that an improved global version was being co-developed by Behaviour and NetEase Games. The old global version was removed from mobile storefronts on December 16, 2022, and the improved global version was released on March 15, 2023, after being delayed from a February 2023 planned release. This new version included enhanced graphics and would come to feature exclusive game modes, features, and skins only available in the mobile version of the game.

In its 48 hours of release, Dead by Daylight Mobile outnumbered 1 million downloads. By October 2020, the game surpassed 10 million downloads. By May 2022, the game reached 25 million downloads. The game was banned by the government of India in March 2023. In December 2024, NetEase announced that Dead by Daylight Mobile would permanently shut down by March 2025. It was removed from iOS and Android storefronts in January 2025 and became inaccessible on March 20, 2025.

== Spin-offs and other media ==
=== Video games ===
==== Hooked on You: A Dead by Daylight Dating Sim ====
Hooked on You: A Dead by Daylight Dating Sim is a visual novel dating simulator game released on August 3, 2022. The parodic game is developed by Psyop and allows the player to date four of Dead by Daylight's original Killers, the Trapper, the Huntress, the Wraith, and the Spirit, guided by original Survivors such as Dwight and Claudette. Cosmetic items inspired by Hooked on You were added to the main game in 2022.

==== What the Fog ====
What the Fog is a co-op roguelike game released on May 14, 2024, after being revealed the same day. Following the original survivors Dwight, Claudette, and Feng Min, players must defeat enemies in order to power up generators and escape. The game was released for free for those with an account on Behavior.com or was made purchasable through Steam.

==== The Casting of Frank Stone ====
The Casting of Frank Stone is a single-player interactive drama horror game released on September 3, 2024. The game is developed by Supermassive Games, known for developing similar interactive horror games including Until Dawn, The Quarry, and The Dark Pictures Anthology. Featuring a branching narrative, players follow the stories of different characters set across multiple time periods, all centering around the killer Frank Stone and the paranormal Entity. Initially, Frank Stone was announced to be added to Dead by Daylight in September 2025 as a legendary skin for The Trapper. Due to poor fan reception, this was scrapped, and Frank Stone will instead be added in its own chapter as a new killer.

==== Project T ====
An untitled spin-off game was announced on May 19, 2023, described as a four-player co-op PvE experience "centered around greed and the lust for power." Midwinter Entertainment, a Seattle-studio Behavior Interactive acquired in May 2022, was developing the game. On May 14, 2024, the game's working title was revealed as Project T along with development footage revealing the game as a third-person shooter. Limited playtests were held during the summer of that year. On September 17, 2024, it was announced that Project T had been canceled following "unsatisfactory" results from the prior playtests. The same day, Behavior Interactive announced that Midwinter Entertainment was closing.

==== Dead by Daylight Pinball ====
Zen Studios released a Dead by Daylight pinball table for Pinball M on November 30, 2023. Players can choose to play as either killer or survivor, with 4 survivors to choose from.

=== Board game ===
A board game adaptation, Dead by Daylight: The Board Game, was created by Level 99 Games and distributed by Asmodee in the United States. Featuring original characters up through the All Kill chapter from the original video game, one player takes on the role of the killer and two to four players take on the role of survivors. Players use perks, items, props, and powers to traverse the map to either repair generators and escape or hunt down and kill the survivors. Following a successful fundraising campaign on Kickstarter, the game was released on April 7, 2023. Multiple expansions were released between 2024 and 2026, each adding further playable characters from the original video game and new game mechanics.

=== Comic series ===
On October 29, 2022, Behaviour Interactive tweeted an announcement for a comic series featuring the four members of The Legion, which details more of their backstory. It is published by Titan Comics, written by Nadia Shammas, illustrated by Dillon Snook, and colored by Emilio Lecce. The first issue was released on June 14, 2023. The fourth and final issue was released on March 6, 2024. Each issue follows a different member of The Legion.

A second series was announced in December 2025, which will follow The Hillbilly. Again published by Titan Comics, the series is written by Derek Fridolfs, illustrated by Dean Kotz, and colored by Allison Hu. The first issue was released in April 2026.

=== Film adaptation ===
In March 2023, it was reported by Variety that Jason Blum and James Wan were producing a film adaptation through their Blumhouse Productions and Atomic Monster banners, respectively alongside Behaviour Interactive. In a January 2024 interview, executive producer Ryan Turek commented that the film would be informed by lessons learned from the studio's recent Five Nights at Freddy's film adaptation and to prioritize making "a video game adaptation for the fans". Jason Blum commented in October 2024 that the script was actively being developed, but that "it could be five years, it could be twelve months" until a script was completed. In February 2026, David Leslie Johnson-McGoldrick and Alexandre Aja were hired to write the script. In June 2026, it was announced that Þórður Pálsson would be directing the film. Principal photography is expected to begin in 2027.

=== Animated series ===
In February 2026, it was reported by Dread Central that Blumhouse Productions and Atomic Monster, the production companies behind the film adaptation, were searching for writers for an animated television series based on the franchise.

== See also ==
- List of horror video games
- Evil Dead: The Game
- Friday the 13th: The Game
- Ghostbusters: Spirits Unleashed
- Halloween: The Game
- Hellraiser: Revival
- Identity V
- Killer Klowns from Outer Space: The Game
- Predator: Hunting Grounds
- Propnight
- Resident Evil: Resistance
- The Texas Chain Saw Massacre
