= David King (Dead by Daylight) =

- Dead by Daylight character
- David's base character model
- First game: A Lullaby for the Dark (2017)
- Created by: Behaviour Interactive
- Voiced by: Stefan Horvath

In-universe information
- Origin: Manchester, England

David King is a character in Dead by Daylight, an asymmetric multiplayer survival horror online game developed by Behaviour Interactive. He was first introduced as a Survivor (Note: Playable characters in the game are categorised as either Survivors or Killers, both capitalised.) in the game's fifth downloadable content (DLC) chapter, A Lullaby for the Dark, in July 2017. David is an Englishman from Manchester who displayed anti-social behaviour before being taken to the Entity's realm, where he now possesses abilities which make him notably skilled at protecting other Survivors and bolstering their chances of survival against Killers, rewarding the player for choosing an altruistic style of play.

A downloadable update released in April 2022 revealed that David is gay, retroactively establishing him as the first confirmed LGBT character in Dead by Daylight. According to the game's creators, this decision was made to change and improve the game's lack of LGBT representation. The revelation of his sexuality was met with varied reactions. Nevertheless, he is one of the most popular characters among Dead by Daylight players and is consistently one of the most frequently chosen Survivors.

== Appearances ==
David was first revealed as a new Survivor on 25 July 2017, to be added into the game as part of the free DLC A Lullaby for the Dark, which also included the Huntress as a new Killer and Mother's Dwelling as a new map. The DLC chapter was released for computers a few days later on July 27, with confirmation that it would also be available on consoles at a later date.

Born and raised in Manchester, David is described as the spoiled only child of wealthy parents who spent his time indulging in delinquent behaviour such as drinking and fighting in pubs. He occasionally made his own money as a bare-knuckle boxer and violent debt collector, but took on these jobs for the thrill of violence more than the money as his parents' wealth allowing him to live comfortably. He was on track to become a successful rugby player, but his career was cut short when he earned a lifetime ban after assaulting a referee. His past is expanded with the 11th Tome of the game's Archives, Devotion, which explores his memories from before he was taken by the Entity. One such memory occurs in a pub, where a conversation about romantic relationships leads David to discuss intimate details about his life, including a past boyfriend.

As with every Survivor in Dead by Daylight, David has three unique perks that can also be unlocked for other Survivors to use:

- Dead Hard can only be used when injured and sprinting, and originally allowed players to lunge out of the way to evade a hit from the Killer that would otherwise put them into the dying state. Once used, the perk has a cooldown before it can be used again. It has proven to be one of the most popular perks with players throughout the game. The perk was reworked in August 2022; it now allows the injured player to take an extra hit without being put into the dying state when activated, but they will suffer from the Deep Wound effect, which requires them to be mended within a certain amount of time or they will automatically enter the dying state.
- We're Gonna Live Forever originally allowed the player to gain a token every time they blinded or stunned the Killer, unhooked a Survivor safely, or took a hit from the Killer to protect a Survivor. For each token gained, the amount of Bloodpoints the player received at the end of the match increased by 25%. The perk was also reworked in August 2022, with all of its original features replaced by the sole feature of doubling the speed at which David heals Survivors who are in the dying state.
- No Mither forces the player to play the entire match in the injured state, unable to be fully healed; in exchange, they do not leave trails of blood, their grunts of pain are quieter, their recovery speed from the dying state is increased, and they can recover from the dying state without the help of another Survivor.

== Creation and character development ==
With regards to the discrepancy between his outwardly loutish or ill-mannered presentation and his altruistic supportive abilities, Behaviour Interactive staff member Mathieu Cote explained to Rock Paper Shotgun that David's abilities reflect the company's attempts to "add something or tweak the way" that people play and the strategies they have developed. This was a departure from their usual approach of matching perks that highlight the in-universe personalities of Survivors. As with other Survivors, David does not speak but can grunt and scream in pain; in these instances, he is voiced by Slovak game designer Stefan Horvath, who worked on Dead by Daylight.

Dead by Daylight is noted for its popularity with LGBTQ gamers, and many content creators who identify as LGBTQ have been supported by the game's developers. Dead by Daylight creative director Dave Richard noted that players from the LGBTQ community have repeatedly highlighted the lack of LGBTQ narratives within the game's lore, while heterosexual relationships have been repeatedly referenced. This prompted the developers to look for ways to rectify that omission. On 27 April 2022, David's sexual orientation was confirmed through the announcement of an impending story update titled Devotion, which explains that his delinquent behaviour originated from his internal struggle to come to terms with being gay.

In a press release, the developers indicated that they wanted to bring "inclusivity and representation to life in a meaningful way" within the game's lore storytelling. With the expansion of David's backstory to explore his identity as a gay man, the developers consulted with GaymerX, an organization dedicated to provide advice on best practices for the integration of LGBTQIA2+ themes into in-game content in an attempt to avoid a tokenistic portrayal of David's characterization or give undue emphasis on negative tropes about gay men.

In an interview with Eurogamer, Richard explained that the team originally intended to leave the game's characters "open to interpretation" and refrain from exploring their relationships or sexuality, but they have since come to an understanding that "relationships are such an important part of narratives for characters" and acknowledged their prior creative stance as a mistake. To implement this new creative direction, the team identified the Archive as the platform in Dead by Daylight which allows the creative team go in-depth into the game's narrative, as opposed to a new story content chapter where they would focus more on the horror and why the Survivor had been taken by the Entity, the game's overarching antagonistic force.

With regards to the decision to establish David as a gay man years after his original introduction, Richard admitted that the Archive allows the team "to do it faster, and in the right way". The team decided on David as his character makes the most sense within the context of the Archive flashback, as opposed to any potential shock value behind a typically masculine-presenting character coming out as gay. From Richard's perspective, David is "a great fit to tell an amazing story" as he is a beloved character with the Dead of Daylight fanbase, and that he has already appeared in fan fiction works which fantasize about him as a gay character.

== Promotion and reception ==
In February 2018, as part of the Howling Grounds event celebrating the Chinese New Year, players could unlock a special outfit for David. The Archive Tome V event, which commemorated Halloween 2020, offered the "Ruffian" outfit for David, which is available exclusively in the Rift. In November 2020, David appeared in the cinematic trailer of the A Binding of Kin DLC, which introduced Élodie Rakoto as a Survivor and the Twins as a new Killer.

Ed Nightingale from Eurogamer observed that, up until the revelation of David's sexuality, there was visible anticipation among segments of the player base for an openly LGBT+ character in the game to reflect them, and that David himself had long been a fan favourite who is often interpreted as a non-heterosexual character. TJ Denzer from Shacknews observed that the sudden revelation of David as the game's first openly gay character may be "jarring to some that have been playing the game for a long time" but opined that many others will either accept it as a "welcome surprise" or remain indifferent.

In an in-depth discussion of the player feedback to the revelation of David's sexual orientation, Tyler Wilde from PC Gamer noted that "opinions are all over the place". Wilde reported that many responded positively to the increased representation, with some lauding the developers for not choosing to commercially exploit the moment "as an opportunity to sell inclusion" by expanding backstory of an existing character rather than introducing a DLC character. On the other hand, Wilde said some players expressed discontent with the announcement concerning a character perceived by some as an archetypal British chav, with opinions ranging from "tacky, pandering, or didn't go far enough". Wilde claimed that a number of "negative or confused reactions" came from individuals who were unaware that the announcement coincided with a new story expansion for the character and assumed that the developers consulted with GaymerX just to write a blog post which states his sexual identity. Lastly, Wilde characterised the remainder of the negative backlash to be homophobia from "people and pundits who reject not just the idea of representation, but the identities being represented themselves, and took the announcement as a cue for outraged soapboxing".
