= Finka =

Finka may refer to:

- Božidar Finka (1925 – 1999), Croatian linguist and lexicographer
- Finka, a diminutive of Josephine in Croatian
- Finka (potato), early-ripening variety of potato
- Finka, a Zpetsnaz operator in Tom Clancy's Rainbow Six Siege video game
- Informal synonym for "Finnish knife" in Russia:
  - NR-40 knife
  - Puukko knife

== See also ==
- Finca
