= Hooked on You: A Dead by Daylight Dating Sim =

2022 video game

- Developer: Psyop
- Publisher: Behaviour Interactive
- Series: Dead by Daylight
- Platform: Windows
- Release: August 3, 2022
- Genre: Dating sim
- Mode: Single-player

Hooked on You: A Dead by Daylight Dating Sim is a dating sim developed by Psyop and published by Behaviour Interactive. It is a parodic game where players can date the antagonists of Dead by Daylight. The game received mixed reviews from critics.

== Gameplay ==
Players arrive unexpectedly on an island inhabited by four serial killers from the video game Dead by Daylight. Players can romance any of the killers while learning their backstory. If they attempt to romance more than one killer at a time or choose dialogue options that annoy a killer, they are killed and lose the game. Minigames can also impress the killers. After completing the game, players can skip through dialogue to choose different paths.

== Development and release ==
In 2021, Behaviour Interactive held a survey regarding Dead by Daylight, with one of the questions asked of the fans was about what type of genre they would like the company to explore in the future featuring Dead by Daylight's characters; one of the possible options was a dating sim. On February 22, 2022, it was reported that on February 16, Behaviour Interactive had filed a trademark for a project titled Hooked on You: A Dead by Daylight Dating Sim. The description for the trademark states that it covers video games, as well as comic books and graphic novels.

Hooked on You was announced with a teaser trailer during Dead by Daylight's 6th anniversary livestream, hosted by Behaviour Interactive, on May 17, 2022. The trailer revealed a cartoon art style as well as the four characters to be featured in the game: The Huntress, The Spirit, The Trapper, and The Wraith. It was also announced that Psyop would be developing the game. Hooked on You was released on August 3, 2022.

== Reception ==
Reception

Aggregate score
Aggregator	Score
Metacritic	72/100

Review scores
Publication	Score
NME	4/5 stars
PC Games (DE)	8/10 stars
RPGFan	65/100

Hooked on You received "mixed or average reviews", according to review aggregator Metacritic.

PC Gamer's Tyler Colp praised the game for its "magnetic" portrayal of the characters. He credited the writing with treating them "like real people", regardless of how "ridiculous and detached from their violent role in the multiplayer game" they were.

Evan Valentine, writing for ComicBook.com, gave the game a rating of 2.5 out of 5 stars. Valentine appreciated its aesthetic and artwork, stating that it was able to successfully represent "the menace of each slasher", but felt that many of the jokes told by the game's narrators were "hit-or-miss", even for fans of Dead by Daylight. He also criticised the way the game attempted to combine genres, which, in his words, frequently caused it to suffer from "an identity crisis".

GamesRadar called it "a bit tame" for lacking any nudity or erotic content to make up for what they felt were lackluster minigames. Polygon said it is "surprisingly solid", but too self-conscious about being a parody, which they found too distracting. RPGFan similarly criticized what they felt was too much of a focus of self-referential humor and said it would probably only appeal to Dead by Daylight fans. In contrast, NME said it would likely appeal to both visual novel and Dead by Daylight fans.
