= Naughty Bear =

2010 video game

- European cover art
- Developer: Artificial Mind and Movement
- Publisher: 505 Games
- Director: David Osborne
- Designer: Ashley Pannell
- Programmer: Frédéric Robichaud
- Artist: Marek Olejarz
- Writer: Ashley Pannell
- Platforms: PlayStation 3, Xbox 360, iOS
- Release: June 25, 2010 iOS; September 23, 2010
- Genre: Action-adventure
- Modes: Single-player, multiplayer

Naughty Bear is a 2010 action-adventure video game developed by Canadian studio Artificial Mind and Movement and released by Italian publisher 505 Games for the PlayStation 3, Xbox 360, and iOS. The game is set on the fictional Perfection Island in the 1980s, where sentient teddy bears live in harmony. Naughty Bear is a shabby teddy bear who is rude, which earns him disdain from other bears, and starts a vengeful rampage against them when he is shunned from a birthday party. The game received mixed reviews from critics.

== Plot ==
Set in the 1980s, Naughty Bear is the only bear on Perfection Island who is not invited to Daddles' birthday party. Naughty tries to be nice anyway and even crafts a gift for the occasion, hoping he and Daddles can become friends. When Chubby and Giggles see that Naughty has a present, they laugh at him. This makes Naughty sulk back to his house. He then decides to get revenge on the bears, going on a killing spree and punishing the various other inhabitants of Perfection Island and any outside help that comes to their aid. His actions are influenced and commented on by an unseen British narrator with a demeanor reminiscent of a children's television show host.

The episodes that follow have Naughty deal with a variety of unusual events, such as fighting ninja bears to take out Mayor Chubby whose re-electoral promise is to kill Naughty, battling the military to punish Cozy for using birds to spy on Naughty, killing Nibbles for raising the Un-Ted, fighting his way through the Bear Emergency Action Response (BEAR) unit to kill oil baron Trembles for intending to kill Naughty and build an oil rig over his hut, and executing Fluffy and destroying his robot bear army for unknowingly threatening all existence.

In the seventh episode, a bear named Sunbeam makes contact with aliens, resulting in the aliens enslaving the bears and taking over the island. After killing the aliens and Sunbeam, Naughty is congratulated by the other bears for his effort, and is even offered a cake. However, it is actually a prank, and Daddles smashes the cake in Naughty's face, humiliating him. Heartbroken, Naughty kills all the bears by blowing up the hut they are in with an RPG before going back to his hut.

Three additional episodes were released as DLC. In the first, Naughty is invited to a cake tasting party to be the guest of honor. It is discovered to be a trap by Cop Gordon, who calls in the superhero Danger Bear and his X-Bear team to kill Naughty. In the second, Naughty punishes the crew of Captain Bear Beard and Giggles when they intend to dig up Naughty Bear's house for buried treasure. In the last one, Naughty learns the bears enlisted the vampire bear Vampiricorn to do their dirty work. Due to Vampiricorn and his minions draining the stuffing of Unibear, the vampire bears are almost unstoppable as Naughty punishes both them and Stardust, who came up with the plan in the first place.

== Gameplay ==
Gameplay requires the player to lead the single-minded and sociopathic Naughty Bear on his personal quest to bring about violent revenge against his elitist teddy bear neighbors. Naughty Bear starts each level with a handful of weapons, a time limit and the goal of racking up as many "naughty points" as possible through the massacring of the local population. Points can be gained for both volume and creativity of the kills. Larger amounts of points can be gained through the fear-based multiplier system. Multipliers are earned through any act of "naughtiness", such as vandalism, having others witness executions, or engaging in episodes of extended physical or psychological torture.

== Reception ==
Reception

Aggregate score
Aggregator	Score		
Aggregator	iOS	PS3	Xbox 360
Metacritic	54/100	43/100	43/100

Review scores
Publication	Score		
Publication	iOS	PS3	Xbox 360
Destructoid	N/A	N/A	5/10
Eurogamer	N/A	N/A	4/10
GamePro	2.5/5	N/A	N/A
GameRevolution	N/A	N/A	D+
GameSpot	N/A	5.5/10	5.5/10
GameTrailers	N/A	N/A	5.1/10
GameZone	N/A	4/10	4/10
IGN	4.5/10	3/10	3/10
Joystiq	N/A	N/A	2/5
Official Xbox Magazine (US)	N/A	N/A	7/10
PlayStation: The Official Magazine	N/A	1.5/5	N/A
The Daily Telegraph	N/A	N/A	3/10
The Escapist	N/A	2/5	N/A

The iOS version received "mixed or average" reviews, while the PlayStation 3 and Xbox 360 versions received "generally unfavorable reviews", according to video game review aggregator Metacritic.

The A.V. Club gave the Xbox 360 version a C−, saying, "Watching a psychologically tortured teddy bear blow his brains out is somewhat less hilarious than Naughty Bear seems to think. The “toys turned evil” trope is pretty warmed-over to begin with, so for the story of an ostracized teddy tormenting his cutesy brethren to succeed, it would need to do something more imaginative than nudge the boundaries of good taste. That burst of imagination never comes, so this thin game ends up trying to coast on a surfeit of charm it doesn't possess." The Escapist gave the PS3 version a score of two stars out of five and said, "Despite quite competently capturing the feel of a slasher flick and possessing a solid sense of humor, Naughty Bear is repetitious and clunky, and constantly feels like it's working to keep you separated from the parts of the game that are genuinely fun - that is, the hunting down and murder of adorable stuffed animals."

Common Sense Media also gave the game two stars out of five, saying that it "just doesn't feel quite finished. The controls are horribly dizzying, and bad camera angles lead players to miss approaching enemies. While the premise of mixing fairy tales (which have a history of violence) with pop culture could have been compelling, this game didn't get the balance right. As is, it's a game that glorifies thrill kills without much humor and storyline." The Daily Telegraph gave the Xbox 360 version a score of three out of ten and said that it was "fun for about an hour. It's not good, the virtually identical sections are hardly exciting, and there's a lot less variety in the mayhem than you might be led to believe, but it is an enjoyable, compulsive score-chaser. But it's deceptive. It lures you in with promises of something it never delivers."

== DLC and sequel ==
In May 2011, 505 Games released Naughty Bear Gold Edition — which is the original game plus all 3 of its downloadable content episodes, 3 new weapons, and 4 new multiplayer modes. In October 2012, 505 Games released Naughty Bear: Double Trouble — a compilation including the original game and its sequel Naughty Bear: Panic in Paradise.

On May 31, 2012, a sequel was announced by 505 Games. Titled Naughty Bear: Panic in Paradise, it is a download-only game and was released on October 9, 2012, for PlayStation Network and October 10 for Xbox Live Arcade. According to the Creative Director of Behaviour Interactive, Ashley Pannell, Panic in Paradise features a new gameplay style with no 'Top Hat' mode and covers thirty-six separate levels, across eleven individual locations, each with their own difficulty ramp, and the ability to purchase enhancements with in-game currency to help progress through the missions.

On May 19, 2023, Behaviour Interactive announced that Naughty Bear would be added to its game Dead by Daylight in the form of a cosmetic costume for the character of the Trapper, alongside its own Mori (special killing animation) that includes the return of the unseen narrator.
