= Phineas and Ferb: Quest for Cool Stuff =

2013 video game

- North American cover art
- Developer: Behaviour Interactive
- Publishers: NA: Majesco; EU: 505 Games
- Series: Phineas and Ferb
- Platforms: Wii; Wii U Nintendo DS; Nintendo 3DS; Xbox 360
- Release: NA: August 13, 2013; EU: March 7, 2014
- Genre: Platformer
- Mode: Single-player

Phineas and Ferb: Quest for Cool Stuff is a platform video game based on the animated television series, Phineas and Ferb. The game was developed by Behaviour Interactive, and published by Majesco under license from Disney Interactive Studios. It was released in North America for physical retail on August 12, 2013, for Wii, Wii U, Nintendo DS, Nintendo 3DS, and Xbox 360. A digital download version was made available on August 23 via Xbox Games Store for the Xbox 360, and on August 27 via Nintendo eShop for Wii U and Nintendo 3DS. The game was released in Europe on March 7, 2014, on all platforms except Xbox 360, courtesy of 505 Games.

== Gameplay ==
The game's plot and gameplay is as follows: it is the last week of summer vacation, Phineas and Ferb waste no time as they create, travel and explore in a quest to find hidden treasures to fill out their Museum of Cool. Both brothers take turns in operating the A.T.T. (All-Terrain Transformatron Vehicle) in Exploration Mode in several terrains such as their backyard, a lost temple, underwater caverns, and the surface of the Moon, looking for these treasures. Meanwhile, in the game's Action Mode, Perry the Platypus, a.k.a. Agent P, offers his assistance whilst chasing after the villainous Dr. Doofenshmirtz as he unleashes his latest obscure "-inator" devices designed to take over the entire Tri-State area.

== Reception ==
Nintendo Life gave the game an "average" rating of 5/10.
