= Deathgarden =

2018 asymmetrical multiplayer first-person shooter video game

- Developer: Behaviour Interactive
- Publisher: Behaviour Interactive
- Platforms: Microsoft Windows; PlayStation 4 Xbox One
- Release: August 14, 2018
- Genre: First-person shooter
- Mode: Multiplayer

Deathgarden was an asymmetrical multiplayer first-person shooter video game developed and published by Behaviour Interactive with gameplay similar to another of the studio's games, Dead by Daylight. It was initially launched on Steam Early Access in Summer 2018, and was later relaunched as Deathgarden: Bloodharvest in 2019. However, the same year, it ceased development and went free-to-play after failing to maintain a sufficient playerbase. The game pitted a single invincible Hunter against five Scavengers (previously called Runners) who had to try and escape. While praised by critics for its central concept and lore, it was also criticized for unbalanced gameplay caused by its asymmetrical design. On 12 August 2020, the game's servers closed.

== Plot ==
In the story of the relaunched version of the game, the Bloodharvest is the only way for the Scavengers to earn a spot in the rare, high-class Enclaves that are left after a global apocalypse.

== Gameplay ==
Each map was randomized upon the start of every round. The Scavengers had to capture control points that grant them a chance to escape, but could not kill the Hunter. The Hunter, who was the only character who got a gun, had to shoot Scavengers to knock them down and was then able to execute them. If the Hunter killed all of the Scavengers, they would win. If the Hunter did not choose to execute the Scavengers immediately, they earned bonus experience. However, a "mercy" mechanic was added later in development that allowed Runners one knockdown and respawn before they could be executed because the instant execute was still used too commonly.

== Development ==
The game suffered from a troubled early development, with the playerbase drying up only a few days after it released on Early Access. Rather than cancelling the game, the developers decided to continue developing and relaunch the game as Deathgarden: Bloodharvest.

== Reception ==
Cass Marshall of Polygon called the game "The Hunger Games combined with Judge Dredd", praising the concept of the game, but criticizing the maps as "disappointing" due to their generic nature, and calling Hunters too powerful when played by a skilled player, despite Scavengers being more fun to play.
