= Teen Titans (2005 video game) =

- Box art for the Teen Titans Game Boy Advance game.
- Developer: Artificial Mind & Movement
- Publisher: Majesco
- Designers: Jason Dozois; Dave Richard; Erik Szabo; Mario Lord
- Platform: Game Boy Advance
- Release: NA: October 11, 2005
- Genres: Action-adventure, beat 'em up
- Mode: Single-player

Teen Titans is a video game that released for the Game Boy Advance on October 16, 2005. The game is based on the television show Teen Titans. The game was going to be released in Europe shortly after its release in North America, though the European release was later cancelled.

== Summary ==
Tired of the Teen Titans defeating him, Brother Blood decides to make clones of them to do his bidding. The Teen Titans must hunt down his students and get their DNA back. The game features the five main characters from the show as playable characters, including: Robin, Raven, Beast Boy, Starfire, and Cyborg. The game's boss characters are Gizmo, Jinx, Mammoth, and Brother Blood.

== Reception ==
Teen Titans

Aggregate scores
| Aggregator | Score |
|---|---|
| GameRankings | 60.30% |
| Metacritic | 61/100 |

Review scores
| Publication | Score |
|---|---|
| IGN | 5.5/10 |
| Nintendo Power | 6/10 |

The game was met with mixed reception upon release; GameRankings gave it a score of 60.30%, while Metacritic gave it 61 out of 100.

== Sequel ==
Teen Titans 2
- Developers: Artificial Mind and Movement
- Publisher: Majesco
- Designer: Erik Szabo
- Platform: Game Boy Advance
- Release: NA: October 23, 2006
- Genres: Action-adventure, beat em up
- Mode: Single-player

Teen Titans 2

Aggregate scores
| Aggregator | Score |
|---|---|
| GameRankings | 62.50% |
| Metacritic | 45/100 |

Review score
| Publication | Score |
|---|---|
| IGN | 5/10 |

A sequel, Teen Titans 2: The Brotherhood's Revenge, often shortened to simply Teen Titans 2, was released exclusively in North America for the Game Boy Advance on October 23, 2006. The sequel was met with mixed to negative reception, as GameRankings gave it a score of 62.50%, while Metacritic gave it 45 out of 100.

== See also ==
- Teen Titans (2006 video game)
