= The Casting of Frank Stone =

2024 video game

- Developer: Supermassive Games
- Publisher: Behaviour Interactive
- Director: Paul Martin
- Designer: Dave Grove
- Programmer: Tim Green
- Artist: Ollie Simmonds
- Writers: Steve Goss; Paul Martin; Graham Reznick
- Composers: Boxed Ape (Alistair Kerley & Frankie Harper)
- Engine: Unreal Engine 5
- Platforms: PlayStation 5; Windows; Xbox Series X/S
- Release: 3 September 2024
- Genres: Survival horror, interactive drama
- Mode: Single-player

The Casting of Frank Stone is a 2024 interactive drama horror game developed by Supermassive Games and published by Behaviour Interactive. The game is set in the Dead by Daylight universe and was released for PlayStation 5, Windows, and Xbox Series X/S on 3 September 2024. It received mixed reviews from critics.

== Gameplay ==
The Casting of Frank Stone is set during the summer of 1980 in the town of Cedar Hills, Oregon, and involves four young aspiring filmmakers who want to make a horror movie in a condemned steel mill. Similar to previous Supermassive Games releases, the game includes a branching narrative, environmental puzzles, and quick time events (QTEs). Behaviour Interactive's Senior Copywriting Team Lead, Justin Fragapane adds "every decision you make pens the script – and may be the only thing standing between life and death for this group of young friends". Players also have to gather clues to learn more about Cedar Hills and the mysteries of the titular Frank Stone.

== Synopsis ==
=== Setting and characters ===
The Casting of Frank Stone is a narrative expansion of the Dead by Daylight universe, spanning three divergent timelines. These events are orchestrated by a cosmic, malevolent being known as the Entity, which feeds on the strong emotions of victims trapped in endless trials. The story begins in 1963 in the town of Cedar Hills, Oregon, where police officer Sam Green confronts serial killer Frank Stone at a local steel mill. In 1980, the abandoned mill is explored by a group of teenage filmmakers—Linda, Jaime, and Chris—along with Jaime's sister, Bonnie, and Sam's son, Robert. The 2024 timeline shifts to an English manor owned by wealthy cultist Augustine Lieber. She invites Madison (Bonnie's daughter), an older Linda, and a man named Stan to her estate, which secretly houses a massive time machine called the Horologium that allows characters and artefacts to bridge these parallel realities.

=== Plot ===
In 1963, Sam thwarts Frank from sacrificing an infant at the steel mill, shooting him dead. In 1980, Linda, Jaime, Chris, Bonnie, and Robert sneak into the mill to shoot their amateur horror film, Murder Mill. Using a mysterious camera purchased from an enigmatic shopkeeper, Chris captures paranormal energy that summons Frank's undead spirit. Chris is suddenly pulled into a portal, while Frank hunts the remaining crew. Sam arrives and helps the survivors trap Frank's spirit within the camera's film. To prevent his return, they divide the film reels amongst themselves.

In 2024, Madison, Linda, and Stan arrive at Augustine's manor to sell their respective pieces of the Murder Mill film. Exploring the estate, they discover grim artefacts, the Horologium, and a younger Sam, who has inexplicably arrived from an alternate timeline to stop the sale. Chris then emerges from the Horologium, having time-travelled from 1980. The group watches a compiled cut of Murder Mill but soon realise the events depicted do not match their own memories, revealing they have been pulled together from divergent timelines.

It is revealed that Augustine is worshipping the Entity. After Sam thwarted her original attempt to summon the Entity in 1963 using Frank's murders, Augustine used the Horologium to gather alternate versions of the Murder Mill film from different timelines, aiming to piece together Frank's essence and resurrect him. With the cursed film now complete, Frank emerges from the projection screen as a monstrous being and attacks the group. Augustine attempts to offer the survivors to the Entity in exchange for forbidden knowledge, but Frank kills her instead, allowing the Entity to claim her. The surviving characters are transported to a solitary campfire within the Entity's realm, while Frank awaits his new role as a killer in the Entity's endless trials.

== Development and release ==
Behaviour Interactive announced in May 2023 that Supermassive Games was developing a single-player game set in the Dead by Daylight universe. The Casting of Frank Stone was officially revealed at the 2023 Game Awards where a teaser trailer for the game was shown.

Behaviour's head of partnerships Mathieu Cote said a single player narrative game in the Dead by Daylight universe was something the studio had always wanted to do at some point, but they did not have the single player experience, leading to the team looking elsewhere, with Supermassive being the first team they reached out to. Supermassive Games' Steve Goss said the game will be familiar if players have played some of the studio's previous single player narrative games, but there is also "huge sections of the game that feel nothing like a traditional Supermassive game" because of the connection to the Dead by Daylight experience, with Goss adding that there is a balance between the two things.

The Casting of Frank Stone was released for PlayStation 5, Windows and Xbox Series X/S on 3 September 2024.

== Reception ==
Reception

Aggregate scores
Aggregator	Score
Metacritic	(PC) 71/100 (PS5) 69/100
OpenCritic	38% recommend

Review scores
Publication	Score
Digital Trends	3/5
Eurogamer	3/5
Game Informer	5.5/10
GameSpot	6/10
Hardcore Gamer	3/5
IGN	5/10
NME	2/5
PCGamesN	7/10
Push Square	5/10
Shacknews	7/10
VG247	4/5

The Casting of Frank Stone received "mixed or average" reviews from critics, according to review aggregator website Metacritic. Fellow review aggregator OpenCritic assessed that the game received fair approval, being recommended by 38% of critics.
