= Teen Titans (2006 video game) =

- North American box art
- Developer: Artificial Mind and Movement
- Publishers: THQ; Majesco
- Designers: Shane Keller; Flint Dille; John Zuur Platten
- Composer: Mark Mitchell
- Engine: Havok (software)
- Platforms: GameCube, PlayStation 2, Xbox
- Release: NA: May 24, 2006; PAL: October 11, 2006; NA: October 13, 2006 (Xbox)
- Genres: Action, beat 'em up
- Modes: Single-player, multiplayer

Teen Titans is a 2006 action beat 'em up video game released for the GameCube, PlayStation 2, and Xbox. A game under the same name was released for the Game Boy Advance on October 16, 2005. They were developed by Artificial Mind and Movement and published by THQ in conjunction with Majesco. The game is themed after the 2003 Cartoon Network TV series Teen Titans, and most of the original voice actors reprise their respective roles.

The game was met with mixed reception from critics. While reviewers generally praised the game for being true to the show, many found its gameplay boring and repetitive.

== Gameplay ==
Teen Titans features cooperative gameplay for up to four players, and players can switch to a different hero at will.

Teen Titans is an action beat 'em up video game, themed after the 2003 Cartoon Network TV series Teen Titans. It is played from an overhead perspective and up to four players can play either cooperatively or in a competitive mode. It features the titular Teen Titans (Robin, Raven, Cyborg, Starfire, and Beast Boy) as playable characters in story mode. Players are able to switch between any of the five Titans in real time, each with unique fighting abilities. Each character has unique strengths and abilities. Robin, the most agile, has a double jump and uses punches, kicks, and his staff. Raven's attacks largely center around telekinesis. Cyborg is best suited for close-range attacks, while Starfire is better suited for distanced attacks. Beast Boy can transform into various creatures, some of which have unique attacks.

As players progress they unlock new fighting combos for each Titan, allowing for more diverse movesets. Environmental objects such as barrels can be thrown as projectiles. In the game's competitive mode, dubbed Master of Games, players can fight against each other in a versus battle. It features 31 unlockable characters, which are found throughout the game's campaign. Many of the characters from the animated series appear within the game, all of whom (with the exception of Mad Mod) retain their voice actors from the show.

== Plot ==
The Teen Titans receive a video game in the mail, one that is starring them. When Cyborg and Beast Boy try to play it, they all get placed inside of the video game's world. They go through various levels as they try to figure out how to return home, fighting against several enemies and villains they have faced off against before. After the Titans defeat most of the villains, Slade appears before them, making Robin suspect that he was behind everything, but Slade, too, is part of the program. The Master of Games then reveals himself as the mastermind, but after the Titans capture him, they find that he is not the true culprit. Breaking the fourth wall, the Titans reveal that the player is behind everything.

== Development and marketing ==
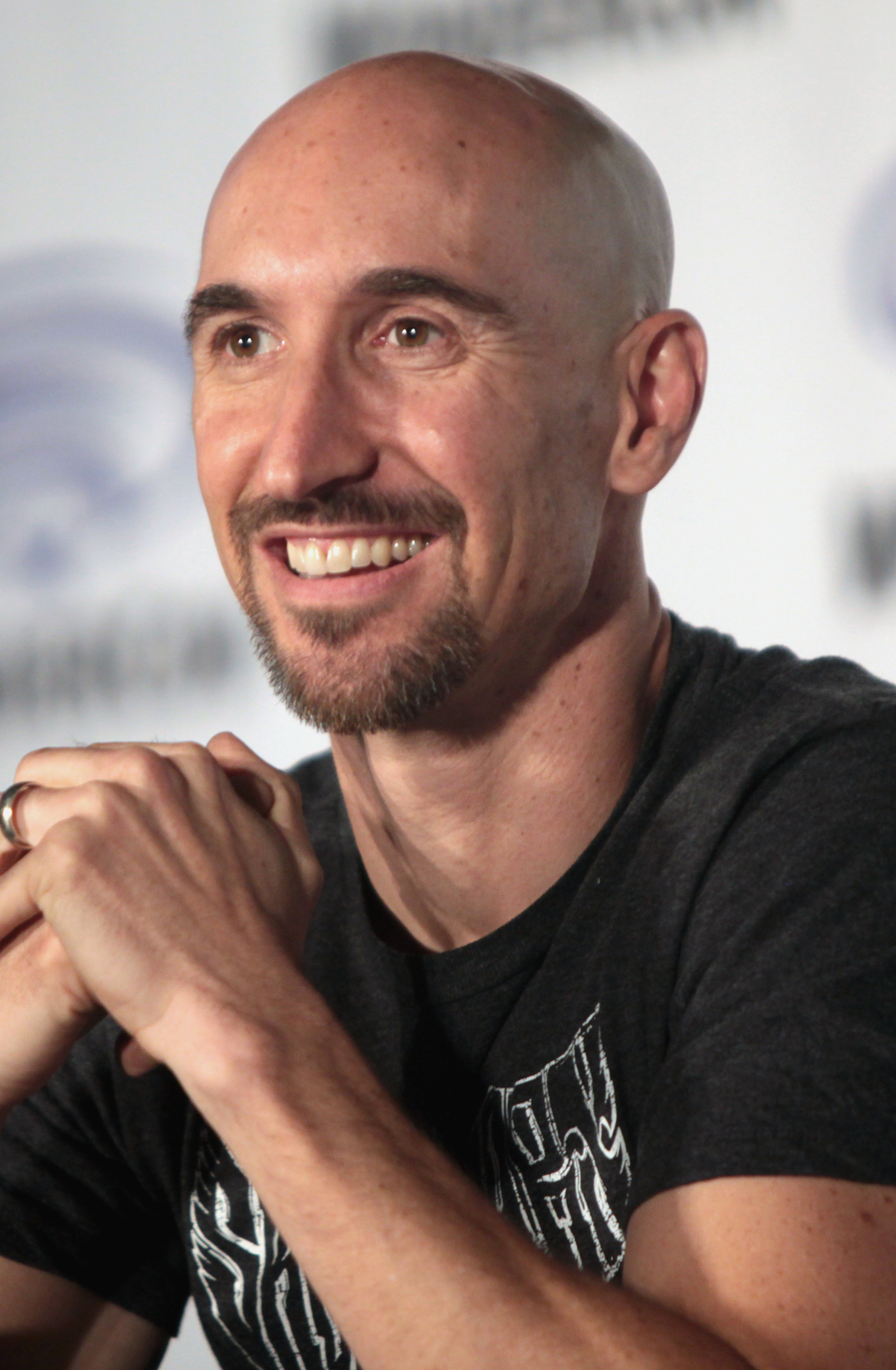
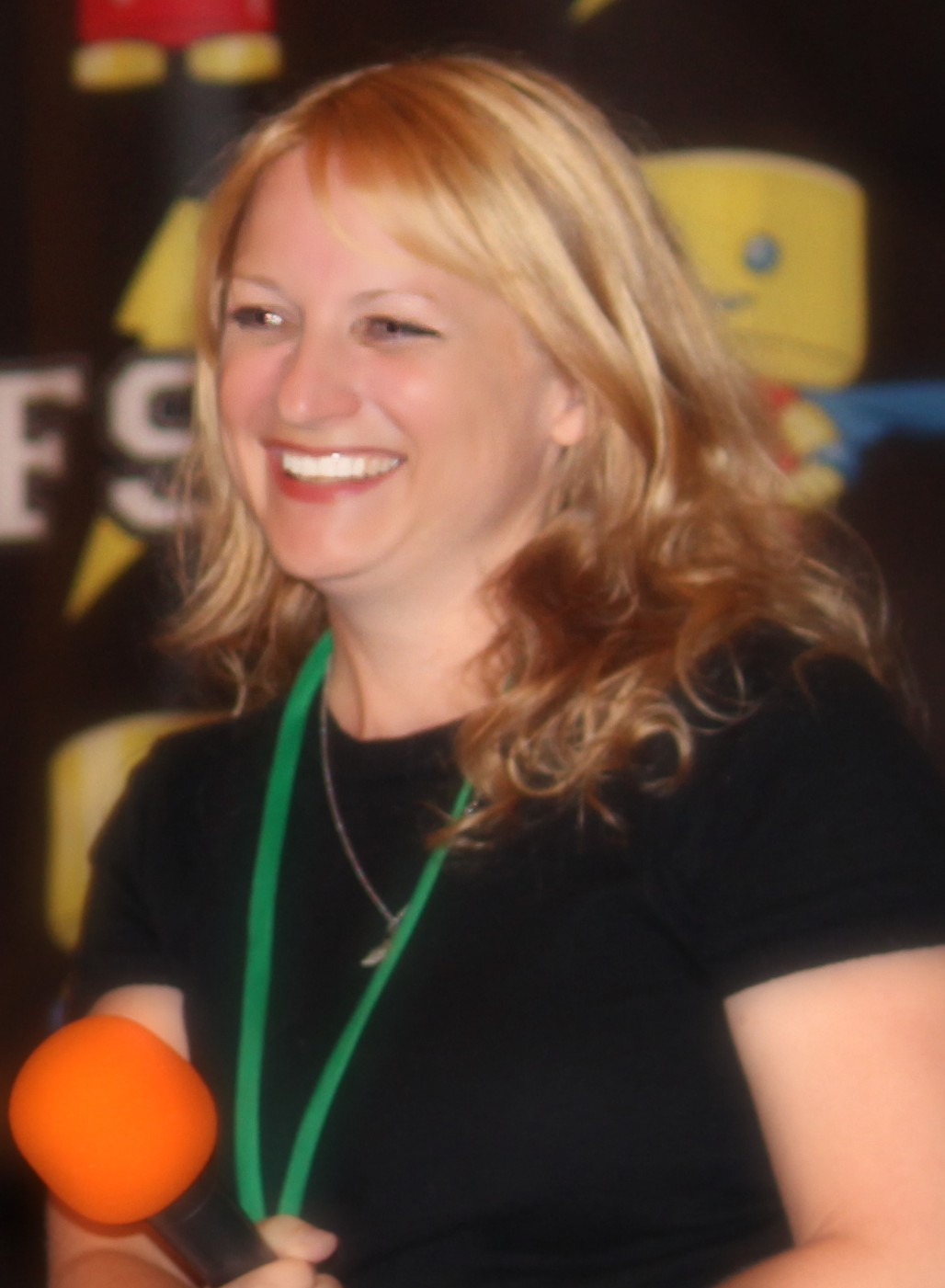
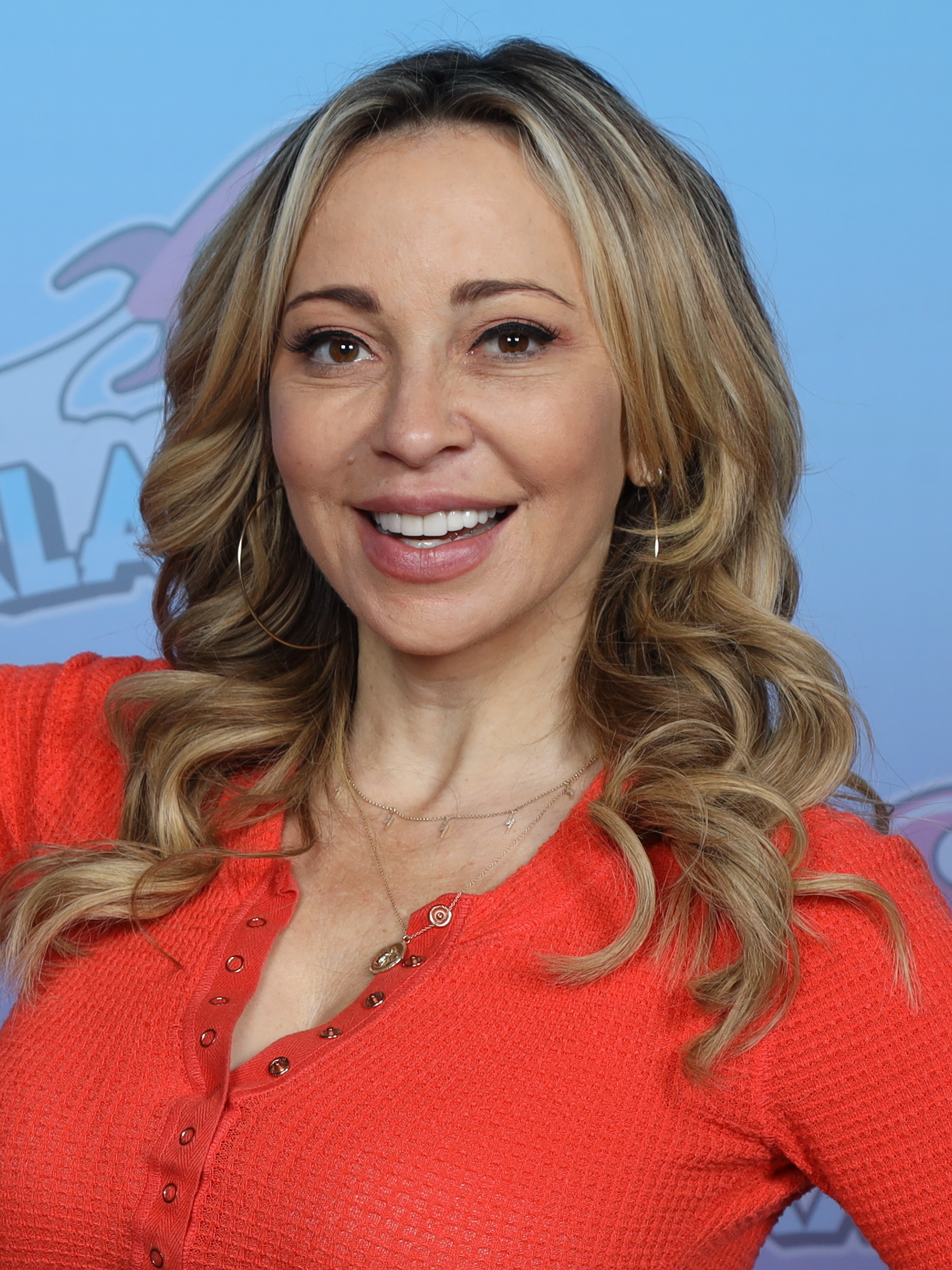
Many actors from the show reprise their roles, including Scott Menville as Robin, Hynden Walch as Starfire, and Tara Strong as Raven.

Teen Titans was unveiled in April 2005, shortly before the Electronics Entertainment Expo (E3) that year. A game under the same name was released for the Game Boy Advance on October 16 the same year. The console version was released initially in North America for GameCube and PlayStation 2 on May 24, 2006. It was released in the PAL region on October 11, and a North American Xbox released followed two days later on October 13.

Teen Titans was released at a lower list price game. It sold for 20 dollars in North America. It was designed to coincide with the 2003 Cartoon Network show Teen Titans. Many of the game's voice actors, 18 in total, reprise their roles from the TV series. This includes Scott Menville as Robin, Hynden Walch as Starfire, Tara Strong as Raven, Greg Cipes as Beast Boy, and Khary Payton as Cyborg. The game makes use of Havok for its physics simulations such as destructables.

The Xbox version of the game came out very late in the console's lifespan and as a result, this version became one of the most expensive and rarest games on the platform.

== Reception ==
Reception

Aggregate scores
Aggregator	Score
GameRankings	(GC) 74.37% (Xbox) 66.38% (PS2) 61.22%
Metacritic	(GC) 63/100 (Xbox) 63/100 (PS2) 64/100

Review scores
Publication	Score
GameSpot	6.6/10
GamesRadar+	3.5/5
IGN	7.2/10
Nintendo Power	7.8/10
Official U.S. PlayStation Magazine	3.5/5
Official Xbox Magazine (US)	7.6/10
X-Play	3/5

The game received generally mixed reviews. Aggregation websites GameRankings and Metacritic report scores of 74.37% and 73 out of 100 for the GameCube version, 66.38% and 63 out of 100 for the Xbox version, and 61.22% and 64 out of 100 for the PlayStation 2 version, respectively.

Comparisons were made to other cooperative action games from the era. The reviewer from Nintendo Power said that "the play is responsive and the graphics are excellent--but it deserves to be more than a Teenage Mutant Ninja Turtles (TMNT) clone". D.F. Smith of G4TV's show X-Play compared it to X-Men Legends, which he commented was superior to Teen Titans. He said that X-Men Legends had a "diverse cast of heroes, so it's deeper and more replayable". Several reviewers noted that the game did not have much in the way of depth. The reviewer from PlayStation Official Magazine – UK lambasted the game, saying that "a decent cartoon feel isn't nearly enough to redeem this hollow, tedious experience". The reviewer from Official Xbox Magazine was forgiving of the game considering its price. He commented that "any $20 game that lets you butt-stomp bad guys as a neon-green elephant earns props from me". Edward Gordon of GameShark noted that while the game was a budget title it was likely to only appeal to the fanbase.

Critics generally praised the game for being true to its parent cartoon. The graphics and animation were points of high regard from Greg Mueller of GameSpot, was cited Beast Boy's transformations as an example. X-Play's D.F. Smith noted that the world looked detailed, and that the game makes good use of Havok physics. Cameron Lewis felt that the game was a faithful representation of the show in his review for GamesRadar. In a contrasting opinion from Play Magazine, the reviewer criticized the visuals, noting that there was "no sign of the WB animation".
