= Exterminauts =

Upcoming cooperative third-person shooter

- Developer: Behaviour Interactive
- Publisher: Level Infinite
- Engine: Unreal Engine 5
- Platforms: PlayStation 5, Xbox Series X and Series S, Windows
- Release: 2027
- Genre: Third-person shooter
- Mode: Multiplayer

Exterminauts is an upcoming cooperative third-person player versus environment (PvE) shooter developed by Behaviour Interactive and published by Level Infinite in partnership with Team Shooter & Creative. Set in a science-fiction universe, the game features three-player cooperative gameplay centered on completing contracts on the alien planet Tian.

Exterminauts is scheduled to launch in 2027 for PlayStation 5, Xbox Series X and Series S, and Windows.

== Gameplay ==
Exterminauts is a cooperative third-person PvE shooter designed for teams of one to three players. Players assume the role of Exterminauts, blue-collar galactic workers who undertake contracts on Tian. Missions involve exterminating alien pests, repairing infrastructure, completing other objectives, and extracting from hazardous worksites.

Combat centers on specialized firearms inspired by industrial power tools, including weapons that use ice, electricity, anti-gravity, and foam. Players can perform actions such as sliding, shooting while sliding, rolling, and traversing environments using ziplines, as well as use special Overdrive abilities. Completing contracts rewards players with resources that can be used to improve equipment and upgrade tools for subsequent missions.

The game's environments combine industrial structures and machinery with Tian's alien ecosystem. Players encounter a variety of alien pests with different abilities and weaknesses, requiring them to adapt their equipment and cooperate with other players during missions.

== Development and release ==
Exterminauts is being developed by Canadian video game developer Behaviour Interactive and published by Level Infinite in partnership with Team Shooter & Creative. The game is being developed using Unreal Engine 5.

Exterminauts was announced at Gamescom Opening Night Live in August 2026. Additional gameplay footage was shown during Xbox @ gamescom 2026 and the Future Games Show at gamescom 2026 later that week. The game is scheduled for release in 2027 for Windows, PlayStation 5, and Xbox Series X/S.
