= Jersey Devil (video game) =

1997 video game

- North American cover art
- Developer: Megatoon Studios (Note: Megatoon was renamed Behaviour Interactive after a merger with Multimedia Interactive; this name change is reflected on the later North American release.) (Note: The PAL cover credits the developer as Malofilm Interactive.)
- Publishers: PlayStation: PAL: Ocean Software; NA: SCEA; Windows; Infogrames
- Designer: Claude Pelletier
- Programmer: Stéphane Leblanc
- Composer: Gilles Léveillé
- Platforms: PlayStation, Windows
- Release: PlayStation: PAL: December 12, 1997; NA: June 16, 1998; Windows; 1999
- Genre: 3D platformer
- Mode: Single-player

Jersey Devil is a 1997 3D platformer developed by Behaviour Interactive and released worldwide for the PlayStation and Windows. The titular protagonist is a Jersey Devil, although he has more characteristics of a bat. His primary mission is to stop Dr. Knarf and his army of mutated vegetables and prehistoric monsters. Jersey Devil uses his punch, jumping, and gliding abilities to defeat his enemies. In many areas of the game, it is necessary to collect all five letters of Knarf's name to proceed.

== Gameplay ==
Jersey Devil is a platform game set in a 3D world, with gameplay dominated by collecting icons and defeating enemies. The player character's abilities include tail whipping enemies and gliding in order to get out of fatal falls or reach new areas.

== Plot ==
Dennis, a mutated, humanoid pumpkin, enters Dr. Knarf's lab with something he found in a small cage. He interrupts Knarf as he is about to dissect a mutant eggplant in order to show him the creature he had found. In the cage is shown to be the main character, Jersey Devil, as an infant. Knarf begins plans to dissect the infant in order to study him, but realizes that when Dennis interrupted him earlier, he ruined his last scalpel blade and locks Dennis in a cage outside before leaving to fetch more. While gone, one of his plant monsters tries to attack the infant Jersey Devil, but he eludes it and then begins to wreck the lab while Dennis watches helplessly from his cage. Knarf returns to find his lab in ruins with the Jersey Devil holding a bottle of Nitroglycerin, which he dangles in the air before suddenly dropping it and destroying the lab almost completely, the result of which sends him flying far away into the middle of the nearby town of "Jersey".

The cutscene then flashes forward to many years later, the town has grown into a city, and mutant vegetable monsters are seen chasing, terrorizing and kidnapping the residents of the city. One of them stops while passing by a television store window, which is playing the evening news, and watches curiously as Dr. Knarf is mentioned. The news then goes on to mention "mysterious sightings of the legendary Jersey Devil", as a figure suddenly appears behind the mutant and pulls off the mask he is wearing, revealing him to be Dennis. The figure, revealed to be Jersey Devil, leans down and says "Boo!" scaring Dennis away, when he picked up by Knarf as he drives past in his car. The scene then pans back towards Jersey Devil, finding instead only empty streets, before revealing Jersey Devil up on the rooftops, looking down over the city as the title screen appears.

== Development ==
Sony Computer Entertainment America picked up the title in October 1997.

== Reception ==
Reception

Aggregate score
Aggregator	Score
GameRankings	59%

Review scores
Publication	Score
Consoles +	89%
Electronic Gaming Monthly	6/10 (Note: In Electronic Gaming Monthly's review of the PlayStation version, one critic gave it 5/10, two others gave it each a score of 6/10, and the other gave it 7/10.)
EP Daily	6/10
Famitsu	25/40
Game Informer	6/10
GameRevolution	C+
GameSpot	5.2/10
IGN	5/10
Next Generation	3/5
Official U.S. PlayStation Magazine	2/5

The PlayStation version received mixed reviews according to the review aggregation website GameRankings. Next Generation said, "Anyone looking for something fresh for PlayStation's stale platform genre probably won't be that happy with this game." In Japan, where the game was ported and published by Konami under the name Jersey Devil no Daibōken (ジャージーデビルの大冒険, Jājī Debiru no Daibōken; lit. "The Great Adventure of the Jersey Devil") on June 24, 1999, Famitsu gave it a score of 25 out of 40. GamePro said, "Jersey Devil is definitely the PlayStation's most ambitious 3D platform games released to date, even though its camera problems keep it from attaining the gaming stratosphere. Fans of Crash or Croc should pick up this title—but be prepared for some devilishly frustrating situations." (Note: GamePro gave the PlayStation version two 4.5/5 scores for graphics and sound, 3.5/5 for control, and 4/5 for fun factor.)

Criticism was mainly focused on the camera and graphics. A common praise given to the game was its orchestral score by Gilles Léveillé.

== Footnotes ==
Notes
