= Quarantine Zone: The Last Check =

2026 video game

- Developer: Brigada Games
- Publisher: Devolver Digital
- Engine: Unreal Engine 5
- Platforms: Microsoft Windows; Xbox Series X/S
- Release: Microsoft Windows; January 12, 2026; Xbox Series X/S; July 15, 2026
- Genre: Simulation
- Mode: Single-player

Quarantine Zone: The Last Check is a simulation game developed by Brigada Games and released for Microsoft Windows on January 12, 2026, by Devolver Digital. A version for Xbox Series X/S was released on July 15, 2026. In the game, the player takes on the role of the commander of an evacuation checkpoint following the outbreak of a zombie virus pandemic. Two days after its release, the game reached third place in Steam’s current top sellers.

== Plot ==
After the outbreak of a virus infection that turns people into zombies, the military established checkpoints to evacuate the population. As the commander, the player takes charge of one of these posts and thus decides the fate of the survivors who arrive there. In addition, the player coordinates the supply of healthy individuals and the continued research into the virus.

== Gameplay ==
The core gameplay—inspecting survivors and research-related minigames—takes place from a first-person perspective, while the base is managed from an isometric view. The player earns money for inspections and certain side tasks, which is used to cover the maintenance costs of the checkpoint. The goal is to provide a government-mandated quota of survivors for evacuation after a set number of days, while simultaneously keeping the virus away from the residential area.

The concept of summoning other people for inspection and deciding their fate based on predefined criteria is comparable to Papers, Please or Contraband Police.

=== Inspection of Survivors ===
The player instructs survivors to enter the guarded examination area one at a time. There, the individuals are checked for various signs of infection listed in a handbook. To do this, the player has several diagnostic tools at their disposal, such as a reflex hammer, a scanner, or a flashlight. The symptoms are divided into different levels of severity. After the examination, the player must decide whether the survivor may proceed to the residential area, must be monitored in a secured quarantine unit, or is to be eliminated.

=== Checkpoint Management ===
With the money earned, the player can upgrade the various facilities of the checkpoint (e.g., additional sleeping quarters for survivors, improved defensive measures, or more powerful generators).

At night, the checkpoint can be attacked by zombie hordes. When this happens, the player takes control of a drone and uses its weapon systems to fend off the zombies (cf. tower defense).

== Reception ==
Reception

Aggregate scores
Aggregator	Score
Metacritic	68/100
OpenCritic	41% recommend

Review scores
Publication	Score
Eurogamer	3/5 stars
GameStar	72/100
PC Gamer (UK)	60/100
PC Games (DE)	7/10

Quarantine Zone: The Last Check received "mixed or average" reviews from critics, according to the review aggregation website Metacritic. Fellow review aggregator OpenCritic assessed that the game received fair approval, being recommended by 41% of critics. It sold over 500,000 copies in the first week of its release.

The game's quickly engaging gameplay concept was praised, as it remains motivating[6][2] through the continuous unlocking of additional tools and symptoms. Criticism was directed at its technical lack of polish: the release version reportedly still contained many graphical and gameplay bugs, and the potential of the game engine[6] was not fully utilized. Base management was also seen as underdeveloped, despite offering a wide range of possibilities. Christopher Livingston noted that some features known from the demo had been cut (for example, the player had to load a cart in the storage area and transport supplies to the living quarters, whereas this is now handled with just a few clicks in the interface).[6]
