= Behaviour Interactive =

Canadian video game development studio

Behaviour Interactive Inc.
- Formerly: Megatoon (1992–1997); Artificial Mind and Movement (2000–2010)
- Type: Private
- Industry: Video games
- Founded: September 21, 1992; 34 years ago in Quebec City, Canada
- Founder: Rémi Racine
- Headquarters: Montreal, Canada
- Area served: Worldwide
- Key people: Rémi Racine (President); Stephen Mulrooney (CTO); Wayne Meazza (EVP Studios); Roland Ribotti (CFO)
- Products: Dead by Daylight (2016); Fallout Shelter (2015)
- Number of employees: >1,200
- Divisions: Behaviour Original Games; Behaviour Services
- Subsidiaries: Behaviour Rotterdam; Behaviour UK; Midwinter Entertainment; Red Hook Studios; The Fun Pimps
- Website: bhvr.com

Behaviour Interactive Inc. (sometimes shortened to "BHVR") is a Canadian video game developer and publisher based in Montreal. The studio is best known for the online asymmetric multiplayer survival horror game Dead by Daylight (2016).

== History ==
The company was founded in 1992 in Quebec City as Megatoon. Two years later, the company's current CEO and executive producer, Rémi Racine, co-founded the Montreal-based Multimedia Interactive (MMI) to develop interactive entertainment software for CD-ROM. Both companies were sold to Malofilm Communications in 1996, and a year later, they were merged into Behaviour Interactive with Racine as general manager. In 1997, the studio released Jersey Devil on PlayStation and later Windows. The 3D platformer was the first console game made entirely in Quebec. Distributed by Sony, Jersey Devil caught the eye of Infogrames Entertainment, which approached Behaviour to produce what would become Bugs Bunny: Lost in Time, released in 1999.

In 1999, Racine and some investors bought the studio back, but they had to rename it, changing the name in 2000 to Artificial Mind and Movement Inc. (A2M). As A2M, the studio continued its work-for-hire projects, producing titles for clients including Konami, Sony Computer Entertainment, Ubisoft, Disney Interactive Studios, Nintendo, EA and Activision. In November 2008, the company acquired Santiago-based Wanako Games from Activision Blizzard, which was the first and largest South American game studio. As A2M, the studio maintained its focus on producing original titles, releasing Scaler (2004), Wet (2009) and Naughty Bear (2010). This last title had more than 800,000 console-unit sales and laid the groundwork for the studio's 2016 breakthrough original game, Dead by Daylight.

On November 8, 2010, Artificial Mind & Movement announced its name was returning to Behaviour Interactive. The change was partly due to increased production of original titles and thus stronger presence in the gaming community, partly due to the availability of the original name, and partly due to one particular obscene interpretation of the initialism "A2M".

The studio has maintained its work-for-hire services with major clients while continuing to invest in original games. In 2016, Behaviour released Dead by Daylight, a multiplayer survival action horror game published by Sweden's Starbreeze. Dead by Daylight sold more than 1 million copies in its first two months and by 2022 had more than 50 million players worldwide. In 2018, Behaviour purchased the game's publishing rights from Starbreeze for US$16 million. Thanks in large part to the game's success, Behaviour has seen its revenues grow from CAD $25 million in 2015 to CAD $225 million in 2021.

On June 21, 2018, Bethesda Softworks sued Warner Bros. Interactive Entertainment and Behaviour Interactive over Westworld, a mobile game based on the science fiction television series Westworld, alleging that the game is a "blatant rip-off" of Fallout Shelter, another mobile game, co-developed by Behaviour. In a suit filed in a United States District Court for the District of Maryland, Bethesda alleges that Westworld "has the same or highly similar game design, art style, animations, features and other gameplay elements" as Fallout Shelter. Bethesda sued for copyright infringement, breach of contract and misappropriating trade secrets, seeking a jury trial and damages. The lawsuit also alleged that Westworld identically reproduced some software bugs that were originally present in Fallout Shelter. The lawsuit was settled out of court in January 2019.

In April 2022, Behaviour announced the opening of a new office in Toronto. In May 2022, it was announced Behaviour Interactive had acquired the Seattle-based game development studio Midwinter Entertainment. In the summer of 2022, Behaviour released Hooked on You, a dating sim spinoff from the Dead by Daylight franchise, and the melee brawler Flippin Misfits. Both games were revealed alongside Meet Your Maker at the first Behaviour Beyond showcase of new and upcoming releases broadcast in August 2022.

In February 2023, it was announced that Behaviour had acquired UK-based video game developer SockMonkey Studios, which is now renamed Behaviour UK – North. In March 2023, it was announced that a film based on Dead by Daylight is in development, with Blumhouse Productions, Atomic Monster and Striker Entertainment co-producing. Behaviour's next major original release, Meet Your Maker, was released in April 2023 on PC, PlayStation 4/5, and Xbox One, Series X/S. The game was billed as a "post-apocalyptic first-person building-and-raiding game where every level is designed by players for players".

In May 2023, Concordia University in Montreal announced the creation of a new Behaviour-funded research chair in video game design in its Department of Design and Computation Arts. It was announced that Behaviour would provide $2 million in funding for the research chair over the next 10 years. In July 2023, Behaviour announced the opening of a new studio in Truro, Cornwall, called Behaviour UK – South. In August 2023, Behaviour acquired Netherlands-based video game developer Codeglue, renaming it Behaviour Rotterdam. In November 2023, it was announced that Dead by Daylight had surpassed the 60-million player milestone.

In January 2024, Behaviour laid off 45 employees from its Montreal location, which accounted for less than 3% of its total workforce. In March 2024, Behaviour announced its acquisition of Fly Studio, an award-winning multimedia experience designer and producer from Montreal. Behaviour said the acquisition was made to consolidate its position in the location-based entertainment (LBE) market. Immersive Entertainment replaced the studio's Business Solutions unit, according to its website. In April 2024, Behaviour announced it would be partnering with Scandinavian independent game developer Haenir Studio to bring their action-horror co-op survival game Blight: Survival to life. The company announced it would lay off an additional 95 employees, 70 of whom are based in Montreal.

Behaviour announced the closure of Midwinter on September 18, 2024, and the cancellation of their Dead by Daylight spinoff codenamed "Project T". Behaviour acquired Red Hook Studios, the developers of Darkest Dungeon and its sequel, in September 2024; Red Hook would continue as an independent studio under Behaviour. In March 2026, Behaviour bought The Fun Pimps, the developer of 7 Days to Die.

Behaviour Interactive made headlines as one of the first video game studios to abolish crunch time, a controversial yet widespread practice in the video game industry that requires employees to work longer hours, often unpaid, to meet project milestones. The policy helped Behaviour earn its designation as one of Canada's Best Workplaces by gamesindustry.biz in 2018 and again in 2021 and 2022.

=== Business units ===
Behaviour's operations are divided into two business units: Services and Original Games. Its Services unit provides work-for-hire development services to major video game and entertainment industry brands such as Disney, Sony, Activision, Warner Bros. Discovery, Ubisoft, HBO and Nintendo and also includes an Immersive Entertainment vertical that has a primary focus on location-based entertainment (LBE). Behaviour's Original Games unit produces the studio's original IP including Dead by Daylight.

== Games ==
=== As Megatoon Interactive ===
Game title	Year released	Platform	Publisher
Goferwinkel's Adventures: The Lavender Land	1992	PC	Ebook, Inc.
Wallobee Jack: The Bingi Burra Stone	1993	PC	Ebook, Inc.
Wallobee Jack: The Lost Lionardo	1994	PC	WordPerfect Main Street
Wallobee Jack: Secret of the Sphinx	1994	PC	WordPerfect Main Street
Wallobee Jack: The Thai Sun Adventure	1994	PC	GAGA Communications Inc. Amuse, Inc. WordPerfect Main Street.
The Temple of Monakumba: Starring Wallobee Jack	1994	PC	N/A.
Mighty Machines	1996	PC	Malofilm

=== As Artificial Mind & Movement ===
Game title	Year released	Platform	Publisher
The Grinch	2000	PS, PC, DC	Konami
Bugs Bunny & Taz: Time Busters	2000	PS, PC	Infogrames
Smurf Racer!	2001	PS	Infogrames
Monsters, Inc. Scream Team	2001	PS, PS2, PC	Sony Computer Entertainment
Ice Age	2002	GBA	Ubisoft
Scooby-Doo! Mystery Mayhem	2003	GBA, PS2, GC, Xbox	THQ
Carmen Sandiego: The Secret of the Stolen Drums	2004	PS2, GC, Xbox	BAM! Entertainment
Home on the Range	2004	GBA	Buena Vista Games
Disney's Kim Possible 2: Drakken's Demise	2004	GBA	Buena Vista Games
Scaler	2004	PS2, GC, Xbox	Take-Two Interactive
Get on da Mic	2004	PS2	Eidos Interactive
Lizzie McGuire 2: Lizzie Diaries	2004	GBA	Buena Vista Games
Disney Move	2004	PS2 EyeToy	Buena Vista Games
Scooby-Doo! Unmasked	2005	GBA, PS2, GC, Xbox, DS	THQ
Disney's Kim Possible 3: Team Possible	2005	GBA	Buena Vista Games
That's So Raven 2: Supernatural Style	2005	GBA	Buena Vista Games
everGirl... your way to play!	2005	GBA, PC	THQ
Chicken Little	2005	GBA	Buena Vista Games
Teen Titans	2005	GBA	Majesco
Ed, Edd n Eddy: The Mis-Edventures	2005	GBA, PC, PS2, GC, Xbox	Midway Games
Flow: Urban Dance Uprising	2005	PS2	Ubisoft
Disney's Kim Possible: Kimmunicator	2005	DS	Buena Vista Games
Teen Titans	2006	PS2, GC, Xbox	THQ, Majesco
Monster House	2006	PS2, GC, GBA, DS	THQ
The Ant Bully	2006	Wii, PS2, GC, GBA, PC	Midway Games
The Suite Life of Zack & Cody: Tipton Caper	2006	GBA	Buena Vista Games
The Suite Life of Zack & Cody: Tipton Trouble	2006	DS	Buena Vista Games
Teen Titans 2: The Brotherhood's Revenge	2006	GBA	Majesco
Disney's Kim Possible: What's the Switch?	2006	PS2	Buena Vista Games
The Sims 2: Pets	2006	GBA	EA
Happy Feet	2006	DS, Wii, PS2, GC, GBA, PC	Midway Games
Disney's Kim Possible: Global Gemini	2007	DS	Buena Vista Games
Drake & Josh	2007	GBA	THQ
Drake & Josh: Talent Showdown	2007	DS	THQ
Enchanted: Once Upon Andalasia	2007	GBA	Buena Vista Games
High School Musical: Livin' the Dream	2007	GBA	Buena Vista Games
High School Musical: Makin' the Cut!	2007	DS	Buena Vista Games
Spider-Man: Friend or Foe	2007	DS, PSP	Activision
The Suite Life of Zack & Cody: Circle of Spies	2007	DS	Disney Interactive Studios
Power Rangers: Super Legends	2007	DS, PS2, PC	Disney Interactive Studios
High School Musical: Sing It!	2007	PS2, Wii	Disney Interactive Studios
The Golden Compass	2007	DS	Sega
High School Musical 2: Work This Out!	2008	DS	Disney Interactive Studios
Iron Man	2008	DS, Wii, PS2, PSP, PC	Sega
The Mummy: Tomb of the Dragon Emperor	2008	DS	Vivendi Games
Mercenaries 2: World in Flames	2008	PS2	Electronic Arts
Transformers Animated: The Game	2008	DS	Activision
Kung Fu Panda: Legendary Warriors	2008	DS, Wii	Activision
The Lord of the Rings: Conquest	2009	DS	EA
MySims Racing	2009	DS, Wii	EA
Scene It? Bright Lights! Big Screen!	2009	PS3, X360, Wii	Warner Bros. Interactive Entertainment
Ice Age: Dawn of the Dinosaurs	2009	DS	Activision
Indiana Jones and the Staff of Kings	2009	DS, Wii, PS2	LucasArts
Shorts	2009	DS	Majesco
Tetris	2009	PSN (PSP)	EA
Wet	2009	PS3, X360	Bethesda Softworks
Dante's Inferno	2010	PSP	EA
Revenge of the Wounded Dragons	2010	PS3	Sony Computer Entertainment
Naughty Bear	2010	PS3, X360	505 Games
3D Ultra Minigolf Adventures 2	2010	PS3, X360	Konami

=== As Behaviour Interactive ===
Game title	Year released	Platform	Publisher
Jersey Devil	1997	PS, PC	NA: Sony Computer Entertainment; EU: Ocean Software
Bugs Bunny: Lost in Time	1999	PS, PC	Infogrames
MySims SkyHeroes	2010	X360, Wii, PS3, DS	EA
Doritos Crash Course	2010	X360	Microsoft Studios
Tetris	2011	PSN (PS3)	EA
Monkey Quest	2011	PC	Nickelodeon
Ghostbusters: Sanctum of Slime	2011	PSN (PS3), XLA (X360), PC	Atari
Rango: The Video Game	2011	X360, Wii, PS3, DS	EA; Paramount Digital Entertainment
Transformers: Dark of the Moon	2011	Wii, 3DS, DS	Activision
Wipeout in the Zone	2011	X360	Activision
Alvin and the Chipmunks: Chipwrecked	2011	Wii, DS, X360	NA: Majesco; EU: 505 Games
Victorious: Hollywood Arts Debut	2011	DS	D3 Publisher
Voltron: Defender of the Universe	2011	PSN (PS3), XLA (X360)	THQ
Brave: The Video Game	2012	Wii, DS, PS3, X360, PC	Disney Interactive Studios
Ice Age: Continental Drift – Arctic Games	2012	Wii, 3DS, DS, X360 PS3, PC	Activision
Wipeout 3	2012	Wii, Wii U, X360	Activision
Naughty Bear: Panic in Paradise	2012	PSN (PS3), XLA (X360)	505 Games
Monsters University	2013	iOS, Android	Disney Mobile
After Earth	2013	iOS, Android	Reliance Games
Doritos Crash Course 2	2013	X360	Microsoft Studios
Disney's Planes	2013	Wii, Wii U	Disney Interactive Studios
Pacific Rim: The Mobile Game	2013	iOS, Android	
Phineas and Ferb: Quest for Cool Stuff	2013	Wii, Wii U, 3DS, DS, X360	NA: Majesco; EU: 505 Games
SpongeBob SquarePants: Plankton's Robotic Revenge	2013	Wii, Wii U, 3DS, DS, PS3, X360	Activision
R.B.I. Baseball 14	2014	iOS, Android, PC, PS3, PS4, X360, XOne	MLB Advanced Media
Zoo Tycoon: Friends	2014	Windows 8, Windows Phone	Microsoft Studios
Middle-earth: Shadow of Mordor	2014	PS3, X360	Warner Bros. Interactive Entertainment
Pro Feel Golf	2015	iOS, Android	Behaviour Interactive
SpongeBob HeroPants	2015	3DS, PS Vita, X360	Activision
Home: Boov Pop!	2015	iOS, Android	Behaviour Interactive
Fallout Shelter	2015	iOS, Android, PC, Switch, PS4, XOne	Bethesda Softworks
The Peanuts Movie: Snoopy's Grand Adventure	2015	3DS, PS4, Wii U, X360, XOne	Activision
Dead by Daylight	2016	PC, Switch, PS4, PS5, Stadia, XOne, XSX/S	Starbreeze Studios (2016–2018); Behaviour Interactive (2018–present)
Warhammer 40,000: Eternal Crusade	2016	PC	Bandai Namco
Love & Hip Hop The Game	2016	iOS, Android	Behaviour Interactive
Halo Wars: Definitive Edition	2016	XOne, PC	Microsoft Studios
Assassin's Creed: Rebellion	2017	iOS, Android	Ubisoft
Westworld	2018	iOS, Android	Warner Bros. Interactive Entertainment
Deathgarden	2018–2019	PS4, XOne, PC	Behaviour Interactive
Game of Thrones: Beyond the Wall	2020	iOS, Android	Behaviour Interactive
Dead by Daylight Mobile	2020–2025	iOS, Android	Behaviour Interactive; NetEase Games (2022–2025)
Hooked on You: A Dead by Daylight Dating Sim	2022	PC	Behaviour Interactive
Meet Your Maker	2023	PC, PS4, PS5, XOne, XSX/S	Behaviour Interactive
Silent Hill: Ascension	2023–2024	Web browser, Android, iOS	Genvid Entertainment
What the Fog	2024	PC (Steam)	Behaviour Interactive
The Casting of Frank Stone	2024	PC, PS5, XSX/S	Behaviour Interactive; Publisher only; Developed by Supermassive Games
Worms Across Worlds	2025	IOS, IPadOS, MacOS, TvOS	Team17
Monopoly: Star Wars Heroes vs. Villains	2026	PC, Switch, Switch2, PS5, XSX/S	Ubisoft
Serious Sam: Shatterverse	2026	PC, PS5, XSX/S	Devolver Digital
Exterminauts	TBA	PC, PS5, XSX/S	Level Infinite
