= List of Tom Clancy's Rainbow Six Siege downloadable content =

Major updates in Tom Clancy's Rainbow Six Siege

There have been 42 seasons in 11 years of Tom Clancy's Rainbow Six Siege in the form of downloadable content. In most of the seasons, the downloadable content has usually fixed a glitch in the game, introduced a new map or a rework of an existing one, and one or two new operators to play. The inaugural season began in February 2016 with Operation Black Ice, and the game is currently in its forty-third season, Operation Split Fire, which is the third season of Year 11. There are currently 27 maps between four game modes, and 78 operators to choose from between attacking and defending.

== Initial release (2015–2016) ==
Tom Clancy's Rainbow Six Siege initially launched on 1 December 2015. The base game featured 21 operators (known as the "Pathfinders") and 11 maps.

New operator(s)				New map(s)	Ref.
Name	Role	Real-world affiliation	Description	New map(s)	Ref.
Recruit (Note: Later replaced by Striker and Sentry in Operation New Blood in 2024.)	Both	None	Recruit is the default operator that is both an attacker and defender that does not possess a special gadget or ability. All new players automatically unlock Recruit for free.	(United States) Bank	
(United Kingdom) Sledge	Attacker	Special Air Service	Sledge is an attacking operator that possesses a sledgehammer that can break open non-reinforced walls, barricades, and hatches.	(United States) Bartlett University	
(United Kingdom) Thatcher	Attacker	Special Air Service	(Pre-rework) Thatcher is an attacking operator that possesses 4 EMP grenades that disables enemy electronic devices within range.	(France) Chalet	
(United Kingdom) Smoke	Defender	Special Air Service	Smoke is a defending operator that possesses gas grenades that can be attached to walls or ceilings. When detonated, the grenades create a cloud of chemical gas that damage the health of enemies within the area. However, only one grenade can be detonated at a time.	(Germany) Clubhouse	
(United Kingdom) Mute	Defender	Special Air Service	Mute is a defending operator who possesses four signal jammers that can completely disable enemy drones and other gadgets if they are placed within the radius of the jammer. This now only works for non-autonomous gadgets, like Thermites hard breach charage.	(Ivory Coast) Consulate	
(United States) Ash	Attacker	FBI SWAT	Ash is an attacking operator who possesses a rocket launcher-style charge that can breach open non-reinforced walls, barricades, and hatches.	(United Kingdom) Hereford Base	
(United States) Thermite	Attacker	FBI SWAT	Thermite is an attacking operator who possesses 3 hard breach charges that can breach reinforced walls, doors, and hatches.	(United States) House	
(United States) Castle	Defender	FBI SWAT	Castle is a defending operator who possesses reinforced barricades that can seal doorframes and windows.	(Russia) Kafe Dostoyevsky	
(United States) Pulse	Defender	FBI SWAT	Pulse is a defending operator who possesses a heartbeat detector that can detect enemy heartbeats through walls and floors.	(Germany) Kanal	
(France) Twitch	Attacker	GIGN	Twitch is an attacking operator who possesses a specialized drone that can shoot and destroy enemy gadgets.	(United States) Oregon	
(France) Montagne	Attacker	GIGN	Montagne is a shielded attacking operator who has the ability to expand his shield to provide full body protection. However, this prevents Montagne from moving.	(United Kingdom) Presidential Plane	
(France) Doc	Defender	GIGN	Doc is a defending operator who possesses a special gun that can shoot medical stimulants to injured teammates, providing them with health regeneration. Doc can also revive down-but-not-out teammates by shooting them as well as self-reviving himself.		
(France) Rook	Defender	GIGN	Rook is a defending operator who possesses an armor pack that he can place down. All of Rook's teammates can take an armor pack, which provides them with reduced body damage when shot and the ability to self-revive themselves when down-but-not-out.		
(Russia) Glaz	Attacker	Spetsnaz	Glaz is an attacking operator who possesses a marksman rifle used for sniping. His ability includes a special thermal scope on his rifle that allows him to see enemy bodies through smoke.		
(Russia) Fuze	Attacker	Spetsnaz	Fuze is an attacking operator who has four "cluster charges" that can shoot explosive bombs through walls, floors, or barricades.		
(Russia) Kapkan	Defender	Spetsnaz	Kapkan is a defending operator who possesses five laser booby trap-style devices that attach to doorframes and window frames. Enemies who walk through the traps lose 60 health.		
(Russia) Tachanka	Defender	Spetsnaz	Tachanka is a defending operator with an incendiary grenade launcher, which can be used to deny entry into the bomb site.		
(Germany) Blitz	Attacker	GSG 9	Blitz is a shielded attacking operator who has greater mobility than Montagne, but a smaller shield that provides less body coverage. Blitz's ballistic shield can flash and briefly blind enemies.		
(Germany) IQ	Attacker	GSG 9	IQ is an attacking operator who possesses a small device that can scan for, identify, and locate enemy devices.		
(Germany) Jӓger	Defender	GSG 9	Jӓger is a defending operator who can attach devices to walls and floors that detect and destroy any enemy gadgets thrown within a certain radius.		
(Germany) Bandit	Defender	GSG 9	Bandit is a defending operator who possesses four "Shock Wires", which are electronic gadgets that can fully electrify reinforced walls and barbed wires.		

== Year 1 (2016–2017) ==
Season	Name	Release date	New operator(s)				New map(s)	Ref.
Season	Name	Release date	Name	Role	Real-world affiliation	Description	New map(s)	Ref.
1	Operation Black Ice	2 February 2016	(Canada) Buck	Attacker	Joint Task Force 2	Buck is an attacking operator that has an under-barrel M26 shotgun.	(Canada) Yacht	
1	Operation Black Ice	2 February 2016	(Canada) Frost	Defender	Joint Task Force 2	Frost is a defending operator who can use a device similar to a bear-trap to incapacitate enemies.	(Canada) Yacht	
2	Operation Dust Line	10 May 2016	(United States) Blackbeard	Attacker	Navy SEALs	(Pre-rework) Blackbeard is an attacking operator that has a mountable see-though shield to his main weapon. He has 2 bulletproof shields on release, but slowly got nerfed into 20 hp.	Border (Note: Border is described as being located in the Middle East, with no specific country given.)	
2	Operation Dust Line	10 May 2016	(United States) Valkyrie	Defender	Navy SEALs	Valkyrie is a defending operator that has three omnidirectional cameras that are throwable onto any surface.	Border	
3	Operation Skull Rain	2 August 2016	(Brazil) Capitão	Attacker	BOPE	Capitão is an attacking operator that has a tactical crossbow capable of loading asphyxiating bolts, that will burn oxygen within a certain radius, or smoke grenade bolts that create a thick cloud of smoke.	(Brazil) Favela	
3	Operation Skull Rain	2 August 2016	(Brazil) Caveira	Defender	BOPE	Caveira is a defending operator that has an ability known as "Silent Step", allowing her to make less noise when moving as well as interrogate an immobilized enemy for the location of other enemies.	(Brazil) Favela	
4	Operation Red Crow	17 November 2016	(Japan) Hibana	Attacker	Special Assault Team	As an attacking operator, Hibana possesses a weapon that launches up to sixteen pellets shot in either charges of 2, 4, or 6 that attach to and break reinforced walls.	(Japan) Skyscraper	
4	Operation Red Crow	17 November 2016	(Japan) Echo	Defender	Special Assault Team	Echo is a defending operator that uses a drone capable of releasing sonic blasts to disorient enemies.	(Japan) Skyscraper	

== Year 2 (2017–2018) ==
Season	Name	Release date	New operator(s)				New map(s)	Ref.
Season	Name	Release date	Name	Role	Real-world affiliation	Description	New map(s)	Ref.
1	Operation Velvet Shell	7 February 2017	(Spain) Jackal	Attacker	GEO	Jackal is a tracker on the attacking team who can reveal the location of enemies by tracking their footprints.	(Spain) Coastline	
1	Operation Velvet Shell	7 February 2017	(Spain) Mira	Defender	GEO	Mira is a defender who can create one-way ejectable bulletproof windows on walls, leaving space for operators to fire through.	(Spain) Coastline	
2	Operation Health	7 June 2017	No new operators or map updates (Note: Operation Health was an update that fine-tuned many of the game's aspects, including fixes to hitboxes, spawn killing and audio issues. The update resulted in the delay of planned season's content and the cancellation of a map.)					
3	Operation Blood Orchid	5 September 2017	(Hong Kong) Ying	Attacker	Special Duties Unit	Ying is an attacking operator that utilizes candela cluster charges that can be thrown or attached to a surface to stun enemies, similar to a stun grenade.	(Hong Kong) Theme Park	
3	Operation Blood Orchid	5 September 2017	(Hong Kong) Lesion	Defender	Special Duties Unit	Lesion is a defending operator that uses poison mines that slow and cause damage to an enemy over time when triggered.	(Hong Kong) Theme Park	
3	Operation Blood Orchid	5 September 2017	(Poland) Ela	Defender	GROM	Ela is a defending operator that possesses proximity concussion mines that can be attached to multiple surfaces to disorient enemies.	(Hong Kong) Theme Park	
4	Operation White Noise	5 December 2017	(Poland) Zofia	Attacker	GROM	Zofia is an attacker who carries a double-barreled grenade launcher capable of launching explosive or concussion grenades.	(South Korea) Tower	
4	Operation White Noise	5 December 2017	(South Korea) Dokkaebi	Attacker	707th Special Mission Battalion	Dokkaebi is an attacker who can hack enemy phones to make them ring, revealing their position. She can also hack the phone of a dead defender to give attackers access to cameras.	(South Korea) Tower	
4	Operation White Noise	5 December 2017	(South Korea) Vigil	Defender	707th Special Mission Battalion	Vigil is a defender who uses a cloaking device to become invisible to all drones and cameras.	(South Korea) Tower	

== Year 3 (2018–2019) ==
Season	Name	Release date	New operator(s)				New map(s)	Ref.
Season	Name	Release date	Name	Role	Real-world affiliation	Description	New map(s)	Ref.
1	Operation Chimera	6 March 2018	(France) Lion	Attacker	GIGN	Lion is an attacking operator that uses a UAV to expose moving enemies via sonar temporarily.	No map update	
1	Operation Chimera	6 March 2018	(Belarus) Finka	Attacker	Spetsnaz	Finka is an attacking operator and uses nanomachines to temporarily increase the health and accuracy of herself and her teammates, as well as reviving any downed teammates. Her ability also increases their heart and breathing rate, thus weakening them by increasing the damage taken by Smoke's toxic gas canisters, increasing the range Pulse's heartbeat scanner can detect them, and hindering their ability to listen for footsteps.	No map update	
2	Operation Para Bellum	7 June 2018	(Italy) Maestro	Defender	GIS	Maestro is a defending operator that can install a bulletproof wall-mounted directed-energy turret that he can then operate remotely, damaging enemies with rapid laser fire. When the turret is firing it is no longer bulletproof, and after a certain number of shots, the turret can overheat and has to cool down.	(Italy) Villa	
2	Operation Para Bellum	7 June 2018	(Italy) Alibi	Defender	GIS	Alibi is a defending operator who can project inanimate holograms of herself, which expose the location of any enemy that interacts with the hologram with their weapons, body, or drone.	(Italy) Villa	
3	Operation Grim Sky	4 September 2018	(United States) Maverick	Attacker	Delta Force	Maverick is an attacking operator who uses a small handheld blowtorch that can create small holes in reinforced walls, opening new lines of sight.	(United Kingdom) Hereford Base (Note: Rework of existing map.)	
3	Operation Grim Sky	4 September 2018	(United Kingdom) Clash	Defender	Metropolitan Police Service	(Pre-rework) Clash is the first shield-wielding defender. Her shield is similar to Montagne's, with the addition of a device called the "Crowd Control Electro Shield", or "CCE", which emits an electric field that slows and damages attackers.	(United Kingdom) Hereford Base	
4	Operation Wind Bastion	4 December 2018	(Morocco) Nomad	Attacker	GIGR	Nomad, an attacking operator, possesses a weapon attachment called an "AirJab launcher", which launches proximity-triggered air-blast grenades that can stick to surfaces and throw opposing operators to the ground.	(Morocco) Fortress	
4	Operation Wind Bastion	4 December 2018	(Morocco) Kaid	Defender	GIGR	Kaid, a defending operator, can throw a gadget called "Electroclaws" that can electrify reinforced surfaces, barbed wire, and deployable shields.	(Morocco) Fortress	

== Year 4 (2019–2020) ==
Season	Name	Release date	New operator(s)				New map(s)	Ref.
Season	Name	Release date	Name	Role	Real-world affiliation	Description	New map(s)	Ref.
1	Operation Burnt Horizon	6 March 2019	(Australia) Gridlock	Attacker	Special Air Service Regiment	Gridlock is an attacker that has a gadget called "Trax Stingers", which is a throwable gadget that deploys multiple road spike-like hexagonal stinger mats until they are either destroyed or cover the area.	(Australia) Outback	
1	Operation Burnt Horizon	6 March 2019	(Australia) Mozzie	Defender	Special Air Service Regiment	Mozzie is a defender whose gadget is an autonomous robot called "Pest" that hacks the attacker's drones, letting him use them.	(Australia) Outback	
2	Operation Phantom Sight	11 June 2019	(Denmark) Nøkk	Attacker	Jaeger Corps	Nøkk is an attacking operator who uses her "HEL Presence Reduction Device" to wipe her images from cameras.	(Russia) Kafe Dostoyevsky	
2	Operation Phantom Sight	11 June 2019	(United States) Warden	Defender	United States Secret Service	Warden is a defending operator who comes equipped with a pair of "Glance Smart Glasses", which eliminate the effects of flashbangs and allow him to see through smoke. He must stay still to make full effect of his gadget.	(Russia) Kafe Dostoyevsky	
3	Operation Ember Rise	11 September 2019	(Peru) Amaru	Attacker	None	Amaru is an attacking operator who uses a "Garra Hook" to grapple or hoist herself onto or through ledges, windows, or open hatches.	(Germany) Kanal	
3	Operation Ember Rise	11 September 2019	(Mexico) Goyo	Defender	FES	Goyo is a defender who possesses "Volcán Shields" that are similar to deployable shields but armed with incendiary bombs on the rear end, which can be detonated by gunfire.	(Germany) Kanal	
4	Operation Shifting Tides	3 December 2019	(India) Kali	Attacker	None	Kali is an attacking operator armed with a CSRX 300 bolt-action marksman rifle that can toggle between 5× and 12× magnification. Her weapon also comes with an under-barrel attachment known as the "LV Explosive Lance", which is capable of destroying defenders' gadgets that are within its radius of effect.	(Hong Kong) Theme Park	
4	Operation Shifting Tides	3 December 2019	(Kenya) Wamai	Defender	None	Wamai is a defending operator who uses the "Mag-NET System" that captures the projectiles of attacking operators thrown or launched within its radius and then releases them after a short time for them to take effect finally. Wamai is the first DLC defending operator to have an assault rifle in his loadout.	(Hong Kong) Theme Park	

== Year 5 (2020–2021) ==
Season	Name	Release date	New operator(s)				New map(s)	Ref.
Season	Name	Release date	Name	Role	Real-world affiliation	Description	New map(s)	Ref.
1	Operation Void Edge	10 March 2020	(Netherlands) Iana	Attacker	European Space Agency	Iana, is an attacking operator whose gadget, the "Gemini Replicator", creates a controllable hologram similar to Alibi's gadget, but you cannot use your weapon.	(United States) Oregon	
1	Operation Void Edge	10 March 2020	(Jordan) Oryx	Defender	None	Oryx is a defending operator who has no technological gadget. Instead, his ability is the "Remah Dash", which can allow him to run through breakable walls (at the cost of five health points per use), jump up through broken hatches, and knockdown opponents.	(United States) Oregon	
2	Operation Steel Wave	16 June 2020	(Norway) Ace	Attacker	FSK	Ace is an attacker whose unique gadget is the "SELMA Aqua Breacher". This gadget can be thrown in a similar manner to a grenade where it will deploy up to three hydraulically powered breaching charges that will sequentially detonate large holes into soft or reinforced surfaces.	(United States) House	
2	Operation Steel Wave	16 June 2020	(South Africa) Melusi	Defender	None	Melusi is a defending operator whose unique gadget is the "Banshee Sonic Defense" gadget, which emits a low frequency humming noise that dramatically reduces attacker movement and alerts defenders to their position when within its effective radius.	(United States) House	
3	Operation Shadow Legacy	10 September 2020	(United States) Zero	Attacker	None	The attacker Zero's unique gadget is the "ARGUS Launcher", which allows him to deploy multiple two-way cameras on soft or reinforced surfaces that can fire a single-shot laser that can destroy defender gadgets in a single hit.	(France) Chalet	
3	Operation Shadow Legacy	10 September 2020	(Russia) Tachanka (Note: Rework of existing operator.)	Defender	Spetsnaz	The existing defending operator Tachanka was reworked to remove his mounted gun ability and replace it with a launcher that fires incendiary charges.	(France) Chalet	
4	Operation Neon Dawn	1 December 2020	(Thailand) Aruni	Defender	Royal Thai Police	Aruni is a defending operator who possesses a laser gate, when attached to a doorway or wall, can damage one attacker or destroy one attacker gadget every 30 seconds.	(Japan) Skyscraper	

== Year 6 (2021–2022) ==
Season	Name	Release date	New operator(s)				New map(s)	Ref.
Season	Name	Release date	Name	Role	Real-world affiliation	Description	New map(s)	Ref.
1	Operation Crimson Heist	16 March 2021	(Argentina) Flores	Attacker	None	Flores is an attacking operator whose unique gadget is the "RCE-Ratero Charge" drone, which is an explosive drone that can be both manually and automatically detonated with enough power to breach soft surfaces, clear defender utility and kill operators.	Border	
2	Operation North Star	14 June 2021	(Canada) Thunderbird	Defender	None	Thunderbird is a defending operator whose unique gadget is the "Kóna Station", which is a deployable gadget that automatically shoots healing pellets to defenders within range. The Kóna Station can also revive operators in a DBNO state.	(Brazil) Favela	
3	Operation Crystal Guard	7 September 2021	(Croatia) Osa	Attacker	None	Osa is an attacking operator whose unique gadget is the "Talon-8 Shield", a bulletproof clear shield that can be both carried and deployed by the player. It can be deployed directly on the ground, or through barricaded windows. It has a pressurized gas canister similar to the canister on Mira's "Black Mirror", which destroys the entire window when it is hit.	(Germany) Clubhouse	
3	Operation Crystal Guard	7 September 2021	(Croatia) Osa	Attacker	None	Osa is an attacking operator whose unique gadget is the "Talon-8 Shield", a bulletproof clear shield that can be both carried and deployed by the player. It can be deployed directly on the ground, or through barricaded windows. It has a pressurized gas canister similar to the canister on Mira's "Black Mirror", which destroys the entire window when it is hit.	(United States) Bank	
3	Operation Crystal Guard	7 September 2021	(Croatia) Osa	Attacker	None	Osa is an attacking operator whose unique gadget is the "Talon-8 Shield", a bulletproof clear shield that can be both carried and deployed by the player. It can be deployed directly on the ground, or through barricaded windows. It has a pressurized gas canister similar to the canister on Mira's "Black Mirror", which destroys the entire window when it is hit.	(Spain) Coastline	
4	Operation High Calibre	30 November 2021	(Republic of Ireland) Thorn	Defender	Garda Emergency Response Unit	Thorn is a defender with the "Razorbloom Shell" gadget. This gadget attaches to walls and ceilings and explodes once the player is in proximity of it, propagating shrapnel within a certain radius. It behaves like a proximity mine, and has falloff like grenades do.	(Australia) Outback	

== Year 7 (2022–2023) ==
Season	Name	Release date	New operator(s)				New map(s)	Ref.
Season	Name	Release date	Name	Role	Real-world affiliation	Description	New map(s)	Ref.
1	Operation Demon Veil	15 March 2022	(Japan) Azami	Defender	Tokyo Metropolitan Police Department	Azami is a defending operator whose unique gadget is the "Kiba Barrier". This barrier is a throwable kunai blade that creates a circular concrete barrier at its impact point. This wall is destructible, with 999 hp, and can be destroyed by explosives, melee, or other gadgets, such as Sledge's hammer.	(Northern Ireland) Emerald Plains	
2	Operation Vector Glare	14 June 2022	(Belgium) Sens	Attacker	Special Forces Group	Sens is an attacking operator whose unique gadget is the "ROU Projector", a disc-shaped device that can be rolled and creates a light screen in its path. This screen obstructs player vision, but does not block any damage, projectiles, or bullets.	(Greece) Close Quarter (Note: The Close Quarter map is exclusive to the Deathmatch gamemode.)	
3	Operation Brutal Swarm	6 September 2022	(Singapore) Grim	Attacker	Naval Diving Unit	Grim is an attacker who brings the "Kawan Hive Launcher". This gadget is a grenade launcher that shoots canisters that will stick to a surface, and drop a swarm of nanobots that track defenders walking through them. Any defender in the swarm will be continuously pinged to the attacking team, giving their location away in real time. Once a defender leaves the affected area of the swarm, the nanobots will continue to ping them every few seconds, until the effect goes away after a few pings.	(Greece) Stadium Bravo	
4	Operation Solar Raid	6 December 2022	(Colombia) Solis	Defender	AFEAU	Solis is a defending operator with the "Spec-IO Electro Sensor". This is a unique gadget that detects enemy electronic devices when activated, and allows the player to ping them for teammates to see. Solis can also activate a "Cluster Scan," which will ping all devices in her sight for her teammates.	(Singapore) Nighthaven Labs	

== Year 8 (2023–2024) ==
Season	Name	Release date	New operator(s)				New map(s)	Ref.
Season	Name	Release date	Name	Role	Real-world affiliation	Description	New map(s)	Ref.
1	Operation Commanding Force	7 March 2023	(Brazil) Brava	Attacker	COT	Brava is an attacker with the "Kludge" drone. The Kludge drone allows Brava to infiltrate the objective sites and remotely hack defender gadgets. Brava has two Kludge drones that have three charges each. The Kludge drone can hack any electronic defender gadget and change its allegiance to the attacking team. Hacked gadgets have a subtle glow to them (color varies according to in-game team color preferences) that distinguish the hacked gadget from any unaltered defender gadgets.	No map update	
2	Operation Dread Factor	30 May 2023	(Sweden) Fenrir	Defender	Special Operations Group	Fenrir is a defender whose gadget is the "F-NATT Dread Mine", which are throwable gadgets that adhere to any surface, and can deploy up to five at a time. By default, the mine is inactive, where it is closed and bulletproof. By looking at a mine and interacting with it, even through walls, Fenrir can activate up to three of his mines. Once activated, if an enemy operator enters its active range, it will open up and release a purple gas. Enemies that are affected by this gas will have their sight severely impaired, with a purple haze effect reducing the distance they can see. However, while generating gas, the mine is no longer bulletproof.	(Ivory Coast) Consulate	
3	Operation Heavy Mettle	29 August 2023	(South Korea) Ram	Attacker	Republic of Korea Army Special Warfare Command	Ram is an attacker whose unique gadget is the "BU-GI Auto Breacher", a large deployable tank-like drone that will travel automatically in a straight line, or in a curved path to either side when activated. When activated, it will destroy all breakable walls and deployables in its path, along with destroying a significant width of floor paneling, if the floor beneath it is destructible. The BU-GI is bulletproof, but can be destroyed with explosives, or by shooting a red gas canister on its rear.	No map update	
4	Operation Deep Freeze	6 December 2023	(Portugal) Tubarão	Defender	Special Actions Detachment	Tubarão is a defender whose unique gadget is the "Zoto Canister", a throwable device that creates an area which temporarily slows enemies, freezes both attacker and defender gadgets to delay use, and leaves attacker footprints visible through the floor.	(Portugal) Lair	

== Year 9 (2024–2025) ==
Season	Name	Release date	New operator(s)				New map(s)	Ref.
Season	Name	Release date	Name	Role	Real-world affiliation	Description	New map(s)	Ref.
1	Operation Deadly Omen	12 March 2024	(United States) Deimos	Attacker	ATF	Deimos is an attacker with a gadget known as the "DeathMARK", which is an automatic drone that can target any defender who has had their identity revealed, and reveal their location only to Deimos, but also reveals Deimos's position to the target to a lesser extent. However, while the gadget is in use, Deimos is restricted to using his unique .44 Vendetta, a powerful revolver with a custom holographic sight.	No map update	
2	Operation New Blood	11 June 2024	Striker	Attacker	None	Striker, an attacker, and Sentry, a defender, both replaced Recruit as the default operators automatically unlocked by new players. Neither operator possesses a unique gadget or ability.	No map update	
2	Operation New Blood	11 June 2024	Sentry	Defender	None	Striker, an attacker, and Sentry, a defender, both replaced Recruit as the default operators automatically unlocked by new players. Neither operator possesses a unique gadget or ability.	No map update	
3	Operation Twin Shells	10 September 2024	(Greece) Skopós	Attacker	Special Suppressive Antiterrorist Unit	Skopós is an attacking operator who possesses "V10 Pantheon Shells", which are a pair of humanoid robots that can be remotely controlled. She can switch between bodies at any time, but can only control one body at a time. The unused body crouches down and deploys a bulletproof shield for protection, and can serve as a camera as well.	No map update	
4	Operation Collision Point	3 December 2024	(United States) Blackbeard	Attacker	Navy SEALs	The existing attacking operator Blackbeard was reworked to provide him a full-sized shield instead of his original mountable face shield for his rifle.	No map update	

== Year 10 (2025–2026) ==
Season	Name	Release date	New operator(s)				New map(s)	Ref.
Season	Name	Release date	Name	Role	Real-world affiliation	Description	New map(s)	Ref.
1	Operation Prep Phase	4 March 2025	(New Zealand) Rauora	Attacker	New Zealand Special Air Service	Rauora is an attacking operator who has the ability to deploy bulletproof panels that seal a variety of doorways within maps.	No map update	
2	Operation Daybreak (Note: Operation Daybreak also included the rebranding of the game to Tom Clancy's Rainbow Six Siege X, which included numerous gameplay updates, new mechanics, and other miscellaneous changes, including a new 6v6 game mode known as "Dual Front".)	18 June 2025	(United Kingdom) Clash	Defender	Metropolitan Police Service	The existing defending operator Clash was reworked to allow her to sprint, crouch, and break through barricades with her CCE shield, while also being able to deploy the shield on the ground, though this makes it destructible by opponents.	(United States) District (Note: Exclusive for "Dual Front" game mode.)	
2	Operation Daybreak	18 June 2025	(United Kingdom) Clash	Defender	Metropolitan Police Service	The existing defending operator Clash was reworked to allow her to sprint, crouch, and break through barricades with her CCE shield, while also being able to deploy the shield on the ground, though this makes it destructible by opponents.	(United States) Bank	
2	Operation Daybreak	18 June 2025	(United Kingdom) Clash	Defender	Metropolitan Police Service	The existing defending operator Clash was reworked to allow her to sprint, crouch, and break through barricades with her CCE shield, while also being able to deploy the shield on the ground, though this makes it destructible by opponents.	Border	
2	Operation Daybreak	18 June 2025	(United Kingdom) Clash	Defender	Metropolitan Police Service	The existing defending operator Clash was reworked to allow her to sprint, crouch, and break through barricades with her CCE shield, while also being able to deploy the shield on the ground, though this makes it destructible by opponents.	(France) Chalet	
2	Operation Daybreak	18 June 2025	(United Kingdom) Clash	Defender	Metropolitan Police Service	The existing defending operator Clash was reworked to allow her to sprint, crouch, and break through barricades with her CCE shield, while also being able to deploy the shield on the ground, though this makes it destructible by opponents.	(Germany) Clubhouse	
2	Operation Daybreak	18 June 2025	(United Kingdom) Clash	Defender	Metropolitan Police Service	The existing defending operator Clash was reworked to allow her to sprint, crouch, and break through barricades with her CCE shield, while also being able to deploy the shield on the ground, though this makes it destructible by opponents.	(Russia) Kafe Dostoyevsky	
3	Operation High Stakes	2 September 2025	(Switzerland) Denari	Defender	None	Denari is a defender with a gadget known as the "T.R.I.P Connector" which is used to create laser beams (if 2 or more are placed) that when Attackers pass through they are slowed and damaged. Denari can place multiple to create a grid of lasers to deny entry. T.R.I.P Connectors cannot be obstructed or it will fail to link to the other Connector.	(Portugal) Lair	
3	Operation High Stakes	2 September 2025	(Switzerland) Denari	Defender	None	Denari is a defender with a gadget known as the "T.R.I.P Connector" which is used to create laser beams (if 2 or more are placed) that when Attackers pass through they are slowed and damaged. Denari can place multiple to create a grid of lasers to deny entry. T.R.I.P Connectors cannot be obstructed or it will fail to link to the other Connector.	(Singapore) Nighthaven Labs	
3	Operation High Stakes	2 September 2025	(Switzerland) Denari	Defender	None	Denari is a defender with a gadget known as the "T.R.I.P Connector" which is used to create laser beams (if 2 or more are placed) that when Attackers pass through they are slowed and damaged. Denari can place multiple to create a grid of lasers to deny entry. T.R.I.P Connectors cannot be obstructed or it will fail to link to the other Connector.	(Ivory Coast) Consulate	
4	Operation Tenfold Pursuit	2 December 2025	(United Kingdom) Thatcher	Attacker	Special Air Service	The existing attacking operator Thatcher was reworked to better disable defender electronics. His ability has been reworked from his EMP blasts to his E.G.S. Distributor, which can detect defender electronics from a distance and through obstructions. He was also given another primary weapon, the PRM90A2 which is a semi-automatic DMR.	(Morocco) Fortress	

== Year 11 (2026–2027) ==
Season	Name	Release date	New operator(s)				New map(s)	Ref.
Season	Name	Release date	Name	Role	Real-world affiliation	Description	New map(s)	Ref.
1	Operation Silent Hunt	3 March 2026	(United States) Solid Snake	Attacker	None	Solid Snake is a collaboration character from the Metal Gear Solid franchise. His ability is the "Soliton Radar Mk. III," which is a radar detector that can alert him of any enemy operators nearby. He also has the ability to gather secondary gadgets from fallen operators, including frag grenades, stun grenades, impact EMP grenades, smoke grenades, and breach charges.	No map update	
2	Operation System Override	2 June 2026	(South Korea) Dokkaebi	Attacker	707th Special Mission Battalion	Dokkaebi, the attacker from Y2 S4, got a rework of her Logic Bomb ability. Instead of targeting every player on the defending team with a phone call that creates noise at the enemy position, now one player is targeted, and if they fail to hang up the phone, the phone will explode dealing 40 damage and creating fire at their location. She also gained a new Assault rifle. Her ability to hack dropped phones and block observation tools are still in the game.	(United States) Calypso Casino	
3	Operation Split Fire	1 September 2026	(Egypt) Noor	Defender	Unit 777	Noor is a defending operators that possesses the Horus Lance Launcher, which can attach to shields of attackers, walls, and other surfaces, then ignite flames.	(Italy) Villa	
