= Familiar (disambiguation) =

A familiar is a supernatural entity believed to assist witches and cunning folk in their practice of magic.

Familiar may also refer to:

== Arts and entertainment ==
=== Film and television ===
- The Familiar (film), 2009 film
- "Familiar" (The X-Files), a 2018 episode of the American science fiction television series The X-Files

=== Literature ===
- The Familiars (novel), a 2010 series of children's fantasy books
- The Familiar (Animorphs), 41st book in the Animorphs series
- The Familiar, a book series by Mark Z. Danielewski starting with The Familiar, Volume 1: One Rainy Day in May and continued with The Familiar, Volume 2: Into the Forest
- Familiar (play), a 2015 play by Danai Gurira
- The Familiar (Bardugo novel), a 2024 historical fantasy novel by Leigh Bardugo

=== Music ===
- Familiar, a 2012 album by Brooke Miller
- Familiars (album), 2014 album by The Antlers
- Familiar, a 2017 album by Dieter Moebius
- "Familiar" (song), a 2018 song by Liam Payne and J Balvin

== Other ==
- A familiar was a lay associate of the Spanish Inquisition
- T–V distinction, contrast between second-person pronouns that are specialized for varying levels of familiarity
- Familiar Linux, Linux distribution for iPAQ machines and other PDAs

== See also ==
- Familiaris, a close associate of the king in several medieval courts
- Familiarity (disambiguation)
