= Horror Show =

Horror Show may refer to:

- The Horror Show a 1989 supernatural horror film
- Horror Show (album), an album by Iced Earth
- Gregory Horror Show, an anime
- The Rocky Horror Show, a long-running British stage musical
- Zee Horror Show, a television show
- Horrorshow (band), an Australian hip-hop duo
- Horrorshow (G.I. Joe), a fictional character in the G.I. Joe universe
- Horror Show (Graydon Creed), a fictional character in the Age Of Apocalypse Marvel Universe
- Horror Show, a debut EP by rock band The Graduate
- Horrorshow, a song by English rock band The Libertines
- Kitty Horrorshow, video game developer

Other

- "horrorshow", a word in Nadsat, the fictional language used in Anthony Burgess's A Clockwork Orange
  - Derived from хорошо (khorosho), a Russian language word meaning "very good."
