= House of Leaves =

2000 novel by Mark Z. Danielewski

- First-edition cover
- Author: Mark Z. Danielewski
- Genre: Horror; postmodern; ergodic; metafiction
- Publisher: Pantheon, Random House
- Publication date: March 7, 2000
- Publication place: United States
- Media type: Print (paperback and hardcover)
- Pages: 709 (paperback)
- ISBN: 0-375-70376-4
- Followed by: The Whalestoe Letters

House of Leaves (stylized with "House" in blue) is the debut novel by American author Mark Z. Danielewski, published in March 2000 by Pantheon Books. A bestseller, it has been translated into a number of languages, and is followed by a companion piece, The Whalestoe Letters.

The novel is written as a work of epistolary fiction and metafiction focusing on a fictional documentary film titled The Navidson Record, presented as a story within a story discussed in a handwritten monograph recovered by the primary narrator, Johnny Truant. The narrative makes heavy use of multiperspectivity as Truant's footnotes chronicle his efforts to transcribe the manuscript, which itself reveals The Navidson Record's supposed narrative through transcriptions and analysis depicting a story of a family who discovers a larger-on-the-inside labyrinth in their house.

House of Leaves maintains an academic publishing format with exhibits, appendices, and an index, as well as numerous footnotes including citations from the original author for nonexistent works, interjections and personal anecdotes from the narrator, and notes from the editors to whom he supposedly sent the work for publication. It is also distinguished by convoluted page layouts: some pages contain only a few words or lines of text, arranged to mirror the events in the story. At points, the book must be rotated to be read, making it a prime example of ergodic literature.

The book is most often described as a horror story, though the author has also endorsed readers' interpretation of it as a love story. House of Leaves has also been described as an encyclopedic novel, or conversely a satire of academia.

== Background ==
Danielewski dates the origin of the novel to 1990 and a story that he wrote after finding out that his father was dying:

1990. My father was head of the USC School of Theater. I was living in New York. Then I got the phone call. The 'Mark your father is dying' phone call. He was in the hospital. Renal failure, cancer. I got on a Greyhound bus and headed west. Over the course of three sleepless nights and three sleepless days I wrote a 100+ page piece entitled Redwood. I remember using a fountain pen. I barely had the change to buy sodas and snacks along the way and there I am scratching out words with this absurdly expensive thing of polished resin and gold. I'd like to say it was a Pelikan, but I don't think that's correct. Another thing I seem to remember: the paper I was writing on had a pale blue cast to it. There was also something about how the pen seemed to bite into the paper at the same time as it produced these lush sweeps of ink. A kind of cutting and spilling. Almost as if a page could bleed. My intention had been to present this piece of writing as a gift to my father. As has been mentioned many times before, my father responded with the suggestions that I pursue a career at the post office. I responded by reducing the manuscript to confetti, going so far as to throw myself a pity parade in a nearby dumpster. My sister responded by returning later to that dumpster, rescuing the confetti, and taping it all back together.

Writing House of Leaves took ten years, and between 1993 and 1999, Danielewski made a living as a tutor, barista, and plumber. He eventually found a literary agent in Warren Frazier, who, according to Danielewski, "fell in love with it." They went to roughly thirty-two publishers before Edward Kastenmeier from Pantheon decided to take on the project. Small sections of the book were downloadable off the internet before the release of the first edition, and it is said that these sections "circulated through the underbellies of Los Angeles, Las Vegas, and San Francisco, through strip clubs and recording studios, long before publication" – though very few were able to experience the book this way initially.

The first edition hardback, which featured special signed inserts, was released on February 29, 2000, and Pantheon released the hardback and paperback editions simultaneously on March 7, 2000. The novel went on to win the New York Public Library's Young Lions Fiction Award and gain a considerable cult following. House of Leaves has been translated into numerous languages, including Dutch, French, German, Greek, Italian, Japanese, Polish, Portuguese, Russian, Serbian, Spanish, and Turkish. It has been taught in universities.

== Summary ==
House of Leaves takes the form of an academic text written by the recently deceased blind academic Zampanò that covers The Navidson Record, a documentary film which supposedly became an American cultural phenomenon upon its theatrical release in 1993. The manuscript has been edited by Johnny Truant, an apprentice at a tattoo parlor in Los Angeles who claims to have found the book in unfinished form after Zampanò's death and has submitted it for posthumous publication in 1998, despite claiming to have never met Zampanò. Truant interjects the book with footnotes ranging from fact-checks and sources to seemingly irrelevant personal anecdotes; a group of professional editors who, in turn, claim to have never met Truant, have further proofread and edited the book.

Zampanò's text claims that The Navidson Record has generated interest from both academia and popular culture, citing and quoting academic journals, journalists, and pop interviews alike. Zampanò narrates and describes the film in detail, but also segues into topics such as photography, architecture, Biblical studies, and radiometric dating, detouring into his own seemingly unrelated tangents. Despite many of the cited sources claiming The Navidson Record is a work of found-footage horror fiction, Zampanò is adamant that the film is an authentic documentary. Truant, however, claims The Navidson Record does not exist at all; he cites findings that Navidson is a fictionalization of the real-life photojournalist Kevin Carter, and finds that Zampanò has either copied secondary sources or made them up entirely to hide his own inexpertise in various subjects.

Truant acts as an unreliable narrator himself, as he is inexperienced in many of the topics discussed and admits to changing or deleting parts of Zampanò's work; many footnotes, supplemental sources, pages, and blocks of text are also missing, supposedly destroyed by Zampanò, Truant, or someone else. The editors include an appendix to the book that contains several writings from both Zampanò and Truant excluded from the body of the book, an obituary for Truant's birth father, and a series of letters from Truant's mother Pelafina compiled in The Whalestoe Letters. A segment titled "Contrary Evidence", compiled by the editors themselves, contains evidence that supports The Navidson Record's actual existence, with a series of derivative works depicting scenes and concepts from the film as well as what purports to be a single, bootleg frame from within the film itself.

=== The Navidson Record ===
Zampanò's text narrates the lives of the Navidson family during the events depicted in The Navidson Record, filmed in April 1990 and supported by other sources describing events that were not part of the film. The family comprises photojournalist Will Navidson; his partner Karen Green, a former model; and their two children, Chad and Daisy. The film began as a simple autobiographical project after the Navidsons moved to a new home in Virginia and installed cameras throughout to capture their lives, but the footage instead captures the family's discovery that the house is somehow 1/4" larger on the inside than on the outside. Further, a dark hallway soon appears in the living room without warning or explanation.

After Navidson is briefly lost in the hallway, he is forbidden by Karen from entering the hallway again and hires a crew of professional explorers to investigate, who found a maze-like complex within it containing a spiral staircase which appeared to descend endlessly. In the maze, the explorers recorded footage of unlit, featureless corridors and rooms with smooth ash-gray walls, floors, and ceilings. The only sound in the maze was apparently an occasional low growling noise. The expeditions soon led to disaster when one member, Holloway, turned on the rest. After several ordeals, one explorer was killed and another rescued, but the house itself then transformed in a hostile fashion, killing Navidson's brother Tom and forcing the family to frantically escape.

Afterwards, Karen separated from Navidson, departing to New York City with their children. She became a filmmaker herself to cope with her separation and showed Navidson's footage to several well-known professionals, such as Stephen King, Stanley Kubrick, Douglas Hofstadter, Ken Burns, Harold Bloom, Camille Paglia, Hunter Thompson, Anne Rice, and Jacques Derrida. Meanwhile, Navidson took samples from the hallway to professional researchers, who found that some of them dated from a time before the earth itself.

Navidson's curiosity eventually got the best of him, and he returned to the house with his camera to explore the hallway, quickly becoming disoriented and lost and running out of supplies. He burned a book he had brought for light; the camera captures that the book is inexplicably titled House of Leaves. Meanwhile, Karen moved back into the house in hopes of finding Navidson, but the hallway was no longer there. When it finally appeared, she entered and found Navidson alive, but emaciated and maimed by frostbite and injury. Navidson and Karen safely exited the house and moved to Vermont, where they finally married.

=== Truant footnotes ===
Parallel to the plot of the Record, Truant's footnotes (written in the Courier Font) document his descent into obsession, delusions, and paranoia as he compiles the manuscript. He recounts tales of sexual encounters, his lust for a tattooed dancer he calls Thumper, and his bar-hopping with his friend Lude. Truant begins to neglect all else as he finishes the manuscript, soon believing that a formless and shapeless monster referred to as a "minotaur" existed within Navidson's house and is spread by those who become obsessed with the story; he believes that this "minotaur" is what killed Zampanò and is now stalking him.

Eventually, Truant's entire life falls apart; Lude is killed in a drug-induced motorcycle crash, and Truant loses his job, runs out of money, and becomes homeless. After finishing the manuscript, he sets fire to it, but this event doesn't stop the book from existing; he is last heard from after seeing a live band in a bar who has written songs based on House of Leaves despite it supposedly having not been published, and sitting under a tree telling himself things are going to be all right.

== Characters ==
=== Johnny Truant ===
Johnny Truant serves a dual role, as primary editor of Zampanò's academic study of The Navidson Record and protagonist as revealed through footnotes and appendices.

In the beginning of the book, Truant appears to be a normal young man who happens upon a trunk full of notes left behind by the now-deceased Zampanò. As Truant begins to do the editing, he begins to lose his grip on reality, and his life begins to erode around him. He stops bathing, rarely eats, stops going to work, and distances himself from essentially everyone, all in pursuit of organizing the book into a finished work that, he hopes, will finally bring him peace.

Initially intrigued by Zampanò's isolative tendencies and surreal sense of reality, Truant unknowingly sets himself up as a victim to the daunting task that awaits him. As Truant begins to organize Zampanò's manuscripts, Truant's personal footnotes detail the deterioration of Truant's own life with analogous references to alienation and insanity: once a trespasser to Zampanò's mad realm, Truant seems to become more comfortable in the environment as the story unfolds. He has hallucinations that parallel those of Zampanò and members of the house search team when he senses an inhuman presence behind him.

=== Zampanò ===
Though Truant attributes The Navidson Record to Zampanò as the author, Truant offers few concrete details about Zampanò's character or past, citing only information learned from Zampanò's former acquaintances. These include neighbors and various students and social workers, exclusively female, who volunteered as readers for Zampanò's research. Unable even to determine Zampanò's full name, Truant only confirms that Zampanò became blind some time during the 1950s, and was approximately eighty years old at the time of his death. Truant also learns that Zampanò was erratic and capricious in his lifestyle and writing habits, diagnosing him with graphomania.

Danielewski made Zampanò blind as a reference to blind authors Homer, John Milton and Jorge Luis Borges.

=== Pelafina H. Lièvre ===
Pelafina, more commonly referred to as simply "P.", is Johnny Truant's institutionalized mother who appears in the appendix to the text. Her story is more fully developed in The Whalestoe Letters.

=== Minor characters ===
Lude is Truant's best friend and the one who informs Truant of Zampanò's vacant apartment. Lude assists Truant multiple times in obtaining girls' phone numbers when they visit bars, clubs, and restaurants. Several times, Truant mentions that he wishes he had not answered Lude's call late at night. Every time Truant and Lude are together they seem to involve themselves in difficult situations. Lude dies in a motorcycle accident near the end of the novel.

Thumper is a stripper and regular client of the tattoo parlour where Truant works. Though Truant has encounters with many women, he remains fixated on Thumper throughout. Thumper's real name is eventually revealed to Truant, but never to the reader.

=== The Navidson Record ===
==== Will Navidson ====
Will Navidson is described as having become a successful war photographer thanks to an early military career in war-torn regions, though haunted by his role as an impartial documentarist of war. Navidson is a Pulitzer winner and recipient of prestigious arts grants, who has jeopardized his relationship with Karen due to years of prolonged absences while working overseas. As a conciliatory gesture, Navidson commits to prioritizing family over work by moving to the countryside. After promising Karen not to enter the hallway, he sends a crew in his stead to explore the maze, but privately chafes at this prohibition and breaks his word behind Karen's back.

Many citations to critics, scholars, and media coverage present Navidson as a well-known public figure, with his notoriety further compounded by the film's release; the extent of this public interest is such that academics are supposedly divided into three conflicting schools of thought interpreting his unexplained motivations for returning to the house.

==== Karen Green ====
Karen Green is described as Navidson's partner of many years, and a former fashion model. Despite rearing two children together, Karen is said to have refused marriage to maintain her independence, particularly during Navidson's absences. Karen is seen to have kept a collection of letters from would-be suitors, and interviews with associates reveal that she committed at least one adulterous affair. Karen is also seen, after discovering Navidson's furtive exploration of the hallway, to have momentarily given in to one of the exploration crew's advances.

During the explorations, with Navidson lost in the maze for days, Karen is seen to have confronted this loss and is said to have overcome her dependency on him, finally making good on her ultimatum to depart with their children. Afterwards, while separated, Karen produced a short film focused on her relationship with Navidson, which led to her returning to Virginia in search of him.

Zampanò's text emphasizes Karen's psychological state well beyond the scope of the film. Zampanò cites research and medical records as evidence that Karen radically transformed her personality while in high school to become indifferent and aloof, and also that Karen suffered from chronic claustrophobia.

==== Tom Navidson ====
Tom is described as Navidson's fraternal twin, the two brothers once being close but estranged for eight years for unknown reasons. A handyman by trade, Tom is said to be a contented underachiever with no fixed residence or attachments, as well as a recovering alcoholic. He is also described as comical and well-liked by all his acquaintances, in contrast to Navidson's cold professionalism. Much of this information is attributed to a supposed 900-page scholarly treatise analyzing the Navidson brothers as parallels to the Biblical brothers Esau and Jacob. Zampanò's text includes an entire chapter extending this analysis, but most of the text is destroyed without explanation.

Arriving at the house to help Navidson measure its dimensions, Tom is said to have improved the family's relationships and mood during his presence. Tom extended his stay to assist in the hallway explorations and subsequent rescue, in which he camped alone for days in the maze to maintain radio contact, built an improvised pulley to assist in the rescue, and, ultimately, saved the Navidsons' daughter from the house at the cost of his own life.

==== Billy Reston ====
Billy Reston is described as an African-American engineering professor at the University of Virginia, rendered paraplegic by a construction site accident near Hyderabad. Reston is said to be a longtime friend of Navidson, who photographed the very moment of Reston's accident.

Intellectually engrossed by the anomalies of the house, Reston capably helped Navidson in measuring the house, organizing the explorations, and even rescuing the explorers, journeying through the maze himself despite his disability.

==== Holloway Roberts ====
Holloway Roberts is described as an accomplished professional hunter and explorer, contacted by Reston to lead the explorations in Navidson's place. Roberts and Navidson were said to have developed a rivalry on first meeting, Roberts coveting Navidson's success and fame, and Navidson resenting relinquishing his discovery to another. Over several explorations, Roberts, accompanied by assistants Kirby "Wax" Hook and Jed Leeder, found the spiral staircase but could not reach the bottom after many hours.

In "Exploration #4", an expedition planned to last over a week, Roberts exhaustively provisioned his team, and also brought a gun. On their return after reaching the bottom of the staircase, they found their own caches of supplies vandalized by unknown causes. Believing an unseen creature roamed the maze, Roberts set out to hunt it, imperiling the team's return journey. When he accidentally shot Hook, Roberts began hunting his own team to cover up his crime, ultimately killing Leeder.

After Navidson and Reston rescued Hook, Navidson found Roberts' camera, which recorded footage of his final moments: lost and alone, with no supplies, Roberts ranted about the unseen creature he believed to be stalking him. Roberts then shot himself in an attempt to end his own life, but due to the location of the gunshot wound took around 3 minutes to pass out, the camera captured shadows abruptly extinguishing the light of Roberts' remaining flare to seemingly consume his body once he was dead. The text cites extensive academic debate stirred by the mystery of this footage.

== Format ==
Danielewski wrote the book by hand and revised it with a word processor. He then flew to Pantheon's New York headquarters to do the typesetting himself in QuarkXPress because he only trusted himself with the book's vision.

The book contains copious footnotes, many of which contain footnotes themselves, including references to fictional books, films, or articles.

=== Text color changes ===
House of Leaves includes frequent and seemingly systematic color changes. While Danielewski leaves much of the interpretation of the choice of colors up to the reader, several distinct patterns emerge upon closer examination.

Examples include:

- The word "house" is colored blue. In many places throughout the book, it is offset from the rest of the text in different directions at different times. Foreign-language equivalents of house, such as the German Haus and the French maison, are also blue. These colorizations even extend to the Random House publishing information on the book's copyright page and back cover.
- In all colored editions, the word minotaur and all struckthrough passages are colored red.
- The phrase "A Novel" on the book's cover appears in purple. The phrase "First Edition" on the copyright page appears in struckthrough purple. The phrase "what I'm remembering now" appears in struckthrough purple in Chapter XXI.

=== Typeface changes ===
Throughout the book, various changes in typeface serve as a way for the reader to quickly determine which of its multiple narrators’ work they are currently following. In the book, there are four typefaces used by the four narrators: Times New Roman (Zampanò), Courier (Johnny), Bookman (The Editors), and Kennerley (Johnny's mother). (Additional type changes are used intermittently—Janson for film intertitles, Book Antiqua for a letter written by Navidson, and so on.)

== Companion works ==
The book was followed by a companion piece called The Whalestoe Letters, a series of letters written to the character Johnny Truant by his mother while she was confined in a mental institution. Some (but not all) of the letters are included in the second edition.

House of Leaves was accompanied by a companion piece (or vice versa), a full-length album called Haunted recorded by Danielewski's sister, Anne Danielewski, known professionally as Poe. The two works cross-pollinated heavily over the course of their creations, each inspiring the other in various ways. Poe's statement on the connection between the two works is that they are parallax views of the same story. House of Leaves refers to Poe and her songs several times, not only limited to her album Haunted, but Hello as well. One example occurs when the character Karen Green is interviewing various academics on their interpretations of the short film "Exploration #4"; she consults a "Poet," but there is a space between the "Poe" and the "t," suggesting that Poe at one point commented on the book. It may also be a reference to Edgar Allan Poe.

The album Haunted also draws heavily from the novel, featuring tracks called "House of Leaves", "Exploration B" and "5&½ Minute Hallway", and many less obvious references. The video for "Hey Pretty" also features Mark Danielewski reading from House of Leaves (pp. 88–89), and in House of Leaves, the band Liberty Bell's lyrics were also songs on Poe's album.

In 2017, Danielewski entered talks to adapt the novel into a TV series, stating that if a deal was not made by February 2020, the project would be abandoned. On June 18, 2018, Danielewski released the TV pilot script in the House of Leaves book club on Facebook. Ultimately, Danielewski published screenplays of three episodes online.

A sequel to the book, the screenplays both adapt the original story and extend it to the present day. Past sequences, depicted as filmed by a then-young filmmaker named Mélisande Avignon, contradict the book significantly: Zampanò's work, found by Truant, was not a manuscript but the actual film footage of The Navidson Record. This and Avignon's film are later seized, and public knowledge of them suppressed, by a "data disposal" company called Skiadyne. In the present, unknown forces steal both films from Skiadyne and return them to Avignon, leading to a high-stakes fight for control. The book House of Leaves, now academically studied as a work of fiction, becomes embroiled in a "fake fiction" scandal when Avignon publicizes its factual basis by leaking the films.

== Reception ==
Steven Poole, writing in The Guardian, admired the book and interpreted it as a parody of academia: "Danielewski . . . weaves around his brutally efficient and genuinely chilling story a delightful and often very funny satire of academic criticism." Steven Moore, writing in The Washington Post, also praised the novel: "Danielewski's achievement lies in taking some staples of horror fiction – the haunted house, the mysterious manuscript that casts a spell on its hapless reader – and using his impressive erudition to recover the mythological and psychological origins of horror, and then enlisting the full array of avant-garde literary techniques to reinvigorate a genre long abandoned to hacks." The Village Voice's Emily Barton was less impressed: "Danielewski’s bloated and bollixed first novel certainly attempts to pass itself off as an ambitious work; the question for each reader is if the payoff makes the effort of slogging through its endless posturing worthwhile." Scholar David Letzler identified the book as an encyclopedic novel, drawing on the faux-academic writing conventions and narrative "cruft" of David Foster Wallace's Infinite Jest in particular.

A 2013 New York Times article featured a conversation between Stephen King and his son, Joe Hill, and made reference to the novel:

Joe and Stephen were having another typical conversation: hashing out what novel could be considered the Moby-Dick of horror. 'That one with all the footnotes, they argued – no, not that one, the other one: Mark Danielewski's House of Leaves.'

== Legacy ==
Writing for Bloody Disgusting, critic Luis H.C. said that House of Leaves "redefined modern horror", citing its influence in the found footage film genre; even before publication the book was the subject of frequent online discussion, and likely served as a source of inspiration for Daniel Myrick and Eduardo Sánchez in their creation of The Blair Witch Project, which released a year prior to House of Leaves. Luis H.C. also cited the book's influence in films such as YellowBrickRoad, Grave Encounters and Skinamarink, online horror stories such as Ted the Caver and Dionaea House, collaborative online creepypastas such as the Backrooms, the SCP Foundation, and Slender Man, and video games such as Alan Wake and Control. He further wrote that concepts pioneered in the novel have become ubiquitous in 21st-century horror to the point that many works, such as the web series Backrooms by Kane Parsons and its A24 film adaptation, share many similarities with House of Leaves even if the creators may not have actually read the book itself. Other works cited as being indirectly influenced by the book include films like Monster House, You Should Have Left, and Dave Made a Maze.

House of Leaves served as one of the prime inspirations for MyHouse.wad, a Doom II mod revolving around a house that is constantly shifting and changing in unsettling ways, making frequent use of impossible spaces. The mod was released in March 2023. Critic Jacob Geller posited the book as an inspiration behind the video games Anatomy and Control, citing its reimagining of an innocuous family home as an ancient, malicious entity. Critic Terry Mesnard noted that the 2020 horror film You Should Have Left seemingly took heavy inspiration from House of Leaves.

== Sources ==
- Danielewski, Mark Z. (March 7, 2000), House of Leaves (2nd ed.), New York: Pantheon Books, Random House ISBN 0375703764 paperback. ISBN 0-375-42052-5 hardcover. ISBN 0-375-41034-1 hardcover/signed.
