= Lost In Cult =

UK-based video game company

- Industry: Video games; Book publishing
- Founded: 2020; 6 years ago
- Founder: Jon Doyle
- Area served: Worldwide
- Key people: Benjamin Hayhoe (CEO); Chris Schilling (editorial director); Ryan Brown (head of publishing)
- Website: www.lostincult.co.uk

Lost In Cult is a UK-based video game design collective and book publisher. The company was founded in 2020. It produces books on video game history and design, gaming journals, board games, and vinyls.

The company's Editions label releases physical video games that include extras such as posters and essays.

== History ==
Lost in Cult was founded in 2020, by Jon Doyle. Doyle met the studio's CEO, Benjamin Hayhoe, whilst they worked at the magazine Switch Player.

== Products ==
Many Lost In Cult products are limited edition.

=== Books ===
In April 2023, Lost In Cult's first crowdfunded book, A Handheld History was announced. The book covers the history of handheld game consoles. It was released in October 2023, and praised for its "new and personalised perspective". In April 2024, the studio announced The Console Chronicles, a series of essays on the history of console gaming. It was created in collaboration with Time Extension, sponsored by The Embracer Games Archive, and released on October 1, 2024. In August 2024, the studio announced Kill the Past, a book on the history of the studio Grasshopper Manufacture. The book was released in mid-2025, and includes interviews with Suda51 and Shinji Mikami. In July 2025, the studio released Joysticks To Haptics, a book on the history of video game controllers.

In March 2024, YouTuber Jacob Geller announced How a Game Lives, a book of essays published in collaboration with Lost In Cult. A second book titled You're Not Overthinking It was planned. In October 2026, Geller publicly admitted to sexual assault. In response, Lost In Cult removed the books from sale, and stated that it would no longer work with him.

=== Design Works ===
The studio's Design Works series includes books on video game design, and vinyl records of game soundtracks. It has produced books for Mundaun and Sable.

In May 2023, Lost in Cult announced fundraising for a Citizen Sleeper Design Works artbook.

In September 2024, the company announced Outer Wilds: Design Works. The deluxe edition included items such as a papercraft model, posters, and stickers.

In April 2025, the company announced Immortality: Design Works. It was the company's largest book, at almost 600 pages. The book covers the creation of Immortality, and of the three films produced for it. It uses thermo-reactive-ink and differing page sizes to reflect the game's themes.

In May 2025, the company announced a book on the creation of Animal Well, which released in 2026. In August 2025, the company announced a book on the history of Alan Wake.

=== Lock On ===
Lost In Cult creates Lock-On gaming journals, which include essays and artwork. The project began in 2021. The first volume was funded through a Kickstarter campaign, and focused on PlayStation consoles.

=== Board games ===
In October 2025, Lost In Cult announced its first board game, an adaptation of Phasmophobia.

In March 2026, it was announced that Lost In Cult was adapting World of Horror into a card-based board game. Shintaro Kago, Noroi Michiru, Kanafuro Taro, and Cojima Miyako worked on the art for the deluxe edition.

=== Vinyls ===
In April 2025, Lost in Cult announced Kenji Eno 55: Soundworks, a box set of vinyls dedicated to the Japanese musician and designer Kenji Eno. It includes fifty-five tracks, on seven discs.

== Labels ==
=== Editions ===
In late 2023, Lost in Cult began work on Editions, a physical game label which releases editions of games that include physical extras such as posters and essays. The label focuses on preserving indie games.

Editions was announced in May 2025. The first releases were Immortality, Thank Goodness You're Here!, and The Excavation of Hob's Barrow. Only a few thousand copies of each game were released. Other 2025 releases were Paper Trail, Arco, Norco, and Promise Mascot Agency. In July 2025, Lost In Cult announced the publication of a physical edition of Animal Well. Derek Yu created art for the project.

The studio planned to release one game per month until July 2026. The games were sold in mass retail and premium editions. Retail editions are available online and in physical shops, whilst premium editions are only available though Lost In Cult's website.

The games can be played without internet access. Lost In Cult partnered with DoesItPlay?, a game preservation group, which tested the games for offline functionality.

Editions has been compared to The Criterion Collection.

Marketing director Ryan Brown is also the head of Editions.

=== Everything Not Saved ===
In May 2023, Lost In Cult launched "Everything Not Saved", a label that preserves video game culture.

== Awards ==
Year	Organisation	Category	Nominee/work	Result	Ref.
2023	MCV/Develop Awards	Newcomer of the Year	Lost In Cult	Won	
