= Only Revolutions =

2006 novel by Mark Z. Danielewski

- Author: Mark Z. Danielewski
- Language: English
- Genre: Fiction, Road Trip
- Publisher: Pantheon Books
- Publication date: 12 September 2006
- Publication place: United States
- Media type: Print (Hardcover)
- Pages: 360
- ISBN: 0-375-42176-9
- OCLC: 64427527
- Dewey Decimal: 813/.54 22
- LC Class: PS3554.A5596 O55 2006
- Preceded by: The Fifty Year Sword
- Followed by: The Familiar, Volume 1: One Rainy Day in May

Only Revolutions is an American road novel by American writer Mark Z. Danielewski. It was released in the United States on September 12, 2006 by Pantheon Books. It was a finalist for the 2006 National Book Award for Fiction.

== Writing ==
Danielewski has said that he wanted the book to be confusing "beyond what [he] can digest." The working title of the novel was "THAT".

== Plot summary ==
The story alternates between two different narratives: Sam and Hailey, and Hailey and Sam, wild and wayward teenagers who never grow old. With an evolving stable of cars, the teenagers move through various places and moments in time as they try to outrace history.

As the story proceeds, one can note that many events are perceptual and not certain. By reading both stories some sense can be made from this poetic styled puzzle. The words written are a vague mix of poetry and stream of consciousness prose. Both Hailey and Sam depict their feelings as well as ideas and thoughts towards one another.

== Reception ==
Critical reception for Only Revolutions has been divided, with many reviewers commenting that the book's appeal would greatly depend on the reader. In a review for The Guardian, Steven Poole praised Only Revolutions and wrote "The book is to be admired for its sheer zest for invention, the kind of faith in ambitious literature so rare among contemporary novelists. And though it can often be baffling and tiresome, it also has enough flashes of expressionistic brilliance and sustained deliriums of invention to justify the reach." In contrast, Sean O'Hagan criticized the book as being "dense and overly-complicated" and commented that "There is enough experimentation here to keep academics and cyber-geeks satisfied for years to come, but long before the end—wherever that is—I was left longing for the lull and sway of a classic tale well told."
