= Familiarity =

Familiarity is knowledge, awareness or understanding of someone or something, such as facts, information, descriptions, or skills, which is acquired through experience or education by perceiving, discovering, or learning.

It may also refer to:

- Familiarity heuristic
- Familiarity principle
- Intimate relationship

== See also ==
- Familiar (disambiguation)
- Fame (disambiguation)
