= Kitty Horrorshow =

Independent video game developer

- Occupation: Video game developer
- Notable work: CHYRZA; Anatomy; Haunted Cities

Kitty Horrorshow is the pseudonym of an independent video game developer. Releasing her games on the distribution platform itch.io, she specializes in the psychological horror genre, with her games focusing on surreal and atmospheric horror in the aesthetic style of early 3D video games.

== Career and style ==
Though Horrorshow wanted to become a game developer when she was younger, her initial attempts led her to abandon game development, finding it too complex, leading her to focus on creative writing instead. Several years later, Horrorshow became interested in game development once again after playing Arcadia by Jonas Kyratzes, made using Twine, an interactive story creation piece of software.

Horrorshow's art style is influenced by early 3D video games, such as Doom, Hexen: Beyond Heretic, Thief: The Dark Project, and EverQuest, citing their ability to create immersive worlds while still remaining unmistakably computer-generated. In an interview with Boing Boing, Horrorshow explained that the world of Silent Hill served as "more of a home" than anything she had experienced in reality, and that the works of Porpentine had greatly changed her outlook on video games.

Owen Vince of Kill Screen compared the stylistic, low-polygon graphics in Horrorshow's games to the aesthetics of German Expressionism, specifically The Cabinet of Dr. Caligari. Her games often lack characters with whom to interact, but focus instead on dreamlike scenes to explore. Horrorshow avoids jump scares and player character death, explaining in an interview with Slate that she found them uninteresting, instead using elements of psychological horror, such as leaving disturbing scenes unexplained and open to interpretation, to scare players. Commenting on the lack of jump scares in Horrorshow's games, Brendan Caldwell of Rock, Paper, Shotgun wrote, "These games creep up on you slowly and rattle your brain, not your instincts."

In 2017, Horrorshow was one of four game creators featured at the "No Quarter" exhibition hosted by the New York University Game Center.

== Games ==
=== CHYRZA ===
Originally published in October 2014, CHYRZA is a game about exploring a vast desert populated with large monoliths that surround a deserted village. A narrator describes the scenes, but in the first person voice of a traveler in the desert, detailing their disturbing encounters and backgrounds. Fears around a large pyramid that continuously looms in the distance is also repeatedly referenced. The structures found throughout the desert have their sources revealed to the player by the narrator when reaching the top of each one in an increasingly paranoid and unhinged manner.

Chris Priestman of Kill Screen compared the atmosphere to The Twilight Zone's debut episode titled "Where Is Everybody?", saying it evoked the "feeling of being watched and isolated" and being slowly driven mad by the delusional psychosis. Rock, Paper, Shotgun's Philippa Warr compared the setting to one of the bizarre news items that could be found in the fictional narrative podcast Welcome to Night Vale, especially one event where a "mysterious philosophical pyramid" arrives at the town.

=== Anatomy ===
Released in 2016, Anatomy is a game focused on exploring an empty house and finding voice tapes within it as the house begins to change around the player. Initially, collecting these tapes is the only component of the game, but the program eventually glitches and closes itself; when reopened, the house has changed radically, with static on the game screen and audio distortion occurring. These shutdown events are repeated as the house continues to degrade more and more upon continued playing of the game.

Rock, Paper, Shotgun's Steven Messner described Anatomy as "the rare kind of game that exploits our comforts — chiefly the feeling of being safe at home". Wired writer Julie Muncy described the game as "[pushing] you to think about why scary things are scary, what deeper psychology is at work when you're afraid of the dark room at the end of the hall or what might be behind that locked door." Jacob Geller for Game Informer described Anatomy as the "scariest game I've ever played" and that the lo-fi nature of the graphics and audio contributed significantly to the game's experience. Playboy's Suriel Vazquez commended the game for not relying on monsters and jump scares, leaving it "anything but predictable".

Adam Smith of Rock, Paper, Shotgun referenced the Lovecraftian quote "fear of the unknown", reinterpreting it for Anatomy as "fear of the familiar", whereby even familiar spaces can seem frightening in the dark and the quiet of night. Writing for PC Gamer, Steven Messner discussed how the cultural shared experiences of quarantine during the COVID-19 pandemic heighten the disturbing nature of Anatomy and increase the sinister nature of everyday household objects. He stated that he loved how the game "takes the simple pleasures of a life spent indoors and forces you to see it as something to fear". In a quest to find a game that evokes "true terror", Tom Faber in Financial Times decided that Anatomy was ultimately that game, concluding that the inscrutable nature of the house was what made it terrifying and that what's "scarier than a monster operating as a metaphor is a monster that refuses to mean anything at all".

=== Haunted Cities ===
==== Volume 1 ====
Through funding from her Patreon, Horrorshow released collections of games under the "Haunted Cities" package, centred around the theme of virtual spaces and the potential for the disturbing nature of architecture and topography. The original release bundle included games officially published between November 2015 and February 2016. The games in the first volume of Haunted Cities included Leechbowl, featuring an abandoned midwestern factory town with an obsession with blood, Grandmother, a visit to a grandmother's house in a dark forest, Pente, an empty cathedral and the theme of suffering, and Circadia, a story made in Flash about "a girl trying to cure a cassette tape's infection".

==== Volume 2 ====
One of the games presented in the second volume is Scarlet Bough, which features an abandoned small town where each building hides gory secrets. Matt Cox of Rock, Paper, Shotgun pointed out that the game exhibited Horrorshow's stated design ethos of starting with the simple idea of a space and then populating it afterwards, commenting that the use of environmental storytelling and appropriate sounds helped to heighten the atmosphere.

==== Volume 3 ====
The third volume of the series included four games called Ghost Lake, Seven Days, Basements, and Castle Wormclot. A content warning for each game is included in the ReadMe file. The first game, Ghost Lake, involves driving a car around a decaying, abandoned city with disturbing imagery of rotting and breaking down buildings. Seven Days reflects several past games released by Horrorshow, by featuring the strange environment of a house undamaged by a storm and a flood that has destroyed the rest of the town. The player follows the occupant's diary on each day in the decaying location. Basements is a shorter game with more graphic and sensory-focused imagery about loss and the nature of humanity.

Unlike many of the other games in the package that have a greater focus on overt horror, Castle Wormclot features the subdued presentation of a candlekeeper wandering a castle to light candles in a slow and methodical manner, so others in the castle can travel those same paths. The lives of the other characters in and around the castle is shown alongside their fears and worries about what is happening inside the castle. Cameron Kunzelman of Vice compared the game to the plodding horror of political life in 2018 in their home state of Georgia, and having to wait for the voted-upon results of the election to be announced, though with everything potentially collapsing in the meantime.

== Works ==
- Stygia (September 2012)
- Stygia II: The Sisters of Stygia (February 2013)
- The Cradle of Eve (March 2013)
- Dust City (August 2014)
- Chyrza (October 2014)
- Here Is Where I Carve My Heart (March 2015)
- Sunset Spirit Steel (March 2015)
- Hornets (April 2015)
- Sigil Valley (April 2015)
- Wolfgirls In Love (April 2015)
- Rain, House, Eternity (May 2015)
- Actias (November 2015)
- Anatomy (February 2016)
- 000000FF0000 (May 2016)
- Haunted Cities (May 2016)
- Haunted Cities Vol. 2 (October 2017)
- Haunted Cities Vol. 3 (October 2018)
- Haunted Cities Vol. 4 (October 2020)

== Personal life ==
Horrorshow grew up in a self-described upper middle class household that was extremely intolerant toward minority groups and people outside what was considered normal in the suburban area. Due to this, she repressed discussing her transgender identity around her family, and it was only later in life when she began studying the practice of witchcraft and the usage of rituals that she became more accepting of herself. Her spiritual beliefs also expressed themselves in music and writing and were a primary impetus that led to her video game making career.
