= MinnMax =

Online entertainment company

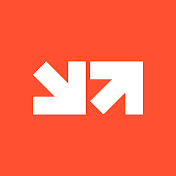
- Industry: Entertainment
- Genre: Video games; Comedy; Media criticism; Self-improvement; Music
- Founded: October 24, 2019; 6 years ago
- Founders: Ben Hanson; Kyle Hilliard; Suriel Vazquez; Jeff Marchiafava
- Headquarters: Minneapolis, Minnesota, U.S.
- Key people: Ben Hanson; Haley MacLean; Kyle Hilliard; Kelsey Lewin; Jeff Marchiafava; Janet Garcia; Leo Vader; Sarah Podzorski
- Services: Podcast; Online video; Virtual community; Livestreaming
- Website: minnmax.com

MinnMax is an online entertainment company based in Minnesota that focuses on "games, friends, and getting better". MinnMax's flagship content is the weekly video podcast The MinnMax Show, which focuses on video game reviews and previews, industry news, and community questions. The company's output also includes live-streamed personality-driven videos, interviews with professionals in various fields, and documentaries. The company is led by Ben Hanson, one of four founding members and host of The MinnMax Show, with a rotating cast of cohorts, contributors, and friends of MinnMax additionally contributing to the content. The company is crowdfunded via Patreon, with different contribution tiers offering various incentives, such as receiving the weekly podcast a day early.

== History and operations ==
In August 2019, Game Informer laid off a number of their editorial staff. Ben Hanson, host of The Game Informer Show podcast at the time, was not included in the layoffs, but became disillusioned with working for a large corporation like GameStop and left the company several months later. On 24 October 2019, the same day Hanson left Game Informer, he launched MinnMax as a Patreon along with Kyle Hilliard, Suriel Vazquez, and Jeff Marchiafava, all of whom had been laid off by Game Informer in August. The stated goal was to create a sustainable, supporter-funded video game media outlet with a larger focus on video content and community-building. By receiving funding directly from supporters via Patreon, the company was specifically designed not to be beholden to corporate interests.

In addition to their flagship podcast, The MinnMax Show, a key part of MinnMax's initial pitch to supporters was game club-style content called The Deepest Dive. The first Deepest Dive discussed The Outer Worlds over multiple episodes, with community members writing in with comments and questions about the game. MinnMax has continued to use this format, even expanding outside of video games for The Deepest Dive on The Thing franchise.

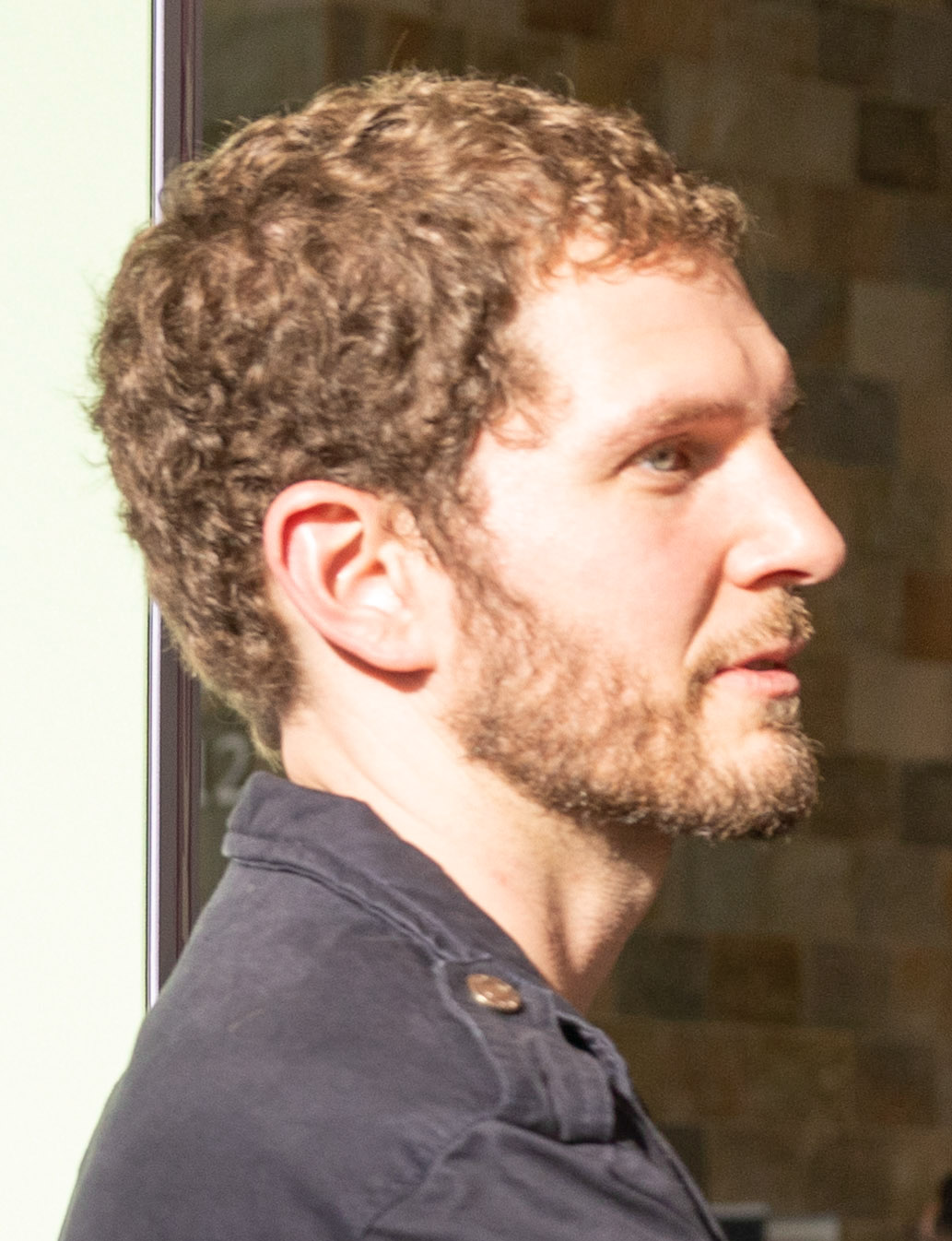
MinnMax co-founder Ben Hanson in March 2024

On 10 August 2020, Hanson interviewed former Visceral Games developers Zach Mumbach and Ben Wander, leading several video game websites to report details about a canceled Star Wars game, Project Ragtag, that came to light in the interview. This started a trend of details from MinnMax interviews being picked up by notable media outlets, including information about Fall Guys, Wii U, WWE, God of War Ragnarök, and more.

On 16 October 2020, MinnMax released Trailheads: The Oregon Trail's Origins Documentary, which received attention from both video game and local news outlets. The documentary was a project Hanson started in 2009 "while working for a community television station in Roseville," with most of the featured footage having been captured years before its release. MinnMax has continued interest in documentaries, also producing The Oral History of PopCap Games, which released on 5 April 2021, and hosting a recurring event called "Doc Lightning", featuring documentaries submitted by community members.

Every month beginning in February 2021, MinnMax live streams a video game trivia show called Trivia Tower, open to all members of the Patreon to play as contestants. Notably, MinnMax has hosted two special editions called Trivia Tower All-Stars, which brings together various members of the video game media to compete instead of Patreon members, with 100% of the prize going to the winner's charity of choice. Similarly, MinnMax has hosted several special editions of Trivia Tower in collaboration with other media outlets, which include stakes based on which community wins.

Every November since 2020, MinnMax has hosted a charity livestream. They initially participated in Extra Life, a fundraising event for the Children's Miracle Network Hospitals. Besides the MinnMax staff, these streams have included collaborations with former MinnMax collaborators, current and former Game Informer staff, and Easy Allies creators. In 2023, MinnMax instead participated in "Give to the Max", benefitting the nonprofit Connections to Independence.

Since 2022, MinnMax has been included in the voting jury of The Game Awards.

In October 2026, amidst resurfaced allegations of sexual misconduct, MinnMax announced that Jacob Geller was no longer a member of their staff and would no longer be featured in their content moving forward.

== Name ==
The company's name references the practice of min-maxing in video games, as well as Minnesota, the company's primary state of operations. The two Ns in MinnMax are frequently noted in the outlet's content, with even their game of the year list, The Two Tens, referencing the letters. Furthermore, some of the company's content riffs are on the name, such as MinnFAQs, MinnSnax, and Max Spoilers.

== Games of the year ==
Each year, MinnMax produces special episodes of the podcast called The MinnMax Awards. In these episodes, specific category awards are chosen, such as "Best Thing" and "Greatest Work of Art of All Time". Furthermore, a list known as The Two Tens ranks the ten best games of the year (the first ten), as well as the next ten best games of the year (the second ten). Below are the games MinnMax has listed as number one on the first ten each year.

Year	Game
2019	Resident Evil 2
2020	Final Fantasy VII Remake
2021	Chicory: A Colorful Tale
2022	Elden Ring
2023	Baldur's Gate 3
2024	Astro Bot
2025	Clair Obscur: Expedition 33

== Recurring shows ==
The following table lists most of MinnMax's recurring shows, in order of their first appearance.

Title	Description	First Appearance	Status
The MinnMax Show	Flagship podcast discussing video game news and answering community questions.	26 October 2019	On-going
MinnFAQs	Q&A show answering community questions from a live chat.	28 October 2019	Ended 1 February 2021; Replaced by MinnMax Council
The Great GOTY Hunt	Livestream playing games from within the last year.	29 October 2019	Ended 27 January 2021; Sometimes returns on New Show Plus
The Deepest Dive	Game club series discussing games and other media in great detail.	30 October 2019	On-going
Max Spoilers	Spoiler discussion of media, usually a new movie, TV show, or video game.	12 November 2019	On-going
MinnSnax	Suriel Vazquez tries various foods.	27 November 2019	Ended 28 February 2020; Appeared in 2nd Anniversary Celebration on 23 October 2021
Tabletop Game Night (Original)	Livestreams of a group playing a tabletop game in person.	6 December 2019	Ended 13 February 2020
CrossFade	Matt Helgeson and a guest discuss two albums, one chosen by each. Formerly known as MinnTrax.	2 March 2020	Ended 30 December 2022 (indefinite hiatus)
Photomode Snap	MinnMax staff rate community-submitted video game screenshots.	3 April 2020	Ended 12 June 2020; Has returned for some special episodes
BetterQuest	Community-focused podcast about "getting better" by setting monthly goals. Hosted by Ben Hanson and Jeff Cork.	29 May 2020	Ended 6 January 2022
Refreshed	Ana Diaz interviews a guest about internet culture.	29 June 2020	Ended 4 December 2020
Watch Later	Video game-focused video essays by Leo Vader.	31 July 2020	Ended 26 February 2021
New Show Plus	Weekly livestream featuring a format voted upon by Patreon supporters. The previous week's format is always included as an option in the vote.	3 February 2021	On-going
MinnMax Council	Weekly call-in type show exclusively for Patreon supporters. Replaced MinnFAQs.	8 February 2021	Ended 24 January 2022; Replaced by Party Chat
Trivia Tower	Monthly video game trivia competition. All Patreon supporters can participate through Discord.	16 February 2021	On-going
Party Chat	Weekly show using a Discord "Stage" for discussion with Patreon supporters. Replaced MinnMax Council.	31 January 2022	Ended 8 January 2024; Replaced by Bonus Pod
Cream of the Steam	Explores little-known games published to Steam that month. Hosted by Sarah Podzorski, with Ana Diaz usually appearing as the guest. Formerly known as Steam's Secret Stash.	9 February 2022	On-going
Ana's Internet Cafe	Ana Diaz and a guest interact with a live stream chat while discussing internet culture. Spiritual Successor to Refreshed.	10 August 2022	Ended 14 December 2022
New Show Overflow	Occasional livestream featuring a format that was lost in some previous New Show Plus polls. MinnMax staff choose the format instead of Patreon supporters.	17 August 2022	On-going
Tabletop Game Night (Revival)	Tabletop game-focused livestreams.	24 August 2022	Ended 16 November 2022
Collector Corner	Kelsey Lewin of the Video Game History Foundation shows off the video game collections of community members and other guests.	23 September 2022	Ended 2 December 2022
Better Together	MinnMax staff play multiplayer games with community members.	3 August 2022	Ended 2 November 2022
Bonus Pod	Weekly bonus podcast hosted by Haley MacLean. Although it replaced Party Chat, the community call-in aspect has been de-emphasized.	15 January 2024	On-going
Pew Pew Bang	Bi-weekly podcast hosted by Kelsey Lewin, Haley MacLean, Sarah Podzorski, and Janet Garcia discussing the video game industry and offering life advice from a female perspective.	17 February 2025	On-going

=== Deepest Dives ===
The following table lists all of MinnMax's Deepest Dives, in the order they were released.

	Topic	Episode Count	First Episode Date	Panel	Ref
1	The Outer Worlds	3	30 October 2019	Ben Hanson, Kyle Hilliard, Jeff Marchiafava, and Suriel Vazquez	
2	Chrono Trigger	3	22 January 2020	Ben Hanson, Kyle Hilliard, Jeff Marchiafava, and Suriel Vazquez	
3	Animal Crossing: New Horizons	3	25 March 2020	Ben Hanson, Ana Diaz, Sarah Podzorski, and Kelsey Lewin	
4	Final Fantasy VII Remake	5	15 April 2020	Ben Hanson, Kyle Hilliard, Jeff Marchiafava, Grant, and Ronnie	
5	What Remains of Edith Finch	1	10 June 2020	Ben Hanson, Ana Diaz, Marcus Stewart, and Jacob Geller	
6	The Last of Us Part II	4	24 June 2020	Ben Hanson, Jeff Marchiafava, Suriel Vazquez, and Charles McGregor	
7	Halo: Combat Evolved	3	12 August 2020	Ben Hanson, Kyle Hilliard, Jeff Marchiafava, and Suriel Vazquez	
8	Super Mario 64	3	25 September 2020	Ben Hanson, Ana Diaz, Dan Ryckert, and Ronnie	
9	The Thing franchise	3	21 October 2020	Ben Hanson, Leo Vader, Mike Mahardy, and Javy Gwaltney	
10	Spider-Man: Miles Morales	2	18 November 2020	Ben Hanson, Ana Diaz, Kyle Hilliard, and Kyle Bosman	
11	Cyberpunk 2077	4	18 December 2020	Ben Hanson, Suriel Vazquez, Leo Vader, and Jeff Marchiafava	
12	Batman: Arkham Asylum	2	10 March 2021	Ben Hanson, Kyle Hilliard, Bryan Vore, and Brandon Jones	
13	Mass Effect	3	19 May 2021	Ben Hanson, Leo Vader, Joe Juba, and Sarah Elmaleh	
14	Final Fantasy VII Remake Intermission	1	23 June 2021	Ben Hanson, Kyle Hilliard, Grant, and Ronnie	
15	Dead Space (2008)	2	28 July 2021	Ben Hanson, Kyle Hilliard, Jacob Geller, Kate Sanchez, and Zach Mumbach	
16	Metroid Dread	2	13 October 2021	Ben Hanson, Janet Garcia, Kyle Hilliard, and Joe Juba	
17	Halo Infinite	2	14 December 2021	Ben Hanson, Kyle Hilliard, Jeff Marchiafava, Suriel Vazquez, and Wade Wojcik	
18	Pokémon Legends: Arceus	2	2 February 2022	Ben Hanson, Sarah Podzorski, Janet Garcia, and Kelsey Lewin	
19	Chrono Cross	4	13 April 2022	Ben Hanson, Kyle Hilliard, Joe Juba, and Rebekah Valentine	
20	Jak and Daxter: The Precursor Legacy	2	15 July 2022	Ben Hanson, Jeff Marchiafava, Janet Garcia, Charles McGregor, and Ryan Biniecki	
21	Indiana Jones and the Fate of Atlantis	2	13 September 2022	Ben Hanson, Leo Vader, Bryan Vore, and Ross Pfund	
22	God of War Ragnarök	3	17 November 2022	Ben Hanson, Suriel Vazquez, Jill Grodt, and Kyle Bosman	
23	Like a Dragon: Ishin!	3	1 March 2023	Leo Vader, Jacob Geller, Sarah Podzorski and Michael Higham	
24	Resident Evil 4 (2023)	3	28 March 2023	Ben Hanson, Sarah Podzorski, Kyle Hilliard, and Jeff Marchiafava	
25	The Legend of Zelda: Tears of the Kingdom	4	15 May 2023	Ben Hanson, Kelsey Lewin, Leo Vader, Jeff Marchiafava, Jacob Geller, Kyle Hilliard, Haley MacLean, and Jenna Stoeber	
26	Armored Core VI: Fires of Rubicon	3	28 August 2023	Jacob Geller, Suriel Vazquez, and Renata Price	
27	Alan Wake 2	3	26 October 2023	Ben Hanson, Sarah Podzorski, Leo Vader, Haley MacLean, and Jeff Marchiafava	
28	Final Fantasy VII Rebirth	5	27 February 2024	Ben Hanson, Grant, Ronnie, and Ross "The Star Wars Guy" Pfund	
29	Elden Ring Shadow of the Erdtree	2	26 June 2024	Jacob Geller, Sarah Podzorski, Kyle Hilliard, and Renata Price	
30	Mirror's Edge	2	9 September 2024	Leo Vader, Jacob Geller, Charles Harte, and Alex Van Aken	
31	The Legend of Zelda: Echoes of Wisdom	2	1 October 2024	Kelsey Lewin, Haley MacLean, Jeff Marchiafava, and Ben Hanson	
32	Onimusha: Warlords	2	4 February 2025	Michael Huber, Kelsey Lewin, Jacob Geller, Kyle Hilliard, and Ben Hanson	
33	Clair Obscur: Expedition 33	3	29 April 2025	Ben Hanson, Jacob Geller, Kelsey Lewin, and Haley MacLean	
34	Metal Gear Solid Delta	3	2 September 2025	Ben Hanson, Kyle Hilliard, Charles Harte, Dan Ryckert, and Haley MacLean	

=== Notable New Show Plus Series ===
The following are series that have been featured in New Show Plus three or more times, sorted by first appearance.

Title	Appearance Count
House Hunter Rise	11 (Note: Includes 2 Sunbreak episodes, 1 Haunted episode, 1 Wilds episode and 3 episodes that were produced upon reaching a Patreon goal)
The Great GOTY Hunt	3
E3 Memories	5
Bonus Podcast	5
Nintendo OnWine	5
Showdown	5
Sarah the Horse Girl	6 (Note: Includes 1 Sarah the Plane Guy episode)
We Sports	5
We Spore	3
Walking Simulator Simulator	3
Haley's Laws, Clause, and Claws	3
Thirst Council	5 (Note: Includes 1 Halloween Costume episode)
Spiciest Interview	4
Fashion Montage	3
Giant Games	3
Old Award Shows	4
Scripted Podcast	4 (Note: Includes 1 Writing And Performing The Zelda Movie episode)

== Reception ==
Pew Pew Bang, the recurring MinnMax show introduced in 2025, won the inaugural Astra Podcast Awards in the Best Game Podcast category.
