= The Fifty Year Sword =

2005 novella by Mark Z. Danielewski

- Author: Mark Z. Danielewski
- Original title: Het Vijftig Jaars Zwaard
- Cover artist: Peter van Sambeek
- Language: Dutch, English
- Genre: Short stories
- Publisher: De Bezige Bij
- Publication date: Holland edition 31 October 2005 and US edition in October 2012
- Publication place: Netherlands
- Media type: Print (Hardback)
- Pages: 100
- ISBN: 90-234-1856-5 (orig. Dutch) & ISBN 90-234-1877-8 (Eng. trans.)
- OCLC: 71707811
- Preceded by: The Whalestoe Letters
- Followed by: Only Revolutions

The Fifty Year Sword is a novella by Mark Z. Danielewski. Danielewski created the book with the Dutch artist Peter van Sambeek. The recto pages of the book are empty except for page numbers and van Sambeek's art. The Dutch publishing house De Bezige Bij published 1000 first editions on October 31, 2005, and 1000 second editions on October 31, 2006.

== Synopsis ==
Chintana, a seamstress in East Texas, finds herself responsible for five orphans who are not only captivated by a storyteller’s tale of vengeance but by the long black box he sets before them. As midnight approaches, the box is opened, a fateful dare is made, and the children as well as Chintana come face to face with the consequences of a malice retold and now foretold.

Much like Danielewski's previous works, The Fifty Year Sword uses unusual formatting and color throughout. Five different colors are used for quotation marks in order to signal which character is speaking.

== Writing ==
According to Danielewski, "The idea [for the sword] came partly from a social experience that I think most everyone has had, where you’ve been at a party...and a comment is made that you laugh about, maybe, and don’t think much of, and then a few hours later you realize: that was a really cutting remark, that really hurt... At that moment we’ve sort of felt the effects of a fifteen-minute sword. Or maybe it’s a two-hour sword. So it was that idea of delayed hurt, delayed violence." The idea for the story came a few years later, nearly fully formed. Danielewski wrote the book in a week, then spent the next year revisiting it. The concept of the stage performance had existed since the book was published.

After writing the story, Danielewski's agents weren't interested in the book, however his Dutch publisher was willing to print a limited edition. Danielewski chose van Sambeek as the illustrator when he ran into him in the airport and recognized him as his neighbor.

== Publication history ==
The Fifty Year Sword was published in both Dutch and English by publisher De Bezige Bij, but only 1,000 first edition English copies were released. 51 of those copies are signed in marker with a "Z" (varying in color and number to coincide with the 5 colored quotation marks that signify different speakers in the text), while the first copy is initialed "MZD" in standard ink, as shown in a signatures key provided by Danielewski through the original publisher. A second English edition of 1,000 was released in October 2006.

In 2012, Pantheon released a trade edition of The Fifty Year Sword including newly stitched illustrations.

== Live performance ==
In 2010, Danielewski announced that he would do a stage performance of The Fifty Year Sword, the first of which was on October 31, 2010 at the Roy and Edna Disney/CalArts Theater (REDCAT) in Los Angeles. There were two back-to-back sold-out performances that night. The production featured five people (including actress Betsy Brandt) reading the words of the five speakers in the novella, and shadow casting by Christine Marie. On October 31, 2011, Danielewski produced a slightly modified production back to back at REDCAT again. There was live music by Partch Ensemble percussionists Matthew Cook and T.J. Troy, as well as Christine Marie's shadow casting and five actors reading. The two performances were again sold out.

In 2012, the production of The Fifty Year Sword went to five cities around the United States in conjunction with the book release tour for the Pantheon trade edition. These performances, smaller in production than the REDCAT performances, featured different actors at every city, including Saturday Night Live alumnus Darrell Hammond in New York. Pianist Christopher O'Riley, a longtime friend and fan of Danielewski, also toured for these performances. The final performance of the tour, on October 31, 2012, was another back-to-back, sold-out production at REDCAT.
