= Mark Z. Danielewski =

American author (born 1966)

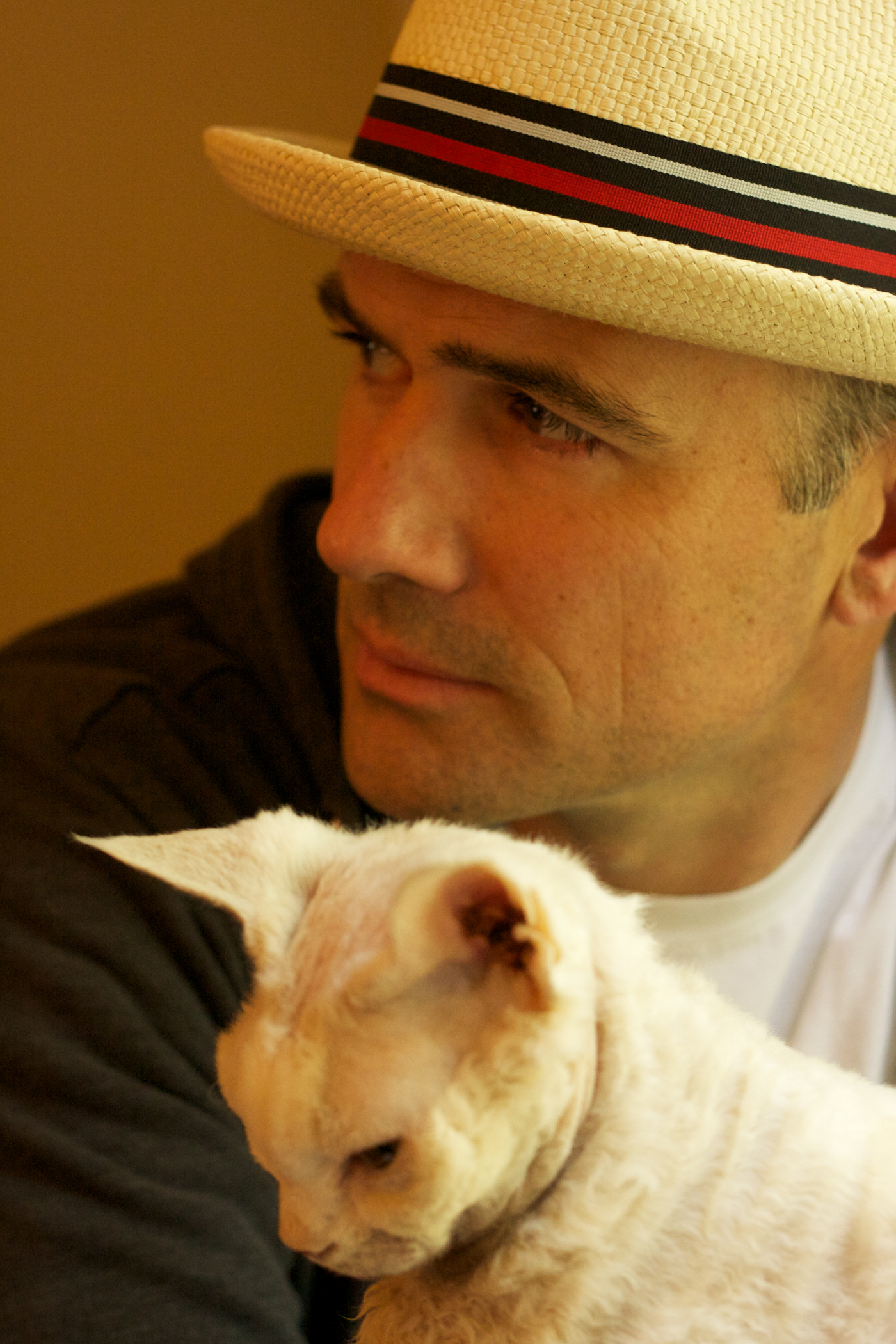
- Mark Z. Danielewski with cat Carl in 2016
- Born: March 5, 1966 (age 60); New York City, U.S.
- Education: Yale University (BA); University of Southern California (MFA)
- Occupation: Novelist
- Relatives: Tad Danielewski (father); Poe (sister)
- Writing career
- Genres: Satire, horror
- Notable works: House of Leaves, Only Revolutions, The Familiar, Volume 1: One Rainy Day in May
- Movements: Postmodern, ergodic literature, signiconic literature
- Website: markzdanielewski.com

Mark Z. Danielewski (/ˈdæniəˌlɛfski/ DAN-ee-ə-LEFF-skee; born March 5, 1966) is an American fiction author. He is most widely known for his debut novel House of Leaves (2000), which won the New York Public Library's Young Lions Fiction Award. His second novel, Only Revolutions (2006), was nominated for the National Book Award.

Danielewski began work on a 27-volume series, The Familiar, although he completed only five volumes before halting the project in 2017.

Danielewski's work is characterized by an intricate, multi-layered typographical variation, or page layout, which he refers to as "signiconic". Sometimes known as visual writing, the typographical variation corresponds directly, at any given narratological point in time, to the physical space of the events in the fictional world as well as the physical space of the page and the reader. Early on, critics characterized his writing as being ergodic literature, and Danielewski has described his style as:

Signiconic = sign + icon. Rather than engage those textual faculties of the mind remediating the pictorial or those visual faculties remediating language, the signiconic simultaneously engages both in order to lessen the significance of both and therefore achieve a third perception no longer dependent on sign and image for remediating a world in which the mind plays no part."

== Personal life ==
Danielewski was born in New York City to Tad Danielewski, a Polish avant-garde film director, and Priscilla Decatur Machold. Mark was Tad's second child and his first with Priscilla; Mark's sister Anne, also known as Poe, was born two years later. The Danielewski family moved continuously for Tad's various film projects, and by the age of 10, Mark had lived in six countries: Ghana, India, Spain, Switzerland, Britain and the United States. When he was 10 years old, the family settled in Provo, Utah, where he and his sister were brought up. Danielewski has said his family's frequent relocations in his early years helped him appreciate creativity in all its forms and showed him that "there was much to be learned out there."

In 1985 Danielewski, aged 19, visited his half-brother, who was living on Rue des Belles Feuilles in Paris. Here, he began writing on a manual typewriter and enjoying the actual process of writing for the first time. During this period he wrote a story called "Where Tigers Dance", which he has called "so unfinished it didn't deserve to be called incomplete", but has said that it continued "to roam around" in his imagination.

In 1988 Danielewski graduated from Yale with a degree in English literature; he had studied under John Hollander, Stuart Moulthrop, and John Guillory. He was also inspired by Harold Bloom. In 1989 he moved to Berkeley, California, where he enrolled in an intensive Latin course at the University of California, Berkeley. He then pursued graduate studies at the USC School of Cinema-Television in Los Angeles. During this time he became involved with Derrida, a documentary about the career and philosophy of Algerian-born French literary critic and philosopher Jacques Derrida. Danielewski was an assistant editor, sound technician and cameraman, and can be seen adjusting the sound equipment in Derrida's suit jacket at one point in the film. He graduated with an MFA in 1993, the year his father died. It was also the year he had the idea of a house bigger on the inside than the outside, an image which would become his first novel, House of Leaves.

Danielewski has been a cat lover throughout his life. Cats show up in myriad ways throughout his works and are a main topic in his series The Familiar. In January 2016, Danielewski adopted two Devon Rex kittens, Archimedes and Meifumado, after his previous Devon Rex companions, Sibyl and Carl died.

== Career ==
=== House of Leaves ===
Danielewski dates the origin of his debut novel House of Leaves to 1990 and a story that he wrote after finding out that his father was dying:

1990. My father was head of the USC School of Theater. I was living in New York. Then I got the phone call. The 'Mark your father is dying' phone call. He was in the hospital. Renal failure, cancer. I got on a Greyhound bus and headed west. Over the course of three sleepless nights and three sleepless days I wrote a 100+ page piece entitled Redwood. I remember using a fountain pen. I barely had the change to buy sodas and snacks along the way and there I am scratching out words with this absurdly expensive thing of polished resin and gold. I'd like to say it was a Pelikan, but I don't think that's correct. Another thing I seem to remember: the paper I was writing on had a pale blue cast to it. There was also something about how the pen seemed to bite into the paper at the same time as it produced these lush sweeps of ink. A kind of cutting and spilling. Almost as if a page could bleed. My intention had been to present this piece of writing as a gift to my father. As has been mentioned many times before, my father responded with the suggestions that I pursue a career at the post office. I responded by reducing the manuscript to confetti, going so far as to throw myself a pity parade in a nearby dumpster. My sister responded by returning later to that dumpster, rescuing the confetti, and taping it all back together.

Writing House of Leaves took ten years, and between 1993 and 1999, Danielewski made a living as a tutor, barista, and plumber. He eventually found a literary agent in Warren Frazier, who, according to Danielewski, "fell in love with it." They went to roughly thirty-two publishers before Edward Kastenmeier from Pantheon decided to take on the project. Small sections of the book were downloadable off the internet before the release of the first edition, and it is said that these sections "circulated through the underbellies of Los Angeles, Las Vegas, and San Francisco, through strip clubs and recording studios, long before publication" – though very few were able to experience the book this way initially.

The first edition hardback, which featured special signed inserts, was released on February 29, 2000, and Pantheon released the hardback and paperback editions simultaneously on March 7, 2000. The novel went on to win the New York Public Library's Young Lions Fiction Award and gain a considerable cult following. House of Leaves has been translated into numerous languages, including Dutch, French, German, Greek, Italian, Japanese, Polish, Portuguese, Russian, Serbian, Spanish, and Turkish. It has been taught in universities.

A 2013 New York Times article featured a conversation between Stephen King and his son, Joe Hill, and made reference to the novel:

Joe and Stephen were having another typical conversation: hashing out what novel could be considered the Moby-Dick of horror. 'That one with all the footnotes, they argued – no, not that one, the other one: Mark Danielewski's House of Leaves.'

On June 18, 2018, Danielewski released a TV pilot script for the novel in the House of Leaves book club on Facebook.

House of Leaves has been considered an example of the genre of postmodern horror in literature. A review of House of Leaves by Jousha Simpson of The Writing Post stated that House of Leaves is a complex postmodern horror novel that is able to successfully use the unreliable narrator trope. The cultural impact that House of Leaves has since its release has been the subject of many articles. An article titled Liminal Scares: How 'House of Leaves' Has Redefined Modern Horror by Luiz H.C from the horror news site Bloody Disgusting mentions that the concepts are ideas of horror that are used in House of Leaves have gone on to not only inspire other books but also movies, video games, and internet horror stories. Games such as Alan Wake and Control, released by game studio Remedy Entertainment, have sequences and concepts that are inspired by House of Leaves with Alan Wake having a sequence that references the novel. The most recent example of the impact that House of Leaves has had is the Doom II mod MyHouse.wad. Posted to the Doomworld Forums on March 3, 2023, by user Veddge, MyHouse.wad is a mod for Doom II that was posted under guise that it was a tribute map to the creator's friend. A review from the gaming journal website PC Gamer titled "Doom creator John Romero finally plays its most mind-blowing mod" by Harvey Randall mentions the video essay by YouTuber PowerPakGames, which not only goes into detail on the mod itself but mentions the references and inspirations that MyHouse.wad makes to House of Leaves.

==== Collaboration with Poe ====
In 2000, Danielewski toured Borders locations across the United States with his sister Poe to promote his book and her album Haunted, which has many elements of House of Leaves. The album features Danielewski reading from House of Leaves on several tracks, as well as audio recordings that Tad Danielewski left for Mark and Poe, which they found after his death. In 2001, a remake of Poe's song "Hey Pretty (Drive-By 2001 Mix)," which featured Danielewski reading from House of Leaves, reached #13 on Billboard's Alternative Chart. That summer, Poe and Danielewski spent three months as the opening act for Depeche Mode's 2001 North American tour. On this tour, he played Madison Square Garden. He also composed the song "A Rose Is a Rose," which Poe sang on the Lounge-a-Palooza compilation album.

=== The Fifty Year Sword ===
After the publication of House of Leaves, Danielewski worked on two projects in tandem: his second novel Only Revolutions, and a novella, The Fifty Year Sword, an "adult ghost story". Danielewski created the book itself with the Dutch artist Peter van Sambeek. The recto pages of the book are empty except for page numbers and van Sambeek's art. The Dutch publishing house De Bezige Bij published 1000 first editions on October 31, 2005, and 1000 second editions on October 31, 2006. Little is actually known about the inspiration for the story, or the exact time period during which it was written.

==== Pantheon edition and theatrical collaborations ====
In 2010, Danielewski announced that he would do stage performances of The Fifty Year Sword, the first of which were on October 31, 2010, at the Roy and Edna Disney/CalArts Theater (REDCAT) in Los Angeles. There were two back-to-back sold-out performances that night. The production featured music, five people reading the words of the five speakers in the novella (including Betsy Brandt, who played Marie Schrader on Breaking Bad), and shadow casting by Christine Marie. On October 31, 2011, Danielewski produced a slightly modified production back to back at REDCAT again. There was live music by Partch Ensemble percussionists Matthew Cook and T.J. Troy, as well as Christine Marie's shadow casting and five actors reading. The two performances were again sold out.

In 2012, Pantheon released another edition of The Fifty Year Sword. This edition of the book includes more than 80 hand-stitched illustrations, new typography, and textual changes that were developed thanks to the REDCAT productions. Pantheon organised a book tour to support it, and thanks to an ARC Grant from the Center for Cultural Innovation, the production of The Fifty Year Sword went to five cities around the United States in conjunction with the book release tour for the Pantheon release of The Fifty Year Sword. These performances, smaller in production than the REDCAT performances, featured different actors at every city, including Saturday Night Live alumnus Darrell Hammond in New York. Pianist Christopher O'Riley, a longtime friend and fan of Danielewski, also toured for these performances. The final performance of the tour, on October 31, 2012, was another back-to-back, sold-out production at REDCAT.

=== Only Revolutions ===
Danielewski came up with the concept for his second novel, Only Revolutions, while he was touring for House of Leaves and working on The Fifty Year Sword. He had initially wanted to write something along the lines of a "House of Leaves, Part 2", set in China or elsewhere. However, his publishers pushed for him to do something more complex, with more colors, typographical intricacies and constraints. There are seven colors in Only Revolutions, as opposed to four in House of Leaves. The novel also requires constant physical manipulation to read, whereas only certain sections of House of Leaves require readers to flip the book around.

As the work progressed it became obvious to Danielewski that the novel was something of a counterpoint to House of Leaves; in fact, he has said in interviews that Only Revolutions is centrifugal while House of Leaves is centripetal. This aspect of the novel was brought to the forefront in the endpapers in the hardback versions of Only Revolutions, released September 12, 2006, as well as the "A Spoiler" published by the French literary magazine Inculte in 2007. A paperback edition of the book was published on July 10, 2007, an audiobook featuring music by Danny Elfman was also released that year, and an interactive ebook version was released through Apple's iBooks on December 15, 2015.

Only Revolutions was a finalist for the 2006 National Book Award and has been translated into French, Dutch, and German. Like House of Leaves, Only Revolutions has a cult following and has been taught in universities. In 2013, two graduate students at UC Santa Barbara created an Only Revolutions database called Vizor.

==== Collaboration with Biffy Clyro ====
Danielewski is a fan of the Scottish rock band Biffy Clyro, as they discovered when Danielewski attended one of their shows after they borrowed the title Only Revolutions for their album of the same name. They collaborated for a performance on March 2, 2011, which included readings of Only Revolutions by Danielewski, musical performances by Biffy Clyro, and a Q&A exploring how the book inspired the album. All proceeds went to Homeboy Industries, a Los Angeles-based non-profit that offers training and support to at-risk and formerly gang-involved youth.

=== The Familiar ===
According to Danielewski's comments before his reading/performance of "Parable #8: Z is for Zoo," he began work on The Familiar in 2006, while he was finishing Only Revolutions. It was originally supposed to be a 27-volume project. On September 15, 2010, Danielewski announced the work on his message board: "Later this month publishers will receive the first 5 volumes of Mark Z. Danielewski's 27 volume project entitled The Familiar. The story concerns a 12-year-old girl who finds a kitten. ..." Danielewski expected the series to take him over a decade to complete. The first installment, The Familiar, Volume 1: One Rainy Day in May, was released on May 12, 2015. Volume 2: Into the Forest was released on October 27, 2015, Volume 3: Honeysuckle and Pain was published on June 14, 2016, Volume 4: Hades was released February 7, 2017, and Volume 5: Redwood completed Season One when it was released on October 31, 2017. On February 2, 2018, Danielewski announced via a Facebook post that The Familiar had been paused, saying "I must agree with Pantheon that for now the number of readers is not sufficient to justify the cost of continuing."

In a September, 2017 interview on KCRW's Bookworm, Danielewski said the following when discussing The Familiar as it relates to the progression of literature:

And that's where I think literature finally has to move; we're very good at giving people a voice but we have not begun, strenuously enough, to give voice to that which will never have a voice: the voice of the waves, the animals, the plants, this world we inhabit[.]

=== Tom's Crossing ===
Tom's Crossing is the latest novel by Danielewski and his first major stand alone novel in the 25 years since the release of House of Leaves. Released on October 28, 2025, Tom's Crossing is a modern western that is set in Utah in the year 1982 about two friends who set out on a journey to save two horses that have been marked for death and the trials they encounter on the way to completing the journey they set out on. Reviews for Tom's Crossing have been positive with Tom's Crossing being on The New York Times best seller list and being named "Best Book of the Year" by both The Washington Post and Vulture as well as having many other outlets naming Tom's Crossing as "most anticipated book." Numerous reviewers for Tom's Crossing praised it for being a western epic and how Danielewski was able to bring a new spin to the genre with some critics also comparing Tom's Crossing to Cormac McCarthy's western epic Blood Meridian. A review by American horror author Stephen King praised Tom's Crossing calling it an amazing work of fiction and its originality with King stating that he became immersed in the novel.

A review by The Washington Post titled "The author of ‘House of Leaves’ returns with a thrilling masterpiece" by Jacob Brogan about Tom's Crossing praises it for being a change of the writing style that Danielewski had employed in his early novels The Familiar and House of Leaves with Brogan being pleasantly surprised at how Danielewski was able to write a more linear adventure novel. Brogan goes on to write about how Danielewski uses the neo-western setting of the book to draw the reader into the book with Brogan referencing how Danielewski's writing dropped the g's from certain words with Brogan using the example of "crossing" becoming "crossin." Brogan also writes about how at the Danielewski also writes with what Brogan describes as, "the vocabulary of a mad-lexicon" with Brogan pulling examples of words such as "adiaphanous." Brogan's review also praises the care for detail and how Danielewski often interrupts the story with side characters which seem contrived but serve a grander purpose in expanding the world that Tom's Crossing is set in.

In an interview with the New York Times Danielewski was asked about why he wrote Tom's Crossing and if he set out to write a more accessible novel Danielewski stated that his time writing his planned series The Familiar taught him a lot even though The Familiar series ultimately did not proceed as intended. For Tom's Crossing Danielewski decided that he would write the book by himself and would be isolated for the entire time it took to write the book. Danielewski said that the reason for this was to be able to draw on the experiences of loneliness that fuel the overall theme of Tom's Crossing and how that loneliness in turn is able to become a sense of "vividness" that Danielewski compared to the graphically use of rearranging the pages as he had done in earlier works The Familiar and House of Leaves.

Tom's Crossing also received praise for being a western novel and Danielewski's successful transition from the postmodern genre that was present in many of his early novels. Many reviewers and critics saw this as Danielewski being able to take more steps in darker territories that many westerns are known for. Reviewers and critics noted how Tom's Crossing is a much more gritty and violent novel that calls back to works such as the Iliad and Cormac McCarthy's Blood Meridian.

Tom's Crossing is Danielewski's most lengthy novel to date, sitting at 1,200 pages. In an interview with Variety Danielewski stated that the editing process for Tom's Crossing was very lengthy. The novel had to go through ten drafts and had a manuscript of 1,800 pages. In this same interview when asked about how he managed to keep going during the lengthy editing process Danielewski stated that he was able to find a balance that allowed him to find a state that flowed well for him. Danielewski compared his time working on Tom's Crossing to the concept that the work that he had to do set the tempo of how much he was going to get done and how the work he was doing determined how much time he had and that's how he found a way to be able to continue writing. When asked if he thought that Tom's Crossing could potentially receive a film adaptation Danielewski shared why he felt that Tom's Crossing could not be done properly by comparing it to the same reason why an adaptation of House of Leaves could not work by saying that the "vividness" of the novel and its concepts are just too much to be adapted to the screen. Danielewski did acknowledge that there is the argument to be made that there could eventually be a director who was able to achieve the "vividness" that is present they could eventually adapt Tom's Crossing. The Variety article mentions how after finishing and submitting the 10th draft of Tom's Crossing Danielewski uploaded a video diary to his YouTube channel in which Danielewski went into a deeper dive on his editorial process, his thoughts on the errors that he corrected or has left in and finally his experience of the completion of Tom's Crossing and the final decisions of what would happen once the book was approved by the publishers.

As part of the promotion after the release of Tom's Crossing Danielewski held an event where he did a reading, Q&A and booking signing for Tom's Crossing at Politics and Prose bookstore in Washington D.C on November 8th, 2025. The event was later uploaded to the Politics and Prose YouTube Channel for those to view who were not able to attend the event.

=== Other work ===
==== THROWN ====
From June 5 – September 9, 2015, Danielewski's THROWN, a reflection on Matthew Barney's CREMASTER 2, was displayed at the Guggenheim Museum during its Storylines exhibition.

==== "A Christmas Eve Carol" ====
In December 2018, Danielewski released "A Christmas Eve Carol" as a holiday card for his readers, saying, "I wrote this over twenty years ago and it kept me going when the holidays seemed too dark (and, yeah, they still get dark). Thanks to family and an old friend, I finally finished it or at least managed to come up with this threadbare recording. It's pretty much how I sing it to myself and these days to my little girl. So this year, in lieu of a holiday card with an inky, mischievous cat, please accept these few notes. They've given me comfort. May they give you comfort too ... whatever the hour, whatever the night."

=== Atelier Z ===
In 2010, Danielewski formed a group of translators, researchers, graphic designers, professors, students, and other professionals who work directly with him on various aspects of his work. The atelier has had various members, and in 2012 it was named Atelier Z. It functions like an artistic atelier or studio, with apprentice artists assisting to a master artist as they work on their own endeavors. The members have been listed in the credits of Danielewski's books since 2012.

The atelier seems to have grown directly out of the collaborative work on the Pantheon edition of The Fifty Year Sword, which coincided with the first ever performances of any of Danielewski's work under his own guise. He has spoken in interviews about a group that was working with him on the stitching/artwork for the first Pantheon edition of The Fifty Year Sword, and there is evidence of some of these people working on the productions of The Fifty Year Sword. In 2015, the Danielewski and Atelier Z released the first collection of Yarn + Ink, official House of Leaves and The Familiar apparel.

== Works ==
=== Novels ===
- House of Leaves (2000)
- Only Revolutions (2006)
- The Familiar, Volume 1: One Rainy Day in May (2015)
- The Familiar, Volume 2: Into the Forest (2015)
- The Familiar, Volume 3: Honeysuckle & Pain (2016)
- The Familiar, Volume 4: Hades (2017)
- The Familiar, Volume 5: Redwood (2017)
- The Little Blue Kite (2019)
- Tom's Crossing (2025)

=== Novellas ===
- The Whalestoe Letters (2000)
- The Fifty Year Sword (2005)

=== Short stories, lectures and essays ===
- "The Most Wondrous Book of All" (2000)
- "All the Lights of Midnight: Salbatore Nufro Orejón, 'The Physics of Ero^r' and Livia Bassil's 'Psychology of Physics'" (2001)
- "Only Evolutions" (2007)
- "A Spoiler" (2007)
- "The Promise of Meaning" (2010)
- "Parable #9: The Hopeless Animal and the End of Nature" (2010)
- "Clip 4" (2012)
- "Parable #8: Z is for Zoo" (2014)
- "The Poetics of Space (Foreword)" (2014)
- "A Colored Word" (2019)
- "Love Is Not a Flame – Part 1" (2019)
- "Love Is Not a Flame – Part 2" (2019)
- "Love Is Not a Flame – Part 3" (2019)
- "Love Is Not a Flame – Part 4" (2019)
- "There's a Place for You" (2020)

== Criticism and interpretation ==
- Bray, Joe and Alison Gibbons (ed.). Mark Z. Danielewski. Manchester University Press, 2011.
- Moore, Steven. "Mark Z. Danielewski." in My Back Pages: Reviews and Essays. Zerogram Press, 2017, pp. 126–31.
- Pöhlmann, Sascha (ed.). Revolutionary Leaves: The Fiction of Mark Z. Danielewski. Cambridge Scholars Publishing, 2012.
- Shiloh, Ilana. "The Book as Labyrinth: Mark Danielewski's House of Leaves." In her The Double, the Labyrinth and the Locked Room: Metaphors of Paradox in Crime Fiction and Film. Peter Lang, 2011.
