= Anatomy (video game) =

2016 video game

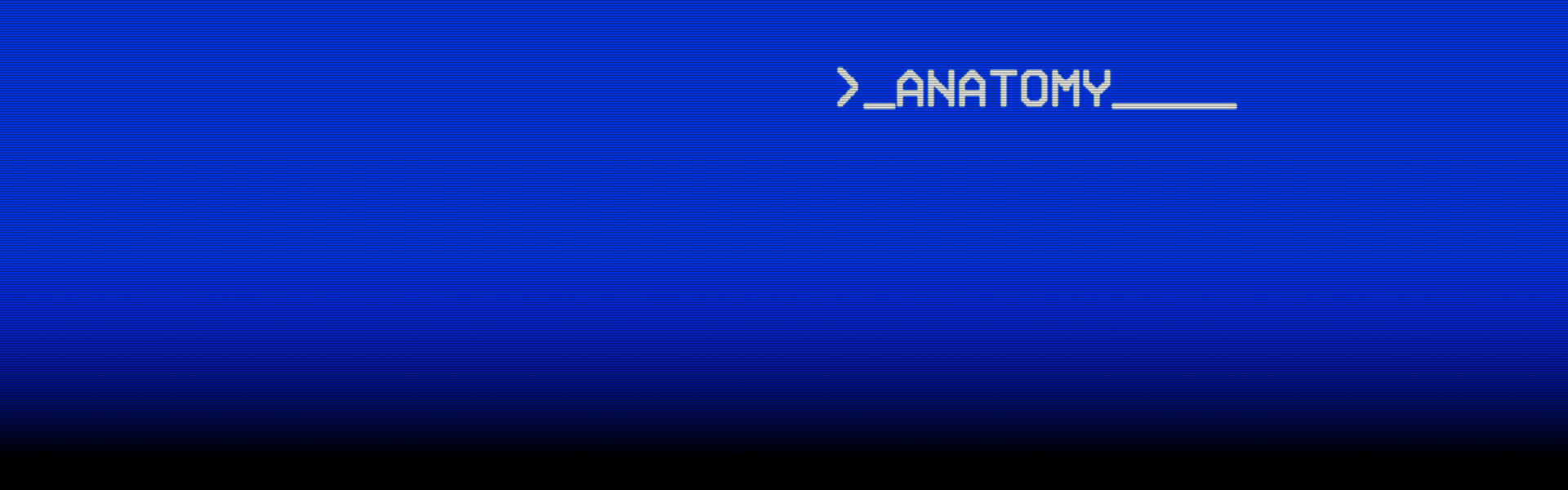
- The banner of the game's itch.io page
- Developer: Kitty Horrorshow
- Platform: Linux; macOS; Microsoft Windows
- Genre: Horror
- Mode: Single-player

Anatomy is a 2016 horror video game developed by Kitty Horrorshow. It was released on Microsoft Windows, macOS X, and Linux.

Gameplay screenshot

Anatomy focuses on exploring an empty house and finding voice tapes within it as the house begins to change around the player. Initially, collecting these tapes is the only component of the game, but the program eventually glitches and closes itself; when reopened, the house has changed radically, with static on the game screen and audio distortion occurring. These shutdown events are repeated as the house continues to degrade more and more upon continued playing of the game.

== Reception ==
The game is considered to be a cult classic. It has received positive reviews from critics. Julie Muncy of Wired wrote that "Anatomy is a powerful entry point to [horror] experience, an explanation of its value and an exploration of its impact. Haunted houses are having a moment, but the best ones, pound for pound, might be in video games. And in terms of succinct power and lasting impact, Anatomy can't be beat." Steven Messner, writing for Rock, Paper, Shotgun, said "It's a curious thing that Anatomy is so effective, because in reality it's a pretty janky Unity game set inside of a small home that you simply walk around and explore." Jacob Geller for Game Informer described Anatomy as the "scariest game I've ever played" and that the lo-fi nature of the graphics and audio contributed significantly to the game's experience. Playboy's Suriel Vazquez commended the game for not relying on monsters and jump scares, leaving it "anything but predictable".

Adam Smith of Rock, Paper, Shotgun referenced the Lovecraftian quote "fear of the unknown", reinterpreting it for Anatomy as "fear of the familiar", whereby even familiar spaces can seem frightening in the dark and the quiet of night. Writing for PC Gamer, Steven Messner discussed how the cultural shared experiences of quarantine during the COVID-19 pandemic heighten the disturbing nature of Anatomy and increase the sinister nature of everyday household objects. He stated that he loved how the game "takes the simple pleasures of a life spent indoors and forces you to see it as something to fear". In a quest to find a game that evokes "true terror", Tom Faber in Financial Times decided that Anatomy was ultimately that game, concluding that the inscrutable nature of the house was what made it terrifying and that what's "scarier than a monster operating as a metaphor is a monster that refuses to mean anything at all".
