= The Whalestoe Letters =

2000 novella by Mark Z. Danielewski

- Cover to the first edition
- Author: Mark Z. Danielewski
- Language: English (United States)
- Genre: Epistolary novella
- Publisher: Pantheon Books
- Publication date: 10 October 2000
- Publication place: United States
- Media type: Print (paperback)
- Pages: 86 p. (paperback edition)
- ISBN: 0-375-71441-3 (paperback edition)
- OCLC: 44811700
- Dewey Decimal: 813/.54 21
- LC Class: PS3554.A5596 W48 2000
- Preceded by: House of Leaves
- Followed by: The Fifty Year Sword

The Whalestoe Letters (2000), by the American fiction author Mark Z. Danielewski, is an epistolary novella which more fully develops the literary correspondence between Pelafina H. Lièvre and her son Johnny from 1982–1989, characters first introduced in Danielewski's prior work House of Leaves.

The letters are included in the second edition of House of Leaves, in Appendix II, under the name E – The Three Attic Whalestoe Institute Letters, although the companion piece includes eleven additional letters not found in House of Leaves.

== Plot introduction ==
Pelafina writes these letters to Johnny from The Three Attic Whalestoe Institute, a mental institution where she has been residing for a number of years. While a number of these letters appear in House of Leaves, The Whalestoe Letters introduces a number of new letters which serve to more fully develop Pelafina's character as well as her relationship with Johnny.
