= The Familiar, Volume 1: One Rainy Day in May =

Book by Mark Z. Danielewski

- Author: Mark Z. Danielewski
- Language: English language
- Genre: Signiconic
- Publisher: Pantheon Books
- Publication date: May 12, 2015
- Publication place: United States
- Media type: Print (Paperback)
- Pages: 880
- ISBN: 978-0375714948
- Preceded by: Only Revolutions
- Followed by: The Familiar, Volume 2: Into the Forest

The Familiar, Volume 1: One Rainy Day in May is an American novel by writer Mark Z. Danielewski. Released on May 12, 2015, it is the first of a planned 27-volume story entitled The Familiar as well as the first book of Season 1, which includes The Familiar Volumes 1–5. This first volume takes place over the course of a single day: May 10, 2014. Its story weaves together nine different narratives from across the globe that continue to develop in subsequent volumes.

== Themes and analysis ==
=== Interconnectedness ===
A repeating theme of this series is the oneness of all things and the many links between people throughout the world despite their differences. Danielewski's characters span multiple races, nationalities, and they speak a variety of languages, including Mexican Spanish, Egyptian Arabic, Armenian, Turkish, Singlish, Mandarin, and Russian. They are also from disparate places; in this first volume the main characters begin in Los Angeles, Marfa, El Tajín, and Singapore. But connections are already forming between them—for instance, Xanther has Tian Li's cat, Cas' friend Sorcerer knows Anwar and Xanther, and Isandòrno and Luther both work with Teyo. Many of the characters of The Familiar also hear the same strangely familiar sound: a cat's yowl.

=== Serialization and televisuality ===
Danielewski has repeatedly expressed his desire to anchor his books in a relationship with a specific form of media. Where House Of Leaves was about a film and Only Revolutions was "about music," The Familiar "is about a television series". The number of volumes announced for The Familiar would then correspond to a whole television series. In a 2011 interview he declared having mapped out the first 10 books as "two 5-volume seasons". In that regard A Rainy Day in May has been described by critics as a "pilot episode". Among his references, Danielewski quotes the experience of "the five seasons of The Wire or the wild speculations of Battlestar Galactica" which are built upon multiple storylines: "these visual novels have come into our living rooms and bedrooms and they tell a story in much greater detail and with much greater patience." To him, the choice to remediate, within a series of books, the way "prestige" TV shows have shaped narratives, is "a longform investment in the future."

This description of modern TV shows as "visual novels" and of The Familiar as an ongoing televisual series albeit in the shape of a book, resonates in the typographic world of the book. Each volume of The Familiar opens with visuals that feed from its fictional universe, including the mini-series "Caged Hunt," a fully transcribed description of a video encased in the recognizable, YouTube-like frame of a digital player. The pervasive presence of television series as keystones of American mainstream culture, can also be felt in the numerous references to Battlestar Galactica as a common enjoyment of Anwar and his daughter Xanther, to be compared with the mentions and quotes from books and videogames, a modern mediatic panorama.

== Writing process and collaboration ==
In writing this series, which took over nine years to conceive, Danielewski "had to rely on individuals, on technologies, [and] on actual trips to places." People involved in the project include professors, grad students, researchers, computer programmers, graphic artists, translators, even Los Angeles detectives. He calls his closest group of collaborators "Atelier Z" (inspired by the French term atelier), but the number of people involved in work on The Familiar is much larger than that:

"Well, the Atelier Z itself is never more that two to five people; these are the core of people who are constantly working, who put an absurd amount of energy and love into it. And then if you check the back of any volume, you'll see that there's easily two dozen people that are involved, all over the world, in Turkey, in Spain, in France, in various places. So it's a global effort, where I frequently Skype with individuals, I go over the visuals or whatever they're doing."

Additionally, before the United States release of this first volume on May 12, 2015, Pantheon made advance copies available for classroom use, and university faculty and students in the United States and England participated in a cross-institutional reading of the novel. This group included University of California, Santa Barbara; University of Tennessee, Knoxville; De Montfort University; University of Notre Dame; University of California, Davis; Weber State University; and Clemson University.

== Format ==
Like Danielewski's other work, The Familiar has a very particular structure, and this first volume created the framework that each subsequent volume has followed thus far. Each volume contains:

- Exactly 880 pages divided into 30 chapters
- Front matter detail including two pages of advertisements from the world of The Familiar
- Three previews (akin to TV previews) in a section called, "New This Season"
- Five acts
- Five entr'actes
- One GC episode and one TMD episode
- A final dedication (akin to TV credits)
- A final sequence involving an animal

The chapters have their own structure as well. Since there are nine different main characters that take turns narrating the story in the third person, each of the nine narratives is indicated with a different font and a different colored dog-ear in the corner of each page.

== Main characters ==
- Xanther Ibrahim: a twelve-year-old girl in Los Angeles with epilepsy.
- Luther Perez: a Mexican-American gang member in Los Angeles.
- Anwar Ibrahim: Xanther's (step)father, a black Egyptian-American video game designer.
- Jingjing: a drug addict in Singapore who assists Tian Li, a healing woman.
- Astair Ibrahim: Xanther's mother, a PhD candidate and a therapist.
- Cas: a computer scientist in Marfa, Texas, also known as The Wizard.
- Özgür "Oz" Talat: a Turkish-American detective in the Murder Investigation Unit of the LAPD.
- Shnorhk Zildjian: an Armenian-American taxi driver in Los Angeles.
- Isandòrno: an existentialist in El Tajín, Mexico.

There are also the Narcons, beings who may or may not exist outside the narrative of the novel and provide commentary on it.

== Plot summary ==
The novel takes place over the course of one day: May 10, 2014. The chapters are all bracketed by timestamps that indicate the exact moments when they begin and end. As the title indicates, on May 10 there was a torrential rain in the Los Angeles of the novel (May 10, 2014 was a cloudless day in Earth's Los Angeles).

=== Chapter 1: "Is Everything Okay?" [Xanther] ===
Los Angeles, California. Xanther begins May 10 with her father Anwar knowing that at the end of the day he plans to give her a "big surprise" he and Astair have been planning for her. In the morning she and Anwar go to breakfast together, and in the car on the way she almost has a seizure while looking out into the rain, but she lies to Anwar about it for fear of worrying him. Instead she tells him she was daydreaming about her biological father, Dov.

=== Chapter 2: Lupita's [Luther] ===
Los Angeles, California. Luther stands in the rain with a blanket over his head, looking for something or someone. Almoraz, a fellow gang-member, and Chitel, a younger boy, stand with him. Almoraz insults Luther and Luther headbutts him in the nose. From the doorway of the nearby house, Miz, a weathered member of the group, asks them if they're staying for breakfast. He's stirring his famous pancake batter. Miz also takes a look at Almoraz's nose. He gives it a tug and determines it's not broken. Lupita, the gang boss, tells Luther to stay for breakfast. She tells Luther to go with Chitel and his crew to sell in Glendale. When Luther resists, saying he's got his own work, she gets riled up, and in the process ends up in a coughing fit.

=== Chapter 3: Square One [Anwar] ===
Los Angeles, California. Anwar and Xanther get breakfast at Square One Dining, a real restaurant in Los Angeles. She asks if she's late for her appointment with Dr. Potts, her therapist. Anwar says it's not until 10am. In his head, he notes that the "big surprise" isn't til 3pm in Venice. He also notes its cost: $20,000, which would be untenable if not for a $50,000 check that Ehtisham, his business partner, says he has in hand. As they eat, Xanther asks Anwar how game engines work. Anwar answers her with long explanations. She also asks if his co-workers Glasgow and Talbot will be at the meeting, will Mefisto as well? We learn that Mefisto is a fellow programmer and close friend of Anwar's, though they haven't seen each other in over a year. A few days prior, though, he had called out of the blue to warn the Ibrahim family of a prank for a web advertisement gone astray. The result was on onslaught of calls and messages at the Ibrahim house (what Anwar calls the "telephonic seizure"). When Anwar checks his phone now, his voicemail is full, he has 117 missed calls, and 2187 unread text messages. He can't even check his email accounts. Anwar's thoughts drift to a memory of Xanther standing in front of Dov's casket at the Arlington National Cemetery. Xanther notices and cuts the train off, "Now look who's thinking about Dov?" she says. "I miss him," Anwar admits. He thinks how it's odd how he and Dov (Xanther's biological father) managed to have a good relationship when his own courtship of Astair began when she was three months pregnant with Xanther. In the car driving from breakfast, Xanther asks about Dov. Where did he go after he died? Anwar answers with the best he can: he asks Xanther to remember the last time she saw Dov to demonstrate that he still lives on in her memory.

=== Chapter 4: zhong [Jingjing] ===
Singapore. Jingjing's narrative, set in Singapore, is characterized by an almost phonetical rendition of Singlish, a creole language that is a mix of Malay, Hokkien Chinese and English, among other languages. Jingjing works for a healing woman, Tian Li, rumored to be a witch and the owner of a mysterious cat. Standing in a void deck Jingjing is listening to a group of strangers gossiping about his employer. Unwilling to openly discuss the cat's disturbing nature with strangers, he remembers that he once saw its shadow move while the cat remained still. However, he describes how the small animal rides on Tian Li's shoulder whenever she leaves the apartment complex. We are quickly introduced to Jingjing's fondness for collectible "monster cards" (each volume of the Familiar features one or more cards from his deck).

Jingjing recalls his first meeting with Tian Li, four years ago. The police had just arrested him in a park for drug use and she had convinced them to let him go. She had offered him a job if he swore to forsake his addiction. Life in her employ still leaves Jingjing unfulfilled, and he fantasizes about leaving Singapore. As he takes a walk in the rain, he finds Tian Li with a man kneeling down in front of her, he recognizes a billionaire named Zhong Sim Lin. He is asking for a favor and is ready to pay any amount of money in return. Jingjing is called in to play the role of a translator and Tian Li eventually accepts Zhong's request.

=== Chapter 5: Big Surprise [Astair] ===
Los Angeles, California. In this chapter Astair is home with her twin eight-year-old daughters Shasti and Freya. She notices that rain is leaking through the ceiling and thinks about calling their landlord, Cyril Kosiginski. Her phone is constantly ringing because of Mefisto's prank, and she has unplugged the landlines. She still has not opened the thick manila envelope on her bed that contains her graded thesis from her advisor. It is titled Hope's Nest: On the Necessity of God, a title she now considers "winceworthy." She thinks about how successful her colleagues have been and doubts that she will do as well as they have. Then she realizes that her friend Taymor has arrived to pick them all up, but before they leave the twins want to know about Xanther's surprise. She wishes they would show more sympathy for Xanther, and thinks about how Xanther has no companion—not Dov and not her sisters—which is why Astair wants to get her the surprise. At the end of the chapter she tells Shasti and Freya that the surprise is a dog.

=== Chapter 6: The Orb [Cas] ===
Marfa, Texas. Cas and Bobby are hiding out in their Airstream RV and she is focused on the Orb, a mysterious object they have that can show clips of the past. The chapter begins with a vision from the Orb of a red planet; Cas hones in on a white temple on a mesa near the planet's equator. The temple is immaculate and white, somehow untouched by the red planet's surface. It remains the same at all points in time up to the present. Cas goes to take a walk when Bobby asks if she wants lunch, and she sees police cars driving by on Route 67. She then asks Bobby if he knows where their friends Endoria, Artemis, Treebeard, Sorcerer, or Warlock are; he does not. But their friend Deakin, who goes by the nickname Merlin, is safe in a nearby hotel, and he invited them over for dinner. Bobby seems slightly uncomfortable about that, and she assumes it is because Cas had a fling with Deakin in the 1970s. Cas thinks about how Recluse managed to completely erase all traces of them from the Internet, including the information they wanted the public to know. Then she hears a distant cry and remembers April 15, 1958, when a formula had suddenly occurred to her. As Bobby eats, Cas holds the Orb, and he suggests that it might be evil.

The chapter ends on May 10, 2014, at 12:04:07.

=== Chapter 7: Power Draws a Crowd [Özgür] ===
Los Angeles, California. Özgür's narrative is rife with police jargon and acronyms; he often reminisces about his 27 years in the LAPD. On his way to a Turkish restaurant, he chances upon a fellow officer, Rodney Balascoe, famous for systematic use of lunch boxes, by fear of getting shot in a public place. Walking in on an arrest, Özgür speaks briefly to an apprehended youth, Marvin d'Organidrelle (aka Android). Özgür's narrative is rhythmically interrupted by the word "katla" (fold, in Turkish), a reference to the fact that he likes to fold origami animals in the manner of Gaff, the character from Blade Runner he identifies with, over the protagonist Deckard. Özgür's thoughts then turn to a former lover, Elaine, who once asked him if he would ever leave the city.

The chapter ends on May 10, 2014, at 10:30:38.

=== Chapter 8: Dr. Potts [Xanther] ===
Los Angeles, California. In this chapter Xanther is in a therapy appointment with her therapist, a man she calls Dr. Potts. She mentions that unlike Astair and most of her teachers, he is always very patient with her when she asks questions, which she calls "The Question Song." In this chapter we learn that Anwar faces discrimination because he is black and Egyptian, a duality that Xanther has trouble understanding. She also mentions her friends Mayumi, Josh, Kle, Bayard, and Cogs, as well as the boy who bullies her, Dendish. She talks to Dr. Potts about Kle's younger brother Phinneas, who has tried to kill himself twice. She also mentions that she feels guilty because her parents spend so much money on her due to her epilepsy, and she thinks her sisters Shasti and Freya don't get as much as she does. Toward the end of the appointment she tells him about the cruel "prank" Mefisto pulled on her family by putting their contact information in an ad campaign, and then she tells him that sometimes she thinks there is a conversation going on around her, a reference to the Narcons. They end the appointment by talking about Dov, who we learn is dead. Xanther thinks he was very brave, more than she could ever be.

=== Chapter 9: Blue Pencil [Luther] ===
Los Angeles, California. Luther is in the van with fellow gang members Victor and Tweetie, as well as Piña. Hopi Mannitou, a kid who looks to be about 14, climbs into the car. He's got a stutter and a shifty, anxious demeanor. Luther can't believe he wants to join the gang, but Piña seems to like him. Luther is confused why Teyo, the gang's leader, wants him to deal with Hopi. Piña tells Luther that Hopi knows him and worships him "like some kind of god." They stop to pick up Juarez, a feral bruiser who Luther calls his Dirty Jackal. Hopi says it's raining so much it's like you're swimming. Luther asks him if he likes swimming. Hopi doesn't answer. They stop to eat at IHOP, where everybody is amazed at how much Hopi can eat. Their server is named Quantelle; Luther imagines having sex with her in the back office or the bathroom. He asks for her number. When the bill comes, Luther covers it. Hopi offers to throw in, but Luther rejects it. Juarez asks to see what's in his pockets. After initial hesitation he reveals he only has a few wrappers and a blue pencil. "You want a blue pencil?" Juarez asks Luther. Luther asks if he wants to pay with the blue pencil. Hopi gets scared and says he'd work to pay off the meal. Luther hands the pencil back. "I already told you, Hopi, I got it. On me, pinche. Free."

=== Chapter 10: "Yeah, man. Something died." [Shnorhk] ===
Los Angeles, California. Shnorhk, a taxi driver of Armenian descent, is wrongfully accused of running a red light and crashing into a police officer's car. His only eye-witness is missing from court and makes up an excuse on the phone. Accused by officer Grady Vennerød, Shnorhk lacks even the support of his lawyer, and falls twice in a fit of coughing.

=== Chapter 11: Bones Nest [Astair] ===
Los Angeles, California. Astair is with Taymor, Shasta and Freya in a pet store to get a dog bed for the dog. She thinks about how she wishes she was closer to Xanther, something that Taymor wouldn't understand because she is very close to her daughter Roxanne. Taymor is skeptical about the fact that Astair and Anwar spent $20,000 on a Seizure Assistance and Alert Dog, but Astair hopes it is worth it. She remembers Xanther's worst seizure, a tonic-clonic that had struck at Dov's funeral and lasted five minutes and 32 seconds. Astair recalls the story of The Bookstore Girl died after seizing for three minutes. While she and Taymor are talking Taymor asks about her sex life, but she avoids the question. A little later on, the twins take one of the most expensive dog beds out into the rain, and Astair is forced to pay for it. As they are checking out she explains to Taymor that Dov died in Afghanistan. The chapter ends with Taymor wondering if Xanther is as excited about the dog as Astair.

=== Chapter 12: palace above the day [Jingjing] ===
Singapore. Jingjing and Tian Li are in Zhong's palace to discuss his offer. Jingjing steals commodities from the bathroom, but cannot bring himself to take gold coins placed in a bowl. Employees from Zhong belittle them in Russian, unaware of the fact that Jingjing understands. In the "Owl room", decorated with a tapestry of Lei Gong, the Chinese god of thunder, Jingjing discovers that Zhong also speaks Mandarin, but Tian Li chooses to talk in Cantonese, and Jingjing resumes his role as translator again. To his surprise, Tian Li tells Zhong "we've been here before" (Jinjing supposes she means herself and the cat). Shortly after, she has a painful attack and as they leave the room she asks details about Zhong's son. The chapter ends on May 11, 2014, at 03:47:18.

=== Chapter 13: Veinte Pesos [Isandòrno] ===
El Tajín, Mexico. Isandòrno sits with a group of women at a bus stop, waiting for a bus that's running late. Across the road, an old Indian man has set up a stand to sell handmade goods to passersby. He laughs from across the road, and Isandòrno feels like he's looking directly at him. The women tell him to pay no attention, but Isandòrno begins toward him. Halfway across the road, he hears a strange sound underneath the laughter: the sound of a wounded creature. He can't locate it. He squats to focus in on it. Then, it stops. He muses that this is as absurd as what he's doing: crouching on a blacktop between Poza Rica (where he's coming from) and Papantla (where he's heading). He stands back up and gets lost in thought. We see glimpses of his past, including his connection and work with his employer, The Mayor. We learn that he's awaiting three crates in Veracruz. Isandòrno accepts the women's offer to take shelter from the rain and eat with them. He falls asleep there, and when he wakes, one of the women approaches and offers to read his fortune. She begins to share what she reads but stops short and redirects. She tells him he is always on the cusp of things, ever on the edge of life and death. He walks toward the old Indian, who keeps laughing but retreats into his shack by the trailer. Isandòrno follows. An old, drunk woman seated nearby continues to laugh, but goes out into the rain when he gives her a look. The old Indian's daughter won't look at Isandòrno. She has sores all over her body. Laid along warped planks are handmade wooden trinkets. The old Indian notes that Isandòrno is "Mexica." Isandòrno holds up a totem and takes out all his money, which is enough to keep the old Indian and his family alive and well for years, but the man shakes his head. "The carving costs veinte pesos. But what hunts you now amigo you already own."

=== Chapter 14: The Horrorsphere [Xanther] ===
Los Angeles, California. Anwar brings Xanther to the startup company where he works in Culver City, Los Angeles. Everyone is celebrating with drinks because they recently finished a big project, but this overwhelms Xanther so she hides in the bathroom. Once there she sees text messages from her friends asking her about the "big surprise," but she still doesn't know what it is. She then opens the app Parcel Thoughts, which has three sections that Xanther calls "spheres": the Solosphere (just her), the Amicasphere (including friends), and the Noosphere (including nearly everyone in her school). She also calls the Noosphere the Horrorsphere because Dendish posts gruesome edited pictures of her and her friends there. After this Xanther leaves the bathroom and asks Anwar to tell her what the surprise is. He gladly tells her, and then lets her try out a bunch of games, including his "pet project" called Paradise Open. At the end of the chapter she overhears that a man named Realic is dead.

=== Chapter 15: Dawgz [Luther] ===
Los Angeles, California. Luther can hear a cat from somewhere and tells the gang to find it. He tells Hopi to open the door to the dog cages, but Hopi can't move. Tweetie steps in and shoves Hopi to the ground and does it for him. The dogs roar out, already hunting. This place, Dawgz, used to be where he ran all kinds of animal fights (but mainly dogs). People of all backgrounds would come out and bet. They had to stop it after Michael Vick and the Bad Newz investigation in 2007. Though he didn't own the house, he kept the lease to take care of the girls who took care of his dogs. Carmelita greets Luther. He asks where Rosario is, and Carmelita says she's out. Luther tosses her an "extra Grant" to make Rosario jealous when she gets home. Luther asks about his pool then grabs Carmelita's pink umbrella, motioning for Hopi to follow. At the sheds, Hopi has no trouble with the padlock. Luther hears the animal cry for a second time. Luther can also hear his nine dogs barking. Hopi tells Luther he knows he doesn't need him but he's good at computers and phones, and what he doesn't know he can read about and learn to be of use. It reminds Luther of what he said to Teyo way back when. They let the dogs out to play in the pool, which has a foot of water in the bottom. Juarez scares Hopi by nearly pushing him in with the dogs. They ask him how old he is and are surprised when he reveals he's 21. Piña finds one of Rosario's Manolos. Luther tells Hopi to take it to the dogs. He crawls along the diving board because he's too scared to walk. Luther tells him to drop the shoe in and it's in shreds within moments. Hopi dangles over the diving board and lands safely in the pool. The dogs gather around him and play and lick his face. Everyone is amazed.

=== Chapter 16: Prey [Anwar] ===
Los Angeles, California. At Sementera, their office, Ehtisham says that Kozimo, a Ukrainian venture capitalist and owner of the company Dead Rowboats, "promises" they'll have the funds in the morning, revising his earlier claim. Anwar wants to call Kozimo to touch base. When he takes out his phone, he sees now 314 missed calls and 6999 new text messages. He also sees 30,653 e-mails. Anwar again tries to figure out what Mefisto's motives were in causing this mess. He wishes he could ask him to help debug Paradise Open, their game. Xanther asks about the name, which Anwar leaves a mystery for her to solve. The game keeps crashing. Talbot finally figures out the problem and Anwar fixes it. Talbot, who Anwar notes has grown increasingly paranoid from a life of smoking weed every day, asks Anwar if he knows about the "clips." He does not. When he asks to hear more, Talbot says, "Not kid-friendly," which shuts the conversation down despite Xanther's protests. Talbot continues to sift through the code for bugs to fix because the game keeps crashing when it runs. Ehtisham informs Anwar that he tried repeatedly to get in touch with Kozimo to no avail. He left messages and now he's waiting for a call back. He managed to speak with Paul Bucksea, the CFO of Dead Rowboats, who assured him the deal is as good as done. Then Anwar hears a strange sound from outside. He opens the window to hear better, but Xanther calls him over to show him that Talbot fixed Paradise Open. They cheer, pour drinks, and Anwar, in a fit of missing Mefisto, toasts the man. Xanther starts to play the game. Anwar notes she's really good at it without any training. They explain she's being chased by something so she cannot slow down, even though she can't see what's chasing her. She asks who or what she is, and all she's able to uncover is that she's prey.

=== Chapter 17: Is little irrelevant [Shnorhk] ===
Los Angeles, California. Shnorhk is at his friend Mnatsagan's house, helping him moving boxes from his car into the house. Mnatsagan is a history teacher and the two discuss Shnork's most memorable encounters as a taxi driver. Shnorhk finds himself coughing a bit of blood, but hides it. As he lifts the final box, he notices a strange sound that may be a small animal in need of help, but is called inside the house. Shnorhk inquires about the documents Mnatsagan is going to scan: his friend explains that the boxes are filled with first-hand testimonies of 729 survivors of the Armenian genocide. Shnorhk offers to help. When he hears him cough again, Mnatsagan advises Shnorhk to see a doctor promptly.

=== Chapter 18: View of the Sea [Özgür] ===
Los Angeles, California. Özgür pays his somewhat traditional visit to a man called Cletious Clay, whose son had been murdered in plain day, 20 years ago. The case had remained unresolved, though suspicions pointed toward a gang initiation picking a random victim. The years have left Özgür weary, he involves himself less and less on current investigations. He later discusses retirement with his friend Detective Florian Sérbulo, considers joining Elaine if she gets a teaching position outside Los Angeles. On their way to Long Beach, they are drawn to an accident involving an elderly lady, surrounded by paramedics. As they investigate the crime scene and the inside of a house, they discover three dead bodies. They are joined by Agent Tramilli of the FBI. Outside of the house, Özgür notices something written backward on the window, the letters «VEM» though doesn't know what it corresponds to. Another FBI agent accidentally removes the word by backing up to the window.

=== Chapter 19: Cinnamon [Astair] ===
Los Angeles, California. Astair is at home with Shasti and Freya, in hers and Anwar's bedroom. She looks at the unopened manuscript on her bed and remembers Taymor repeatedly asking about her sex life. As she walks around the house, she thinks to herself that she feels like a dry kettle. She thinks about the Akita they are about to get and remembers all the research she did to choose a breed. She wanted a dog first, but she is sure Xanther will love it too. She hopes it will make everyone in the household feel better, and improve her relationship with her daughter. When she finally returns upstairs to the master bedroom she momentarily panics, thinking her manuscript is ruined by the leaky roof, but it is safe and dry. She brings it downstairs, still unopened, and fondly watches her girls play in the pool.

=== Chapter 20: Litter [Xanther] ===
Los Angeles, California. Xanther and Anwar drive amidst heavier rain on their way to get the dog that is her "big surprise." Anwar asks Xanther to call the adoption agency, Galvadyne, Inc., and over the phone she hears that the dog is currently named SugarLady and feels uneasy. Her thoughts stray to the Horrorsphere, Realic, and Paradise Open before her brain starts up a more uplifting Question Song about the dog. She asks Anwar what breed it is and he tells her she will find out. At this point she starts to feel strange, so she turns up the song on the radio: "When the Levee Breaks" by Led Zeppelin. It doesn't help; she hears a familiar cry inside her that seems to get louder when she opens the window to look at a sign, despite the fact that the rain is pouring and such a cry would never be audible. She races out into the storm after the sound without saying goodbye. She continues to hear the meek cry for help as she runs over puddles, through intersections, and down a steep hill. At one point she falls on her hands and knees and loses her glasses, but she keeps going. Finally she comes to a sewer drain, where she drops to the ground and starts digging through the litter. Once it starts to give way she plunges her arms through the grating to grasp onto a tiny white creature. When she sees that it appears to be dead she starts crying, cradling it against her chest in the downpour.

=== Chapter 21: raeden [Jingjing] ===
Singapore. Zhong has asked Tian Li to use her healing powers to wake his son Raeden from his coma. While she unsuccessfully attempts to reach him, Jingjing is taken to a room where several employees of Zhong smoke, drink and play. There are the Jude Boys (Pink Pearl and Copper Azure) and Cocoa Cherry. Jingjing shuffles his deck and gives a monster card to each of them, a fourth is meant for Raeden. It represents a Pontianak. Copper Azure compares the color of his card to the pale blue balloons of the drug he uses. Jingjing mentions that he was using four years ago, but stopped consuming drugs altogether. Zhong's son himself fell into his coma in 2013, shortly after smoking a blue balloon. They discuss a pink new strand of such balloons rumored to arrive in Singapore. After all her efforts failed, Tian Li eventually gives up and tells Jingjing they will head home.

=== Chapter 22: 'Save him!' [Anwar] ===
Los Angeles, California. Anwar circles around in the pouring rain searching for Xanther, barely able to see through the rain. He's panicking, driving over sidewalks to cut through traffic. He's trying to spot Xanther in her bright orange raincoat when realizes she left it behind on her seat. He descends into a string of memories as he continues to search, amidst a panicked sensation that he's having a stroke or dying. He speeds up. The passenger-side door is still wide open, rain soaks the car. He thinks he sees Xanther so he cuts through traffic, cuts across a corner just barely missing a stop sign and a fire hydrant. He slams on the brakes, but when he looks around he still can't see her anywhere. Then, finally: "Daddy!" Xanther screams. Anwar stops and Xanther darts into the car. Her arms are covered in blood. "Daddy! Save him!"

=== Chapter 23: Walk [Luther] ===
Los Angeles, California. Luther and the gang drive in the van as the rain continues to fall. They pass around "a bottle Juarez might as well have pulled out of his back pocket" with no label. Tweetie, who's driving, is the only one to turn it away. Luther notices how everybody has stopped picking on Hopi. When they arrive at their destination, they search the area and see that nobody's around. Hopi asks Piña in a whisper if this is when he's going to get jumped into the gang. Piña shushes him. The crew notices big holes in the ground that have filled with water. Juarez pushes Hopi into one of them. Luther gets on the ground and reaches in. At first he can't find Hopi anywhere, but finally grabs him by a handful of hair and yanks him out. Hopi asks Luther when he'll have tattoos like Luther's. Victor says he can start getting them after he's jumped in. Luther asks what he keeps a blue pencil for. "Ink scares me." Luther asks what he uses it for. He says he uses it to write stuff when he gets befuddled. Juarez says he's a cop. Piña brushes him off. Hopi tells them that he enjoys writing, but Luther feels like there's more to it. Earlier in the day they'd pulled over for a visit with an old pimp named Nacho Mirande. One of the girls in his building recognized Hopi and ran out into the rain to give him a huge hug. Back in the van, Luther asks Hopi how he knows the girl. Hopi says he's "gotta put that blue pencil to use somehow." By the holes, Luther slaps Hopi three times. Hopi takes the hits. He thanks Luther when a fourth doesn't come. "Is that it?" Hopi asks. "Am I in?" Luther says he isn't, then starts punching him hard, splitting his lip. Hopi falls to the ground and stays face-down. Juarez kicks Hopi twice. He rears back to do a running kick but slips and falls, Piña laughs. Juarez reaches into his back pocket and pulls out nunchucks. Tweetie grabs Hopi by the hair and pulls him to his knees. Juarez smacks a nunchuck against his knee and howls in pain. Hopi again asks if he's in. Tweetie pulls out a gun. When Hopi sees the gun pointed at him, it dawns on him that this isn't an initiation. He begs Piña to intercede. She turns away. He begins to sob. Luther rips off Hopi's necklace and tosses it to Piña. He orders Juarez to get Hopi out of his jacket and empty his pockets. When he does, he finds the blue pencil and a grilled cheese sandwich from earlier wrapped in tinfoil. Hopi says it was for his mother. Hopi begs Luther to let him live. Luther grabs him by the neck and drags him to the edge of one of the holes. Luther then walks around to the other side of the hole. Tweetie, Juarez, Piña, and Victor form a wall behind Hopi. Luther orders Hopi to stand up. He complies. Luther peels off his shirt to reveal his tattoos, scars, and bullet wounds. He holds his arms out wide, then "steps forward and walks on water."

=== Chapter 24: The Fourth Crate [Isandòrno] ===
Veracruz, Mexico. Isandòrno will soon arrive at "The Ranch." Waiting for him there will be three crates, Juan Ernesto Izquierdo, his wife Maria, and their children Nastasia and Estella (who refer to Isandòrno as "Tio"). He has known the family for years and he always gives them hard candy when he sees them. The crates come from Africa and have arrived early. The first crate houses a small hyena, the second a baby elephant, the third a baby giraffe. Because of mishandling at the docks, they're all wounded and barely able to move, and their breath smells "damp with infection." Isandòrno doubts they'll survive the trip north. Isandòrno asks the cab driver of the flatbed why there are four crates instead of the expected three. He shrugs. Before approaching it, Isandòrno asks what's inside. The driver says he can just take it back. Isandòrno decides it would be better to see the animal before making that decision. As he approaches, he goes through the superstitions he learned from his unnamed lover, and he's reminded of the reading the fortune teller gave earlier. He stops himself before opening it, paralyzed with indecision.

=== Chapter 25: Tiny Storms [Cas] ===
Marfa, Texas. Cas and Bobby are at Hotel Paisano to meet Deakin. When he does not appear they ask the manager, Kirby, to take them to Deakin's room, and they find it full of smoke. At this moment a few clips from the Orb disturb the narrative. The Viking 1 lands on Mars in 1976; Pickett's Charge happens in 1863; two children in a cave centuries ago paint their faces and then die; in Clip #1 Toland's daughter Audra drowns in 1962; a baby named Alvin Alex Anderson stares up above his crib. The uncertainty of the Orb resembles the smoke in Deakin's room. Cas thinks about these clips and how she had found Audra's body. Then she thinks of how Bobby always manages to put out fires and remembers a close encounter with a cop in their Airstream trailer. She thinks of Deakin's Parcel Thoughts profile, where he had posted updates about everyone: Thanatos, Thaumaturge, Artemis, and Treebeard dead; Pythia, Endoria, and Lilith arrested; Circe and Sibyll missing. Bobby also discovered that their friend Realic S. Tarnen had been tortured and cut into pieces in Los Angeles. Sorcerer had still sent no word of his whereabouts, so he might have died too. Back in the hotel, Cas and Bobby walk in behind Kirby to find it empty. In the bathtub Deakin's Orb is blown to bits. They leave soon after and return to their RV. At the close of the chapter it is revealed that the girl in Clip #6 is Xanther. Cas knows this because Sorcerer knows both Xanther and Anwar.

=== Chapter 26: "Mom, it's a--" [Astair] ===
Los Angeles, California. Xanther and Anwar get home, and Astair panics when she sees that Xanther is missing her glasses and she is bleeding. She assumes Xanther has had another seizure and is confused by the fact that Anwar and Xanther are smiling. She becomes frustrated when Xanther looks at her incredulously and slips by her into the house. She asks if the cat is a Chihuahua and angrily asks where the Akita is. She starts to tear up, the illusion shattering as she realizes finally that the creature Xanther was holding is a cat. She hates the cat on sight, but she is the only one who senses that something about it is eerie.

=== Chapter 27: auntie! [Jingjing] ===
Singapore. Jingjing is confronted with the strange mood of his employer and stranger events in the house : all the doors and windows are opened, though there is no trace of a burglary. Tian Li requests an ice-cream, almost doesn't recognize Jingjing when he comes back and falls asleep. Jingjing had never seen her sleep. Back to the void deck of the building, he shows the gold coin he had eventually stolen from Zhong's bowl to his neighbors Spencer, Lau Jerry and Delson. They taunt him, the gold turns out to be chocolate candy. Struck by an intuition, Jingjing hurries back to wake up Tian Li and asks her where her cat has gone, that it may be lost. Tian Li replies by saying, "Not lost. Just gone. Gone at last. Gone for good."

=== Chapter 28:, dead [Anwar] ===
Los Angeles, California. Anwar drives with his twin daughters Freya and Shasti (Xanther's younger half-siblings) back to the spot in Venice where Xanther lost her glasses. When they arrive, the twins almost instantly find the glasses, "lenses scratched but somehow still whole" and the frames splintered, but otherwise intact. Then they head to a pet store in Silver Lake. The clerk recognizes the girls from earlier. Anwar buys cat food. At home, Xanther tells Anwar that Astair is acting weird. Anwar goes into their room to find her lying unmoving atop their comforter in the dark. When asked what he can do, Astair asks if he can make her laugh. He tells her the owner of Urban Tails was hitting on him. When he's able to get the "tiniest of smiles," Anwar goes on to say that the vet warned Xanther that a cat that young probably wouldn't survive the night without its mother. He also finds out that Astair's thesis was marked "Incomplete." Astair rallies and the family gathers for dinner. Xanther showcases all the bottles and tubes her mother helped her with, and Anwar goes and gets some plywood to set up the cat's house (on top of the dog bed). Anwar tells Xanther she's not allowed to have the animal in her own bed nor is she allowed to spend the night down here with it. In their bedroom that night, the couple make love, which comes on easy, but leaves Anwar feeling like Astair isn't satisfied. Anwar goes downstairs. Enzio, a game company, has a project called "Cataplyst-1." They offered Anwar $9,000 to debug it, and though he doesn't fancy himself the best engineer, the Ibrahims need the money. He can't sleep, Anwar decides to stay up and code Paradise Open. Later, Anwar checks the box and sees that the cat is gone. He checks Xanther's room and finds it there. Anwar thinks back to the events from earlier. How Xanther handed him the cat and begged him to save it. Acting instinctively, he gave it CPR. As he did, mounting concerns about health and hygiene swirled in his mind. Wracked with pain from Dov's funeral, and a need to save something, Anwar keeps breathing into the animal to try to save it. After a while, it moves again. Anwar, back in the present, looks in on Xanther. He takes in her room, the desk, the posters, and the seven indeterminate forms he inscribed on a napkin.

=== Chapter 29: St. Hopi [Luther] ===
Los Angeles, California.

Luther tries to reconstruct the events from earlier in a way that makes sense. It turns out the pool had only been an ankle deep, which is why he appeared to walk on water. Juarez had run off in total terror at the sight. Luther then grabbed Hopi by the roots of his hair and dragged him to a different hole. It looked even shallower than the one before, but before Luther could do the work of drowning Hopi, Hopi whispers, "Forgive me," and then goes into the water on his own and doesn't come up. In the aftermath, Luther tries to drown out the noise in his head. First he thinks he'll spend time with his crew, then his dogs, then Lupita's, but he decides against and pushes further north into Antelope Valley to one of his homes. He inspects his cars to clear his mind. He decides he'll call Zavaleta tomorrow to clean them. He continues to think about the events from earlier. As he and his crew were walking toward the van, Tweetie turned around. Then Luther. They saw Hopi climbing out of the hole in the ground. Luther grabbed a nearby mangled shovel and swung the blade of the shovel down on Hopi.

=== Chapter 30: If Anything . . . [Xanther] ===
Los Angeles, California. This is the last chapter of the novel. Xanther lies in bed and remembers finding an injured hummingbird and watching it die in her hands as she tried to help it. She wonders if it understood what was happening as it died. She notices that the windows and door of her room are open, and she thinks about leaving her room but realizes she doesn't have to. She remembers reviving the kitten and thinks about Dov in his casket and knows she never thought the kitten was dead. She remembers how it sucked the breath out of her and knows it never saw her as a predator—if anything, it was the predator. She remembers how they went to a vet, and how she had been forced to leave the kitten in a box downstairs. Then she discovers that it is sleeping in bed beside her and assumes Anwar or Astair must have brought it up.

== Sequels and future ==
One Rainy Day in May was followed by four sequels that were part of the series' "first season": Volume 2: Into the Forest on October 27, 2015, Volume 3: Honeysuckle & Pain on June 14, 2016, Volume 4: Hades on February 7, 2017, and Volume 5: Redwood on October 31, 2017.

At the time One Rainy Day was released, Danielewski was already working midway through the tenth volume and anticipated completing two or three books a year, on track to possibly completing the series as soon as 2023. However, on February 2, 2018, a few months after Redwood's release, Danielewski announced on social media that Pantheon has put his series on indefinite hold because it failed to garner enough readership to justify the cost of continuing it, and thus the second season remains unreleased, leaving the series less than 20% published.
