= The Familiar, Volume 2: Into the Forest =

2015 novel by Mark Z. Danielewski

- Author: Mark Z. Danielewski
- Language: English language
- Genre: Signiconic
- Publisher: Pantheon Books
- Publication date: October 27, 2015
- Publication place: United States
- Media type: Print (Paperback)
- Pages: 880
- ISBN: 978-0375714979
- Preceded by: The Familiar, Volume 1: One Rainy Day in May
- Followed by: The Familiar, Volume 3: Honeysuckle & Pain

The Familiar, Volume 2: Into the Forest is an American novel by writer Mark Z. Danielewski. Released on October 27, 2015, it is the second of a planned 27-volume story entitled The Familiar as well as the second book of Season 1, which includes The Familiar Volumes 1–5. The book serves as a continuation of nine characters' interlocking stories introduced in the first book.

== Reception ==
Writing for NPR, Jason Sheehan described Into the Forest as "better" and "cleaner" than its predecessor: "More consistent in its chaos — its flurry of parentheticals, its screwball layout with words scattered and made into shapes, its glossy insertions of counter-textual material (pictures and illustrations, un-mated parentheses used as raindrops spattering the page)."
