= Jacob Geller =

American critic and YouTuber (born 1995)

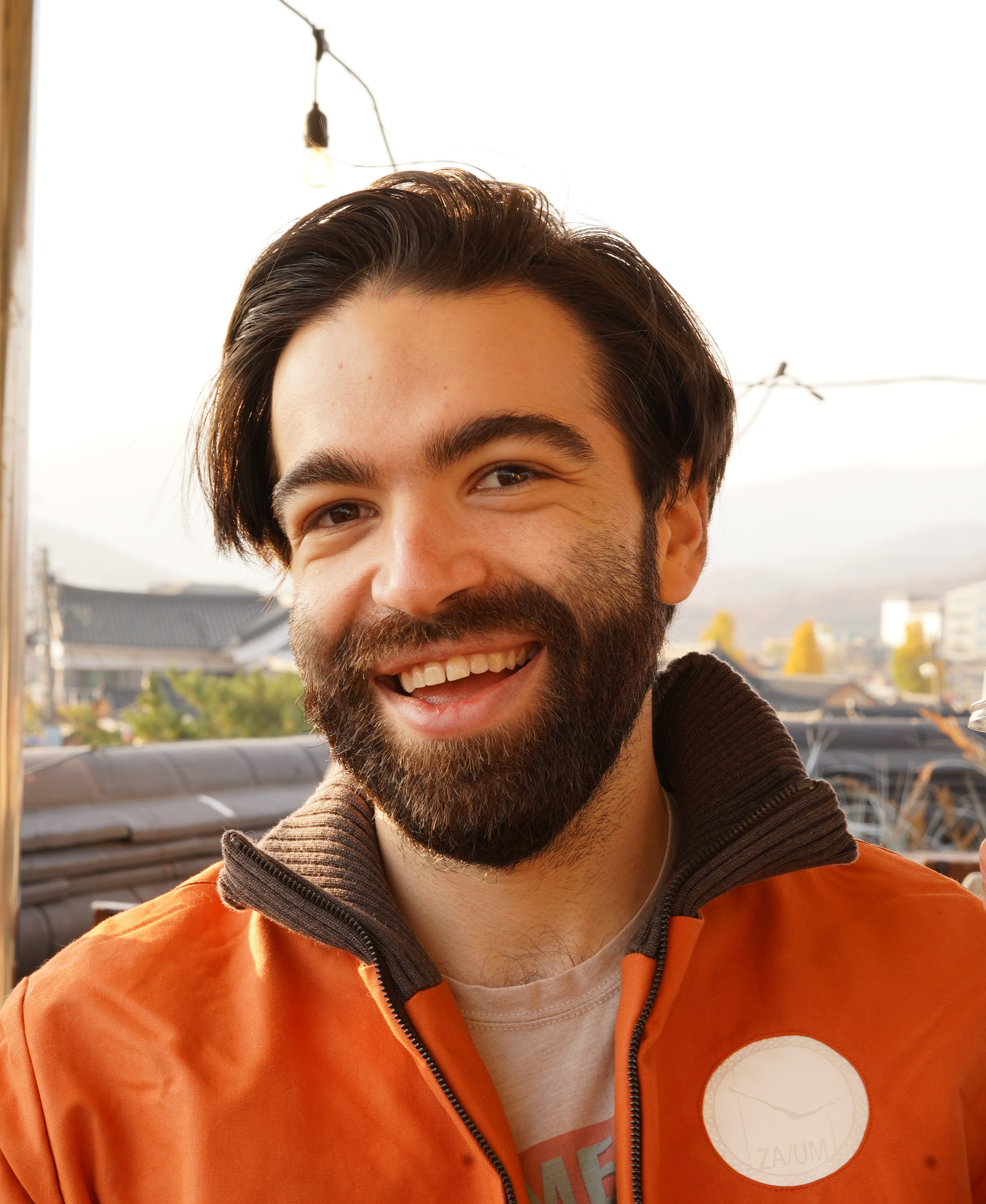
- Geller in 2022
- Born: February 8, 1995 (age 31)
- Education: University of North Carolina at Chapel Hill
- Occupations: Video essayist, writer
- Spouse: Annie Maynard (m. 2025)

YouTube information
- Channel: Jacob Geller
- Subscribers: 1.45 million
- Views: 162.2 million
- Last updated: October 15, 2026

Jacob Geller (born February 8, 1995) is an American video essayist, critic, and writer known for his analysis of video games and popular culture. Geller's YouTube channel has over 1.4 million subscribers, with videos covering topics like horror, art, and social justice. He published an annotated print collection of his essays in 2024. Geller's career has included writing for Polygon, which named his 2019 video essay "Games, Schools, and Worlds Designed for Violence" as one of the best in YouTube's history.

In October 2026, Geller was connected to a sexual assault investigation conducted at the University of North Carolina at Chapel Hill in 2016, which Geller confirmed as well as confirming his guilt in the matter. Geller's work was subsequently removed from publication by several organizations he had partnered with, and he was removed as a member of the video company MinnMax.

== Life and career ==
Jacob Geller was born on February 8, 1995. He traces his experience with video games back to his childhood and cited his Jewish upbringing and background as a basis for his writing and analysis. Geller's video essays typically compile experiences or ideas from several different sources. Geller explained in an interview that he often discovers the focus of an essay while writing it. In addition to his YouTube channel, Geller has interned for Game Informer and written for Polygon. He was a member of the video company MinnMax.

In 2024, Geller announced How a Game Lives in collaboration with independent publisher Lost In Cult. How a Game Lives is a print collection of ten of Geller's video essay scripts alongside extensive annotations by Geller, commentary by various authors, and art by Kilian Eng and others. The essays include "Fear of Cold" (2023), on frigophobia and extreme survival across culture and history; "Does Call of Duty Believe in Anything?" (2019), an ethical evaluation of Modern Warfare (2019); "Who's Afraid of Modern Art" (2019), analyzing attacks on Barnett Newman, Robert Mapplethorpe, and other contemporary artists; and "The Legacy of the Haunted House" (2019), on the role of architecture in works like Control and House of Leaves. Each essay features an afterword by writers such as Jamil Jan Kochai and Gareth Damian Martin. A foreword for the collection was contributed by speculative writer Nana Kwame Adjei-Brenyah.

In late September 2026, allegations surfaced that Geller had been fired from a job at University of North Carolina at Chapel Hill's college radio station WXYC in 2016 and suspended for one semester following a Title IX investigation regarding sexual misconduct. Geller's name appears in a list of "students who had violated the institution's sexual assault policy" that the North Carolina Supreme Court ordered the university to release in 2020. Geller confirmed the allegation in October, stating on Bluesky that he had regretted the assault and sought to improve himself since. He was removed from MinnMax and Nebula, while the podcast Cane and Rinse removed all episodes featuring Geller and Lost in Cult pulled How a Game Lives from sale and canceled his upcoming second book, You're Not Overthinking It.

== Reception ==
Geller hosting a podcast for MinnMax at the Game Developers Conference in 2026

Corinne Engber of Jewish Boston noted "The Decade-Long Quest For Shadow of the Colossus' Last Secret" (2019), a documentary work of Internet history, as the first viral success of Geller's channel, additionally naming "Judaism and Whiteness in Wolfenstein" (2019) as a personal favorite. Hyperallergic praised several of Geller's videos, including "Art in the Pre-Apocalypse" (2023), "I Want to Tell You About My Favorite Fight Scene" (2024), and "Art for No One" (2024), naming him "one of the best video essayists in the game" in 2023.

Wil Williams of Polygon named "Worlds Designed for Violence", an essay comparing the level design of cover shooter video games to the architectural renovations of Sandy Hook Elementary School following the 2012 mass shooting, as one of the best video essays on YouTube, crediting Geller with "baking sincerity, vulnerability, and so much care into his video essays." Polygon additionally noted "The Strange Reality of RollerCoaster Tycoon" and "Fixing My Brain With Automated Therapy" as among the best video essays of 2020 and 2022 respectively. Geller's work has also received mention in Kotaku.
