= Directive 8020 =

2026 video game

- Box art featuring Brianna Young, one of the game's five protagonists
- Developer: Supermassive Games
- Publisher: Supermassive Games
- Director: Will Doyle
- Composer: Jason Graves
- Series: The Dark Pictures
- Engine: Unreal Engine 5
- Platforms: PlayStation 5; Windows; Xbox Series X/S
- Release: 12 May 2026
- Genres: Interactive drama, survival horror
- Modes: Single-player, multiplayer

Directive 8020 is a 2026 interactive drama and survival horror video game developed and published by Supermassive Games. It is the fifth game in The Dark Pictures series. Taking place on a colony spaceship called Cassiopeia, the crew crash lands on Tau Ceti f, a planet 12 light-years from Earth, where they must survive a shapeshifting alien threat. Lashana Lynch, who plays astronaut and co-pilot Brianna Young, was marketed as the game's leading actress. It released for PlayStation 5, Windows, and Xbox Series X/S on 12 May.

Directive 8020 features a multilinear plot in which decisions can significantly alter the trajectory of the story and change the relationships between the five playable protagonists; some decisions lead to their permanent deaths. It also introduces a new feature called Turning Points, which allows players to rewind to a pivotal moment or decision.

The game received mixed reviews from critics, with praise going towards its improvements over its predecessors, such as the visuals, sound design, the "Turning Points" system, and its attempts to improve the gameplay, but criticised the stealth mechanics and sections, and a polarising narrative.

== Gameplay ==
Directive 8020 is an interactive drama and survival horror game presented from a third-person perspective. Player control switches between the five protagonists, the crew of a colony ship called Cassiopeia. The crew are supposed to survey Tau Ceti f from space in order to gather information for another colony ship that is traveling six months behind. Tau Ceti f is a planet that is 12 light-years from Earth, and has become humanity's last hope because Earth is dying, but the Cassiopeia crash lands onto the Tau Ceti f. The surviving crew members are scattered after being brought out of hypersleep early. The game is divided up into eight episodes that each take around an hour to complete. To build tension throughout the episodic structure, most chapters feature flashforwards that depict the characters in future life-and-death scenarios. There are "a handful" of optional objectives based on the branching of the game that can be based on previous decisions or have new consequences if the player undertakes them. In addition to immediate life-or-death choices, Directive 8020 introduces a "Destinies" system. Rather than relying solely on pass/fail action sequences, a character's overarching narrative arc and final fate are influenced by the long-term relationship dynamics they form with other crew members.

Directive 8020 features quick time events (QTEs) like the previous games in the series, but it also includes live combat in order to "increase the danger as much as possible". Creative director Will Doyle said the game is not about fighting the aliens, but about evading them with stealth because the player does not have a gun or anything like that to defend themselves. Players must stay quietly in the shadows, avoiding detection. Supermassive calls it "threatening exploration", a mechanic where characters can be killed dynamically outside of scripted story events. Doyle originally pitched this concept during the development of House of Ashes (2021), but the studio's strict annual release schedule prevented the necessary structural changes from being implemented until Directive 8020. Optionally, accessibility options include a "safe" mode that ensures players always survive the stealth sections, but can still die in other ways. The game also features multiple difficulty levels and options for players who want varying experiences. Stealth sequences feature varied scenarios, including using security cameras to safely guide another character. If an enemy detects a character during these sections, it does not always result in an immediate death; instead, the failure can trigger a new branching narrative path.

The inventory system consists of tools that are linked to a "multifunctional utility strap" on the wrists of the characters. The strap also contains a shoulder mounted flashlight, with the enemies able to spot the beam when the light is on. Other tools include a scanner that can scan for electronics or be used to spot an alien that is capable of mimicking the appearances of the crew, a "wedge tool" that can be used to open a door as a last resort or to stun an enemy, a text messenger, and a remote control that lets the player hack computers from a distance. Character movement has been reworked to feel "smoother on the sticks" according to Doyle, allowing characters to sprint and vault over obstacles while exploring the ship.

The game introduces Turning Points, which is a feature that allows players to rewind to a pivotal moment or decision. Optionally, players can go the traditional Dark Pictures route and play survival mode which prevents rewinding, but still enables players to view the decision trees. Executive producer Dan McDonald said that Turning Points were added due to the new threat in exploration which adds more chances for a character to die and Supermassive felt that could lead to frustration for players who just want to explore. The feature was also implemented to mitigate player frustration regarding the game's mimic enemies. Because a character can secretly be replaced by a mimic for a significant portion of the game without the player realising, the rewind system allows players to undo long-term mistakes that lead to bleak endings. Turning Points do not overwrite progress, so players can continue where they were if they do not like what they did. The Curator does not have a large role in the game, being more in the background despite his connections to the series, with McDonald saying "the Curator's office with all its leather and books and maps didn't mesh as well with Directive 8020's setting."

The multiplayer mode "Movie Night" returns from the previous games in the series. It accommodates up to five players in couch co-op or for the first time in the series, the mode can be played online. Players can also mix and match between couch co-op and online. The online version will be added as a free update post launch on all platforms.

== Synopsis ==
=== Setting and prologue ===
In the 2060s, the Corinth corporation constructs a pair of interstellar colonisation vessels, the Cassiopeia and Andromeda, to explore and colonise the planet Tau Ceti f. The Cassiopeia is scheduled to arrive first to survey the planet, with the Andromeda following six months later. Near the end of the Cassiopeia's four year voyage, the ship is struck by a meteorite that breaches the hull and introduces an unknown organic growth into the vessel. The game's prologue follows Tomas Carter and Pari Simms, who are overseeing the ship while the rest of the crew remains in hypersleep. The pair investigate the damage and are later separated; when Carter eventually reunites with Simms, she behaves erratically and murders him.

=== Characters ===
The game's five protagonists are Brianna Young (Lashana Lynch), an astronaut and co-pilot of the colony ship Cassiopeia; the ship's commander, Nolan Stafford (Danny Sapani); senior mission officer Laura Eisele (Lotte Verbeek); medical specialist Samantha Cooper (Anna Leong Brophy); and technical engineer Josef Cernan (Philip Arditti). Other crew members consist of sleep technicians Tomas Carter (Frank Blake) and Pari Simms (Anneika Rose), pilot Noah Mitchell (Colin Bates), and science officer Zoe Anders (Kathryn Wilder). They are also accompanied by LaMarcus Williams (Kobna Holdbrook-Smith), the CEO of the Corinth megacorporation that is funding the Cassiopeia mission.

Directive 8020 centres around the paranoia and fracturing trust among the Cassiopeia crew. Tension is heightened by a hostile, shapeshifting alien organism capable of perfectly mimicking the crew members, forcing them into a constant state of suspicion regarding each other's true identities. Furthermore, the narrative explores themes of corporate exploitation; the protagonists' struggle for survival is framed against the revelation that Corinth CEO LaMarcus Williams views the crew as disposable, having intentionally sent unwitting clone crews to their deaths merely to observe and research the alien organism.

=== Main plot ===
Two days later, Stafford, Young, Eisele, and Mitchell are awakened as planned. Though Simms reports she is still repairing the hull breach, Carter remains missing. Suspicious, Eisele spots Simms and attempts to follow her, only for Simms to attempt to murder her. Eisele manages to escape and discovers Carter's mutilated corpse. The crew is shocked at Carter's death, but have to prepare to decelerate the Cassiopeia to enter Tau Ceti f's orbit. Unfortunately, the alien growth disables the ship's control systems, causing it to crash land on Tau Ceti f and potentially killing Stafford. The rest of the crew are then awakened and briefed on the situation, and they decide to search the ship for Simms. Cooper and Anders team up, and can possibly find a recording left behind by Simms stating that all data from the previous unmanned Charybdis expedition has been locked down, as well as a recording left by Carter that confirms Simms murdered him. The crew continues their search, eventually discovering the alien growth spreading through the ship. Despite Anders' protests, Williams orders the crew to retrieve a sample for research.

After assessing the damage to the ship, the crew determines their only hope of survival is holding out until the Andromeda arrives in six months. While Cernan tries to repair communications and Anders studies the alien growth, Young and Cooper continue the hunt for Simms, where Young potentially discovers Simms' corpse. They manage to kill the imposter Simms, but the alien growth continues to spread through the entire ship. After the lab and hydroponics are mysteriously sabotaged, preventing experimentation on how to destroy the alien growth and limiting the ship's air supply, the crew are shocked to discover that the alien growth has been creating copies of them that suddenly begin attacking. Any surviving crew flee to the bridge, which contains the only scanner capable of proving they are human. After taking refuge in the bridge, they are contacted by a drone from a Charybdis probe. Realizing that they can use the probe's transmitter to send a message to the Andromeda, they head out to repair it, finding that the alien growth is also present on the planet's surface. The crew manages to send out a transmission, but are alarmed to find messages sent from previous versions of themselves as well as the wrecks of other Cassiopeia ships.

The surviving crew receive a transmission from Young on Earth, who reveals that the crew of the Cassiopeia are in fact clones, and that there is no Andromeda following them. Earth knew about the existence of the alien lifeform but covered it up, sending a chain of Cassiopeia ships with cloned crews as expendable test subjects to study the lifeform. If Williams and Anders have survived unscathed, Anders persuades Williams to reveal that the coordinates of Tau Ceti f were retrieved from a crashed UFO discovered in Iraq in 2003, (Note: As depicted in The Dark Pictures Anthology: House of Ashes) which led directly to the Charybdis expedition. The original Young then thanks the crew for their contributions for finding a countermeasure to the alien lifeform, and may inform them that the Cassiopeia of a previous cycle (Cycle 3) is still intact and in orbit. Not content to sit around and wait to die, the crew decides to use the ship's shuttle to escape the planet, heading to the Cycle 3 Cassiopeia to use it to return to Earth or seeking refuge at their Cassiopeia's booster ring in orbit, which still contains enough oxygen and supplies that can hopefully last until the next Cassiopeia arrives. The aliens attempt to stop them, with the surviving crew either dying or managing to escape with the chance of accidentally bringing imposters with them. Regardless of the outcome, the next Cassiopeia ship arrives three months later to begin their own mission, possibly receiving a warning left by the previous crew.

In a post-credits scene, the original Eisele reports to her superiors on an ecologically ravaged Earth. "Cycle 13" demonstrated that the alien lifeform is capable of intercepting the Cassiopeia in space. She points out that humanity's only chance of survival is learning how to control the alien lifeform so they can make use of its abilities. Depending on her choices made throughout the game, Eisele can either suggest to continue sending clone crews to achieve results, or to discontinue the use of clones for humanitarian reasons.

== Development ==
Directive 8020 was originally planned as the fifth instalment in a series of eight games for The Dark Pictures. However, McDonald confirmed in April 2026 that the studio is no longer strictly adhering to an eight-game cap. The roadmap shifted significantly during development, resulting in Directive 8020 absorbing a second planned space-themed title and merging both concepts into a single, larger game. Directive 8020 was also originally going to be the first game in the anthology's second season, but Supermassive revealed in June 2025 that they were moving away from the season format to focus on the game as a standalone title. The multi-year gap following the first season of the anthology allowed the development team to transition the series to Unreal Engine 5 for a visual upgrade. By de-emphasising the Dark Pictures branding, Supermassive are seeking to "bring The Dark Pictures to a wider audience" according to Doyle. By mid-October 2022, the game was entering production with a lot of data already shot.

Unlike the previous games in the series, Supermassive took the time to examine individual systems and then rebuilt some of them from scratch, including the camera which is now fully under player control. With the added stealth elements of the game, character control was updated which made them "smoother than in our previous games" according to Doyle. He also added that these stealth sections were designed to be used sparingly to give players "breathing room" between traditional narrative segments. For the Turning Points flowcharts, McDonald added that the team first decided on who the characters were and the arc they wanted them to go on, then they started to build out the charts. Supermassive used a "storyboard tool" that allowed for quick construction of the charts by adding storyboard images into each node so the team could "sit and play the storyboard through, multiple times, and see the different end states and how characters change from it". The concept for Turning Points was influenced by player data; the studio found that players often abandoned previous games entirely if a favourite character died early on, so the rewind system was implemented to respect players' time. The developers also sought to minimise "plot armour" by ensuring that even early character deaths serve a specific purpose in the story. Because of the game's branching scripts, actors were typically only given a sample of one narrative throughline to prepare, and were often surprised during recording sessions to learn their characters could be killed off in the first act.

=== Story and design ===
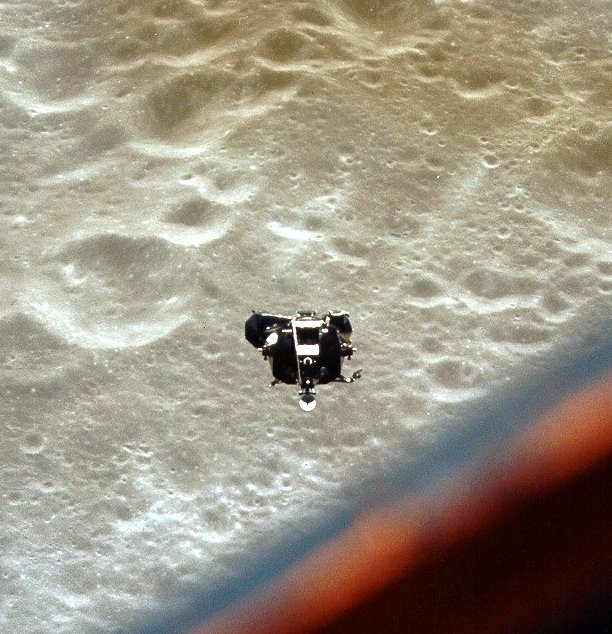
Apollo 10's Lunar Module, Snoopy. The mission of the Cassiopeia is based on Apollo 10, as both missions involved orbiting without landing. Three of the game's protagonists also share surnames with the Apollo 10 crew: Cernan, Stafford, and Young.

Directive 8020, like previous entries in the series, was designed to be a standalone story, but all of the games are in a shared universe, so Supermassive included easter eggs that refer to other games in the series. Doyle described Directive 8020 as "The Thing in deep space", citing further inspiration from H. P. Lovecraft's cosmic horror and sci-fi horror films such as Solaris (1972), Alien (1979), Event Horizon (1997), Pandorum (2009), Prometheus (2012), Life (2017), and Sputnik (2020). Expanding on these cinematic influences, McDonald stated that the game's design was also heavily inspired by the Star Trek and Star Wars franchises, specifically regarding the precision required during astronaut operations and the close-knit relationships formed among spacefarers. The game's title is inspired by NASA directive 8020.7G, which was about biological contamination control for outbound and inbound planetary spacecraft. McDonald said Apollo 10, was a "dress rehearsal" for the eventual moon landing, and added that the crew of the Cassiopeia were given a similar order. He further compared Apollo 10 and the Cassiopeia mission in that the Apollo 10 crew were sent just to fly around the moon and then return, and the Cassiopeia crew has similar orders to not land on Tau Ceti f. Doyle stated that much like the rumoured rationale for the Apollo 10 mission, the Cassiopeia was intentionally short-fueled to prevent the crew from being tempted to land, which ultimately leaves them stranded when they crash on the planet.

McDonald said the team leaned into body horror with Directive 8020 in order to "conjure up some truly horrible forms" for the Hunter. There are different designs of it throughout the game including when it is half-transformed into a human which McDonald called "really nasty". The design of the Hunter was changed multiple times, with the team taking advantage of the extra time they had between game releases to "iterate and make it as good as it needs to be".

=== Casting ===
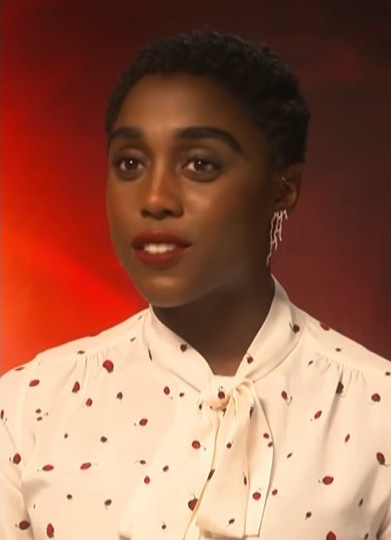
Lashana Lynch (pictured in 2019), who plays Brianna Young, is being marketed as the game's leading actress.

Directive 8020 continues the trend of the series by casting a recognizable face as the lead character. Doyle said they were lucky to have Lynch and that she brought "incredible power and depth" to the role of Brianna Young. Doyle said the team "pinched themselves" when Lynch was cast, adding "she was already big when we acquired her for this, so we got really lucky. She was brilliant". The team was looking for a talented British actor when they cast Lynch and she was "gracious and game for everything". Danny Sapani plays the captain of the Cassiopeia, Commander Stafford. In an interview with the developers, Lynch recounted her experiences while acting for Directive 8020 and expressed excitement about her role as a pilot in the game:

I want to do a game, I want to play a strong character, I want to play a pilot again, I want it to be colourful. And it was all of those things rolled in one. So I didn't have a choice. It kind of screamed at me really ... I've never done motion capture. [I] have always wanted to do it just from seeing videos of actors in their bubbly leotards and look what comes of it. You know, it's incredible work ... It's truly a horror, so being able to play that, which I've never done before, is really exciting. There's a lot of running, a lot of looking behind your shoulder, you know, wondering what's there.

=== Music ===
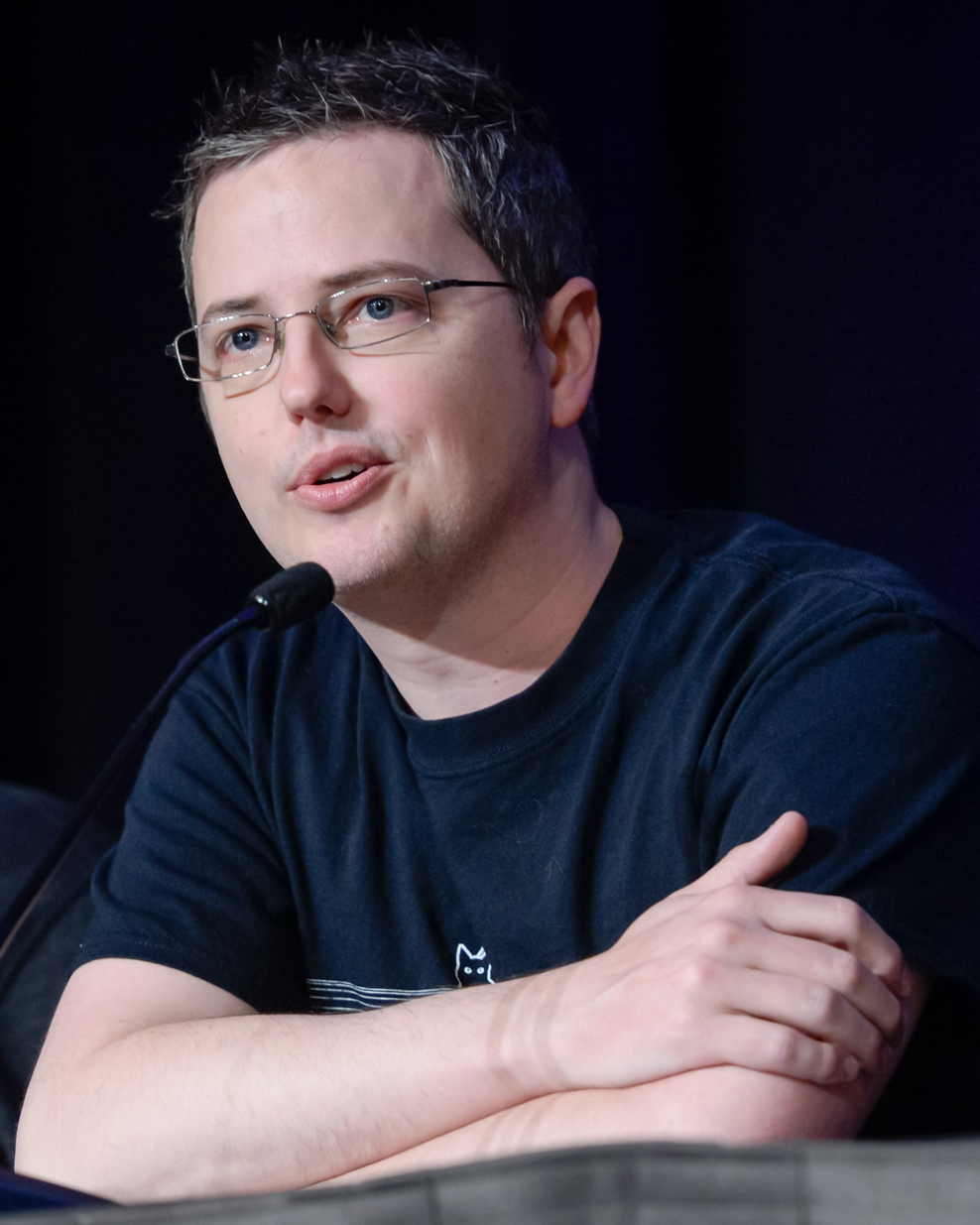
Jason Graves (pictured in 2016) reprises his role as composer for The Dark Pictures.

The soundtrack was composed by Supermassive Games' long-time collaborator Jason Graves, who previously worked on music for the previous games in The Dark Pictures.

=== Release ===
The game's title was one of six Dark Pictures trademarks listed on the European Union Intellectual Property Office in early 2022. Directive 8020 was first revealed in a post-credits teaser trailer at the end of The Devil in Me, which was released on 18 November 2022. The trailer leaked online the day before The Devil in Me's release, revealing the sci-fi setting. On 31 December 2023, a short video teaser for the game was posted to celebrate New Year's Eve. At Gamescom in August 2024, the game was officially announced. In June 2025, the Digital Deluxe Edition of the game was revealed, which includes a Dark Pictures outfit pack, a cosmic visual filters pack, a digital artbook, a digital soundtrack, and an exclusive collectible heirlooms mission. Directive 8020 was originally scheduled to be released on 2 October 2025 for PlayStation 5, Windows, and Xbox Series X/S. In July 2025, Supermassive announced a wave of layoffs and that the game was delayed. In February 2026, it was announced that the game would release on 12 May 2026. Pre-ordering the game gives players access to the Deluxe Edition, which contains an outfit pack featuring costumes inspired by previous entries in The Dark Pictures franchise, The Dark Pictures Collectables, which are in-game items to find, the Cinematic Filter Pack, the digital soundtrack, and a digital artbook.

== Reception ==
Reception

Aggregate scores
Aggregator	Score
Metacritic	PC: 72/100; PS5: 72/100; XSXS: 68/100
OpenCritic	53% recommend

Review scores
Publication	Score
Eurogamer	3/5
Game Informer	5/10
GameSpot	5/10
GamesRadar+	3/5
IGN	8/10
PC Gamer (US)	85/100
Push Square	5/10
RPGFan	91/100
Shacknews	8/10
TechRadar	3.5/5

Directive 8020 received "mixed or average" reception, according to the review aggregator website Metacritic, while 53% of critics recommended the game according to OpenCritic. The expanded character destinies and relationship mechanics were viewed favourably, with Meg Pelliccio of TheGamer stating these additions provided the greatest depth of any installment in the series. The central performances, particularly those of Lashana Lynch and Anna Leong Brophy, were frequently highlighted as captivating; however, Polygon and TheGamer felt the overall immersion was hindered by unconvincing supporting deliveries and stiff character animations. The overarching storyline also divided critics. IGN and RPGFan felt the game successfully captured the paranoiac chills of classic science fiction horror, with Elie Gould of PC Gamer specifically commending the execution of its sci-fi body horror elements. Conversely, Game Informer considered the homages to films like Alien to be derivative rip-offs, and TheGamer found the plot largely predictable until its final act.

The updated inventory system was viewed favourably by Matt Wales of Eurogamer for trimming the excesses of previous games to create a tighter progression. Conversely, the introduction of a dedicated stealth system faced significant criticism. Reviewers found the mechanics to be rudimentary and repetitive, arguing that predictable enemy patterns and easily exploited pathing undermined the intended tension. GamesRadar+'s Jasmine Gould-Wilson similarly called the system's implementation inconsistent. Paul Skevington of RPGFan found the suspense of navigating darkened environments to be highly effective despite the mechanical simplicity, and TheGamer acknowledged the core concept held strong potential for future iterations. Despite the broader mechanical critiques, Kyle Hilliard of Game Informer commended the game's environmental detail and art direction as its strongest elements.

The Turning Points rewind feature was praised for respecting players' time and allowing for the quick reversal of fatal mistakes. The system's execution faced scrutiny. Vic Hood of TechRadar described navigating the branching decision paths as cumbersome, while Ford James of Polygon argued that the ability to freely rewind lowered the overarching narrative stakes. Technical issues were also reported, which included broken messaging mechanics and progression softlocks. Mashable's Chance Townsend concluded that the interactive elements were often considered more compelling in theory than in execution.
