= The Dark Pictures Anthology: Man of Medan =

2019 video game

- Box art featuring Conrad, one of the game's five protagonists
- Developer: Supermassive Games
- Publisher: Bandai Namco Entertainment
- Director: Tom Heaton
- Producer: Dan McDonald
- Designers: Dave Grove; Ollie Clarke-Smith
- Programmer: Prasanna Jeganathan
- Artist: Robert Craig
- Writers: Graham Reznick; Larry Fessenden
- Composer: Jason Graves
- Series: The Dark Pictures Anthology
- Engine: Unreal Engine 4
- Platforms: PlayStation 4; Windows; Xbox One; PlayStation 5; Xbox Series X/S; Nintendo Switch
- Release: PS4, Win, XONE 30 August 2019; PS5, Xbox Series X/S 27 September 2022; Nintendo Switch 4 May 2023
- Genres: Interactive drama; Survival horror
- Modes: Single-player, multiplayer

The Dark Pictures Anthology: Man of Medan is a 2019 interactive drama and survival horror video game developed by Supermassive Games and published by Bandai Namco Entertainment. It is the first game of The Dark Pictures Anthology. Man of Medan is set in the South Pacific Ocean and follows four college students and their boat captain who embark on a diving expedition to find a sunken World War II plane. Pirates hijack their vessel and strand the group aboard a ghost ship, where they must survive visions of ghostly figures. The game features gameplay elements, including quick time events, two single-player and two multiplayer modes, and collectables that allow the player to see visions of possible future events. It also has a multilinear plot where decisions can alter the trajectory of the story and change the relationships between the five playable protagonists; some lead to their permanent deaths.

The developers drew primary inspiration for the premise from the urban legend of the SS Ourang Medan, a fabled ghost ship. They also looked to films, including The Shining, Ghost Ship, Triangle, and Insidious, to establish the game's psychological tension. Supermassive built the game on Unreal Engine 4 to facilitate a multi-platform release and expanded the branching narrative scope relative to their previous game, Until Dawn. Shawn Ashmore, who plays a member of the diving group named Conrad, was marketed as the game's leading actor. Jason Graves composed the soundtrack, designing the music to reflect the swaying waves of the sea.

Man of Medan was released for PlayStation 4, Windows, and Xbox One on 30 August 2019, to mixed reviews. Critics commended the cooperative multiplayer modes and the adaptable branching narrative, but directed criticism towards its technical shortcomings, controls, and plot developments. The second game in the series, Little Hope, was revealed in a teaser trailer at the end of Man of Medan and released on 30 October 2020. Versions of Man of Medan for PlayStation 5 and Xbox Series X/S were released in September 2022, followed by a Nintendo Switch version in May 2023.

== Gameplay ==
Interacting with collectable pictures, such as a black-framed one that a character named Fliss finds in a boat, triggers a premonition of what may happen later in the game. Whether or not the vision comes true depends on player actions.

The Dark Pictures Anthology: Man of Medan is an interactive drama and survival horror game played from a third-person perspective. Player control switches between five protagonists who become trapped on board a ghost ship. The game uses fixed camera angles, which require the player to navigate the ship's claustrophobic environments.

Throughout the story, the player makes decisions that change the course of the narrative. The player manages the relationships between the protagonists; choosing dialogue options and actions determines whether they cooperate or act selfishly, which directly impacts their chances of survival. When prompted to make a choice, the interface is stylised as a compass, which provides two distinct dialogue responses, plus an option to remain silent. The player is asked to approach these choices from either a rational or emotional perspective. These choices influence the characters' assigned personality traits and alter their relationships with one another. A menu system called Bearings tracks the narrative branches and allows the player to retrospectively view the consequences of their actions.

Action sequences primarily rely on quick time events (QTEs). These include pressing specific buttons within a short time limit to dodge obstacles or perform physical tasks, as well as rhythm-based minigames where the player must press buttons in time with a character's heartbeat to remain hidden. Failing these events can result in immediate consequences, which can include the permanent death of a protagonist. The narrative adapts to these losses so that the game continues until the conclusion, regardless of how many characters survive. Interspersed throughout the narrative are scenes featuring the Curator, a character who breaks the fourth wall to discuss the player's choices and occasionally offer cryptic hints.

While navigating the vessel, the player can examine environmental clues such as abandoned papers, letters, journals, and official memos; these items are classified as Secrets, which reveal the history of the ship and can help save the characters' lives. The player can discover collectable pictures scattered across the environments. Interacting with these pictures triggers a premonition, granting the player a brief vision of a possible future event. These pictures are categorised by the colour of their frames: white-framed pictures foretell a positive outcome or a character's survival, and black-framed pictures warn of a possible character death.

The main single-player campaign is the Theatrical Cut, while the other single player mode, the Curator's Cut, offers an alternative version of the story that features different scenes and character perspectives. The game also includes two multiplayer modes: Shared Story allows two players to experience the campaign cooperatively online. The two players may be controlling characters in completely different areas of the ship simultaneously, which means one player's choices can impact the narrative and survival of the other. Movie Night is a local multiplayer mode where up to five players select their own characters and pass the controller to one another when their respective turns arise.

== Synopsis ==
=== Setting and prologue ===
Man of Medan's plot centres around the urban legend of the SS Ourang Medan, a ghost ship allegedly found adrift in the 1940s. The game's prologue takes place in 1947 aboard the freighter after it departs from Manchuria. The ship's cargo includes Manchurian Gold, a hallucinogenic bioweapon developed during World War II. When the chemical containers leak, the crew is subjected to hallucinations; driven mad by apparitions, the sailors inadvertently kill each other or succumb to fear, which leaves the vessel to drift in the South Pacific Ocean. Following the prologue, the Curator introduces himself to the player and outlines the story's premise.

=== Characters ===
The game's five protagonists are brothers Alex (Kareem Alleyne) and Brad (Chris Sandiford); Alex's girlfriend, Julia (Arielle Palik); Julia's brother, Conrad (Shawn Ashmore); and Fliss (Ayisha Issa), the captain of the Duke of Milan.

Man of Medan revolves around three main interpersonal dynamics: Alex and Julia's established romantic relationship, Conrad's interactions with Fliss, and the fraternal bond between Alex and Brad. Alex is considering proposing to Julia during the diving trip, a decision that influences their interactions throughout the story. Conrad frequently clashes with Fliss; depending on the narrative branches, their friction can either escalate or develop into a flirtation. The brothers' relationship is driven by their contrasting personalities; Alex is portrayed as outwardly confident but insecure, while Brad struggles with social awkwardness among the group.

=== Main plot ===
In the present day, the protagonists' diving expedition in the South Pacific Ocean is interrupted when their boat is ambushed by a group of pirates led by a man named Olson. They discover coordinates for a rumoured treasure called Manchurian Gold, so Olson takes the group hostage and forces Fliss to navigate to the location. The Duke of Milan ends up colliding with the drifting Ourang Medan. The pirates board the freighter and steal the Duke's distributor cap to prevent their captives from escaping.

The protagonists break free and attempt to retrieve the part, but they are separated in the ship's dark corridors. As they explore, both the protagonists and the pirates begin experiencing hallucinations of ghosts and undead sailors. The characters must evade both the panicking pirates and the perceived supernatural threats. The surviving protagonists regroup and reach the ship's radio room, where they can choose to contact the military for extraction. They reactivate the power and figure out that the ship is leaking Manchurian Gold gas, which is the source of the hallucinations.

The protagonists confront a hallucinating Olson in the ship's cargo hold. Following a final struggle, Olson is killed and the protagonists attempt to secure the distributor cap. The remaining survivors reunite on the outer deck. The story's conclusion depends on the player's previous actions: if the distributor cap was saved, the group repairs the Duke of Milan and escapes. If the cap is destroyed, they are stranded. They are either left to drift at sea, or, if they successfully broadcast their coordinates, the military arrives; depending on what the survivors discovered, the soldiers will either rescue them or execute them to protect the bioweapon's secret.

== Development ==
Supermassive began development on Man of Medan following the success of Until Dawn (2015). They recognised that there was a substantial market for interactive dramas and horror games, so the studio sought to expand the concept to a wider audience. This ambition led to the creation of The Dark Pictures Anthology, a series of standalone horror games, with Man of Medan serving as the debut instalment of what was originally planned to consist of eight games, releasing on a biannual schedule. (Note: Supermassive's Dan McDonald stated in April 2026 that the original roadmap had shifted, so the studio was no longer adhering to an eight game limit.) Supermassive transitioned away from the proprietary Decima engine used for Until Dawn, and instead opted to build Man of Medan in Unreal Engine 4 for a multi-platform release. The studio retained approximately half of the team from their previous title to maintain consistency, and appointed Tom Heaton as the game's director.

=== Story and design ===
Supermassive designed Man of Medan to be a standalone story; although the anthology's games exist within a shared universe, the developers intended for the player to be able to experience the stories in any order they choose. The team created the Curator to serve as the connective tissue across the series; the character has been compared to Rod Serling's role in The Twilight Zone and the Crypt Keeper from Tales from the Crypt (1989–1996). The developers sought to remind the player that every decision carries permanent consequences when conceptualising the interactive mechanics. They designed the choice interface to be prominent and obtrusive, which functions as a psychological cue that forces the player to pause and weigh whether they should act on their emotional instincts or tactically calculate the best way to keep the characters alive.

The developers also expanded the branching narrative scope to emphasise replayability; while Until Dawn featured 38 potential character deaths, the developers programmed Man of Medan with 69 unique death scenes. They managed this increased volume by holding judgement-free "death meetings" to brainstorm scenarios that were violent and unexpected. Heaton explained that simply killing characters was easy, but the challenge was designing deaths that suited a character's specific personality or weaknesses, often employing dark humour or dramatic irony. The developers also established strict content boundaries; they avoided coercive elements and overly explicit gore by pulling the camera away at the last moment. The studio condensed the overall length of a single playthrough to approximately five hours to encourage the player to explore alternate outcomes. Supermassive structured the pacing to mirror a television episode rather than a feature-length film to ensure that the game could be comfortably completed in a single sitting. The team decided to add multiplayer modes to the game after observing the unexpected popularity of Until Dawn among online streamers playing with friends.

The primary inspiration for the game's premise was the urban legend of the SS Ourang Medan, a Dutch freighter allegedly found adrift in the Indian Ocean during the late 1940s. According to the myth, the ship's entire crew was discovered dead with horrified expressions and no visible injuries, shortly before the vessel mysteriously exploded and sank. For the game's narrative, the developers reimagined the ship as an American military vessel in the Pacific Ocean transporting a hallucinogenic bioweapon from Manchuria to San Francisco. The team drew additional inspiration from a variety of films, including The Shining (1980), Ghost Ship (2002), Triangle (2009), and Insidious (2010), to establish the game's atmosphere and psychological tension.

=== Casting ===
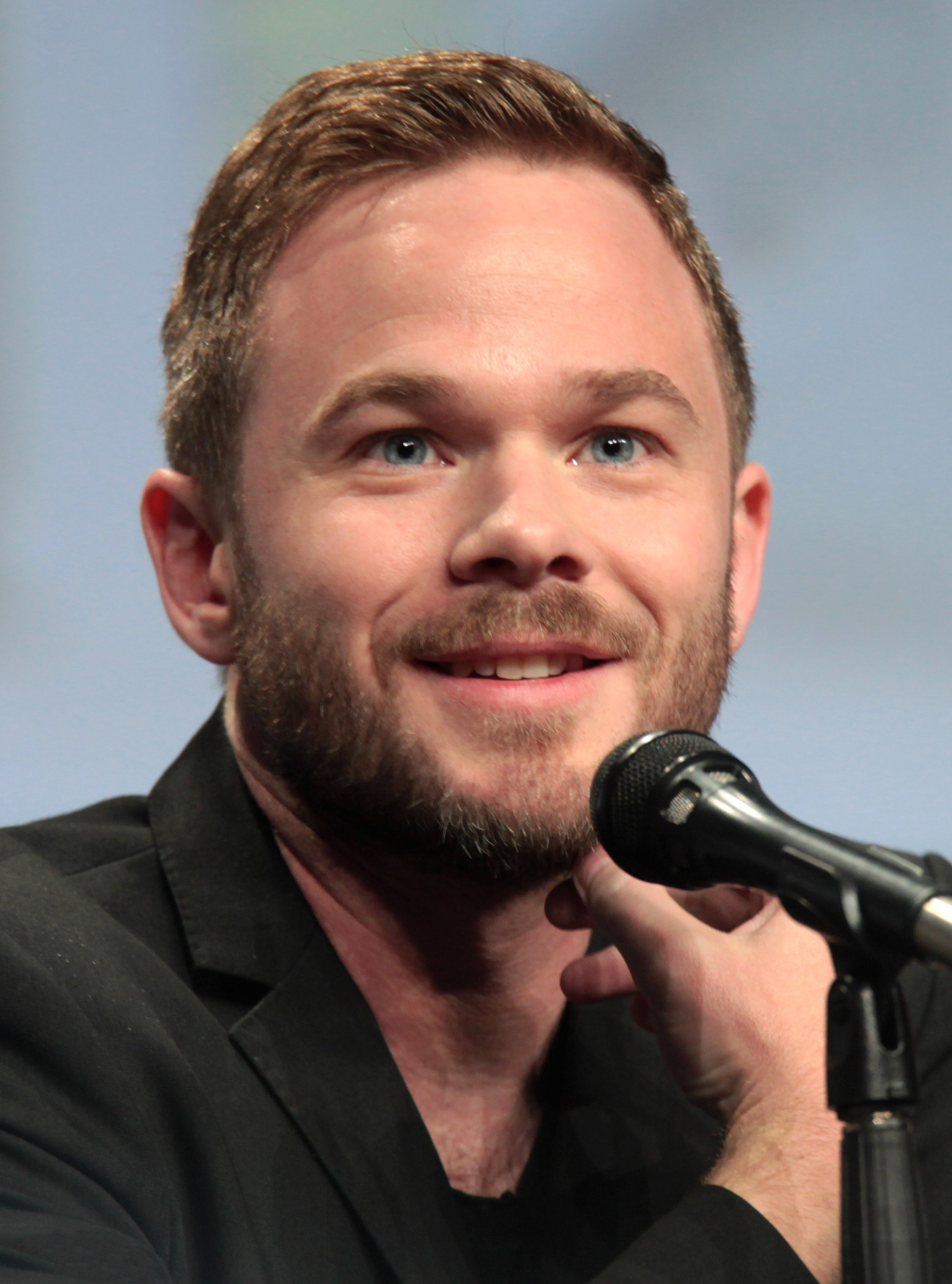
Shawn Ashmore (pictured in 2014), who plays Conrad, was marketed as the game's leading actor.

Supermassive designed their motion capture process to capture the actors' physical performances. For Man of Medan, they cast Shawn Ashmore to portray Conrad and marketed him as the game's leading actor. British actor Pip Torrens was cast to provide the voice and motion capture for the Curator. Heaton explained that the studio designed their motion capture process to give the actors the physical freedom to move around the set and develop their characters. The studio collaborated with the facial animation specialists Cubic Motion to translate the actors' performances into the game engine. The motion capture process required physical performances from the actors, particularly for the game's death scenarios. Ashmore recalled having to "scream and run", throwing himself on the ground to capture the necessary movements. He singled out two favourite death scenes for his character: one that reflected Conrad's weaknesses and "proclivities", and another that was so unexpected he initially assumed the developers were joking when they pitched it. In an interview with the developers, explained that he enjoyed starring in a horror project and appreciated how the game's branching narrative allows players to sculpt their own stories. He singled out the dynamic nature of his role, as player choices directly determine whether Conrad becomes a heroic figure or acts out of self-preservation.

=== Music and sound design ===
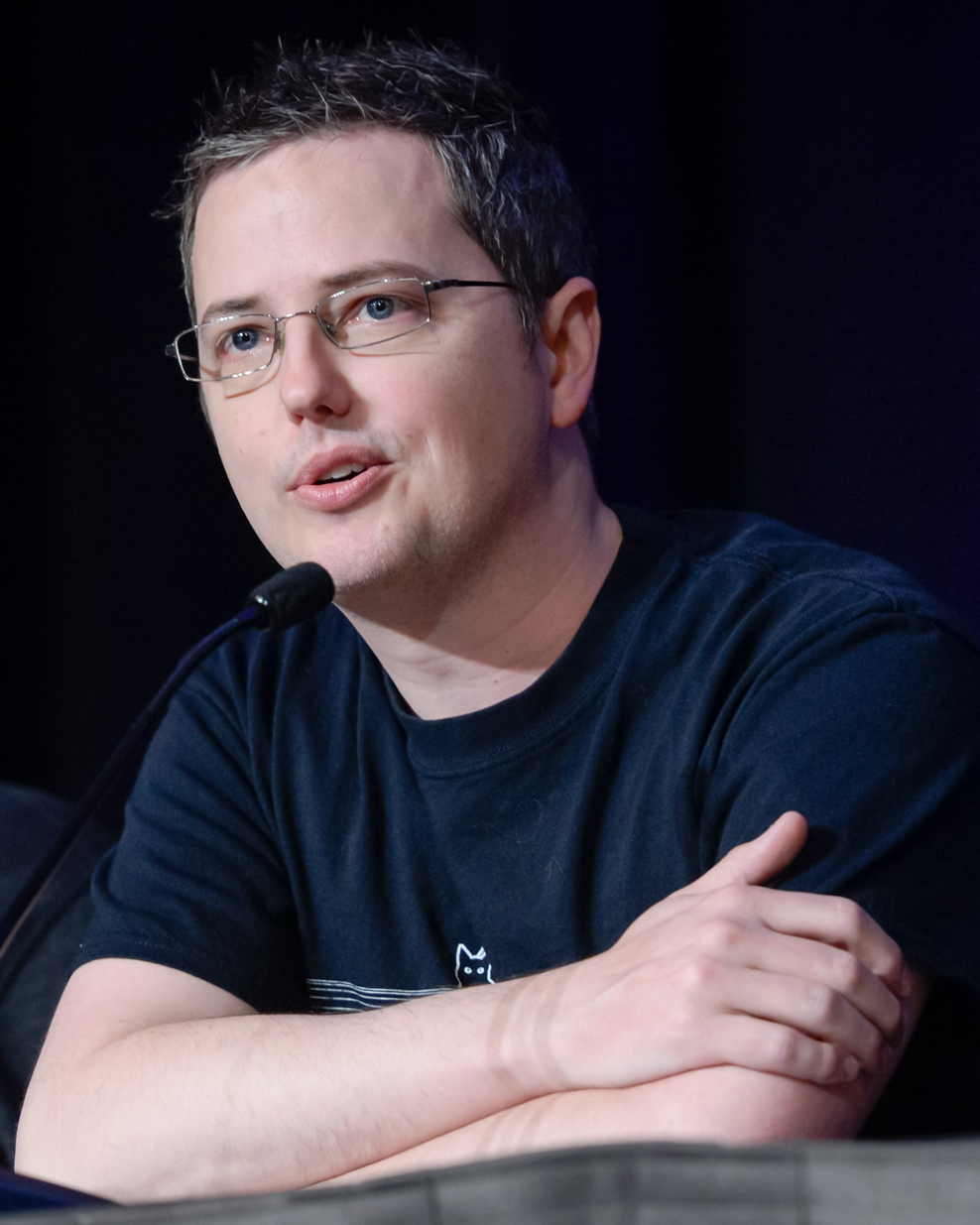
Jason Graves (pictured in 2016) composed the musical score, marking his return to collaborate with Supermassive.

A frequent collaborator with Supermassive, Jason Graves returned to compose the musical score for Man of Medan. Audio director Barney Pratt revealed that the sound team focused on the characters' youth and the swaying waves of the sea. Graves conceptualised the score using a triple metre rhythm to reflect this motion. He intended this design to subtly lull the player and to create a contrast with the game's horror elements. Graves focused the music on emphasising isolation and suspense. He designed the score to be more dynamic and interactive than his previous work on Until Dawn to accommodate the multiplayer modes and single-player choices. He did not play the game while composing; instead, Pratt sent him captured gameplay footage, which Graves looped in the background to ensure the score had enough dynamic parts to adapt to the player's choices.

Pratt and the audio team gained access to a military vessel from the World War II era to ensure the Ourang Medan sounded authentic. They recorded the sounds of heavy door latches and ambient room tones to use for the game's foley. The team also recorded audio impulses in various locations, including the engine room. They used this data to replicate the acoustic reverb of a 1940s ship within the game engine.

=== Release ===
Man of Medan was announced on 21 August 2018. The game was released for PlayStation 4, Windows, and Xbox One on 30 August 2019. Players who pre-ordered the game received early access to the Curator's Cut, which was made available to all players for free in November 2019. A post-credits teaser trailer at the end of the game revealed the next instalment in the anthology, Little Hope, which was released on 30 October 2020. Supermassive released PlayStation 5 and Xbox Series X/S versions of the game on 27 September 2022, alongside a patch for all versions that included new content, quality-of-life features, and accessibility options. A Nintendo Switch version was released on 4 May 2023. In the United Kingdom, Man of Medan debuted as the third best-selling game on the all-formats physical charts during its launch week.

== Reception ==
=== Critical response ===
Reception

Aggregate scores
Aggregator	Score
Metacritic	PC: 75/100; PS4: 69/100; XONE: 69/100
OpenCritic	45% recommend

Review scores
Publication	Score
Adventure Gamers	4/5
Destructoid	7/10
Electronic Gaming Monthly	3/5
Game Informer	7/10
GameRevolution	2.5/5
GameSpot	6/10
GamesRadar+	3.5/5
Hardcore Gamer	3/5
IGN	7/10
PC Gamer (US)	81/100
Push Square	5/10
Shacknews	6/10
USgamer	3/5
VG247	3/5

Man of Medan received "generally favourable" reception for Windows and "mixed or average" reception for PlayStation 4 and Xbox One, according to the review aggregator website Metacritic, while 45% of critics recommended the game according to OpenCritic. Reviewers generally appreciated the claustrophobic atmosphere and environmental design of the Ourang Medan. The narrative divided critics. Several writers argued that the central plot twist became obvious too early, which diminished the tension. James O'Connor of GameSpot elaborated that once the illusion breaks, it transforms the second half of the story into a less engaging experience. Several reviewers felt the pacing of the final act was rushed and argued that certain narrative branches conclude abruptly without a satisfying climax or a definitive final encounter. The cast also received mixed reactions; while some critics enjoyed the B-movie campiness of the ensemble, others characterised the protagonists as grating or underdeveloped compared to the cast of Until Dawn.

Several critics cited the multiplayer modes as the game's strongest asset. Reviewers commended the Shared Story mode for its approach to cooperative horror, as it splits players up and gives them different information to manipulate their perspectives. James Davenport of PC Gamer praised how the mode used a lack of communication, which created suspense when players are separated and forced to make blind decisions that impact their partner. The Movie Night mode received praise for successfully translating the pass-the-controller experience of Until Dawn into an official mechanic. Reviewers also responded positively to the volume of branching paths and potential character deaths.

Man of Medan faced criticism for its technical performance. Reviewers cited severe frame rate drops, texture pop-in, and stuttering audio, which occasionally interfered with the player's ability to complete QTEs. The rhythm-based heartbeat minigame also polarised critics; while some found it successfully induced panic, others criticised it as overly unforgiving or less intuitive than the motion-based mechanics of Supermassive's previous games. The character movement and camera design frustrated several critics. The implementation of fixed camera angles and sluggish navigation drew unfavourable comparisons to older survival horror titles, with writers arguing that the stiff movement made traversing the ship's narrow corridors unnecessarily cumbersome. Several critics generally praised the facial animations and character models, while others felt the occasionally stiff expressions fell into the uncanny valley.

=== Accolades ===
At the 2019 The Independent Game Developers' Association Awards, the game won Best Action and Adventure Game and Best Social Game, alongside nominations for Best Audio Design and the Creativity Award. That same year, it was nominated for Best Multiplayer Game at the Golden Joystick Awards. In 2020, the game won Narrative Innovation of the Year at the MCV/Develop Awards, where it also received a nomination for Visual Innovation of the Year. Ayisha Issa's performance as Fliss earned her a nomination for Performer in a Supporting Role at the 16th British Academy Games Awards.

== In other games ==
Switchback VR, a spinoff game of the anthology for PlayStation VR2, includes levels for each of the anthology's first four games, including Man of Medan.
