= The Dark Pictures Anthology: Little Hope =

2020 video game

- Box art featuring Andrew, one of the game's five protagonists
- Developer: Supermassive Games
- Publisher: Bandai Namco Entertainment
- Director: Nik Bowen
- Producer: Ross Manton
- Designers: Kalev Tait; Wayne Garland
- Programmer: Edwin Bell
- Artist: Robert Craig
- Writer: Dario Poloni
- Composer: Jason Graves
- Series: The Dark Pictures Anthology
- Engine: Unreal Engine 4
- Platforms: PlayStation 4; Windows; Xbox One; PlayStation 5; Xbox Series X/S; Nintendo Switch
- Release: PS4, Win, XONE; 30 October 2020; PS5, Xbox Series X/S; 27 September 2022; Switch; 5 October 2023
- Genres: Interactive drama; Survival horror
- Modes: Single-player, multiplayer

The Dark Pictures Anthology: Little Hope is a 2020 interactive drama and survival horror video game developed by Supermassive Games and published by Bandai Namco Entertainment. It is the second game of The Dark Pictures Anthology. The game is set in a fog-shrouded abandoned town in Massachusetts. The narrative follows four college students and their professor who are stranded after a bus crash. As they explore the town, the group is pursued by demons whose appearances are tied to the 17th-century Andover and Salem witch trials. Little Hope retains mechanics used in the previous game in the series, Man of Medan, which include quick time events, two single-player and two multiplayer modes, and collectables that allow the player to see visions of possible future events. The game features a multilinear plot where decisions can alter the trajectory of the story and change the relationships between the five playable protagonists; some choices lead to their permanent deaths.

The developers drew primary inspiration for the premise from the historical Andover and Salem witch trials to explore themes of mass paranoia. They looked to the Silent Hill franchise, Arthur Miller's play The Crucible, and various horror films to establish the game's atmosphere and psychological horror. Supermassive adjusted exploration mechanics from Man of Medan by implementing a user-controllable hybrid camera system and more accessible action sequences. Will Poulter, who plays a college student named Andrew alongside two historical doppelgängers, was marketed as the game's leading actor. Jason Graves composed the soundtrack, using choral chants and antique stringed instruments to reflect the 1692 New England setting.

Little Hope was released for PlayStation 4, Windows, and Xbox One on 30 October 2020, to mixed reviews. Critics commended the game's audio design, along with the detailed environments and character models. Criticism was directed at the superficial choice mechanics and the plot twist ending. The third game in the series, House of Ashes, was revealed in a teaser trailer at the end of Little Hope and released on 22 October 2021. Versions of Little Hope for PlayStation 5 and Xbox Series X/S were released in September 2022, followed by a Nintendo Switch version in October 2023.

== Gameplay ==
One of the protagonists, Angela, escapes from a demon in pursuit of her by climbing on top of a ledge. To successfully do this, the player must complete a quick time event—in this case, pressing a button a specific number of times before the timer runs out.

The Dark Pictures Anthology: Little Hope is an interactive drama and survival horror game played from a third-person perspective. The player controls five protagonists who become trapped within an abandoned town called Little Hope. The game shifts between these characters at pre-set intervals. While exploring the linear environments, the player can examine highlighted objects to discover collectable items, which include aged notes and fallen portraits. The player can also find collectable pictures that unlock premonitions that offer glimpses of possible future events that hint at potential dangers or narrative outcomes. Supermassive Games adjusted the exploration mechanics from the previous instalment, Man of Medan (2019), by replacing the fixed camera angles with a user-controllable camera in specific sections and increasing the characters' default walking speed.

The narrative uses a multilinear choice system presented through an on-screen compass interface. The player selects between dialogue options, and remaining silent is treated as a valid narrative input. These decisions shape the story's direction and unlock character traits. The choices dictate the overarching plot, which results in a narrative with branching paths where any of the five characters can survive or permanently die. During action sequences, the game prompts the player to complete quick time events (QTEs). These involve tasks including dodging attacks and tapping buttons in rhythm to a character's heartbeat to remain hidden. Failing these prompts can result in severe consequences, including a character's death. On-screen notifications warn the player before a QTE begins and indicate the required action to make these sequences more accessible. The game's overarching structure is framed by the Curator, an authorial persona who appears during chapter breaks to observe the player's progress. While his primary role is to provide meta-commentary on the story, he can offer cryptic guidance regarding character survival.

The primary single-player campaign is the Theatrical Cut. An alternative single-player mode, the Curator's Cut, offers a different perspective on the narrative by allowing the player to control other characters in alternate scenes. Little Hope also features two multiplayer modes: Shared Story is a two-player online cooperative mode where both individuals experience the narrative simultaneously. In the Movie Night mode, up to five local players select one of the characters to play as and pass the controller to the next person when prompted by the story.

== Synopsis ==
=== Setting and prologue ===
Little Hope is set in a fictionalised version of the ghost town in Massachusetts, which is isolated by a dense fog. The narrative explores multiple timelines, jumping between the present day and the town's colonial witch trials era. The prologue takes place in 1972 and follows the Clarke family: parents Anne and James, and their four adopted children, Anthony, Tanya, Dennis, and Megan. Megan starts a house fire that kills her parents and siblings, with only Anthony surviving. Following the prologue, the Curator introduces himself to the player and outlines the story's premise.

=== Characters ===
The five protagonists are four college students—Andrew (Will Poulter), Taylor (Caitlyn Sponheimer), Daniel (Kyle Bailey), and Angela (Ellen David), a mature student in her forties, along with their professor, John (Alex Ivanovici), a recovering alcoholic.

Little Hope centres on a group that generally struggles to cooperate, with their interactions shaped by the player's choices. Interpersonal dynamics include a romantic relationship between Taylor and Daniel, and an established history between Andrew and Angela. Angela is portrayed as highly critical, frequently making cutting remarks and putting her companions down. The protagonists' identities are integral to the plot, as the narrative explores their connections to doppelgängers from the town's history across the different timelines.

=== Main plot ===
In the present day, a bus driver transporting the protagonists is forced to take a detour through Little Hope, where the bus crashes. The driver vanishes, and the group ventures into the fog-shrouded town to seek help. They encounter Vince, a local resident with ties to the 1972 fire, who informs them that the town is abandoned and without power.

As they navigate, the group is repeatedly pulled into the 17th century by a ghostly apparition of a young girl named Mary, the historical doppelgänger of Anthony's deceased sister, Megan. During these visions, the protagonists witness Reverend Carver manipulating Mary into falsely accusing the townspeople, who are doppelgängers of the present-day group, of witchcraft. As the historical counterparts are executed, demonic manifestations of their deaths emerge in the present to hunt the modern group.

The surviving characters eventually reach the ruined Clarke family household, where they witness a final vision of Carver betraying Mary. Through his historical doppelgänger, Andrew can influence the past and choose either to expose Carver's deception, destroy Mary's doll, or allow Mary to be executed. Following this confrontation, the narrative reveals that the bus driver is actually an adult Anthony Clarke. The modern-day students, the professor, and the demonic creatures were all hallucinations manifested from Anthony's survivor guilt; he had been wandering the town entirely alone following the crash. The story's conclusion is determined by Anthony's prior interactions with Vince, whether he acquired a firearm, and how he handled Mary's trial. Depending on these choices, Anthony will either be arrested, commit suicide, remain burdened by his guilt, or finally accept that the fire was an accident and find peace.

== Development ==
Little Hope is the second instalment in The Dark Pictures Anthology, which was originally planned as an eight-game series. (Note: Supermassive's Dan McDonald stated in April 2026 that the original roadmap had shifted, and the studio was no longer strictly adhering to an eight-game limit.) Supermassive incorporated player feedback from Man of Medan to refine several gameplay systems. The team lowered the difficulty of QTEs and extended the player's reaction windows to make action sequences more accessible. They added visual warnings before QTEs to communicate that failing an action sequence was usually the result of earlier narrative decisions rather than poor reflexes. The on-screen choice interface was also redesigned to be deliberately jarring, prompting players to pause and consider their decisions carefully rather than acting purely on emotion. Due to the COVID-19 pandemic, the studio transitioned to remote work in June 2020.

=== Story and design ===
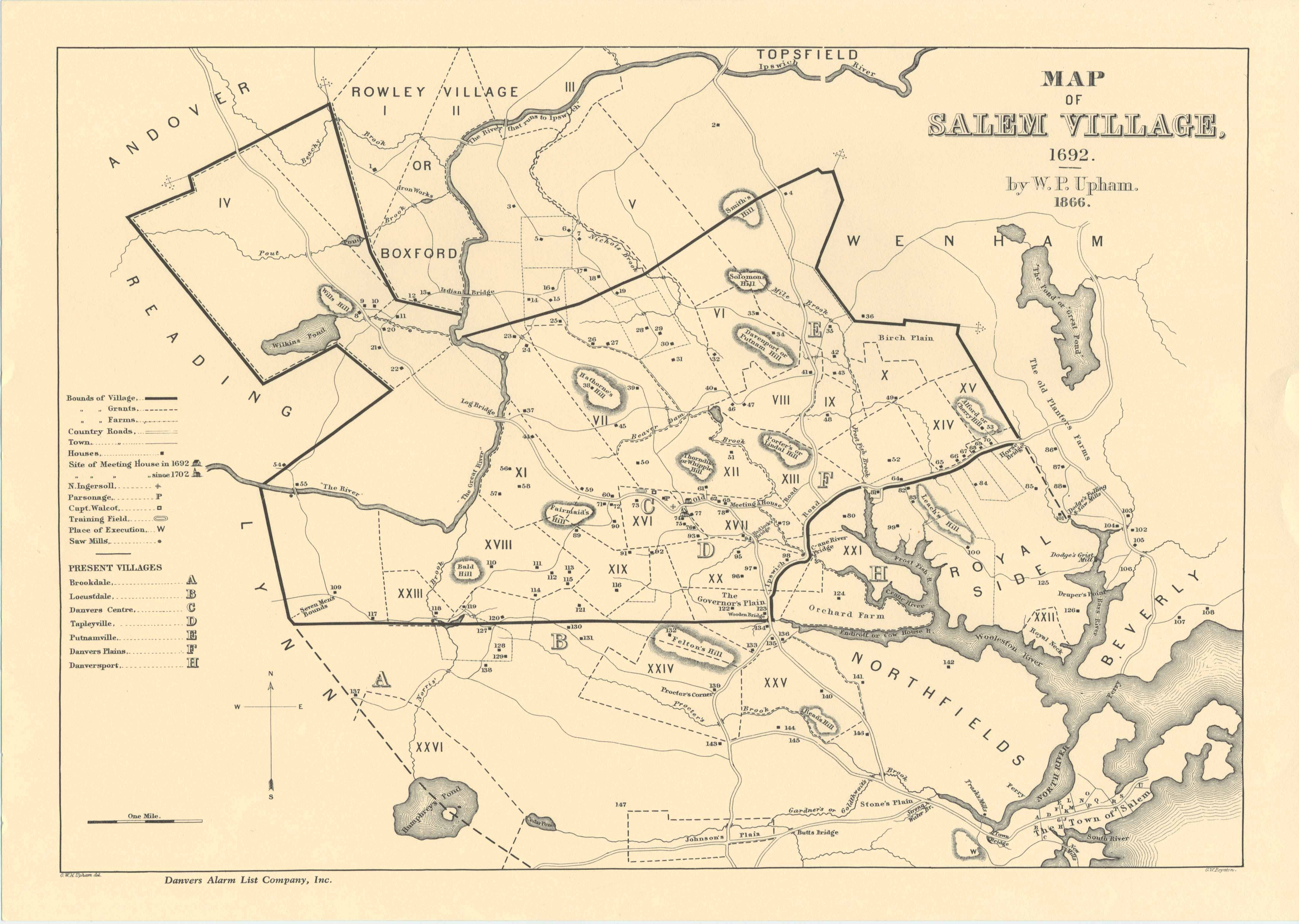
A map of 1692 Salem Village. The developers drew upon the witch trials of the era to explore themes of paranoia within the game's 17th-century setting.

Supermassive designed Little Hope as a standalone story within a shared universe, connected to other anthology instalments by the presence of the Curator and hidden Easter eggs. In response to player feedback regarding the pacing of Man of Medan, the team designed the opening sequence of Little Hope to establish the core threat faster. They shifted away from the modern-day setting of Man of Medan in favour of a narrative intertwining the present day with the 17th-century Andover and Salem witch trials. Executive producer Pete Samuels explained that the studio chose witchcraft as the central theme to explore the historical roots of paranoia and how communities turn on one another. The team drew on the real-world Andover witch trials, as the town historically recorded more accusations than Salem. During their research, the developers discovered a recreation of a 1692 map featuring a small tract of land labelled "Little Hope Meadow", which directly inspired the name of the game's setting. Supermassive also enlisted a costume designer from the film industry to research period-accurate clothing for the 1692 timeline. The Silent Hill franchise, particularly its use of volumetric fog, and Arthur Miller's play, The Crucible, inspired the game's narrative and atmosphere. The team also drew upon horror films including The Witch (2015), The Blair Witch Project (1999), Hellraiser (1987), It Follows (2014), The Omen (1976), and Season of the Witch (1973).

Supermassive initially conceptualised the threat around a group being hunted by a single supernatural force and drew inspiration from It Follows and the "Mr. X" mechanic in Resident Evil 2. As the witchcraft theme solidified, this evolved into demons that physically manifested the execution methods of the 17th-century doppelgängers. The art team referenced autopsies to accurately depict the physical trauma of hangings and prolonged water exposure. The developers used backlighting and the town's fog to obscure the full forms of the demons and relied on silhouettes to maximise player tension. They designed the creatures to represent the psychological trauma that can result from witnessing traumatic events. Supermassive used custom tools within Unreal Engine 4 to synchronise the story for both players without delays to accommodate the branching narrative during the Shared Story mode. The team implemented a hybrid camera system and transitioned between the fixed cinematic angles of Man of Medan and a player-controlled 360-degree camera to enhance environments.

=== Casting ===
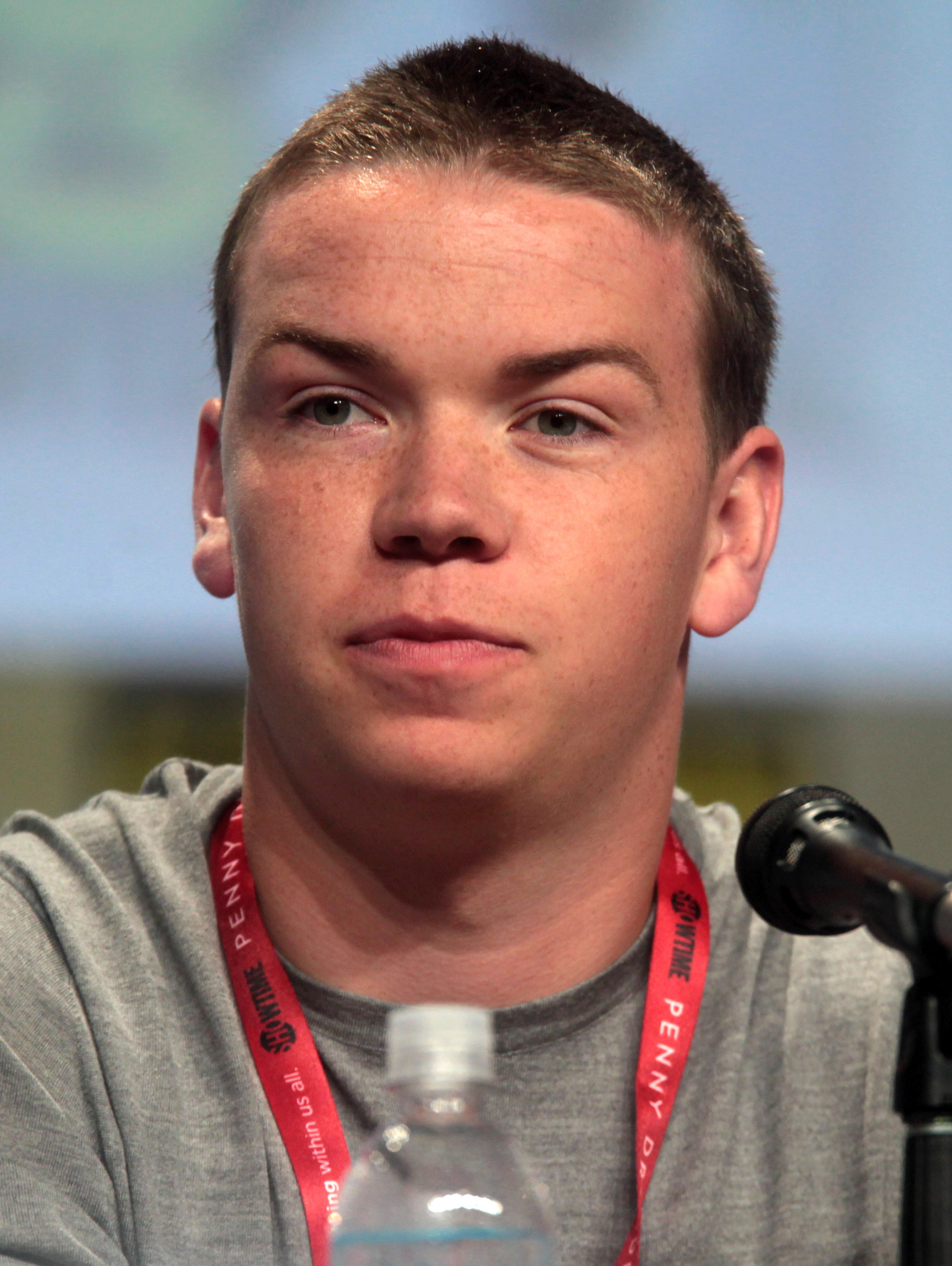
Will Poulter (pictured in 2014), who plays Andrew, Anthony, and Abraham, was marketed as the game's leading actor.

Supermassive Games marketed Will Poulter as the game's leading actor. He provided both the voice and motion capture performances for three characters across the narrative's multiple timelines: present-day college student Andrew, Anthony, and 17th-century resident Abraham. Because the narrative spans three time periods, the studio required the cast to portray multiple iterations of their characters. Poulter used distinct mannerisms and accents for each era to differentiate his roles, which included a Northern English accent for the 17th-century setting. The development team employed dialect coach Julia Leonard to assist him in navigating the shifts. Alex Ivanovici altered his performance to portray the middle-aged professor John by adopting a heavier and less mobile running style to reflect the character's older age and larger build.

As Little Hope marked his first fully motion captured performance, Poulter stated that the pacing of video game development was significantly faster than his previous television and film work. He drew upon his experience acting in the interactive film Black Mirror: Bandersnatch (2018) to navigate the complexities of performing within a branching narrative. While Bandersnatch was filmed entirely out of continuity, Supermassive allowed the cast to shoot the branching scenarios in mostly chronological sequence. The studio grouped traumatic action sequences together and shot them out of order; the cast found this emotionally exhausting, as they had to snap into high-energy states of terror without the benefit of a build-up. Game director Nik Bowen instructed the cast to avoid overly theatrical performances and to focus on authenticity to heighten the psychological horror. Performing scenes where temporal doppelgängers directly interacted with one another proved challenging; Poulter described the motion capture process for these sequences as a "brain scramble".

Actors described the experience of performing in a blank motion capture volume as strange. They relied on interacting with isolated props and their imagination to convey the game's horror, though some found the uninhibited environment freeing. Supermassive hired actors to physically portray the demons to ensure the monster movements appeared realistically distressed. The team applied practical constraints to the performers during filming, which included tying physical spikes to them as they limped across the volume. The only exception was the "crushed demon", which had to be entirely hand-animated because the team could not use motion capture footage for it.

=== Music and sound design ===
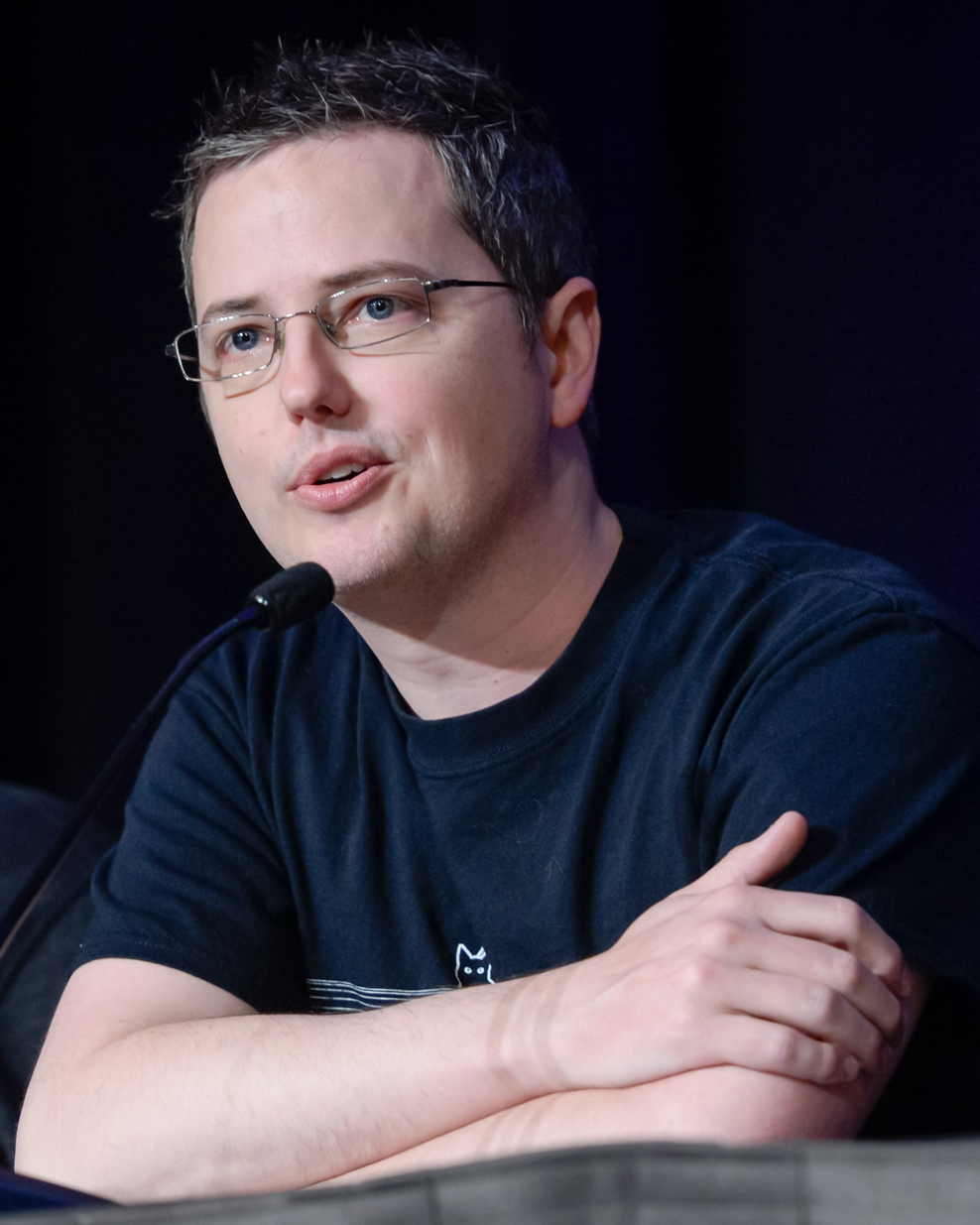
Jason Graves (pictured in 2016) reprises his role as composer for The Dark Pictures Anthology.

Jason Graves, who previously composed the score for Man of Medan, returned to compose the soundtrack for Little Hope. He avoided the orchestral and synthesiser sounds of the previous game, and instead focused on capturing the atmosphere of 1692 New England. Graves recorded the score using antique stringed instruments to reflect the historical setting of the witch trials. These included a bowed psaltery, hurdy-gurdy, hammered dulcimer, and a solo cello. He kept the instruments out of tune and used his first recorded takes without digital editing. He also recruited his youngest daughter to record the game's main theme, nursery rhymes, and mysterious whispering to accompany choral chants. Graves composed a six-note motif played on an aged piano, which audio director Barney Pratt stated that it provided subtle clues regarding the character's overarching narrative journey.

Pratt revealed the audio team's primary focus was creating a strong presence for the game's demons. Because each demon visually represents the execution method of a 17th-century character, their audio profiles were built to reflect that trauma; the team mixed distant chains and screams with close-up sounds of cracking skin, vomit, and strained breathing. The team designed these close-up sound effects to feel uncomfortably close to the player. They also designed the overall soundscape to reflect the characters' psychological trauma and created separate audio structures for footsteps and clothing scuffs alongside a dynamic breathing system that reacted in real-time to the protagonists' exhaustion and stress levels.

=== Release ===
Supermassive revealed Little Hope in August 2019 via a post-credits teaser trailer included within Man of Medan. Bandai Namco Entertainment officially announced the game in February 2020. They initially targeting a middle of 2020 launch, but the game was delayed due to the COVID-19 pandemic. Little Hope was released for PlayStation 4, Windows, and Xbox One on 30 October 2020. Supermassive later launched native versions for PlayStation 5 and Xbox Series X/S on 27 September 2022, which introduced enhanced visuals alongside new accessibility and difficulty settings. A port for the Nintendo Switch was released on 5 October 2023. A post-credits teaser trailer at the end of the game revealed the next instalment in the anthology, House of Ashes, which was released on 22 October 2021. Switchback VR, a spinoff game of the anthology for PlayStation VR2, includes levels for each of the anthology's first four games, including Little Hope.

== Reception ==
Little Hope debuted as the ninth best-selling physical retail game in the UK during its first week. It was also the fourth best-selling digital game in the UK for the week ending 31 October 2020, though its overall launch week sales were lower than those of Man of Medan. At the 2021 TIGA Awards, Little Hope won the awards for "Game of the Year" and "Best Social Game", and received a nomination for "Best Audio in a Game Cinematic".

=== Critical response ===
Reception

Aggregate scores
Aggregator	Score
Metacritic	PC: 73/100; PS4: 71/100; XONE: 65/100
OpenCritic	50% recommend

Review scores
Publication	Score
Destructoid	8/10
Game Informer	7.5/10
GameRevolution	5/10
GameSpot	6/10
GamesRadar+	4/5
Hardcore Gamer	3.5/5
IGN	5/10
PC Gamer (US)	74/100
Push Square	7/10
Shacknews	7/10

Little Hope received "mixed or average" reviews on the review aggregator website Metacritic, while 50% of critics recommended the game according to OpenCritic. Critics praised the detailed character models and atmospheric environments, alongside Poulter's performance across the multiple timelines. Reviewers commended the soundscape and Graves's musical score for heightening the tension and reinforcing the supernatural dread of the 17th-century setting. Several publications considered the game a significant improvement over Man of Medan; Mark Delaney of GamesRadar+ and Push Square's Liam Croft characterised it as the strongest release from Supermassive since Until Dawn (2015).

The game's investigative elements drew a mixed response. While PC Gamer's Fraser Brown appreciated the freed-up camera system for giving players more control to explore derelict buildings, Sam Chandler of Shacknews criticised the sluggish character movement and cumbersome camera angles for making environmental searches tedious. Reviewers also faulted the overall gameplay for failing to meaningfully evolve the anthology's formula.

The implementation of action sequences and QTEs also divided critics. Kimberley Wallace of Game Informer praised the decision to include on-screen notifications warning players of upcoming button prompts as a welcome change from the previous instalment, while IGN's Lucy O'Brien wrote that the warnings and extended reaction windows lowered the difficulty. Reviewers argued that this lack of challenge during action set-pieces diminished the sense of peril and undermined the overarching horror.

Critics expressed polarised opinions regarding the narrative pacing and branching choice system. Wallace highlighted the storytelling and lore-rich world, while Edwin Evans-Thirlwell of Eurogamer found that the game tethered character traits and relationships more confidently to story outcomes than in the previous game. O'Brien and GameSpot's Andrew King considered the choice-and-consequence mechanics largely superficial, as interpersonal dynamics frequently felt divorced from the player's dialogue choices. Wallace also found the thriller aspects underwhelming and concluded that the reliance on predictable horror tropes and basic jump scares detracted from the overarching psychological dread.

The narrative's conclusion was a significant point of contention among critics. Evans-Thirlwell and King argued that the ending was a disappointment that failed to bring the game's various timelines together in a satisfying way. The revelation that the demonic creatures and historical doppelgängers were manifestations of Anthony's survivor guilt and PTSD was specifically criticised for undermining the game's interactive elements. The "it was all in his head" trope was polarising and alienated portions of the player base, an issue documented by Michael Leri of Game Revolution and Brandon Trush of Bloody Disgusting. Despite this frustration regarding the interactive mechanics, several publications acknowledged the ending as a poignant and effective thematic exploration of trauma and grief.
