= The Dark Pictures =

Video game series

- Genres: Interactive drama; Survival horror
- Developer: Supermassive Games
- Publishers: Bandai Namco Entertainment (Note: Bandai Namco Entertainment published the first four games of the series.); Supermassive Games
- Creator: Pete Samuels
- Artists: Robert Craig (MoM, LH, HoA); David Hirst (HoA, TDiM)
- Writers: Larry Fessenden (MoM); Graham Reznick (MoM); Andrew Ewington (LH, HoA, TDiM); Dario Poloni (LH); Khurrum Rahman (HoA); Paul Martin (TDiM); Alex Farnham (TDiM); Seth M. Sherwood (TDiM)
- Composer: Jason Graves
- Platforms: Nintendo Switch, PlayStation 4, PlayStation 5, Windows, Xbox One, Xbox Series X/S
- First release: Man of Medan; 30 August 2019
- Latest release: Directive 8020; 12 May 2026

The Dark Pictures (Note: Following the release of The Devil in Me, Supermassive dropped the "Anthology" branding from the series title, opting instead for the tagline "A Dark Pictures Game" starting with Directive 8020 to emphasise that the games are standalone experiences.) is an anthology series of interactive drama and survival horror video games developed and published by Supermassive Games (with the first four games published by Bandai Namco Entertainment). Each game is inspired by a different horror genre and features five main characters whose survival depends on the choices made by the player. While each character only appears in one game, face models are often reused across the series, except those of the leading actors. The games use a third-person perspective and allow the player to choose from various dialogue options and courses of action.

The series began with Man of Medan (2019), which was followed by Little Hope (2020), House of Ashes (2021), and The Devil in Me (2022). The most recent game, Directive 8020, released on 12 May 2026. While the anthology was initially planned to consist of eight games broken down into seasons, Supermassive later shifted its roadmap, moving away from the overarching season concept and strict game limit to focus on standalone experiences. A spin-off video game, Switchback VR, was released for the PlayStation VR2 on 16 March 2023.

== Games ==
Release timeline Main instalments in bold text
| 2019 | **Man of Medan** |
| 2020 | **Little Hope** |
| 2021 | **House of Ashes** |
| 2022 | **The Devil in Me** |
| 2023 | Switchback VR |
2024
2025
| 2026 | **Directive 8020** |

The series was initially planned to consist of eight games across two seasons, with a new instalment releasing every six months. However, executive producer Dan McDonald stated in April 2026 that the original roadmap had shifted, resulting in the studio no longer strictly adhering to an eight game limit. Supermassive also dropped the "season" branding leading up to the release of Directive 8020, which was originally billed as the second season premiere, in order to focus on the game as a standalone title. By de-emphasising the episodic and overarching branding, the studio aimed to highlight that players do not need to play previous entries to understand the newer games.

=== Main series ===
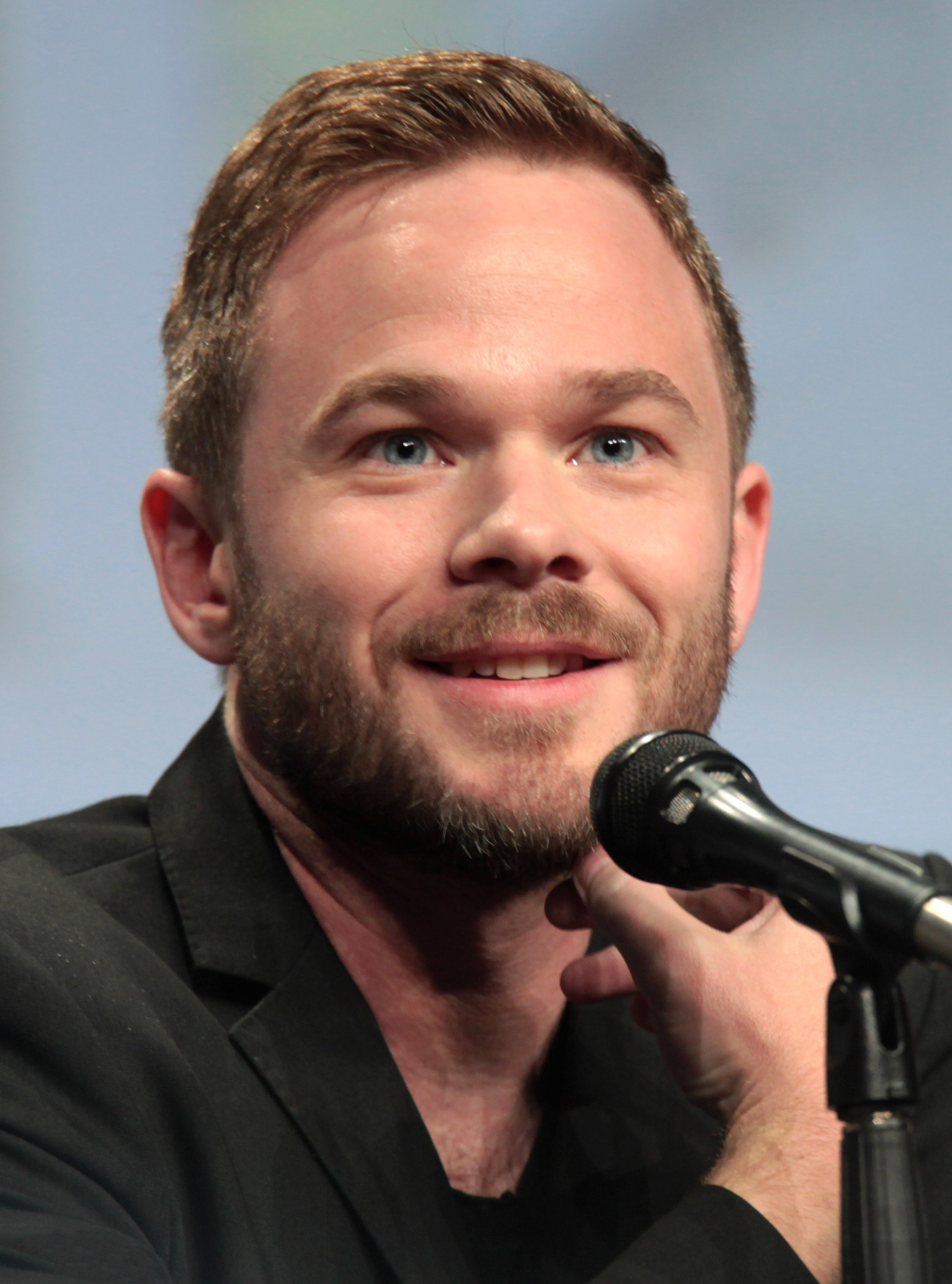
Shawn Ashmore

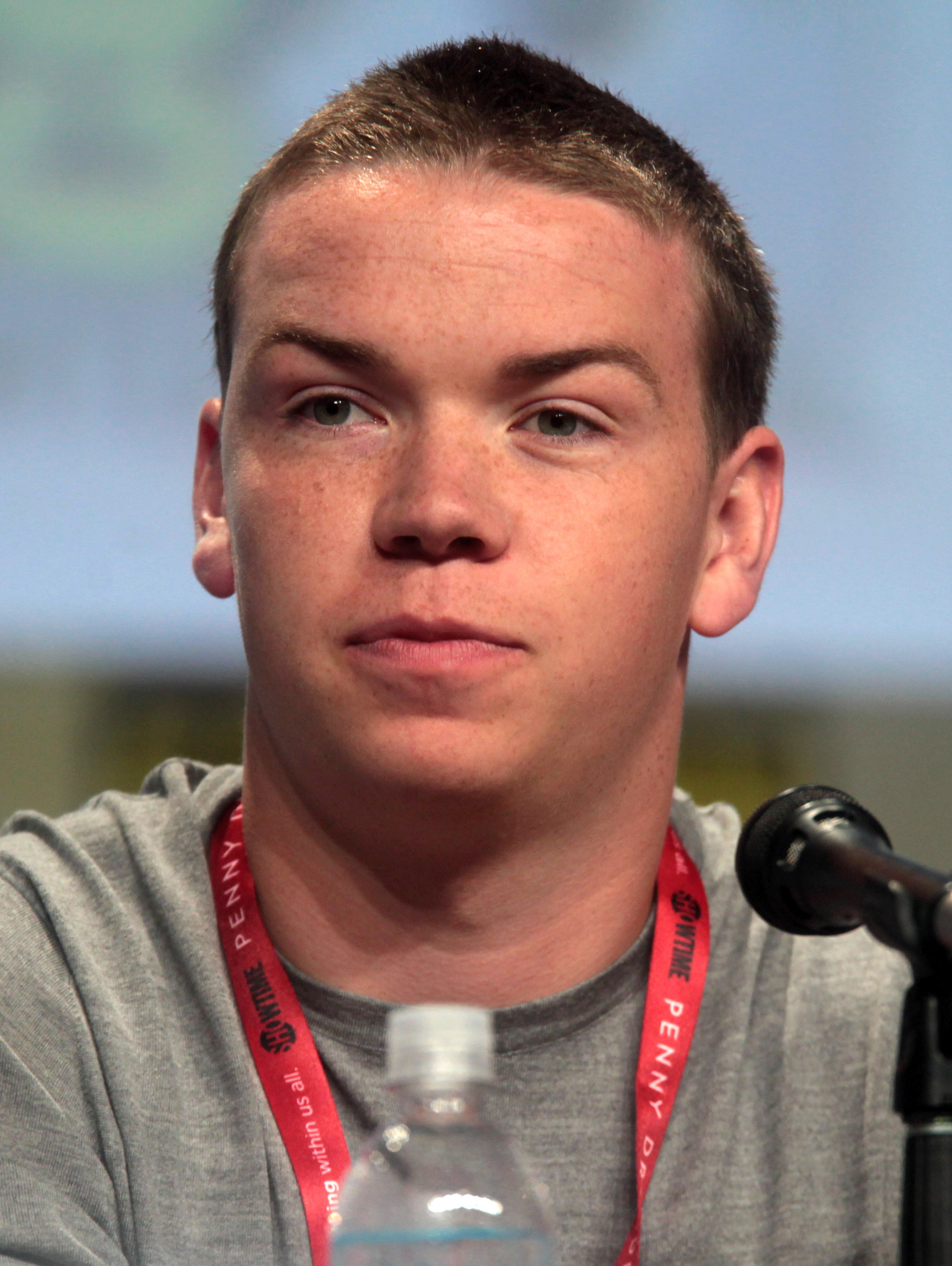
Will Poulter

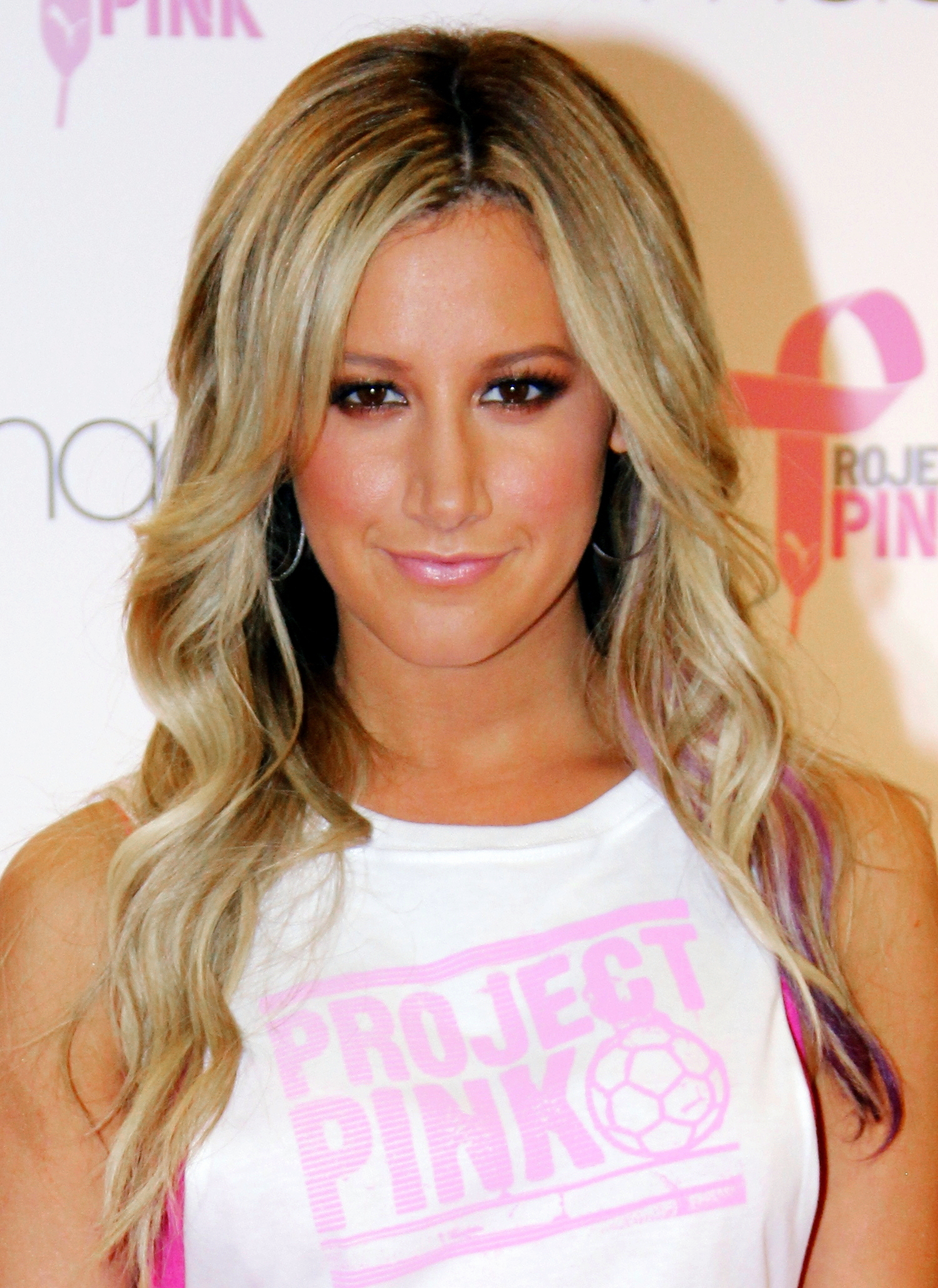
Ashley Tisdale

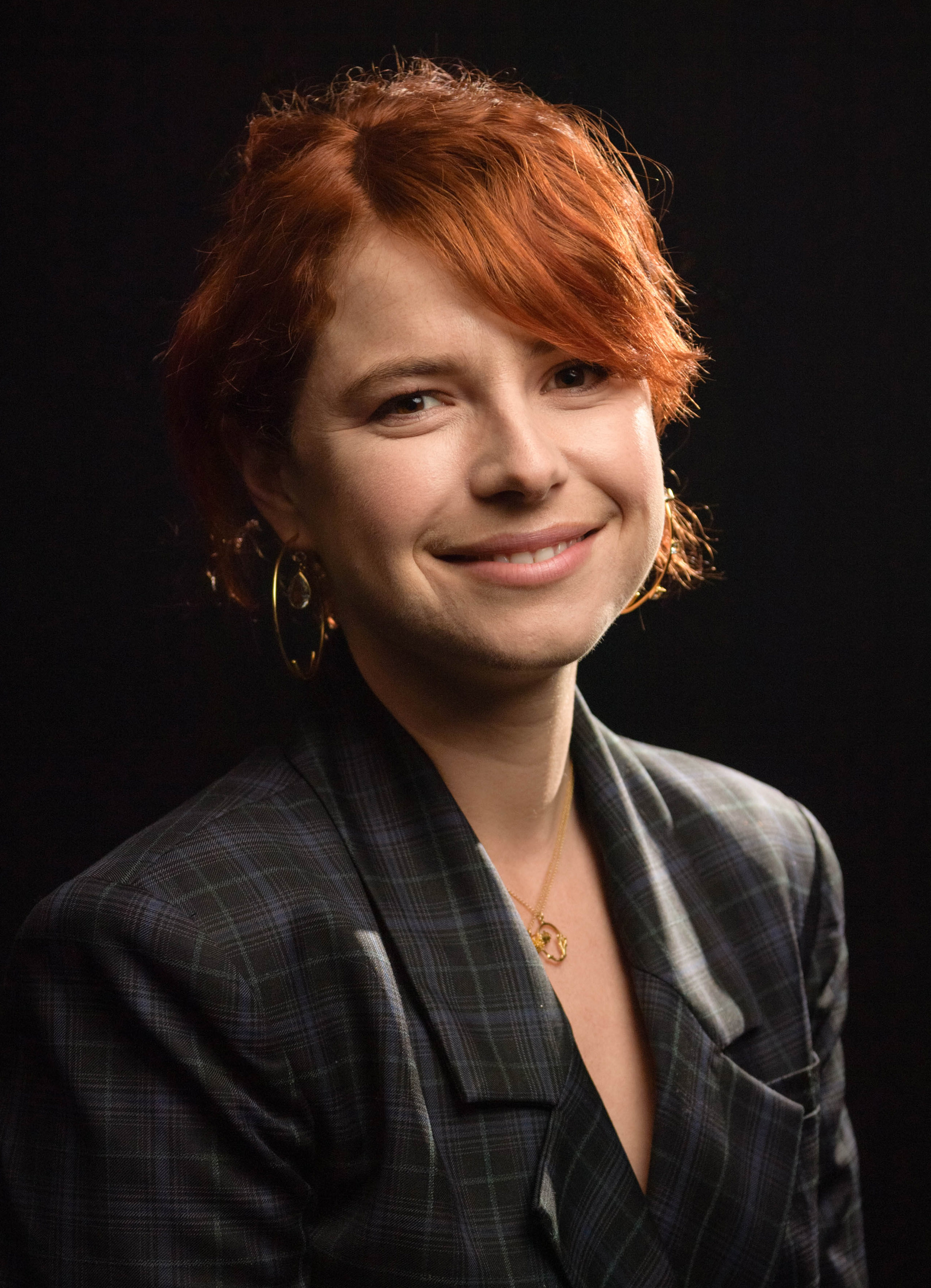
Jessie Buckley

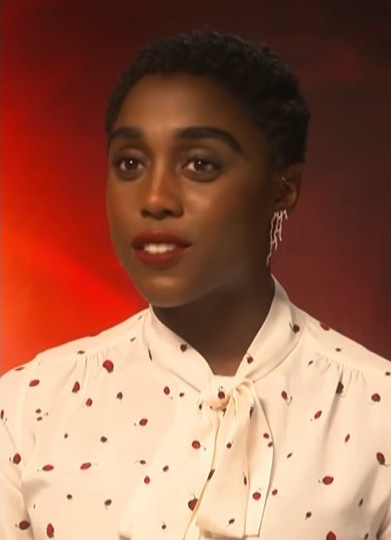
Lashana Lynch

Ashmore (Man of Medan), Poulter (Little Hope), Tisdale (House of Ashes), Buckley (The Devil in Me), and Lynch (Directive 8020) are the leading actors for each game, with each of their characters appearing on the cover art and their names listed first in the credits of their respective games.

Man of Medan was revealed on 21 August 2018 and released worldwide for PlayStation 4, Windows, and Xbox One on 30 August 2019. PlayStation 5 and Xbox Series X/S versions with enhanced visuals were released as a free upgrade on 27 September 2022, alongside an update for all platforms which included a new chapter, improved U.I., new difficulty and QTE settings, and other tweaks and features. A Nintendo Switch version was released on 4 May 2023. The game is inspired by the myth of the Ourang Medan, a suspected ghost ship from the 1940s, that wrecked after the crew all died under suspicious circumstances. Additional inspirations include the horror films Ghost Ship (2002), Triangle (2009), Insidious (2010), and The Shining (1980).

During World War II, a storm causes a biochemical weapon onboard the American freighter SS Ourang Medan, known as Manchurian Gold, to leak from its crates. The resulting gas causes the crew to see ghostly figures, causing all of the crew to die either from heart attacks or accidentally being attacked by their fellow crewmates. In the present day, Alex and his girlfriend Julia, as well as their respective brothers, Brad and Conrad, and their dive boat captain, Fliss are boarded by pirates. They eventually find and board the Ourang Medan, thinking that the Manchurian Gold is actually gold, although who boards the ghost ship and when depends on player choices. For the rest of the story, choices by the player determines who lives and dies, and if anyone is able to escape the ship after being exposed to the Manchurian Gold.

Little Hope was revealed as a post-credits trailer at the end of Man of Medan and released worldwide for PlayStation 4, Windows, and Xbox One on 30 October 2020. A free upgrade for PlayStation 5 and Xbox Series X/S was released on 27 September 2022. The upgrade included enhanced visuals, improved U.I., new difficulty and QTE settings, amongst other tweaks and features. The game is inspired by the Salem witch trials of 1692, but also takes inspiration from a variety of films and games. Film inspirations include The Blair Witch Project (1999) and The Omen (1976), while the Silent Hill franchise is a key video game inspiration.

House of Ashes was first revealed in a post-credits teaser trailer at the end of Little Hope and released worldwide for PlayStation 4, PlayStation 5, Windows, Xbox One, and Xbox Series X/S on 22 October 2021. The game is inspired by the films Aliens (1986), Predator (1987), and The Descent (2005); the book At the Mountains of Madness; and the myth of the Curse of Akkad.

The Devil in Me was revealed in a post-credits teaser trailer at the end of House of Ashes and released worldwide for PlayStation 4, PlayStation 5, Windows, Xbox One, and Xbox Series X/S on 18 November 2022 as the season one finale of the anthology before the season concept was dropped. The game is inspired by H. H. Holmes, America's first serial killer, and his "Murder Castle", as well as various slasher films including Psycho (1960), The Shining (1980), the Saw franchise, the Halloween franchise, and the Friday the 13th franchise.

Directive 8020 was revealed in a post-credits teaser trailer at the end of The Devil in Me. It will be the season two premiere of the anthology. As of mid-October 2022, Directive 8020 was entering production with a lot of data already shot. On 31 December 2023, a short video teaser for the game was posted to celebrate New Year's Eve. The game was released on 12 May 2026 for PlayStation 5, Windows, and Xbox Series X/S. Creative director Will Doyle described Directive 8020 as "The Thing in deep space". Doyle stated that the game also takes inspiration from other sci-fi horror films including Solaris (1972), Alien (1979), Event Horizon (1997), Pandorum (2009), Prometheus (2012), Life (2017), and Sputnik (2020). Other influences include H. P. Lovecraft's cosmic horrors.

==== Future games ====
In February 2022, Supermassive Games filed trademarks for six potential future entries. Five featured the standard The Dark Pictures branding, subtitled The Craven Man, Directive 8020, Intercession, Winterfold, and Switchback. The sixth potential title, subtitled O Death, is instead branded The Dark Pictures Presents. In November, Studio Director Dan McDonald said "game number 6 is in its early design phase. Game number 7, you know, we just started that as of yesterday [October 17], in fact. But we've known for a long time what that's going to be, we just started kicking off with the game director working on it." He also said "we're having conversations about what's beyond [Game #8]", while adding that ideas for additional games "have already been kicking around for a while". While discussing Directive 8020, Will Doyle said the advancements in the game's set of tools would carry over into the future games. Although the first four games of the anthology released yearly, Doyle added "we don't want to be tied down to a game every six months or one every year or anything like that" while referring to how Directive 8020 was a big game and the team wanted to treat it that way.

=== Spin-off ===
Switchback VR was announced on 2 November 2022 and was referred to as a PlayStation VR2 launch window title. However, in January 2023 Supermassive Games announced that the game would be slightly delayed leading to it being released on 16 March 2023 on PlayStation VR2. It is a spiritual successor to Until Dawn: Rush of Blood and contains levels inspired by the first four games of the anthology.

== Cast and characters ==
| Character | Main series | | | | | Spin-off |
| Character | Man of Medan (2019) | Little Hope (2020) | House of Ashes (2021) | The Devil in Me (2022) | Directive 8020 (2026) | Switchback VR (2023) |
|---|---|---|---|---|---|---|
| The Curator | Pip Torrens | Pip Torrens | Pip Torrens | Pip Torrens | Pip Torrens | Non-speaking cameo |
| Charlie Anderson | Sean Colby | | | | | |
| Conrad | Shawn Ashmore | | | | | |
| Danny | Russell Yuen | | | | | |
| Fliss DuBois | Ayisha Issa | | | | | |
| Julia | Arielle Palik | | | | | |
| Junior | Chimwemwe Miller | | | | | |
| Olson | Kwasi Songui | | | | | |
| Joe Roberts | Adrian Burhop | | | | | |
| Alex Smith | Kareem Alleyne | | | | | |
| Brad Smith | Chris Sandiford | | | | | |
| Andrew / Anthony Clarke / Abraham Alastor | | Will Poulter | | | | |
| Angela / Anne Clarke | | Ellen David | | | | |
| Vince Barnes | | Kevin Hanchard | | | | |
| Leonard Carson | | George Weightman | | | | |
| Simon Carver | | David Smith | | | | |
| Megan Clarke | | Ella Rose Coderre | | | | |
| Daniel / Dennis Clarke | | Kyle Bailey | | | | |
| Amy Lambert | | Louise Atkins | | | | |
| Joseph Lambert | | Martin Walsh | | | | |
| John / James Clarke | | Alex Ivanovici | | | | |
| David Milton | | Scott Haining | | | | |
| Mary Milton | | Holly Smith | | | | |
| Tabitha Milton | | Rebecca Brierley | | | | |
| Taylor / Tanya Clarke | | Caitlyn Sponheimer | | | | |
| Isaac Worel | | Freddie Bolt | | | | |
| Thomas Wyman | | Adam Jowett | | | | |
| Balathu | | | Zaydun Khalaf | | | |
| Dar Basri | | | Nabeel El Khafif | | | |
| Brooks | | | Brittany Drisdelle | | | |
| Joey Gomez | | | Sammy Azero | | | |
| Nick Kay | | | Moe Jeudy-Lamour | | | |
| Eric King | | | Alex Gravenstein | | | |
| Rachel King | | | Ashley Tisdale | | | |
| Jason Kolchek | | | Paul Zinno | | | |
| Kurum | | | Waleed Hammad | | | |
| Naram-Sin | | | Sami Karim | | | |
| Nathan Merwin | | | Alex Mallari Jr. | | | |
| Miller | | | Marcel Jeannin | | | |
| Salim Othman | | | Nick E. Tarabay | | | |
| Clarice Stokes | | | Clare McConnell | | | |
| H. H. Holmes | | | | John Dagleish | | |
| Erin Keenan | | | | Nikki Patel | | |
| Charlie Lonnit | | | | Paul Kaye | | |
| Joseph Morello | | | | Abdul Salis | | |
| Mark Nestor | | | | Fehinti Balogun | | |
| Jamie Tiergan | | | | Gloria Obianyo | | |
| Jeff Whitman | | | | Edward Bluemel | | |
| Marie Whitman | | | | Kitty Archer | | |
| Kate Wilder | | | | Jessie Buckley | | |
| Zoe Anders | | | | | Kathryn Wilder | |
| Tomas Carter | | | | | Frank Blake | |
| Josef Cernan | | | | | Philip Arditti | |
| Samantha Cooper | | | | | Anna Leong Brophy | |
| Laura Eisele | | | | | Lotte Verbeek | |
| Noah Mitchell | | | | | Colin Bates | |
| Pari Simms | | | | | Anneika Rose | |
| Nolan Stafford | | | | | Danny Sapani | |
| LaMarcus Williams | | | | | Kobna Holdbrook-Smith | |
| Brianna Young | | | | | Lashana Lynch | |
| Anthony | | | | | | Milton L. |
| Belial / Laila | | | | | | Amelia Tyler |
| Charlotte | | | | | | Clare Foster |
| Claudia | | | | | | Angeline F. |
| Fireman | | | | | | Ed Ashe |
| Robert | | | | | | John Moraitis |
| Scarlett | | | | | | Anne Wittman |

== Common elements ==
The series is themed around popular horror fiction, with each game acting as a tribute to a different subgenre or trope. Players make decisions on behalf of individual characters before watching their consequences play out. As discussed in Until Dawn, these games rely heavily on the butterfly effect, and every decision the player makes can affect the ending the player can achieve. The games have support for co-operative multiplayer play, where each player controls one character.

Each game is a standalone narrative linked to the wider series through The Curator (Pip Torrens (voice), Tony Pankhurst (model)), a mysterious narrator who addresses the player directly to introduce gameplay mechanics and discuss key choices. The games are further bridged by the Curator's personal haunt, a large library called the Repository, where he presents each game's story as an embedded narrative on the shelves of his study. The Curator is further characterized as an external, supernatural force, who describes himself as somehow barred from interfering directly but nonetheless appears in the background of certain character deaths. There are hints throughout the series that point to him possibly being a personification of Death. The Curator is a continuation of Supermassive Games' tradition of having "narrators" who appear in brief intermissions to give hints or cryptic clues, starting with Dr Hill the psychiatrist in Until Dawn and also later continuing with Eliza the fortune teller in The Quarry.

"O Death", an Appalachian folk song originally featured in Until Dawn, returns as the theme song of the anthology. A doom metal recording by the band Khemmis accompanies each of the Curator's entrances as both a series intro and a personal motif, alongside a unique recording featured over the end credits of each title.

=== Art design ===
The skull logo is used in the official logo of the anthology, as well as variations of it on the cover art of all the main series games.

The series' main logo and all the games contain a skull prominently featured in their cover art. For the games, the skull contains teases for what is in the game, while also featuring the leading actor's character. Man of Medan's skull features a compass dial around the upper edge. Inside the skull features Conrad with the Ourang Medan in a greenish colorway next to him. Behind the skull is a map. Little Hope features Andrew in the foreground, with Mary near a fire and a hanging stick figure. Behind the skull is a burned map. House of Ashes features a skull with fangs as well as Rachel and a statue of Pazuzu. Behind the skull is a sandstone wall with various images including part of a map. The Devil in Me's skull has a piece of metal attached to the mouth with blood. Kate is featured, along with Du'Met and the World's Fair Hotel replica. A map of the area is featured in the background.

== Development ==
After favourable reception of their 2015 title Until Dawn, developer Supermassive Games realized that there was a market for interactive drama horror games, and wanted to expand the concept to a larger audience. By 2018, Konami began soliciting pitches for future Silent Hill titles, including for an episodic series. Supermassive Games was among those developers to pitch such title, but Konami ultimately turned them down in favor of collaborating with different developers. Their Silent Hill proposal was repurposed as the framework for the anthology series. Thus, The Dark Pictures Anthology series was created, with Man of Medan being the first of eight planned instalments in the series. Supermassive Games stated that they plan on releasing the subsequent seven games every six months in the anthology, with each game based on a horror trope that will feature a unique story with no correlation to the other entries in the series. In 2020, publisher Bandai Namco Entertainment described it as difficult to market as a series, as it was called an "anthology" while only having one entry; they considered it a long-term investment, that they thought would make more sense to players and would get a larger audience as more games become available.

=== Music ===
The music for the series is composed by Jason Graves, while the opening theme is a rendition of "Conversations with Death", which was recorded in 2017 by American metal bands Khemmis and Spirit Adrift.

== Reception ==
Aggregate review scores
| Game | Year | Metacritic | OpenCritic |
|---|---|---|---|
| Man of Medan | 2019 (PS4, Win, XONE); 2022 (PS5, XSXS); 2023 (Switch) | PS4: 69/100; Win: 75/100; XONE: 69/100 | 45% recommend |
| Little Hope | 2020 (PS4, Win, XONE); 2022 (PS5, XSXS); 2023 (Switch) | PS4: 71/100; Win: 73/100; XONE: 65/100 | 50% recommend |
| House of Ashes | 2021 (PS4, PS5, Win, XONE, XSXS) | PS4: 74/100; PS5: 72/100; Win: 73/100; XSXS: 74/100 | 59% recommend |
| The Devil in Me | 2022 (PS4, PS5, Win, XONE, XSXS) | PS5: 69/100; Win: 69/100; XSXS: 79/100 | 55% recommend |
| Switchback VR | 2023 (PS5) | 64/100 | 41% recommend |
| Directive 8020 | 2026 (PS5, Win, XSXS) | PS5: 72/100; Win: 73/100; XSXS: 68/100 | 53% recommend |

=== Sales ===
During its debut week, Man of Medan was the third best-selling physical game in the UK, and the best-selling in Europe, the Middle East, Africa, and Asia and reached one million copies sold worldwide after a year on sale. Little Hope's physical sales for its first week in the UK were 47% lower than Man of Medan's; GamesIndustry.biz commented that this may in part be due to the COVID-19 pandemic, which led to a larger number of players buying digital versions of video games than in previous years.
