= The Dark Pictures Anthology: The Devil in Me =

2022 video game

- Box art featuring Kate Wilder, one of the game's five protagonists
- Developer: Supermassive Games
- Publisher: Bandai Namco Entertainment
- Director: Tom Heaton
- Designers: Dan Saxon; Dave Grove
- Programmers: Prasanna Jeganathan; Romain Toutain
- Artist: David Hirst
- Writer: Seth M. Sherwood
- Composer: Jason Graves
- Series: The Dark Pictures Anthology
- Engine: Unreal Engine 4
- Platforms: PlayStation 4; PlayStation 5; Windows; Xbox One; Xbox Series X/S
- Release: 18 November 2022
- Genres: Interactive drama, survival horror
- Modes: Single-player, multiplayer

The Dark Pictures Anthology: The Devil in Me is a 2022 interactive drama and survival horror video game developed by Supermassive Games and published by Bandai Namco Entertainment. It is the fourth game of The Dark Pictures Anthology. The Devil in Me is set in a modern-day replica of H. H. Holmes's "Murder Castle" on an island in Lake Michigan. The narrative follows a documentary film crew who must survive a labyrinth of deadly traps set by a copycat serial killer. Reappearing in The Devil in Me are staple mechanics of the anthology, such as quick time events, two single-player and two multiplayer modes, and collectables that allow the player to see visions of possible future events. The game deviates from the stricter linearity of previous entries by introducing expanded exploration capabilities, including running, jumping, and climbing, alongside tool-based puzzles and a character inventory system. It features a multilinear plot in which decisions can alter the trajectory of the story and change the relationships between the five playable protagonists; some choices lead to their permanent deaths.

The game's premise was inspired by the mythos of Holmes, while its horror elements drew upon various classic horror and slasher films and franchises including Psycho, The Shining, Saw, Halloween, and Friday the 13th. The development team built physical sets for the actors during motion capture to accommodate the new movement systems. Jessie Buckley, who plays investigative journalist Kate Wilder, was marketed as the game's leading actress. Jason Graves, a long-time collaborator with Supermassive for the series, composed the soundtrack using mechanical sounds and classical music to reflect the killer's nature.

The Devil in Me was released for PlayStation 4, PlayStation 5, Windows, Xbox One, and Xbox Series X/S on 18 November 2022, to mixed reviews. Critics praised the Murder Castle setting, the macabre environmental traps, and the audio design, but directed criticism towards the cumbersome execution of the new exploration mechanics, sluggish pacing, and various technical faults. The fifth game in the series, Directive 8020, was revealed in a teaser trailer at the end of The Devil in Me and released on 12 May 2026.

== Gameplay ==
The game introduced a new inventory system to the series wherein characters have specific items for solving puzzles. Shown is Charlie using his business card to unlock a drawer.

The Dark Pictures Anthology: The Devil in Me is an interactive drama and survival horror game played from a third-person perspective. The player controls five members of a documentary film crew and navigates a modern-day replica of H. H. Holmes's "Murder Castle". The perspective shifts among the protagonists as they explore the hotel, evade traps, and attempt to survive a masked killer. The game deviates from the stricter linearity of the previous entries in the The Dark Pictures Anthology by incorporating expanded exploration mechanics; characters can now run, jump, mantle over obstacles, squeeze through tight spaces, and balance across beams. The hotel's architecture occasionally shifts, with the killer sliding walls to disorient the player. The Devil in Me introduces an inventory system and assigns distinct tools to each protagonist to help with solving environmental puzzles to progress. For example, Charlie, the director of the crew, can use a business card to open locked drawers; Mark, who is the cameraman, uses his camera to document evidence; and Jamie, who is the grip, can rewire electrical panels using a multimeter.

Action sequences often rely on quick time events (QTEs), which require the player to input timed button presses to dodge attacks, overcome hazards, or maintain stealth in designated hiding spots. Failing these events can lead to a character's permanent death, and the narrative will continue regardless of who dies. The player makes dialogue and action choices within a time limit, which alter character relationships and the overarching trajectory of the plot. The game tracks the consequences of these choices through a menu system called Bearings, which maps the narrative branches.

The player can find hidden collectables that expand upon the hotel's lore, as well as framed pictures that trigger premonitions of possible future events. The game also includes coins called obols, which act as an in-game currency to unlock character and scene dioramas. Throughout the narrative, a character known as the Curator appears in periodic cutscenes to observe the player's decisions and offer cryptic hints regarding upcoming events. The game includes both single-player and multiplayer modes, which allow players to experience the narrative solo or cooperatively.

== Synopsis ==
=== Setting and prologue ===
The Devil in Me's plot centres around the myth of H. H. Holmes, an American serial killer who operated the World's Fair Hotel in Chicago during the late 19th century. The hotel was built between 1887 and 1892 and was purported to be a "Murder Castle" filled with traps for unsuspecting guests. After his capture, Holmes confessed to numerous murders and claimed he "was born with the devil in me". The prologue takes place during the 1893 Chicago World's Fair, as newlyweds Jeff and Marie Whitman check into the hotel for their honeymoon. Holmes separates the couple and traps them within the building's shifting rooms before murdering them both. Following the prologue, an observer known as the Curator introduces himself to the player and outlines the story's premise.

=== Characters ===
The game's five protagonists are Kate Wilder (Jessie Buckley), an investigative journalist and the presenter for a documentary film crew; Charlie Lonnit (Paul Kaye), the show's director and owner of Lonnit Entertainment; Kate's ex-boyfriend and cameraman Mark Nestor (Fehinti Balogun); grip Jamie Tiergan (Gloria Obianyo); and audio production intern Erin Keenan (Nikki Patel).

The Devil in Me focuses on three interpersonal dynamics: Kate and Mark's unresolved romantic tension, Charlie's strained relationship with his subordinates, and a developing romance between Jamie and Erin. Following a recent breakup, Kate and Mark struggle to maintain a professional working environment; player choices dictate whether they exacerbate this tension or rekindle their relationship. Charlie experiences nicotine withdrawal. His resulting irritability and focus on completing the documentary alienate the crew—particularly Kate, who believes his direction harms her career. Jamie and Erin nurture a budding romance. Through dialogue choices, the player can develop this connection into a full romance.

=== Main plot ===
The Lonnit Entertainment film crew are struggling to produce their documentary series and accept an invitation from a reclusive benefactor, Granthem Du'Met. He offers them exclusive access to his estate on Hunter's Island in Lake Michigan, which features a modern replica of H. H. Holmes's "Murder Castle". Shortly after the crew arrives, Du'Met abruptly abandons them by departing on the island's only ferry.

The hotel enters a mechanical lockdown, which traps the crew within a maze of moving walls. A masked killer dressed as Holmes stalks the protagonists, psychologically tormenting them with animatronics of his past victims and forcing the crew to navigate deadly traps. As they explore the facility, the crew discovers their attacker is Hector Munday, an unstable former FBI profiler turned copycat killer. They learn that Munday perpetuates his murder cycle by forcing a surviving victim to act as his public façade; the man who lured the film crew to the island was actually Joseph Morello, a captive true-crime author acting as the current "Granthem Du'Met" in an attempt to save his family.

The crew navigates the island's exterior and activates a lighthouse to signal for help. They commandeer a boat to escape, but Munday intercepts them. The survivors fight him off in a final confrontation before the boat crashes and explodes, which allows them to swim to shore and await rescue. Alternatively, if player choices result in only Kate and Mark being captured, Munday forces Mark to lure the next group of victims to the island before executing the couple. In a post-credits epilogue, authorities recover Munday's mask, while a new group of victims receives an invitation.

== Development ==
The Devil in Me is the fourth game and the season one finale of The Dark Pictures Anthology, a series originally planned to span eight games. (Note: The anthology was originally planned to be broken down into seasons, but Supermassive dropped the concept during development on the next game, Directive 8020 (2026). Executive producer Dan McDonald stated in April 2026 that the original roadmap had shifted, which resulted in the studio no longer strictly adhering to an eight-game limit.) Director Tom Heaton explained that integrating tool-based puzzles and expanded movement systems was a deliberate choice to give the player more agency; he stated that forcing them to navigate the environment elevates their vulnerability and the game's horror. Heaton added that the game features more puzzles than previous entries. He compared the puzzles to early Resident Evil and Silent Hill titles, which were designed for the encounters to briefly entertain the player rather than completely halt progression.

The developers playtested the narrative branches using flowchart tools in a "lo-fi format" to ensure that the story's logic functioned correctly before recording the actors. The development team built sets that allowed the actors to physically interact with the environment by ducking and jumping over obstacles. Heaton stated that the game is longer than previous entries; while earlier games took around four and a half to five hours to complete, The Devil in Me lasts around seven hours.

=== Story and design ===
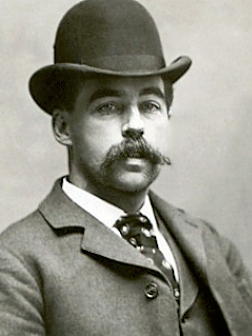
H. H. Holmes (circa 1880s)

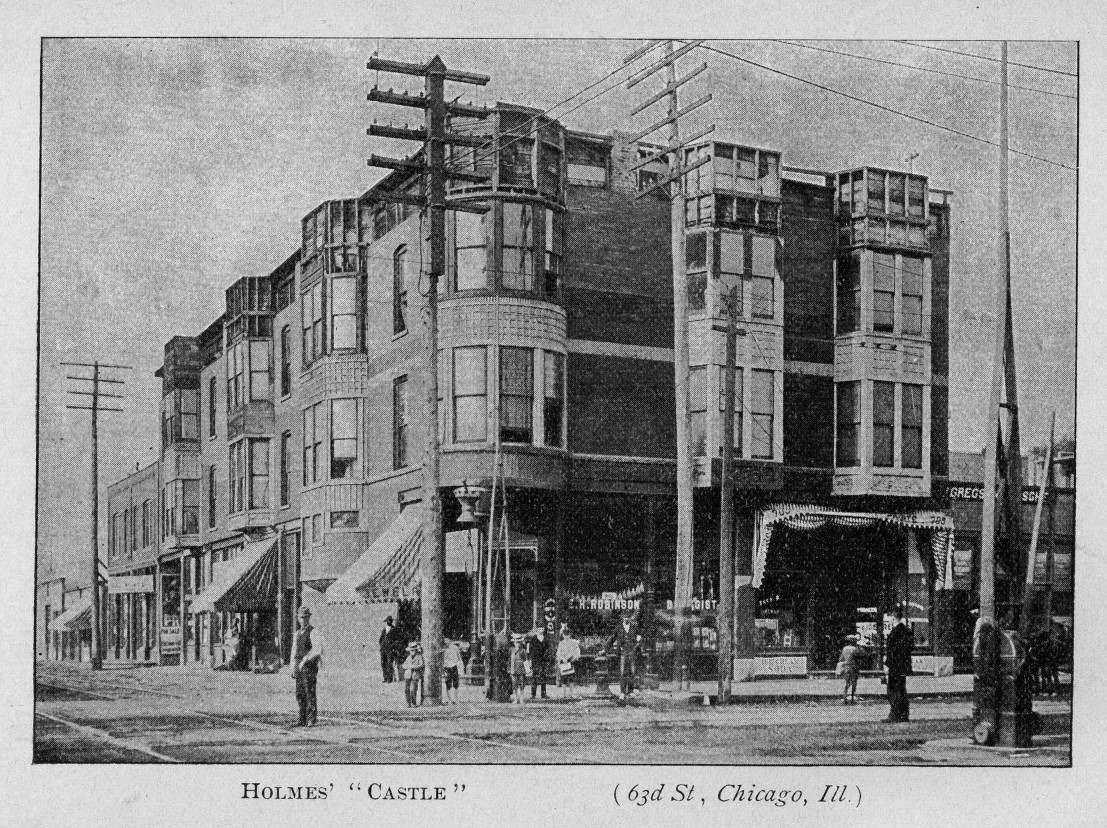
World's Fair Hotel (circa 1890s)

The game takes place in a modern replica of a hotel operated by the American serial killer H. H. Holmes. The original building, which serves as the setting for the game's prologue, was sensationalised by the press and was only rumoured to contain death traps.

Like previous entries, Supermassive designed The Devil in Me as a standalone story set within the anthology's shared universe; the developers included Easter eggs referencing the other games. The American serial killer H. H. Holmes and his "Murder Castle" primarily inspired the premise. The developers drew additional influence from classic horror and slasher film franchises, including Psycho (1960), The Shining (1980), Saw, Halloween, and Friday the 13th. There are limited historical records of the original building's interior, so the art team modelled the hotel on period-accurate North American designs to match its known exterior. Heaton explained that this missing documentation afforded the developers the creative freedom to design the interior how they wanted. He revealed that setting the narrative in the modern day with a copycat killer circumvented historical constraints, which gave the writers similar creative liberty. The team incorporated hidden corridors and mechanical sliding walls into the Victorian architecture to heighten the horror and create a labyrinthine environment that actively shifts to disorient the player.

The game pivots from the supernatural elements of previous entries. The team focused on a human antagonist to create a more grounded psychological threat. They conceptualised the killer as a methodical copycat who emulates Holmes's methods by luring the protagonists into environmental traps, rather than relying on chase sequences. These scenarios include a room-sized incinerator, a dual-chamber trap filling with noxious gas, and two characters forced into a deadly tug-of-war against a central spinning blade. Despite the lethal nature of these encounters, the developers ensured it was always possible for the player to save every character. Supermassive designed the narrative around a "golden path" following a traditional horror film structure; in this version of the story, character deaths are scattered throughout the plot, which typically leaves only a lone survivor by the end. The studio featured a true-crime documentary crew to ground the story in a realistic workplace dynamic. Heaton explained that focusing on a small, interconnected group of coworkers allowed the writers to integrate internal rivalries and romantic tensions. The team designed the killer to exploit these fractured relationships by using the environment to isolate the crew and psychologically torment them.

=== Casting ===
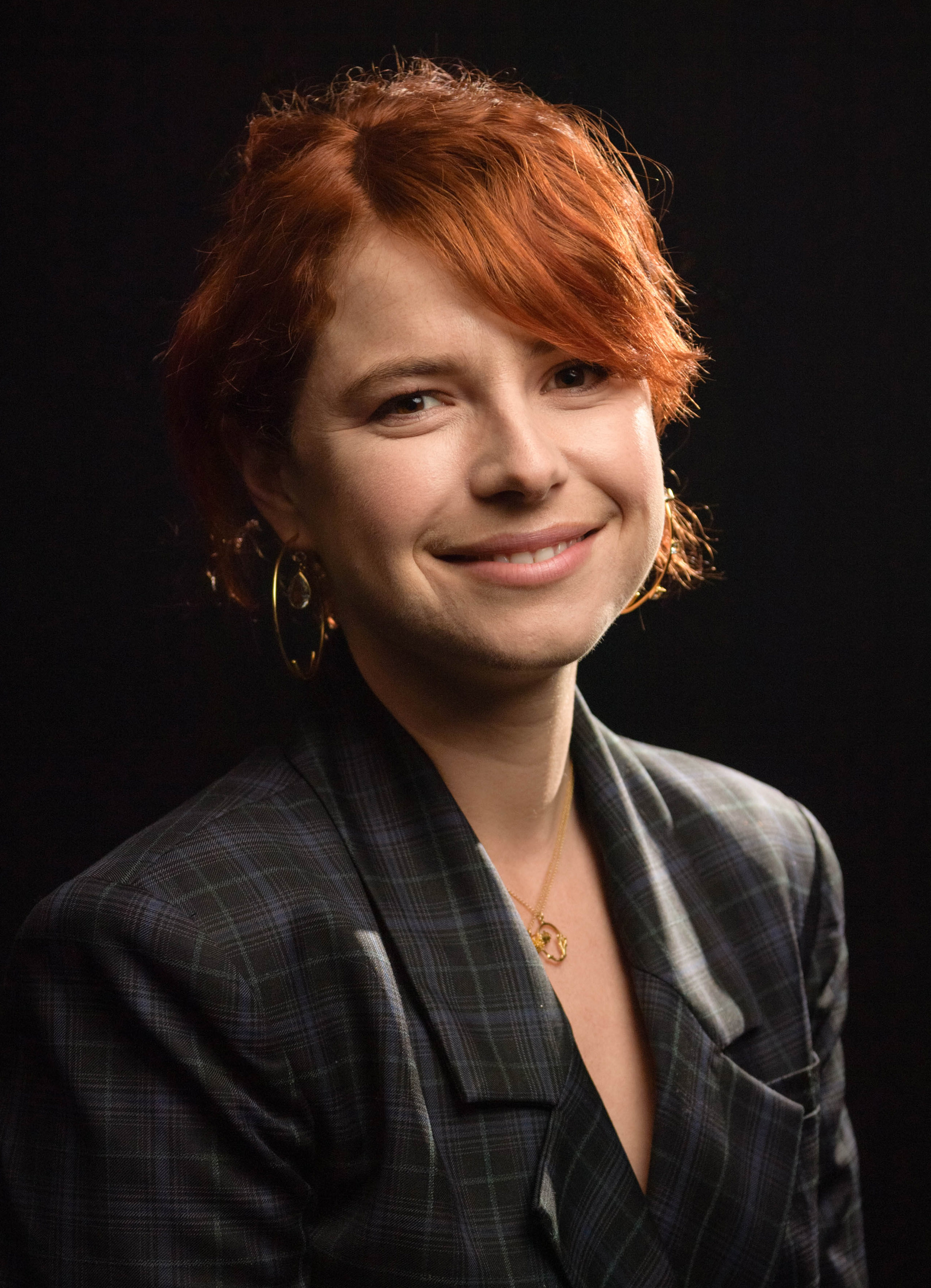
Jessie Buckley (pictured in 2019), who plays Kate Wilder, was marketed as the game's leading actress.

Supermassive hired a performance director to assist with auditions and casting. Heaton also helped the actors understand the script and navigate the complexities of performing within a branching narrative. The game continues the anthology's trend of casting a recognisable actor as the lead. The studio selected Jessie Buckley to portray investigative journalist Kate Wilder. Heaton stated that the team was fortunate to cast Buckley before her Academy Award nomination after recognising her potential from her previous television and film work.

Supermassive sought an actor capable of balancing Kate's ambition with her emotional vulnerability. According to Heaton, Buckley faced a steep learning curve during production. She had not watched a horror film in over twenty years and never played a video game. She had to adapt to both the performance capture process and the script. Buckley explained that her lack of gaming experience made the project feel novel, though she was surprised by the volume of the branching narrative compared to traditional film and television. She described Kate as a vulnerable, yet ambitious fighter and added that the character's human side grounds her journey to uncover the truth about Holmes.

=== Music and sound design ===
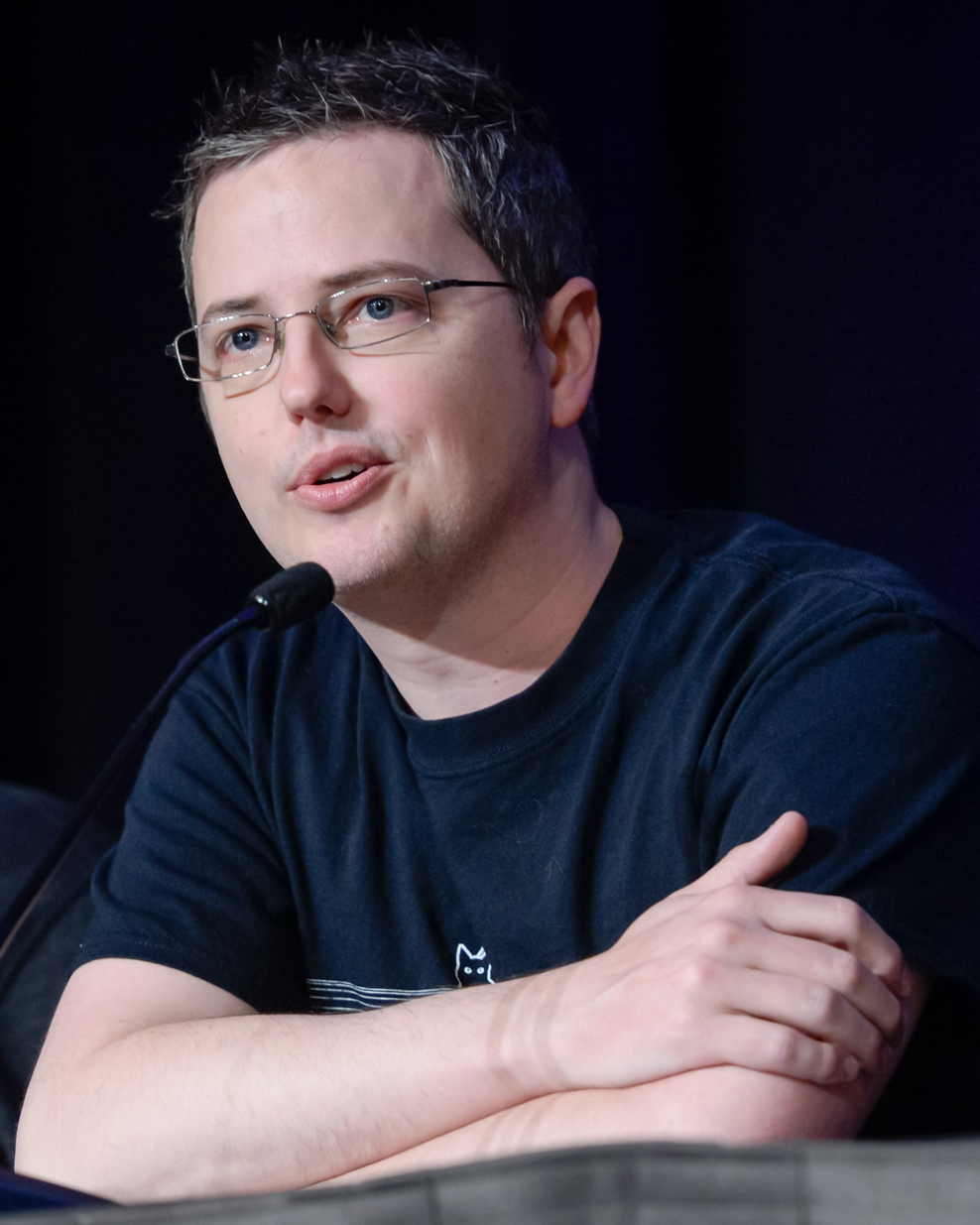
Jason Graves (pictured in 2016) reprises his role as composer for The Dark Pictures Anthology.

Jason Graves returned to compose the music after scoring the previous entries in the series. He recorded a mix of string and percussion instruments alongside synthesisers, a harp, and a piano. Graves underscored the killer's deliberate movements and the hotel's animatronic mannequins with slow-paced, "ticking" sounds to reflect the narrative's shift towards a methodical, human antagonist,. He incorporated diegetic classical music and opera played through old gramophones during murder sequences to create a historical counterpoint; this stylistic choice reflects the killer's self-perception as a dramatic artist. The soundtrack uses distinct styles for different environments and features a film noir-inspired "throwback" sound for the island's exterior and modern distortion with "skipping" synthesisers for the inner chambers.

The audio team recorded Foley and sound effects to emphasise the hotel's aging Victorian architecture. Audio director Barney Pratt and his team overhauled the character Foley systems and introduced a breathing mechanic that reacts to a protagonist's stress and exhaustion levels. The developers also recorded various door mechanisms and creaking floorboards. As characters ascend to the hotel's higher, unfinished levels, the creaking's frequency increases to signal growing structural instability. The sound designers interspersed abstract elements—including bowed metal and electromagnetic recordings—with modern distortion to conceptually link the historical setting with the modern-day narrative.

=== Release ===
Supermassive first revealed The Devil in Me in a post-credits teaser trailer at the end of House of Ashes, which was released on 22 October 2021. A story trailer premiered on 7 July 2022, followed by a character trailer in early November. Following a hands-on preview period, Bandai Namco Entertainment released the game on 18 November 2022 for PlayStation 4, PlayStation 5, Xbox One, Xbox Series X/S, and Windows. An Animatronic Collector's Edition was available exclusively through the Bandai Namco Store and included a copy of the game, a collector's box, and an 11-centimetre-tall animatronic bust, among other items. A post-credits teaser trailer revealed the next instalment in the series, Directive 8020, which was released on 12 May 2026. During its launch week in the United Kingdom, The Devil in Me debuted at number 16 on the all-formats boxed charts, experiencing slightly higher physical launch sales than House of Ashes. Switchback VR, a spinoff game of the anthology for PlayStation VR2, includes levels for each of the anthology's first four games, including The Devil in Me.

== Reception ==
Reception

Aggregate scores
Aggregator	Score
Metacritic	PC: 69/100; PS5: 69/100; XSXS: 79/100
OpenCritic	55% recommend

Review scores
Publication	Score
GameSpot	7/10
Hardcore Gamer	4/5
IGN	5/10
NME	4/5
Push Square	6/10
RPGFan	68/100
Shacknews	5/10
VG247	3/5

The Devil in Me received "mixed or average" reception for Windows and PlayStation 5, and "generally favourable" reception for Xbox Series X, according to the review aggregator website Metacritic, while 55% of critics recommended the game according to OpenCritic. Critics appreciated the Murder Castle setting and the true crime documentary premise. Cass Marshall of Polygon praised the game's exploration of modern true crime obsession, describing the premise of a copycat killer exploiting this reverence as "genuinely creepy". Multiple critics cited the environmental traps and praised the game's ability to generate tension, and drew favourable comparisons to the Saw films. The layout and an increased emphasis on exploration frustrated other critics. Ruth Cassidy of Eurogamer and Matt Kamen of Empire found that navigating the hotel dragged. They argued that these sequences functioned as tedious padding rather than enhancing the horror.

The introduction of new movement and inventory mechanics drew a divided response. Several critics viewed these additions favourably and felt that they provided a welcome shift in the gameplay style. Meg Pelliccio of TheGamer appreciated the increased freedom to explore and the organic integration of character-specific tools. Reviewers found the expanded mechanics cumbersome. Tristan Ogilvie of IGN and Larryn Bell of Shacknews argued that the ability to run, vault, and push objects felt rigid and grew tiresome over the course of the campaign. Fraser Brown of PC Gamer criticised the interaction design and singled out instances where missing button prompts halted exploration.

Reviewers were divided regarding the documentary crew. Critics praised the character writing, with Mark Delaney of GameSpot lauding the cast as the best in the series. Other reviewers described the crew as unlikable and difficult to empathise with, which diminished the player's desire to keep them alive. While the initial setup and prologue drew a positive response, some critics felt the overarching story suffered from a sluggish pace. Kelsey Raynor of VG247 and Alice Bell of Rock Paper Shotgun argued that the narrative lost momentum and emotional weight in the final third of the game.

Technical faults drew widespread criticism; many reviewers documented frequent bugs, erratic camera angles, and environmental glitches. Brown experienced issues with the cooperative multiplayer modes, and encountered sliding character models, malfunctioning QTEs, and broken game progression. Reviewers praised the audio design's ability to build tension. Alejandro Morillas of IGN Spain highlighted the ambient effects and described his playthrough with headphones as "one of the most terrifying experiences of the year". Other critics argued that the visual elements failed to match this quality, and described the facial animations as stiff and a step backwards from Supermassive's previous title, The Quarry (2022).

At the 2022 Gamescom Awards, The Devil in Me received nominations for Best Multiplayer Game, Most Wanted Sony PlayStation Game, and Most Wanted Microsoft Xbox Game. In 2023, it won Best Action and Adventure Game at the TIGA Awards.
