= The Dark Pictures: Switchback VR =

2023 video game

- Cover art
- Developer: Supermassive Games
- Publisher: Supermassive Games
- Directors: Alejandro Arque Gallardo; Will Doyle
- Producer: Peter Szegedi
- Designers: Sofia Romualdo; Cordelia Chui
- Programmers: Edwin Bell; Volodymyr Shafran
- Artist: David Hirst
- Writers: Andrew Ewington; Vicky Wheeler
- Composer: Jason Graves
- Series: The Dark Pictures Anthology
- Engine: Unreal Engine 4
- Platform: PlayStation 5
- Release: 16 March 2023
- Genre: Rail shooter
- Mode: Single-player

The Dark Pictures: Switchback VR is a rail shooter video game developed and published by Supermassive Games for the PlayStation VR2. It was released on 16 March 2023. It is a spin-off of The Dark Pictures Anthology and features the player riding a horror-themed roller coaster.

It is a spiritual sequel to the 2016 VR game Until Dawn: Rush of Blood, which was also a game released near the original PlayStation VR's launch.

== Gameplay ==
The game is a spin-off from The Dark Pictures Anthology and features various locations from the four games.

Much like the previous rail shooter, the player is armed with a set of pistols to shoot targets, objects and enemies, shooting boxes that give brief upgrades to their guns (semi-automatic, shotgun, etc.). In this game, particularly in the third-through-eighth levels, the player is given special items (namely the UV light, Flare Gun and Stun Gun) to aid in overcoming specific obstacles and solving puzzles/utilizing environmental mechanics.

Players shoot switches on the rollercoaster track to alter course and make important decisions that will determine the player's fate. In addition, the player has to solve puzzles to save the other passengers, who can either die, be abandoned by the player, or be saved depending on how the player solves the puzzle. The characters' fates cannot be reversed should they die or be abandoned.

== Synopsis ==
The game is played from the perspective of a passenger on a train, who encounters a young woman before the train crashes while they listen to a voicemail from their sister, who planned on meeting up with them at an amusement park to commemorate their father's death. Heavily injured and on the verge of death, the player falls into limbo as they find themselves in a series of rail rides called "The Inferno" (with multiple locations correlating to previous games from the Dark Pictures series). Throughout the game they use various tricks and tools (such as the UV light, Flare Gun and Stun Gun) to progress and solve puzzles to possibly save the souls of the other passengers on the train. All the while they are being watched by the Curator at certain points and being taunted by a demonic entity.

The game begins on the Chinese coast, where they pass through the wreckages of various ships, encountering a fellow passenger trapped in a flooding box who dies if the player is unable to stop the water flow. In the center of the SS Ourang Medan, the player defeats the ghostly Sailor Girl, even as she taps into her telekinetic powers. They next arrive in the abandoned town of Little Hope, where they face the demons of its past, and where they encounter another passenger tied to a stake who will burn alive if she isn't freed by the destruction of the ropes holding her. Entering the church, the player faces the Burned Demon to escape. In the cavernous ruined temples beneath the Akkadian Desert, the player finds themselves in the caves housing the crash site of an alien vessel, where they can choose to save a third passenger from a falling cage death trap or not (by weakening certain supports to lower it closer to a cliff). They fight the hordes of vampires and alien parasites as they reach the alien nest, eventually culminating in a standoff with The Ancient One, the Akkadian soldier Balathu, who had been turned into a vampiric creature over 4000 years ago. In the fourth area, the player enters the replica of H.H. Holmes' World's Fair Hotel, encountering scores of serial killer Granthem Du'Met's android replicas and several of his traps, some of which the player must use to hold off his minions; the player also must use the Stun Gun to hit the correct fuse boxes to save themselves and possibly another passenger in a massive room, if they choose to; the passenger will likely die from electrocution if the player guesses wrong too many times. Entering the killer's lair, they are stuck in a series of death traps from Du'Met, but the player defeats him by turning the death traps back on him, killing Du'Met. After leaving the hotel, the player is confronted by the mysterious young woman.

In the final level, the player finds themselves in a Frozen Hell, where the young woman on the train reveals herself to be the demoness Belial, Mother of Lies. Depending on how the player dealt with the other train passengers (whether the player saved them or abandoned/killed them), Belial will comment on their decisions. With aid from the souls they saved (should the player choose to save them) and the use of a special spirit gun they steal from Belial, the player confronts Belial in a final battle for their soul.

There are two endings, which depend on how quickly the player is able to defeat Belial in the Frozen Hell. If the player takes too long, then the player will die in the train crash and Belial will drag their soul to hell with her, with the Curator appearing behind the fireman in the train. If the player is quick enough, then they will survive the experience and escape the nightmare as Belial is banished back to hell, with the player awakening in the wreckage as a firefighter appears to save them.

== Development ==
In February 2022, Supermassive Games filed trademarks for six potential future entries, including Switchback. Unlike previous entries of the series, it is not published by Bandai Namco Entertainment, instead being self-published by Supermassive Games. The game was originally planned to release alongside the PlayStation VR2 headset on 22 February 2023, but Supermassive Games announced in January 2023 that the game's release would be delayed until 16 March 2023.

== Reception ==
Reception

Aggregate scores
Aggregator	Score
Metacritic	64/100 (PS5)
OpenCritic	41% recommend
