= Jason Graves =

American composer

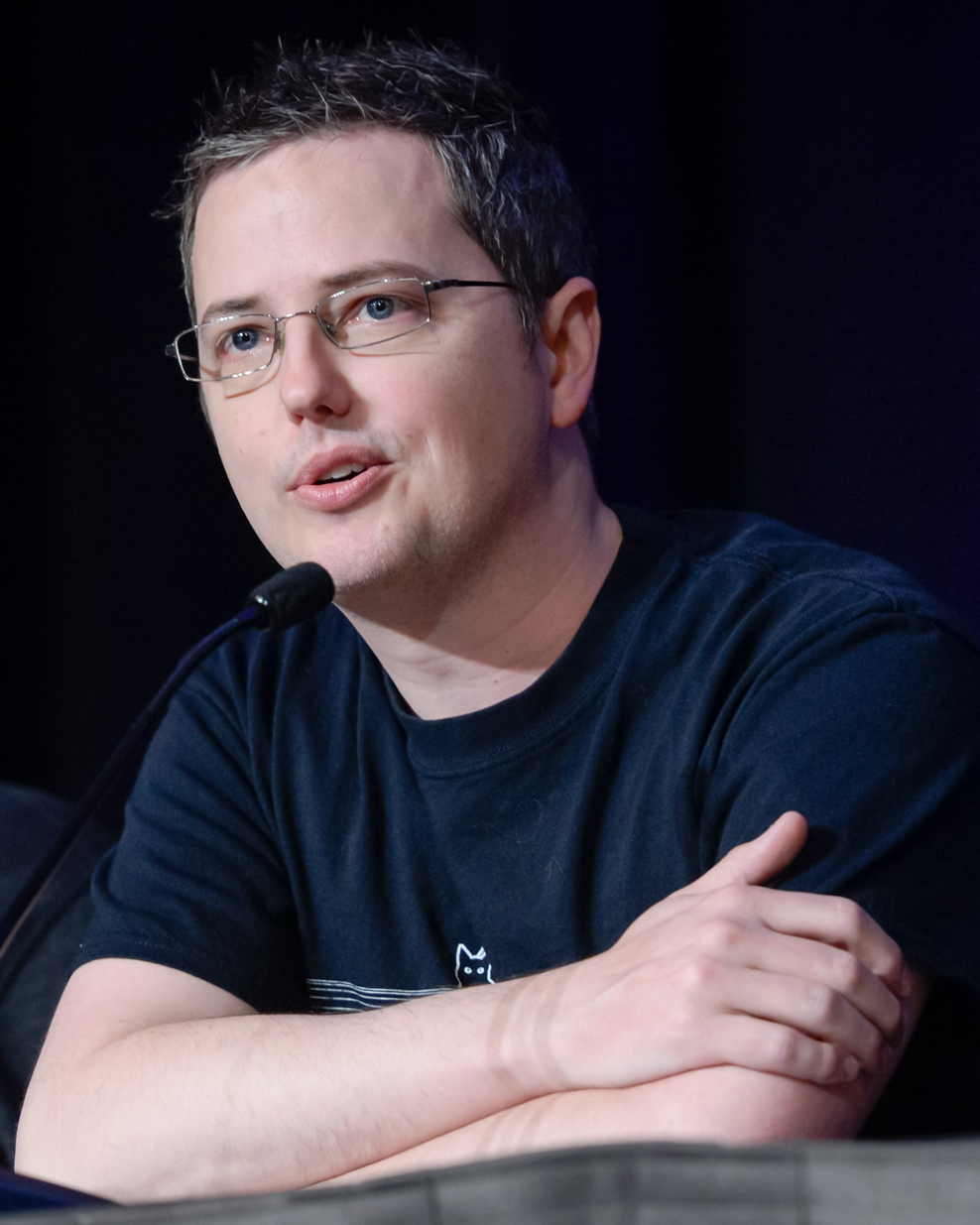
- Graves at the Game Developers Conference (GDC) in March 2016

Background information
- Genres: Video game music; film score; classical; rock; electronic
- Occupations: Composer; conductor; arranger; musician
- Years active: 1993–present
- Labels: Materia Collective, Sumthing Else
- Website: jasongraves.com

Jason Graves is an American television, film, and video game composer. His works include the musical scores for Dead Space, Alpha Protocol, Tomb Raider, The Order: 1886, Until Dawn, Evolve, Dungeon Siege, and Far Cry Primal.

== Video games ==
Year	Title	Developer	Publisher
2003	The Hobbit	Inevitable Entertainment	Vivendi Universal Games; Sierra Entertainment
2005	Rise of the Kasai	BottleRocket Entertainment	Sony Computer Entertainment
2005	Gauntlet: Seven Sorrows	Midway Games	Midway Games
2005	Dora the Explorer: Journey to the Purple Planet	Monkey Bar Games	Global Star Software
2006	Rise and Fall: Civilizations at War	Stainless Steel Studios; Midway Studios San Diego	Midway Games
2006	Star Trek: Encounters	4J Studios	Bethesda Softworks; Ubisoft
2006	Flushed Away	Monkey Bar Games	D3 Publisher
2006	Star Trek: Legacy	Mad Doc Software	Bethesda Softworks
2006	Star Trek: Tactical Assault	Quicksilver Software	Bethesda Softworks
2006	Blazing Angels: Squadrons of WWII	Ubisoft Bucharest	Ubisoft
2007	Blazing Angels 2: Secret Missions of WWII	Ubisoft Bucharest	Ubisoft
2007	Transformers Decepticons	Vicarious Visions	Activision
2007	Transformers Autobots	Vicarious Visions	Activision
2007	Hour of Victory	N-Fusion Interactive	Midway Games
2007	Dead Head Fred	Vicious Cycle Software	D3 Publisher
2007	BlackSite: Area 51	Midway Austin	Midway Games
2007	Star Trek: Conquest	4J Studios	Bethesda Softworks
2008	Dead Space	EA Redwood Shores	Electronic Arts
2009	Dead Space: Extraction	Visceral Games; Eurocom	Electronic Arts
2009	Arthur and the Revenge of Maltazard	Phoenix Studio	Ubisoft
2010	Silent Hunter 5: Battle of the Atlantic	Ubisoft Bucharest	Ubisoft
2010	Command & Conquer 4: Tiberian Twilight	EA Los Angeles	Electronic Arts
2010	City of Heroes: Going Rogue	Paragon Studios	NCSoft
2010	Alpha Protocol	Obsidian Entertainment	Sega
2010	Dead Space Ignition	Megatube; Sumo Digital	Electronic Arts
2011	Dead Space 2	Visceral Games	Electronic Arts
2011	Dead Space (mobile game)	IronMonkey Studios	Electronic Arts
2011	Might & Magic Heroes VI	Black Hole Entertainment	Ubisoft
2011	Section 8: Prejudice	TimeGate Studios	TimeGate Studios
2011	Dungeon Siege III	Obsidian Entertainment	Square Enix
2011	F.E.A.R. 3	Day 1 Studios	Warner Bros. Interactive Entertainment
2012	Resistance: Burning Skies	Nihilistic Software	Sony Computer Entertainment
2013	Dead Space 3	Visceral Games	Electronic Arts
2013	Tomb Raider	Crystal Dynamics	Square Enix
2013	DmC: Devil May Cry (Vergil's Downfall DLC)	Ninja Theory	Capcom
2014	Murdered: Soul Suspect	Airtight Games	Square Enix
2015	Evolve	Turtle Rock Studios	2K Games
2015	The Order: 1886	Ready at Dawn; Santa Monica Studio	Sony Computer Entertainment
2015	Breach and Clear Deadline	Mighty Rabbit Studios; Gun Media	Gambitious Digital Entertainment; Devolver Digital
2015	Until Dawn	Supermassive Games	Sony Computer Entertainment
2016	Far Cry Primal	Ubisoft Montreal	Ubisoft
2016	Until Dawn: Rush of Blood	Supermassive Games	Sony Interactive Entertainment
2017	Lone Echo	Ready at Dawn	Oculus Studios
2017	LawBreakers	Boss Key Productions	Nexon
2018	Moss	Polyarc	Polyarc
2019	The Dark Pictures Anthology: Man of Medan	Supermassive Games	Bandai Namco Entertainment
2020	The Dark Pictures Anthology: Little Hope	Supermassive Games	Bandai Namco Entertainment
2020	Warframe	Digital Extremes	Digital Extremes
2021	Lone Echo II	Ready at Dawn	Oculus Studios
2021	The Dark Pictures Anthology: House of Ashes	Supermassive Games	Bandai Namco Entertainment
2022	Moss: Book II	Polyarc	Polyarc
2022	Hard West 2	Ice Code Games	Good Shepherd Entertainment
2022	The Dark Pictures Anthology: The Devil in Me	Supermassive Games	Bandai Namco Entertainment
2024	Still Wakes the Deep	The Chinese Room	Secret Mode
2026	Directive 8020	Supermassive Games	Supermassive Games
2026	Call of Duty: Modern Warfare 4	Infinity Ward	Activision
TBA	No Rest for the Wicked	Moon Studios	Private Division
