= Supermassive Games =

British video game developer

Supermassive Games Limited
- Type: Subsidiary
- Industry: Video games
- Founded: 2008; 18 years ago
- Founder: Pete Samuels; Joe Samuels
- Headquarters: Guildford, Surrey, England
- Products: Until Dawn; The Dark Pictures Anthology; The Quarry; The Casting of Frank Stone
- Number of employees: 350 (2023)
- Parent: Nordisk Film (2022–present)
- Website: Supermassive Games

Supermassive Games Limited is a British video game developer based in Guildford, Surrey. The studio is known for developing horror games such as Until Dawn for Sony Interactive Entertainment, The Dark Pictures Anthology for Bandai Namco Entertainment, The Quarry for 2K Games, and The Casting of Frank Stone for Behaviour Interactive.

== History ==
Supermassive Games was founded in 2008 by Pete Samuels, who had previously worked at Psygnosis and Electronic Arts. The company signed a contract to serve as a second-party developer for Sony. The studio first worked on downloadable content for Media Molecule's LittleBigPlanet, and games utilizing the PlayStation Move motion controller including Sackboy's Prehistoric Moves and Start the Party!. The strategy was a success initially, as the studio posted full-year sales of £5.7 million in 2011. In 2012, the studio partnered with BBC and released Doctor Who: The Eternity Clock. It was intended to be the first game of a trilogy, but the game was poorly received. BBC then announced the decision to cancel all other games in the trilogy in the following year. Another partnership game with BBC, Wonderbook: Walking with Dinosaurs, was released in 2013.

The studio's breakout title, Until Dawn, was also initially envisioned as a PlayStation Move title, though all motion controls were dropped when it was retooled into a PlayStation 4 game. Until Dawn is a survival horror interactive movie inspired by slasher films, and it became an unexpected success for Sony when it was released in 2015. With the success of Until Dawn, the studio continued to expand the Until Dawn universe, releasing spin-off titles including Until Dawn: Rush of Blood and The Inpatient for PlayStation VR (PS VR), Sony's virtual reality headset. The studio also released the critically panned Bravo Team for PS VR. Supermassive initially wanted it to be "the game which defines shooters on VR", but it faced various development challenges throughout its development cycle.

Supermassive returned to the horror genre when it partnered with publisher Bandai Namco Entertainment to create an anthology series called The Dark Pictures Anthology. The first game in the series, The Dark Pictures: Man of Medan, was released in August 2019. Unlike Supermassive's previous titles, all but two of which were available exclusively on Sony platforms, all games in the Dark Pictures series will also be available on Microsoft platforms including Windows and Xbox One. Supermassive plans on releasing a new entry in The Dark Pictures Anthology every 6 months, with a total of 8 games in the series, though more could be added if the series succeeds in sales. Man of Medan was followed by Little Hope (2020), House of Ashes (2021) and The Devil in Me (2022), which concluded the first season. Supermassive also released The Quarry in 2022, a standalone game envisioned as a spiritual successor to Until Dawn inspired by teen slasher and monster films.

In March 2021, Nordisk Film, under their Nordisk Games division, purchased a 30.7% stake in the studio. In July 2022, Nordisk Games fully acquired Supermassive Games, making Supermassive a subsidiary of the Denmark-based company.

In January 2024, it was reported that the company co-founders left the company. In February 2024, Jason Schreier of Bloomberg News reported that Supermassive Games had informed 150 employees that they were at risk of layoffs, ultimately cutting 90 personnel.

== Video games ==
Supermassive Games has produced interactive horror dramas including Until Dawn, The Dark Pictures Anthology, and The Quarry.
