= List of games by Supermassive Games =

The current logo of Supermassive Games

Supermassive Games is a British video game developer based in Guildford, Surrey. The company was co-founded by brothers Pete and Joe Samuels in 2008; Pete was chief executive officer, while Joe was the studio's commercial director. The brothers both stepped down from their roles in 2024. Until 2018 Supermassive worked almost exclusively with Sony Interactive Entertainment, first working on downloadable content for Media Molecule's LittleBigPlanet. The studio published their first game, Big Match Striker, in September 2010. It was free-to-play and put players head-to-head in a combination of football management strategy and trivia. Supermassive worked on multiple games that utilised the PlayStation Move motion controller including Start the Party! and Sackboy's Prehistoric Moves, both of which were released in 2010. In 2012, the studio partnered with the BBC and released Doctor Who: The Eternity Clock. It was intended to be the first game of a trilogy, but it was poorly received. The BBC announced the decision to cancel the other two games the following year. However, another partnership game with the BBC, Wonderbook: Walking with Dinosaurs, was released in 2013.

In 2015, the studio released their breakout title, Until Dawn, which won the BAFTA Games Award for Original Property in 2016. The game was initially envisioned as a PlayStation Move title, but all motion controls were dropped when it was retooled into a PlayStation 4 game. Until Dawn is a teen survival horror game inspired by slasher films, and it became an unexpected success for Sony. With the success of Until Dawn, the studio continued to expand the universe, releasing two spin-off titles; Until Dawn: Rush of Blood (2016) and The Inpatient (2018), for PlayStation VR, Sony's virtual reality headset. In January 2024, a remake of Until Dawn was announced for PlayStation 5 and Windows, and released on 4 October. Although Supermassive did not develop the remake, the game was developed by Ballistic Moon, which had multiple former Supermassive leads on the team. A film adaptation of the game was released in theaters on 24 April 2025. The studio also released the critically panned Bravo Team (2018) for PS VR. Supermassive initially wanted it to be "the game which defines shooters on VR", but it faced various challenges throughout its development cycle. In December 2018, Supermassive published Shattered State. The game was developed in partnership with Google and released exclusively for Google Daydream.

The wordmark logo of The Dark Pictures Anthology

At Gamescom in 2018, Supermassive announced that they were returning to the horror genre, partnering with publisher Bandai Namco Entertainment to create an anthology series called The Dark Pictures Anthology. Supermassive originally planned to release a new entry in the series every six months. The studio originally planned to release eight games in the anthology, but executive producer Dan McDonald confirmed in April 2026 that the studio is no longer strictly adhering to an eight game cap. The first game, Man of Medan, was released in August 2019, followed by Little Hope in October 2020, House of Ashes in October 2021, and The Devil in Me in November 2022. A spin-off of the anthology, Switchback VR, was released on 16 March 2023 for the PlayStation VR2 as a spiritual successor of Rush of Blood and featured levels based on the first four games of the series. Directive 8020, the fifth game in the series, was released on 12 May 2026. Beginning with the game, Supermassive moved away from the anthology branding to emphasise that the games are standalone experiences.

After many years of mostly PlayStation exclusivity, the anthology was Supermassive's first venture into doing multi-platform releases. Initially, the games were released on PS4, Xbox One, and Windows. Starting with House of Ashes, the games were also released for PS5 and Xbox Series X/S. In September 2022 Supermassive released PS5 and Series X/S versions of Man of Medan and Little Hope. Both games also received Nintendo Switch versions in 2023.

Supermassive released the standalone game The Quarry in 2022. The game is inspired by slasher and monster films, and is a spiritual successor to Until Dawn. In August 2023, Little Nightmares III was announced and it released on 10 October 2025. The Casting of Frank Stone, a game set in the Dead by Daylight universe, was revealed at the Game Awards 2023 and was released on 3 September 2024.

== Games ==
Supermassive Games has worked on over 20 games since 2008, and has multiple games in development.

List of games
| Title | System | Release date (Note: Some of the early games had staggered release dates across the world. In those cases, the UK date is used.) | Publisher(s) | Ref(s) |
|---|---|---|---|---|
| LittleBigPlanet (DLC) | PlayStation 3 | 2009–2010 | Sony Computer Entertainment | |
| Big Match Striker | Windows | 14 September 2010 | Supermassive Games | |
| Tumble | PlayStation 3 (PlayStation Move) | 14 September 2010 | Sony Computer Entertainment | |
| Start the Party! | PlayStation 3 (PlayStation Move) | 17 September 2010 | Sony Computer Entertainment | |
| Sackboy's Prehistoric Moves | PlayStation 3 (PlayStation Move) | 15 December 2010 | Sony Computer Entertainment | |
| Start the Party! Save the World | PlayStation 3 (PlayStation Move) | 25 November 2011 | Sony Computer Entertainment | |
| LittleBigPlanet 2 (DLC) | PlayStation 3 | 2011–2012 | Sony Computer Entertainment | |
| Doctor Who: The Eternity Clock | PlayStation 3 PlayStation Vita; Windows | 23 May 2012; 10 October 2012 (Vita); 15 November 2012 (PC) | BBC Worldwide; Sony Computer Entertainment Europe | |
| Killzone HD | PlayStation 3 | 24 October 2012 | Sony Computer Entertainment | |
| LittleBigPlanet PS Vita (DLC) | PlayStation Vita | 2012 | Sony Computer Entertainment | |
| Wonderbook: Walking with Dinosaurs | PlayStation 3 | 13 November 2013 | Sony Computer Entertainment | |
| Until Dawn | PlayStation 4 | 28 August 2015 | Sony Computer Entertainment | |
| Until Dawn: Rush of Blood | PlayStation 4 (PlayStation VR) | 13 October 2016 | Sony Interactive Entertainment | |
| Tumble VR | PlayStation 4 (PlayStation VR) | 13 October 2016 | Sony Computer Entertainment | |
| Hidden Agenda | PlayStation 4 | 22 November 2017 | Sony Interactive Entertainment | |
| The Inpatient | PlayStation 4 (PlayStation VR) | 24 January 2018 | Sony Interactive Entertainment | |
| Bravo Team | PlayStation 4 (PlayStation VR) | 16 March 2018 | Sony Interactive Entertainment | |
| Shattered State | Google Daydream | 14 December 2018 | Supermassive Games | |
| The Dark Pictures Anthology: Man of Medan | Nintendo Switch; PlayStation 4 PlayStation 5 Windows; Xbox One; Xbox Series X/S | 30 August 2019; 27 September 2022 (PS5, Series X/S); 4 May 2023 (Switch) | Bandai Namco Entertainment | |
| The Dark Pictures Anthology: Little Hope | Nintendo Switch; PlayStation 4 PlayStation 5 Windows; Xbox One; Xbox Series X/S | 30 October 2020; 27 September 2022 (PS5, Series X/S); 5 October 2023 (Switch) | Bandai Namco Entertainment | |
| Little Nightmares II: Enhanced Edition | PlayStation 5 Xbox Series X/S | 25 August 2021 | Bandai Namco Entertainment | |
| The Dark Pictures Anthology: House of Ashes | PlayStation 4 PlayStation 5 Windows; Xbox One; Xbox Series X/S | 22 October 2021 | Bandai Namco Entertainment | |
| The Quarry | PlayStation 4 PlayStation 5 Windows; Xbox One; Xbox Series X/S | 10 June 2022 | 2K | |
| The Dark Pictures Anthology: The Devil in Me | PlayStation 4 PlayStation 5 Windows; Xbox One; Xbox Series X/S | 18 November 2022 | Bandai Namco Entertainment | |
| The Dark Pictures: Switchback VR | PlayStation 5 (PlayStation VR2) | 16 March 2023 | Supermassive Games | |
| The Casting of Frank Stone | PlayStation 5 Windows; Xbox Series X/S | 3 September 2024 | Behaviour Interactive | |
| Little Nightmares III | Nintendo Switch; Nintendo Switch 2 PlayStation 4 PlayStation 5 Windows; Xbox One; Xbox Series X/S | 10 October 2025 | Bandai Namco Entertainment | |
| Directive 8020 | PlayStation 5 Windows; Xbox Series X/S | 12 May 2026 | Supermassive Games | |
| The Conjuring: Unspoken | Netflix | 13 October 2026 | Supermassive Games | |
