= Until Dawn =

2015 video game

- Developer: Supermassive Games (Note: Remake version developed by Ballistic Moon)
- Publisher: Sony Computer Entertainment (Note: Remake released under the publisher's new name Sony Interactive Entertainment)
- Director: Will Byles
- Producer: Pete Samuels
- Designers: Tom Heaton; Nik Bowen
- Writers: Larry Fessenden; Graham Reznick
- Composer: Jason Graves (Note: Mark Korven composed the remake's score.)
- Engine: Decima (Note: Unreal Engine 5 was used for the remake.)
- Platforms: PlayStation 4; PlayStation 5; Windows
- Release: PlayStation 4: NA: 25 August 2015; PAL: 26 August 2015; UK: 28 August 2015; PlayStation 5, Windows: WW: 4 October 2024
- Genres: Survival horror Interactive drama
- Mode: Single-player

Until Dawn is a 2015 interactive drama survival horror game developed by Supermassive Games and published by Sony Computer Entertainment. Players assume control of eight young adults who have to survive on Blackwood Mountain when their lives are threatened. The game features a butterfly effect system in which players must make choices that may change the story. All major playable characters can survive or die, depending on the choices made. Players explore the environment from a third-person perspective and find clues that may help solve the mystery.

Until Dawn was originally planned as a first-person game for the PlayStation 3's motion controller PlayStation Move. The motion controls were dropped when it became a PlayStation 4 game. The script was written by Larry Fessenden and Graham Reznick, who sought to create the video game equivalent of a slasher film. The development team took inspiration from various sources. These include the movies Evil Dead II and Poltergeist, and video games Heavy Rain, Resident Evil, and Silent Hill. To ensure the game was scary, the team used a galvanic skin response test to measure playtesters' fear levels when playing it. Jason Graves composed the soundtrack and Guerrilla Games' Decima game engine was used for the graphics. Several noted actors, including Rami Malek, Hayden Panettiere, Meaghan Martin, Brett Dalton, Jordan Fisher, Nichole Sakura, and Peter Stormare provided motion capture and voice acting.

Until Dawn was announced at Gamescom 2012 and released for the PlayStation 4 in August 2015. Although there was little marketing effort from Sony, its sales surpassed expectations. The game received generally positive reviews from critics, and was nominated for multiple year-end accolades. Critics praised the branching nature of the story, butterfly effect system, world building, characters, and use of quick time events, but criticised the controls. Supermassive followed the game with a virtual reality spin-off, Until Dawn: Rush of Blood (2016), and a prequel, The Inpatient (2018), while a spiritual successor, The Quarry, was released in 2022. A remake for PlayStation 5 and Windows was released on 4 October 2024. A film adaptation of the game was released in April 2025. A sequel, Until Dawn 2, is scheduled for release in January 2027.

== Gameplay ==
In Until Dawn, players have to make quick decisions that may have unforeseen consequences.

Until Dawn is a survival horror interactive drama in which players primarily assume control of eight young adults who have to survive on Blackwood Mountain until they are rescued at dawn. The gameplay is mainly a combination of cutscenes and third-person exploration. Players control the characters in a linear environment and find clues and items. Players can also collect totems, which give players a precognition of what may happen in the game's narrative. An in-game system keeps track of all of the story clues and secrets that players have discovered, even across multiple playthroughs. Action sequences feature mostly quick time events (QTE). One type of QTE involves hiding from a threat by holding the controller as still as possible when a "Don't Move" prompt appears.

The game features a butterfly effect system, in which players have to make choices. These range from small decisions like picking up a book to moral choices that involve the fates of other characters. Some decisions are timed. Certain choices may unlock a new sequence of events and cause unforeseen consequences. These choices also influence the story's tone and relationships between characters. Players can view the personality and details of the character they are controlling, and his or her relationships with other characters. All eight characters may die by the end of the story, depending on the player's decisions. Deaths are permanent; the game's narrative will adapt to these changes and continue forward without them. The strict auto-save system prevents players from reloading a previously saved file to prevent cheating. This makes it impossible to revert choices with unfavorable outcomes. The only ways to change the player's choice are to restart the game or to continue to the end and start a new game. There are hundreds of endings, which are the outcomes of 22 critical choices players can make in the game.

The game is divided into 10 chapters, with an intermission between each chapter in which psychiatrist Dr. Alan Hill addresses the player directly (seemingly breaking the fourth wall) to analyse the player's fears along with choices they have made.

== Plot ==
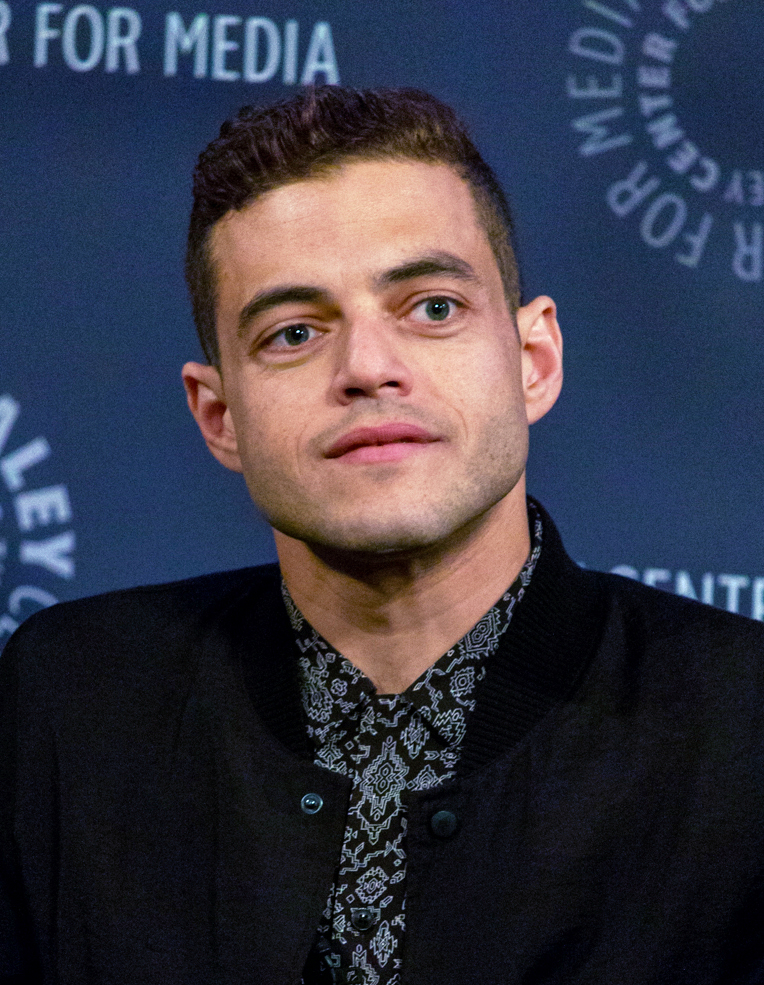
Rami Malek portrayed Josh Washington.

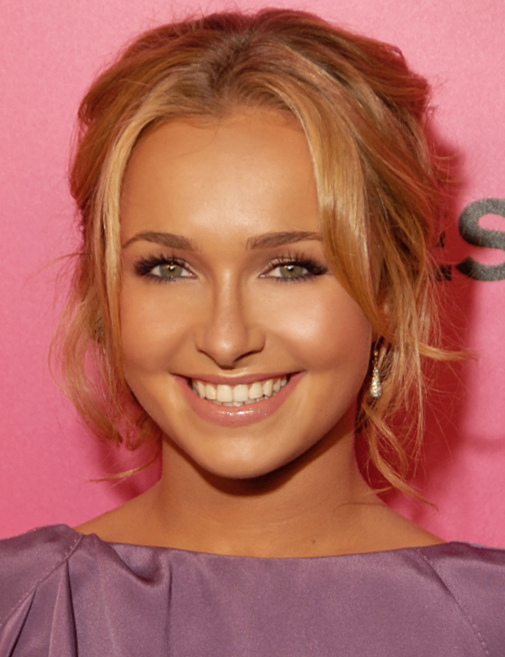
Hayden Panettiere portrayed Sam Giddings.

During a celebration party at her family's lodge on Blackwood Mountain, a cruel prank causes Hannah Washington (Ella Lentini) to flee into the woods. Hannah's twin sister Beth (also Lentini) finds her, but the two are pursued by a flamethrower-wielding stranger (Larry Fessenden), resulting in them falling off a cliff. Despite a search, their bodies are never found and they are declared missing.

A year later, Hannah and Beth's brother Josh (Rami Malek) invites the group from the previous party—Hannah's friend Sam Giddings (Hayden Panettiere), Josh's friend Chris Hartley (Noah Fleiss), Chris' crush Ashley Brown (Galadriel Stineman), couple Emily Davis (Nichole Sakura) and Matt Taylor (Jordan Fisher), Emily's ex-boyfriend Mike Munroe (Brett Dalton), and Mike's new girlfriend Jessica Riley (Meaghan Martin)—back to the lodge. Despite tensions between members of the group and reservations about returning after the previous year's events, all seven accept Josh's invitation. Each member of the group arrives at the lodge via cable car before engaging in separate activities on the mountain.

As the night progresses, Mike and Jessica tryst at a guest cabin, where Jessica is abducted by an unseen figure. Mike pursues her captor to an abandoned sanatorium, where he uncovers documents detailing a 1952 cave-in that trapped a group of miners. Mike finds Jessica either dead or alive, but the elevator she is in plummets, leading him to believe she has died. Meanwhile, Josh, Ashley, Chris, and Sam find themselves terrorized by a masked man in the lodge. Josh is seemingly killed after being bisected in a torture device set up by the masked man, who then pursues Sam through the lodge's lower levels. The man later orders Chris to shoot Ashley or himself under the threat of both of them being killed by large saw blades. Matt and Emily, having been alerted to the masked man's attack, discover that the cable car has been locked; instead, the two head to a radio tower to request help. Although their signal is received, they are informed that no rescue can occur until dawn due to a storm. An unknown creature causes the radio tower to collapse into the mines, separating Matt and Emily. Emily stumbles across the site where Hannah and Beth fell the previous year, and, to her horror, finds Beth's severed head nearby. She is later chased by the creature out of the mines.

Mike reunites with Sam just as the masked man reappears and reveals himself to be Josh, who orchestrated the events at the lodge as a revenge prank for his sisters' presumed deaths. Josh denies any involvement in Jessica's death, but Mike restrains him in a shed to await the police. Later, Sam, Mike, Chris, Ashley, and—if she survived her escape from the mines—Emily are confronted at the lodge by the Stranger. The Stranger reveals the creatures that abducted Jessica and attacked Matt and Emily are wendigos, former humans who became feral after resorting to cannibalism during the 1952 cave-in. Chris and the Stranger head to the shed to retrieve Josh but find him missing. On the way back, the Stranger, and potentially Chris, are killed by a wendigo. While perusing the Stranger's research, Emily—if she was bitten during her escape—reveals the injury; Mike may shoot her out of fear of infection. Believing Josh holds the key to the cable car, Mike heads to the sanatorium to retrieve it. The others follow, though Ashley and Chris may fall victim to a wendigo attack along the way.

Sam and Mike find Josh in the mines, whose deteriorating mental state causes him to hallucinate his sisters and his psychiatrist, Dr. Alan Hill (Peter Stormare). Mike attempts to guide him to safety, but they are separated when a wendigo attacks Josh. He is killed unless Sam has uncovered enough clues to reveal the truth: the lead wendigo is Hannah, who survived her fall but transformed after consuming Beth's remains. If Jessica and/or Matt have survived, they regroup and attempt to escape the mines while evading Hannah. Mike and Sam return to the lodge and join the remaining survivors in the basement, but find it overrun by wendigos, including Hannah. When a fight between the wendigos causes a gas leak, Mike and Sam work together to ignite an explosion that destroys the lodge, killing Hannah, the other wendigos, and possibly some of the group. Following the explosion, rescue helicopters arrive to retrieve whoever has survived until dawn.

In the ending credits, any surviving characters, excluding Josh, are interviewed by the police about the events on the mountain; at least one survivor will urge the police to search the mines. If Josh survives Hannah's attack, the police later discover him eating the Stranger's head and transforming into a wendigo.

== Development and release ==
=== As a PlayStation Move game ===
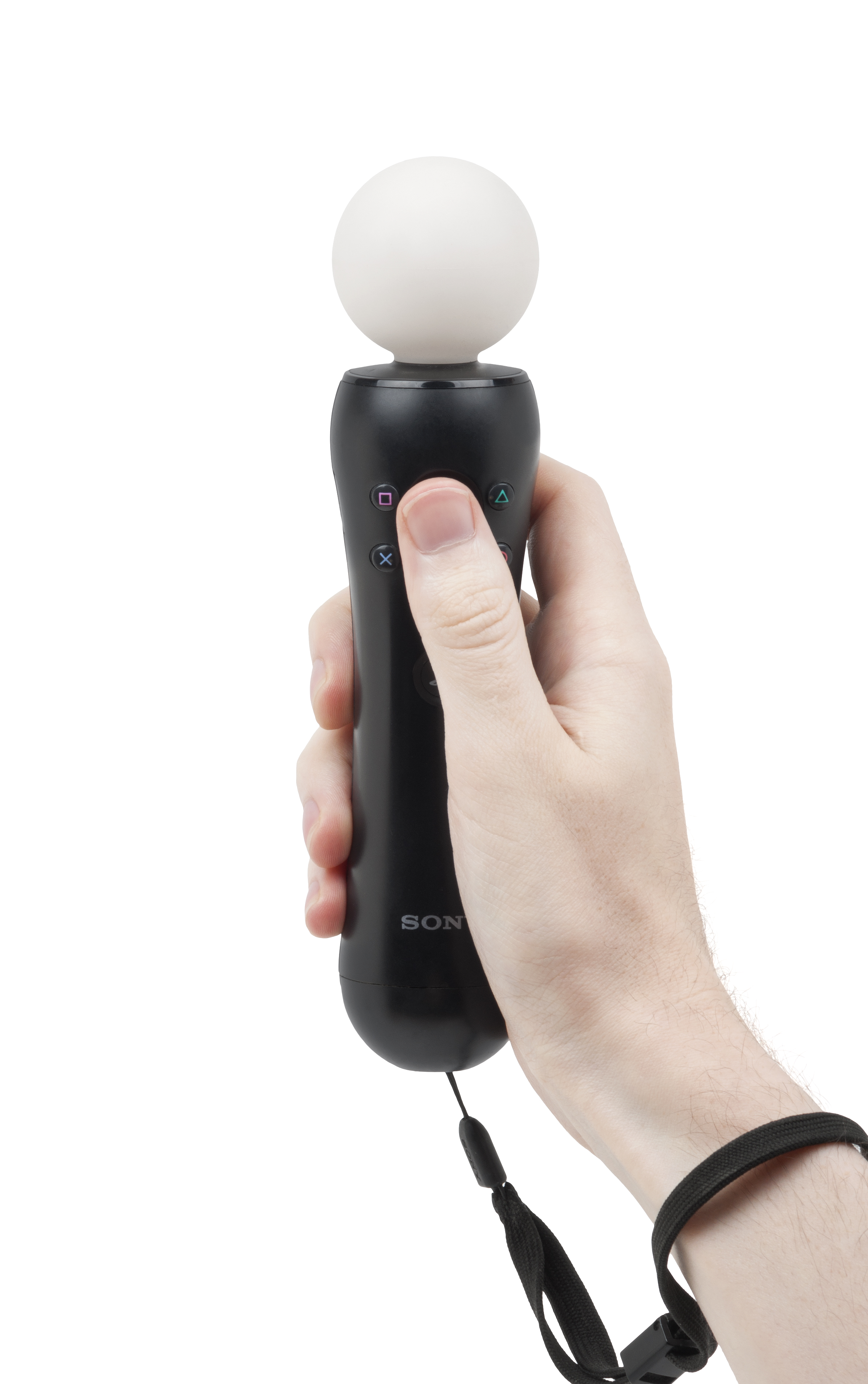
The game was initially designed for the PlayStation Move motion controller for the PlayStation 3.

British developer Supermassive Games served as the game's developer. Its existence was revealed after a trademark for Until Dawn was discovered. The studio began discussing an idea for a new game for the PlayStation 3's PlayStation Move accessory, which had a greater emphasis on narrative than Supermassive's previous games, such as Start the Party!. The proposed game would be a horror game that resembled a slasher film and it would be designed for a younger audience that publisher Sony Computer Entertainment had courted with the Move. Supermassive hired American writers Larry Fessenden and Graham Reznick, both of whom had worked on horror movies, to write the game's script. They were hired because the team felt the company's British writers wrote in a "parochial" way that is inappropriate for the horror genre. In 2024, it was revealed that London Studio worked on the title from 2008 to 2010 until Supermassive took over the game's development.

The game was initially exclusive to PlayStation Move, meaning players needed to buy the Move controller to functionally play the game. In this version of the game, the only way to navigate and progress the game is by moving the motion controller. Moving the wand guides the movement of the flashlight held by the characters as players explore the location from a first-person perspective. The wand can also be used to interact with objects and solve puzzles. In this version of the game, players can occasionally wield a firearm. An early version of the game also supported two-player cooperative multiplayer, with the studio targeting young couples in their twenties. A segment of the game shown at Gamescom 2012 received positive comments from the gaming community, but one of the most common complaints received was the game's status as a Move exclusive; most people did not want to purchase a controller for the game. At that time, the game had reached the alpha development stage. Byles experimented with the game's debug camera and realized the potential of changing the perspective to third-person. This would change the game from a first-person adventure game to a more "cinematic" experience. The game also switched platform from PlayStation 3 to the PlayStation 4 and expanded the game's scope to include more mature content, targeting an older demographic. Most characters were also recast; Brett Dalton, one of the actors retained from the PlayStation 3 version, said he believed that the recasting was performed to hire better-known actors.

With these changes, the team partnered with Cubic Motion and 3Lateral to motion capture the actors' performances. The team also needed to change the game's graphics. They used the Decima engine created by Guerrilla Games and had to rework the lighting system. The team also extensively used particle effects and volumetric lighting to light up the game's environments. Despite the third-person perspective, the game adopted a static camera angle in a way similar to early Resident Evil games. The approach was initially resisted by the development team because the designers considered the camera "archaic". Byles and the game's production designer Lee Robinson, however, drew storyboards to ensure each camera angle had narrative motivations and prove their placements were not random. Initially, quality assurance testers were frustrated with the camera angle; Supermassive resolved this complaint by ensuring drastic camera transitions would not occur at thresholds like doors but the team had to remove some scenes to satisfy this design philosophy.

=== Gameplay and story ===
Supermassive had to overhaul the gameplay completely after the Move exclusivity requirement was dropped, because the core gameplay mechanic of pointing flashlights to different directions failed to be engaging without motion control. Inspired by games like Quantic Dream's Heavy Rain, the team turned Until Dawn into an interactive movie. To increase the player's agency, the team envisioned a system named the "butterfly effect". Every choice the player makes in the game helps shape the story and ultimately leads to different endings. Byles stated that "all of [the characters] can live or all of whom can die in any order in any number of ways", and that this leads to many ways for scenes to unfold. He further added that no two players would get the same experience because certain scenes would be locked away should the player make a different choice. Byles said this would encourage players to replay the game to discover more about the story. Supermassive developed a software that enabled the team to keep track of the story they intended to tell. Due to the branching nature of the game, every time the team wanted to change details in the narrative, the writers needed to examine the possible impacts the change would have on subsequent events. The team avoided substantial rewrites and instead focused on adjusting the game's pacing and direction once the motion capture and shooting process had begun. According to Byles, a subplot that was removed during development involved one of the female characters being pregnant, which got cut for "prov[ing] too distracting from the main story line".

The game's strict auto-save system was designed to be "imperative" instead of "punitive". Byles said even though a character had died, the story would not end until it reached the ending and that some characters may not have died despite their deaths being hinted at. Some plot points were designed to be indirect and vague so the narrative would gradually unfold. Byles recognized the design choice as "risky" and that it may disappoint mainstream players but he felt it enhanced the game's "horror" elements. The game's pacing was inspired by that of Resident Evil and Silent Hill, in which there were quiet moments with no enemy encounter that help enhance the games' tension. Tom Heaton, the game's designer, said an unsuccessful QTE trial or one incorrect choice would not lead directly to a character's death, though it would send the characters to "harder, more treacherous paths".

Byles described the game as "glib" and "cheesy", and said the story and the atmosphere were similar to a typical teen horror movie. The film was inspired by a number of classic movies; the developers observed horror tropes and clichés that can be subverted in the game. These films included Psycho, The Haunting, The Exorcist, Halloween, Poltergeist, Evil Dead II, and The Conjuring. Fessenden and Reznick wrote a script of nearly 10,000 pages. The playable characters were set up as typical horror movie archetypes but as the narrative unfolded, these characters would show more nuanced qualities. The writers felt that, unlike films, games can use quieter moments for characters to express their inner feelings. With the game's emphasis on players' choices, players can no longer "laugh" at the characters' decisions because they must make these decisions themselves. It enables the player to relate with the characters and make each death more devastating. The dialogue was reduced significantly when the team began to use the motion capture technology, which facilitates storytelling through acting. The story was written in a non-linear fashion; chapter 8 was the first to be completed. This ended up causing some inconsistencies in the story.

The development team wanted to invoke fear in the player and ensure the game had the appropriate proportion of terror, horror, and disgust. Supermassive made most use of terror, which Byles defined as "the dread of an unseen threat". To ensure the game was scary enough, the team used a galvanic skin response test to measure playtesters' fear levels while they were playing the game. Byles described Until Dawn as a game that took "horror back to the roots of horror"; unlike many of its competitors, tension rather than action was emphasized.

=== Music ===
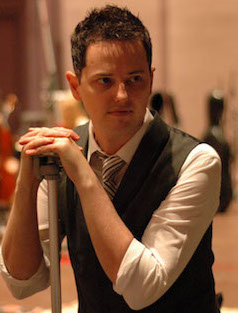
Jason Graves is the composer for the game.

Jason Graves began working on Until Dawn's music in 2011. The scoring process for three orchestra recording sessions lasted for one year. Graves talked with Barney Pratt, the game's audio director, for three hours to get a clear idea about the direction of the soundtrack. He first composed the game's main theme, which he felt represented what the team was trying to achieve, and used it as the demo pitch to Supermassive Games. The music was reactive; it would become louder as the player character approached a threat. While composing for the game, he mixed both melodic and atonal sounds together. The music was influenced by the work of Krzysztof Penderecki and Jerry Goldsmith. There were tonally vague themes to mirror the game's mysterious storyline.

With the butterfly effect being an important mechanic of the game, Graves used film music editing techniques. He divided each track into segments and had the orchestra play it piece by piece. He then manipulated the recordings and introduced variations of them in the recording studio. For the game's mountainous setting, he used a "goat-hoof shaker" to perform the mountain theme and many of the key tracks. He also extensively used synthesizers to pay homage to John Carpenter's work. Only 30 minutes of themes with melody and chord progression were recorded in three orchestral sessions. This was because most of the time was spent recording 8–10 hours' worth of atmospheric music and sounds that Graves later combined to invoke different emotions in different scenes. The Decima game engine was programmed to determine how the music was layered depending on players' choices in the game. The game's soundtracks were nearly 15 hours long. The theme song, "O Death", was performed by Amy Van Roekel.

== Release and marketing ==
Until Dawn was officially announced at Gamescom 2012 and it was initially scheduled to be released in 2013 for PlayStation 3. After the game was retooled, it was rumored Sony had canceled it but Supermassive CEO Pete Samuels refuted the claim. The game was re-revealed at Gamescom 2014. Sony did not market Until Dawn extensively; most of its marketing effort was spent on promoting third-party games such as Destiny. On 31 July 2015, Sony confirmed the game had gone gold, indicating the team had completed development and it was being prepared for duplication and release. It was released for the PlayStation 4 in August 2015, two years after its initial proposed launch. Players who pre-ordered the game received a bonus mission featuring Matt and Emily. As well as the game's standard edition, an extended edition and a steelbook edition were available for purchase. The game's death scenes were censored in the Japanese version. Supermassive hosted a time-limited Halloween event in late October 2015, in which 11 pumpkins were added to the game as collectibles.

=== Remake ===
A remake for the game was announced in January 2024 and released for PlayStation 5 and Windows on October 4, 2024. It was developed by Ballistic Moon, whose founders previously worked at Supermassive and contributed to the development of the original game. Powered by Unreal Engine 5, the remake includes various graphical improvements and new musical scores composed by Mark Korven, and introduces a new, third-person, over-the-shoulder game camera, and a new type of totems named Hunger Totems. While the story remained largely the same, the remake also adds new interactions between characters, an extended prologue, and new endings. It also remixes the locations of the totems in the original game. The "Don't Move" gameplay mechanic, which originally required players to keep their PlayStation controller as still as possible to influence the outcome of specific scenarios, was reworked for non-PlayStation platforms. In addition, a new mechanic, "Stay Calm", was introduced for third-party peripherals that lack gyroscope functionality, ensuring players can still experience similar gameplay tension without the need for motion controls.

== Reception ==
=== Critical response ===
Reception

Aggregate score
Aggregator	Score
Metacritic	79/100

Review scores
Publication	Score
Destructoid	7/10
Electronic Gaming Monthly	8/10
Game Informer	9/10
GameRevolution	4/5
GameSpot	8/10
GamesRadar+	3.5/5
IGN	7.5/10
Polygon	6.5/10
VentureBeat	90/100

Until Dawn received "generally favorable" reviews from critics, according to review aggregator website Metacritic. Jeff Marchiafava from Game Informer wrote that Supermassive Games had "polished the [adventure game] formula to a triple-A sheen". He also enjoyed the butterfly effect system because some choices significantly affect the game's narrative. Game Revolution's Jessica Vazquez described the system as a "welcome limitation" because players would not know the consequences of each choice until they reach the ending. Alexa Ray Corriea from GameSpot liked the game for its impactful choices and the "paranoia" it invokes during critical choices that risk the lives of certain characters. She also admired the system's complexity and intricacy, which lets the player replay the game to discover new scenes. Mollie L Patterson from Electronic Gaming Monthly thought that the system is a "fantastic" inclusion but it never reached its full potential. Chris Carter from Destructoid called the butterfly effect system "gimmicky" due to the choices not significantly influencing the plot. GamesRadar's Louise Blain opined that most choices players make in the first half of the game are meaningless, though she noted that this is less of a problem in the latter half. Polygon's Phillip Kollar respected Supermassive's decision to not include manual saving, though he found the decision to be punitive because accidentally failing a QTE can result in a character's death.

Carter liked the game's world-building, which he said is extensive and intriguing. He also praised the cast's performances—singling out Peter Stormare's performance as therapist Dr. Hill—and the intermission sessions that became increasingly disturbing as the game progressed. Ray Corriea also enjoyed the cast's performances along with Graves' soundtracks, which she said elevate the game's "panic, terror, and anguish". On a less positive note, Kollar wrote that the acting is hampered by inadequacies in the game's motion capture technology. Marchiafava enjoyed the "compelling" story; he applauded the developers for successfully using different horror tropes while introducing several twists to the formula. Both Marchiafava and Dean Takahashi from Venturebeat liked the characters, who show genuine growth as the narrative unfolds. Correa added that players can relate to these characters. Both Blain and Patterson called the game a "love letter" to horror films, with Patterson noting the game's similarities to a "B-grade teen slasher flick". Andrew Webster from The Verge agreed, saying the game combines elements of both horror films and games, and transforms them into a "terrifying experience". He further added that the control the player has over the events makes Until Dawn "something special". Lucy O'Brien from IGN, however, said the game's strict adherence to genre tropes dilutes the game's scary moments and that it "revels in the slasher genre's idiosyncratic idiocy". She also criticized the game's inconsistent tone. Kollar disliked the game's writing and he criticized the "awkward cuts, long moments of unintentionally hilarious silence and hopping between scenes and perspectives with no regard for holding the player's interest".

Carter called the gameplay of Until Dawn unimaginative, though critics generally agreed the quick time events are well-handled because they help players become immersed in the game; Ray Corriea chose the "Don't Move" prompt as one of the player inputs that further heighten the tension. Marchiafava called its use one of the best in gaming because button prompts were often timed and successful attempts required precision. Patterson described the gameplay as conventional; he enjoyed the inclusion of QTEs and said they match with the game's overall theme and atmosphere. He noted, however, the game's cumbersome controls and suggested the shortcoming may originate from the game's origin as a PlayStation Move exclusive. Ray Corriea was disappointed by the game's linearity and the lack of interactions players can have with the environments, which she said had wasted the game's setting. Blain praised the game's quieter moments, in which the player character simply walks and explores the environment, and the fixed camera angles that contribute to tense and frightening moments. Takahashi found the 3D navigation awkward. O'Brien lamented the game's poorly-implemented motion control; she also disliked the QTEs, which she considered as tedious at times. Level design and location diversity were commonly praised by critics. The collectibles were regarded as meaningful additions to the game because they give players insights into possible future events in the game.

=== Remake ===
Reception of the remake

Aggregate score
Aggregator	Score
Metacritic	(PS5) 70/100 (PC) 72/100

Review scores
Publication	Score
HobbyConsolas	79/100
IGN	5/10
MeriStation	7.2/10
PC Gamer (US)	75/100
Push Square	6/10
The Games Machine (Italy)	6.1/10
VG247	4/5

Critical response to the remake was "mixed or average", according to Metacritic. Critics appreciated the graphical upgrades and additional scenes, but questioned the price tag and performance issues. (Note: Multiple references:) Push Square's Sammy Barker found the remake's enhancements appealing but criticized the lack of incentives for existing owners and its inconsistent performance compared to the original. Borja Ruete of MeriStation praised its gameplay tweaks, while Rebecca Jones from VG247 and Tristan Ogilvie of IGN felt the new gameplay features were lacking. In line with criticism of the limited new content, Ogilvie mentioned a new totem minigame, which he did not welcome. Jones and Rolling Stone's Aimee Hart were positive about the enhanced accessibility features. Writing for HobbyConsolas and praising the new ending and the extras, Alberto Lloret thought the level of detail in characters and environments was one of the best aspects of the remake. He cited the rough gameplay, length and visual glitches as the worst aspects.

Critics praised the game's story, characters, performances, and horror elements. The Games Machine's Marco Ravetto noted that the remake retained the strong narrative structure and engaging character arcs of the original game and admired the improved graphical quality, but decried the minor narrative additions, new camera system and lack of significant new features or multiplayer options. Oglivie and Shacknews editor Will Borger opined that the new third-person camera made the game less "cinematic" when compared with the original experience. Borger stated that the remake continued to preserve the original's engaging story and strong performances, but went on to criticize the removal of faster walking and clunkier controls, calling it "an unnecessary, technically abysmal remake". A Vice article by Dwayne Jenkins also criticized the remake for being unnecessary, poorly performing on PC, and not justifying its high cost without substantial new content, while acknowledging the game's strong narrative and characters. Alexander Chatziioannou from PC Gamer, like other critics, said that the remake's technical issues and new content didn't justify the price, but the game had a good balance of humor and horror that, together with an engaging narrative and well-written characters, made for an enjoyable experience and was still "the perfect interactive horror movie".

Ruete and Lloret remarked on the exaggerated facial animations and Jones described the character movements as awkward. Ogilvie saw the movements as sluggish.

=== Sales ===
According to Chart-Track, Until Dawn was the second best-selling retail game in the United Kingdom in its week of release, trailing Gears of War: Ultimate Edition. The game was also the seventh-best-selling game in the US and the top-trending game on YouTube in August 2015. Sony was surprised by the game's critical responses and the number of players posting videos of it or streaming it on YouTube. Shuhei Yoshida, President of SCE Worldwide Studios, called Until Dawn a "sleeper hit". Samuels added that the game surpassed the company's expectations, though the exact sales figure was not announced.

The remake was the 14th best-selling game in the UK in its week of release. At launch, the game had a peak concurrent player count of 2,607 on Steam, becoming one of Sony's slowest-selling games on the platform alongside Concord and Sackboy: A Big Adventure.

=== Accolades ===
Date	Ceremony	Category	Recipients	Result	Ref.
2015	33rd Golden Joystick Awards	PlayStation Game of the Year	Until Dawn	Nominated	
2015	The Game Awards 2015	Best Narrative	Until Dawn	Nominated	
2016			Until Dawn		
2016	2016 SXSW Gaming Awards	Excellence in Technical Achievement	Until Dawn	Nominated	
2016	National Academy of Video Game Trade Reviewers	Performance in a Drama Supporting	Brett Dalton as Mike	Nominated	
2016	National Academy of Video Game Trade Reviewers	Use of Sound, New IP	Until Dawn	Nominated	
2016	12th British Academy Games Awards	British Game	Until Dawn	Nominated	
2016	12th British Academy Games Awards	Game Innovation	Until Dawn	Nominated	
2016	12th British Academy Games Awards	Original Property	Until Dawn	Won	
2016	12th British Academy Games Awards	Story	Until Dawn	Nominated	
2025	23rd Visual Effects Society Awards	Outstanding Visual Effects in a Real-Time Project	Nicholas Chambers, Jack Hidde Glavimans, Alex Gabor	Nominated	

== Legacy ==
Sony announced a non-canonical spin-off, Until Dawn: Rush of Blood, at Paris Games Week 2015. The company described it as an arcade shooter. Its development began halfway through Until Dawn's development. Until Dawn: Rush of Blood was released on the PlayStation VR on 13 October 2016. In June 2017, a prequel to Until Dawn, The Inpatient, was announced. It is set in the Blackwood Sanatorium sixty years before the original. In June 2022, The Quarry, a spiritual successor also developed by Supermassive Games, was released.

In January 2024, Sony announced a film adaptation to the game directed by David F. Sandberg with Gary Dauberman doing a pass on a script originally written by Blair Butler. The film was to be produced by Screen Gems and PlayStation Productions. In June 2024, Ella Rubin, Michael Cimino, Ji-young Yoo, and Odessa A'zion joined the cast in undisclosed roles. In July 2024, Maia Mitchell and Belmont Cameli joined the cast in undisclosed roles, with Peter Stormare joining the cast to reprise his role as Dr. Alan J. Hill. Filming started on 5 August 2024. In October 2024, its release date was set for April 25, 2025. The film reinterprets the concept of Until Dawn as a time-loop horror scenario, wherein five protagonists must evade various threats until morning. Death triggers a reset mechanism tied to an ominous hourglass, and repeated failure results in transformation into a wendigo as part of Dr. Hill's experiment. While the central theme of a missing sibling remains, the setting and consequence-driven gameplay elements are largely altered. Audience response to the film was mixed "as a result of its own choices, alongside middling reviews" from critics.

A sequel, Until Dawn 2, is set to be released on January 28, 2027. It is developed by Firesprite, a first-party Sony studio, with assisted work by AdHoc Studio.
