= Until Dawn 2 =

Upcoming video game

- Developer: Firesprite (Note: Additional work by AdHoc Studio)
- Publisher: Sony Interactive Entertainment
- Series: Until Dawn
- Platform: PlayStation 5
- Release: 28 January 2027
- Genres: Adventure, horror
- Mode: Single-player

Until Dawn 2 is an upcoming horror adventure game co-developed by Firesprite and AdHoc Studio and published by Sony Interactive Entertainment. It is a standalone sequel to Until Dawn (2015), and is scheduled to be released for PlayStation 5 on 28 January 2027. The game follows Dead True, a group of ghost hunters whose staged paranormal content becomes a fight for survival after they travel to an abandoned tropical island.

== Gameplay ==
Until Dawn 2 is a narrative-driven horror game built around player choice and branching consequences. As in the original Until Dawn, player decisions influence which characters survive and how the story progresses. Firesprite stated that the sequel uses the Butterfly Effect system, with story branches affected by major decisions, smaller character interactions, and the state of relationships within the group. The reveal trailer promoted the returning series premise that every main character can either live or die based on the player's actions.

== Premise ==
The game features a new cast and setting rather than directly continuing the Blackwood Mountain storyline of the first game. Its central characters are the crew of Dead True, a popular paranormal channel whose members stage fake supernatural investigations before encountering real horrors. After signing a deal with a television network, the group travels to an abandoned tropical island for its first professionally funded episode. The assignment exposes the crew to real threats connected to the island's history, while tensions within the group affect their chances of survival.

== Development and release ==
Until Dawn 2 is being developed by Firesprite, a Liverpool-based first-party Sony studio, and AdHoc Studio, rather than Supermassive Games, the developer of the first game. It will be Firesprite's first release since Horizon Call of the Mountain, which it co-developed with Guerrilla Games. Dacre Montgomery said that he joined the project in 2022, indicating that development had been underway for several years before its announcement.

The game was announced during Sony's State of Play presentation in June 2026. Although the sequel features a new cast, Peter Stormare was confirmed to reprise his role as Dr. Alan J. Hill from the first Until Dawn and the 2025 film adaptation. Neil Newbon and Montgomery were identified among the actors appearing in the announcement materials. Montgomery, Gavin Leatherwood, and Tanner Buchanan were also identified as cast members whose likenesses would be used for in-game character designs. In September 2026, it was confirmed that AdHoc Studio is co-developing the game's story.

The game is scheduled to be released for PlayStation 5 on 28 January 2027.
