= PlayStation Productions =

American video game production company

PlayStation Productions, LLC
- Type: Subsidiary
- Industry: Entertainment
- Predecessors: PlayStation Originals
- Founded: 2019; 7 years ago
- Headquarters: Culver City, California, U.S.
- Area served: Worldwide
- Key people: Asad Qizilbash (president)
- Products: Films and television series based on video games
- Services: Film production; Television production
- Parent: Sony Interactive Entertainment
- Website: www.playstation.com/playstation-productions

PlayStation Productions, LLC is an American film and television production company owned by Sony Interactive Entertainment (SIE). The company adapts SIE's video game franchises into films and television shows with the distribution mainly being handled by Sony's film and television divisions. Its adaptations so far include the films Uncharted (2022), Gran Turismo (2023), Until Dawn (2025), and Resident Evil (2026) and television series The Last of Us (2023–present) and Twisted Metal (2023–present).

== History ==
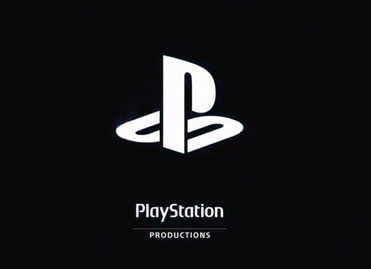
PlayStation Productions' on-screen logo, which debuted with Uncharted

Two PlayStation adaptations were released under the now-defunct former production label PlayStation Originals prior to the creation of PlayStation Productions: Heavenly Sword, which was released in 2014, and Ratchet & Clank, which was released by Gramercy Pictures in 2016 to largely unfavorable reviews from critics.

The PlayStation Network began to produce and distribute their own original content around the spring of 2015. The first original scripted program, Powers, aired on March 10, 2015, and ran for two complete seasons. The series was discontinued on August 3, 2016. Until 2020, no more attempts would be made to adapt PlayStation intellectual properties.

Sony Interactive Entertainment launched PlayStation Productions in 2019 with a focus on adapting the company's video game franchises into films and television shows. An emphasis was placed on coordination between the film and television departments at Sony Pictures with the video game development studios at SIE Worldwide Studios. In December 2020, Tony Vinciquerra, Chairman and CEO of Sony Pictures, revealed that Sony was working on three movies and seven TV shows based on PlayStation video game content.

=== Film ===
Uncharted, based on the action-adventure video game series by Naughty Dog, was the first film produced by PlayStation Productions. It was theatrically released on February 18, 2022. A sequel is in development. Gran Turismo, based on the racing simulation video game series by Polyphony Digital, received a limited theatrical release on August 11, 2023, before expanding on August 25, 2023. Until Dawn, a feature film adaptation of the horror game by Supermassive Games, was released on April 25, 2025. PlayStation Productions was a partner studio on Resident Evil, which was theatrically released on September 18, 2026 and acts as a reboot of the Resident Evil film series based on the franchise of the same name by Capcom, making it the first project from the studio adapting a video game property not owned by SIE.

=== Television and streaming ===
The first television series from PlayStation Productions was an adaptation of Naughty Dog's The Last of Us, which premiered on HBO on January 15, 2023; a second season premiered on April 13, 2025. The series was renewed for a third season on April 9, 2025, ahead of its second season premiere. Twisted Metal, a television adaptation of the vehicular combat franchise, was released on Peacock on July 27, 2023; a second season was released on July 31, 2025. The series was renewed for a third season on November 18, 2025. A live-action television series based on Santa Monica Studio's God of War franchise for Amazon Prime Video is in production.

=== Future projects ===
In February 2022, Uncharted director Ruben Fleischer expressed a desire to collaborate with Naughty Dog on a Jak and Daxter film. Feature film adaptations of the Sucker Punch Productions video game Ghost of Tsushima, Bend Studio's Days Gone, Japan Studio's Gravity Rush and Arrowhead Game Studios' Helldivers are currently in the works. A feature film adaptation of Guerrilla Games' Horizon series is also in the works, after previously being developed as a TV adaptation for Netflix before it was cancelled. An adaptation of Astro Bot for either film or television is under active consideration by Sony, with PlayStation Productions chief Asad Qizilbash confirming they are "absolutely" exploring the possibility. In April 2026, Sony officially announced that an animated Bloodborne film was in the works.

== Work ==
=== Films ===
==== Released ====
Film	U.S. release date	Based on	Director	Co-production with	Distribution
Uncharted	February 18, 2022	Uncharted by Naughty Dog	Ruben Fleischer	Columbia Pictures; Atlas Entertainment; A2 Productions	Sony Pictures Releasing
Gran Turismo	August 25, 2023	Gran Turismo by Polyphony Digital	Neill Blomkamp	Columbia Pictures; 2.0 Entertainment	Sony Pictures Releasing
Until Dawn	April 25, 2025	Until Dawn by Supermassive Games	David F. Sandberg	Screen Gems; Vertigo Entertainment; Coin Operated; Mangata	Sony Pictures Releasing
Resident Evil	September 18, 2026	Resident Evil by Capcom	Zach Cregger	Columbia Pictures; Constantin Film; Davis Films; Subconscious; Vertigo Entertainment	Sony Pictures Releasing

==== Upcoming/in development ====
Film	U.S. release date	Based on	Co-production with	Distribution
Horizon Zero Dawn	2027	Horizon Zero Dawn by Guerrilla Games	Columbia Pictures	Sony Pictures Releasing
Helldivers	June 9, 2028	Helldivers by Arrowhead Game Studios	Columbia Pictures; Perfect Storm Entertainment	Sony Pictures Releasing
Days Gone	TBA	Days Gone by Bend Studio	Vendetta Productions	TBA
Bloodborne	TBA	Bloodborne by FromSoftware and Japan Studio	Columbia Pictures; Lyrical Animation	Sony Pictures Releasing
Ghost of Tsushima	TBA	Ghost of Tsushima by Sucker Punch Productions	Columbia Pictures; 87North Productions; Sucker Punch Productions	Sony Pictures Releasing
Gravity Rush	TBA	Gravity Rush by Japan Studio	Scott Free Productions	TBA
Untitled Uncharted sequel	TBA	Uncharted by Naughty Dog	Columbia Pictures; Atlas Entertainment; A2 Productions	Sony Pictures Releasing

=== Television series ===
==== Released ====
Series	Season(s)	U.S. release date		Based on	Showrunner(s)	Co-production with	Network/platform	Status
Series	Season(s)	First released	Last released	Based on	Showrunner(s)	Co-production with	Network/platform	Status
The Last of Us	2	January 15, 2023	present	The Last of Us by Naughty Dog	Craig Mazin; Neil Druckmann	The Mighty Mint; Word Games; Naughty Dog; Sony Pictures Television	HBO	Renewed
Twisted Metal	2	July 27, 2023	present	Twisted Metal by Sony Interactive Entertainment	Michael Jonathan Smith; David Reed	Wicked Deed; Reese Wernick Productions; Make It with Gravy; Inspire Entertainment; Electric Avenue; Artists First; Universal Television; Sony Pictures Television	Peacock	Renewed

==== Upcoming/in development ====
Series	U.S. release date	Based on	Showrunner(s)	Co-production with	Network/platform	Ref.
Ghost of Tsushima: Legends	2028	Ghost of Tsushima: Legends by Sucker Punch Productions	Takanobu Mizuno (director); Gen Urobuchi (writer)	Hayate Inc. Sony Music; Kamikaze Douga	Crunchyroll	
God of War	TBA	God of War by Santa Monica Studio	Ronald D. Moore	Sony Pictures Television; Vertigo Entertainment; Santa Monica Studio; Amazon MGM Studios; Tall Ship Productions	Amazon Prime Video	

== Reception ==
=== Box office performance ===
Film	U.S. release date	Box office gross			Budget	Ref.
Film	U.S. release date	U.S. and Canada	Other territories	Worldwide	Budget	Ref.
Uncharted	February 18, 2022	$148,648,820	$253,100,000	$401,748,820	$120 million	
Gran Turismo	August 25, 2023	$44,428,554	$77,499,324	$121,927,878	$60 million	
Until Dawn	April 25, 2025	$20,174,192	$30,000,000	$50,174,192	$15 million	
Resident Evil	September 18, 2026	$153,886,965	$230,308,052	$384,195,017	$75 million	
Total		$367,138,531	$590,907,376	$958,045,907	$270 million	

=== Critical and public response ===
==== Films ====
Film	Critical		Public	
Film	Rotten Tomatoes	Metacritic	CinemaScore	PostTrak
Uncharted	41% (265 reviews)	45 (44 reviews)	B+	79%
Gran Turismo	65% (225 reviews)	48 (47 reviews)	A	90%
Until Dawn	53% (120 reviews)	47 (23 reviews)	C+	63%
Resident Evil	96% (298 reviews)	79 (51 reviews)	B+	-

==== Television series ====
Television series	Season	Critical	
Television series	Season	Rotten Tomatoes	Metacritic
The Last of Us	Season 1	96% (486 reviews)	84 (43 reviews)
The Last of Us	Season 2	92% (270 reviews)	81 (44 reviews)
Twisted Metal	Season 1	67% (49 reviews)	55 (22 reviews)
Twisted Metal	Season 2	92% (25 reviews)	74 (5 reviews)

== See also ==
- PlayStation Network
- PlayStation Video

=== Related films ===
- Heavenly Sword
- Ratchet & Clank
