= Belmont Cameli =

American actor (born 1998)

Philip Belmont Cameli
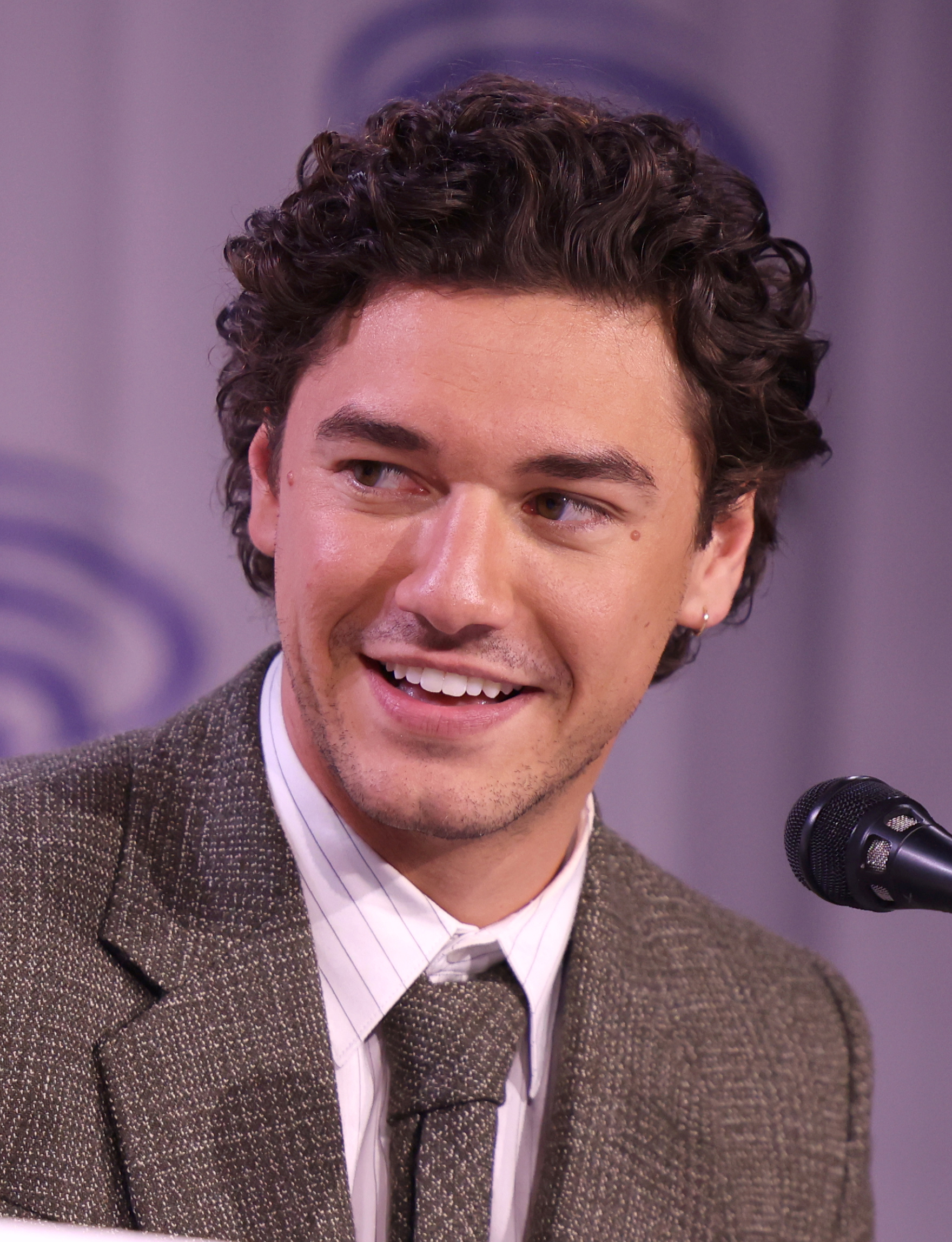
- Cameli in 2025
- Born: February 28, 1998 (age 28); Naperville, Illinois, U.S.
- Occupation: Actor/ Songwriter
- Years active: 2018–present

Philip Belmont Cameli (born February 28, 1998) is an American actor, best known for his roles as Jamie Spano in the Saved by the Bell reboot (2020–2021), Eli in the Netflix film Along for the Ride (2022) and Garrett Graham in the Amazon Prime Video series Off Campus (2026–present).

== Early life ==
Phillip Belmont Cameli was born in Naperville, Illinois.

He has primarily Italian ancestry on his father’s side. His paternal great-grandfather, Belmondo Cameli, was born in San Benedetto del Tronto, in the Marche region of central Italy, before moving to the United States and changing his forename to Belmont. Cameli’s parents gave him the same name in his honor. He has 12 siblings.

In high school, he played three sports. After graduating, he attended University of Illinois Urbana-Champaign as a business major. The unexpected death of his father in his freshman year made him leave college and pursue acting. He stayed in Chicago for a year pursuing modeling work, then moved to Los Angeles in 2019. He has an older brother, Patrick, and a younger sister, Julia.

== Career ==
Cameli made his acting debut with a guest appearance on Empire in 2018. He gained recognition for playing Jamie Spano, son of Elizabeth Berkley’s character Jessie Spano, in the Saved by the Bell reboot.

In 2022, Cameli starred in the Netflix film Along for the Ride, based on the novel by Sarah Dessen. He played Eli, a reserved character who forms a bond with the protagonist.

He portrayed Frankie Boy in the crime drama The Alto Knights, released in 2025.

Cameli appeared in Until Dawn, an adaptation of the 2015 video game by Until Dawn from Supermassive Games. Released on April 25, 2025, the film features a new story and characters, with Cameli cast as Abe.

In 2026, Cameli starred as Garrett Graham in the Off Campus series on Amazon Prime Video.

On June 6, 2026, Cameli performed “Girls” with The Kid LAROI after the song appeared in the TV show Off Campus.

In September 2026, Cameli was cast as Brom Bones in upcoming film Hollow alongside Sydney Sweeney.

== Personal life ==
In 2018, Cameli donated a kidney to a childhood friend in a 14-person transplant chain that saved seven lives.

== Filmography ==
=== Film ===
Year	Title	Role	Notes
2019	The Husband	Marcus	
2020	Most Guys Are Losers	Trevor	
2022	Along for the Ride	Eli	
2025	The Alto Knights	Frankie Boy	
2025	Until Dawn	Abe	

=== Television ===
Year	Title	Role	Notes
2018	Empire	Waiter	Episode: "Love All, Trust a Few"
2020–2021	Saved by the Bell	Jamie Spano	20 episodes
2023	Based on a True Story	Mason	3 episodes
2026–present	Off Campus	Garrett Graham	Main role
