= Bravo Team =

2018 video game

- Developer: Supermassive Games
- Publisher: Sony Interactive Entertainment
- Platform: PlayStation 4
- Release: March 6, 2018
- Genre: First-person shooter
- Mode: Single-player

Bravo Team is a 2018 virtual reality first-person shooter video game developed by Supermassive Games and published by Sony Interactive Entertainment for the PlayStation 4's virtual reality headset PlayStation VR.

== Development ==
Bravo Team was developed by Supermassive Games. It was announced for PlayStation VR along with The Inpatient. Development for the game lasted 13 months. Originally planned for release on December 5, 2017, it was delayed for March 6, 2018.

== Reception ==
Reception

Aggregate score
Aggregator	Score
Metacritic	45/100

Review scores
Publication	Score
Destructoid	3.5/10
GameSpot	4/10
Push Square	5/10

Bravo Team debuted at number three in the UK sales charts for the week of March 10, 2018.

Bravo Team received negative reception from video game critics. Eurogamer's Ian Higton called the game "an astonishingly bad VR shooter from a team that should know better".
