= Peter Stormare =

Swedish-American actor (born 1953)

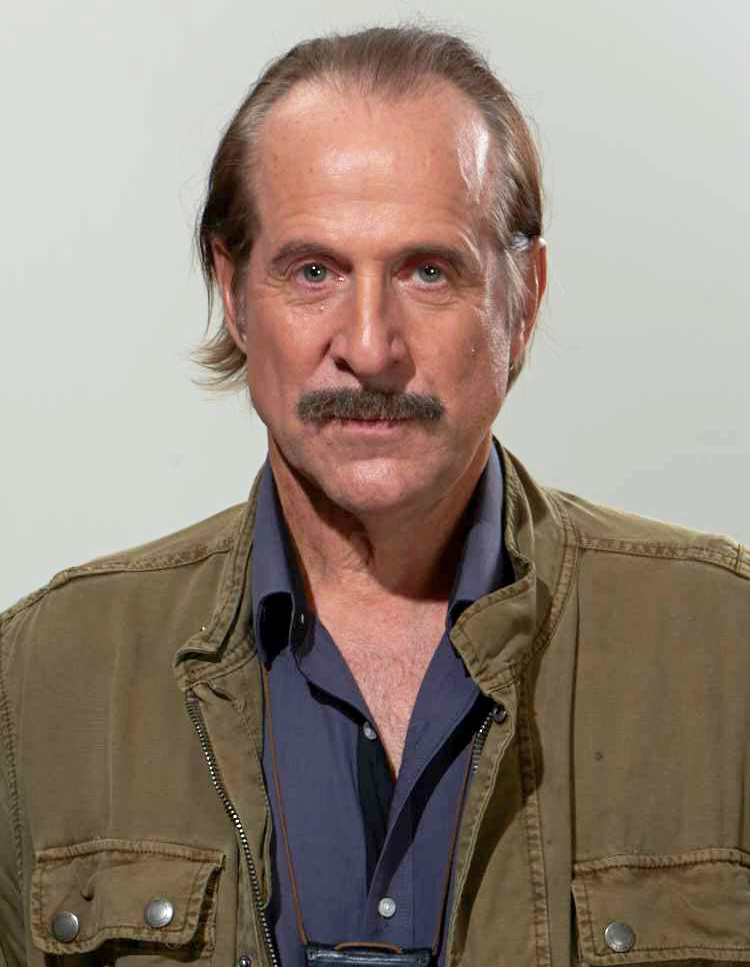
- Stormare in 2015
- Born: Rolf Peter Ingvar Storm; August 27, 1953 (age 73); Kumla, Sweden
- Citizenship: Sweden; United States
- Occupation: Actor
- Years active: 1976–present
- Spouses: Karen Sillas (m. 1989; div. 2006) Toshimi Murakami (m. 2008)
- Children: 1
- Website: web.archive.org/web/20230307164619/https://www.stormare.se/

Rolf Peter Ingvar Stormare (Swedish: [ˈpěːtɛr ˈstɔ̂rːmarɛ]; né Storm, August 27, 1953) is a Swedish and American actor. He rose to prominence in Sweden for playing Hamlet for Ingmar Bergman in his 1988 production of the play, and in America for portraying Gaear Grimsrud in the film Fargo (1996). He has appeared in films including The Lost World: Jurassic Park (1997), The Big Lebowski (1998), Armageddon (1998), Dancer in the Dark (2000), Minority Report (2002), Bad Boys II (2003), Birth (2004), Constantine (2005), Nacho Libre (2006), 22 Jump Street (2014), John Wick: Chapter 2 (2017), and Until Dawn (2025).

On television, he portrayed John Abruzzi in Prison Break (2005–2007). He has also appeared in video games such as Command & Conquer: Red Alert 3 (2008), Mercenaries 2: World in Flames (2008) Call of Duty: Black Ops 2 (2012), The Elder Scrolls Online (2014), Destiny (2014), and Until Dawn (2015).

== Early life ==
Rolf Peter Ingvar Storm was born in Kumla, Sweden, on August 27, 1953. His family moved to Arbrå. He attended the Royal Dramatic Theatre in Stockholm, where he studied acting. He changed his surname when he discovered he shared it with a senior student at acting academy. Before settling on Stormare, he briefly contemplated changing his name to Retep Mrots, which is "Peter Storm" backwards. Stormare means "stormer" in Swedish.

== Career ==
=== Acting ===
Stormare starred in Ingmar Bergman's production of Hamlet; Hilary DeVries of The Christian Science Monitor wrote: "in the electrifying lead performance by Peter Stormare, Hamlet is, for all his Angst-filled poses and dark glasses, no hamstrung cliche but Denmark's only ballast between the debauched Claudius and the fascistic Fortinbras."

Known for playing different nationalities: an American in The Lost World: Jurassic Park (1997), a German in The Big Lebowski (1998), an Italian in The Brothers Grimm (2005) and Prison Break (2005), a Frenchman in Chocolat (2000), and a Russian in Armageddon (1998), Bad Boys II (2003) and Siberian Education (2013).

In February 2006, he starred as Wolfgang in Volkswagen's VDub series of television commercials. He played the main character in the film Svartvattnet, which was filmed in Sweden and Norway in 2007. He was offered a role in the ABC television series Lost for a period of one year, which he declined. In the 2007 film Premonition, he played Dr. Roth. In April 2007, he appeared in the CSI: Crime Scene Investigation episode "Ending Happy".

In 2011, he appeared alongside Kevin Spacey and Daniel Wu in the Chinese film Inseparable, which premiered at the 2011 Busan International Film Festival.

In 2014, he appeared in episodes of Longmire, Arrow, and The Blacklist, and starred in the Eli Roth–produced film Clown.

In 2016, he played Rutger Burlin in the Swedish television series Midnattssol; he also co-created, and starred as Ingmar in, the web television series Swedish Dicks, which was renewed for a second season in October 2016. In 2017, he played a minor role in John Wick: Chapter 2 and the part of Czernobog on the Starz series American Gods. He played the vampire Godbrand in the Netflix animated series Castlevania.

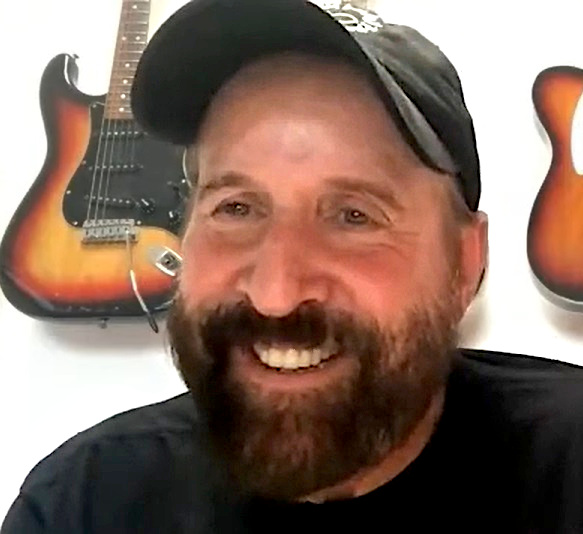
Peter Stormare in 2021

Stormare voiced Mattias Nilsson in the video games Mercenaries: Playground of Destruction and Mercenaries 2: World in Flames, Isair in the video game Icewind Dale 2, and Johann Strauss in Quake 4. In 2015, he voiced and motion-captured Dr. Alan J. Hill in the video game Until Dawn. He reprised his role in the 2024 remake and the film adaptation which was released in April 2025. On November 7, 2025, Stormare appeared on the ABC Daytime soap opera General Hospital.

=== Music ===
After Bono of U2 heard some of Stormare's music, he encouraged Stormare to make an album. In 2002, Stormare released his first album, Dallerpölsa och småfåglar. He plays in a band called Blonde from Fargo and runs a record label called StormVox.

He appeared in the music video of the song "Uprising" by the Swedish power metal band Sabaton.

He appeared in the clips "Steh Auf" and "Frau & Mann" of metal project Lindemann.

In 2019, he appeared in the music video of the song "Graven" by the U.S. death metal band Possessed.

In 2026, He appeared in the music video of the song "One on One" by the Swedish Glam Metal band Europe.

== Personal life ==
Stormare divides his time between the United States and Sweden. He married actress Karen Sillas in 1989, and they divorced in 2006. He married Toshimi Murakami, a native of Japan, in 2008. Their daughter was born in 2009. They reside in Los Angeles. Stormare is a dual citizen of Sweden and the United States, having naturalized as an American citizen during the late 1990s.

Peter Stormare is the godfather of actor Gustaf Skarsgård.

Stormare is a Christian and has said that he has had contact with God. When he was young, he participated in Baptist meetings in Arbrå. He has a strong spiritual side, inherited from his mother, who he has said was a medium, and who supposedly inherited that ability from her own father.

== Filmography ==
=== Film ===
Year	Title	Role	Notes
1978	Lyftet	Prisoner	
1982	Fanny and Alexander	Young Man	
1986	Den frusna leoparden	Jerry	
1987	Pirates of the Lake	Justus	
1990	Awakenings	Neurochemist	
1991	Freud flyttar hemifrån...	Berra	
1991	Reflections in a Dark Sky	Carlo	
1992	Damage	Peter Wetzler	
1996	Fargo	Gaear Grimsrud	
1997	Playing God	Vladimir	
1997	The Lost World: Jurassic Park	Dieter Stark	
1998	Armageddon	Lev Andropov	
1998	Mercury Rising	Shayes	
1998	The Big Lebowski	Uli Kunkel / Karl Hungus	
1998	Hamilton	Carl Hamilton	
1998	Somewhere in the City	Graham	
1999	Purgatory	Cavin Guthrie	
1999	8mm	Dino Velvet	
2000	Bruiser	Milo Styles	
2000	Chocolat	Serge Muscat	
2000	Dancer in the Dark	Jeff	
2000	The Million Dollar Hotel	Dixie	
2000	Circus	Julius	
2001	Happy Campers	Oberon	
2002	13 Moons	Slovo	
2002	The Beatle Fan	Albert	
2002	Spun	Mullet Cop	
2002	Minority Report	Dr. Solomon P. Eddie	
2002	Windtalkers	Gunnery Sergeant Hjelmstad	
2002	The Tuxedo	Dr. Simms	
2002	Bad Company	Adrik Vas	
2003	Bad Boys II	Alexei	
2003	The Movie Hero	The Suspicious Character	
2004	Birth	Clifford	
2005	The Batman vs. Dracula	Count Dracula	Voice, direct-to-video
2005	The Brothers Grimm	Cavaldi	
2005	2001 Maniacs	Professor Ackerman	
2005	Buck Rogers to the Xtreme!		
2005	Constantine	Lucifer	
2006	Nacho Libre	Emperor	Cameo
2006	Unknown	Snakeskin Boots	
2007	Premonition	Dr. Roth	
2007	Anamorph	Blair Collet	
2007	Boot Camp	Arthur Hail	
2007	They Never Found Her	Woods	
2007	Switch	Tommen	
2007	Gone with the Woman	Glenn	
2008	Gnomes and Trolls: The Secret Chamber	Slim	Voice
2008	Witless Protection	Arthur Grimsley	
2008	Insanitarium	Dr. Gianetti	
2008	Varg	Klemens	
2009	The Killing Room	Dr. Phillips	
2009	Horsemen	David Spitz	
2009	The Imaginarium of Doctor Parnassus	The President	
2010	Corridor	Micke	
2010	Moomins and the Comet Chase	Snufkin	Voice
2010	Undocumented	Z	
2010	Small Town Murder Songs	Walter	
2010	Henry's Crime	Darek Millodragovic	
2010	Janie Jones	Sloan	
2011	Dylan Dog: Dead of Night	Gabriel	
2011	Marianne	Sven	
2011	Inseparable	Richard	
2011	The Hunters 2	Torsten	
2011	Hjelp, vi er i filmbransjen	Peter Stormare	
2012	Big Top Scooby-Doo!	Wulfric Von Rydingsvard	Voice
2012	Lockout	Scott Langral	
2012	Get the Gringo	Frank Fowler	
2012	Small Apartments	Mr. Olivetti	
2012	Tai Chi Hero	Duke Fleming	
2013	Hansel and Gretel: Witch Hunters	Sheriff Berringer	
2013	The Last Stand	Thomas Burrell	
2013	Siberian Education	"Ink"	
2013	Autumn Blood	The Mayor	
2013	Bad Milo!	Highsmith	
2013	Trial of Arms	Karkov	
2013	Sleight of Hand	Terry "Terrible Terry"	
2013	The Pendant	White	
2013	The Zero Theorem	Doctor	
2013	Pain & Gain	Dr. Bjornson	
2014	22 Jump Street	"The Ghost"	
2014	Rage	O'Connell	
2014	Mall	Barry	
2014	Penguins of Madagascar	Corporal	Voice
2014	Bang Bang Baby	George	
2014	The 11th Hour	The Russian	
2014	Clown	Herbert Karlsson	
2015	Dark Summer	Stokes	
2015	Strange Magic	Thang	Voice
2015	Every Thing Will Be Fine	Editor	
2016	Rupture	Terrance	
2016	King of the Dancehall	Pierce Davidson	
2017	John Wick: Chapter 2	Abram Tarasov	
2017	The Nut Job 2: Nutty by Nature	Gunther	Voice
2017	VIP	Paul Gray	
2017	Kill 'Em All	Holman	
2018	Beyond the Sky	Peter Norton	
2018	Age of Summer	The Rock God	
2018	The Assassin's Code	Kurt Schlychter	
2019	The Poison Rose	Slide Olsen	
2020	Songbird	Emmett Harland	
2021	Gift of Fire		Voice
2021	Cryptozoo	Gustav the Faun	Voice
2021	Horror Noire	Erebus	
2022	Day Shift	Troy	Cameo
2022	Food and Romance	Henrik	
2023	The Ritual Killer	Captain Marchand	
2024	Kill 'Em All 2	Holman	
2025	Until Dawn	Dr. Alan J. Hill	
2025	Off the Grid	Belcor	
2025	Stand Your Ground	Bastion	
2026	Kill Code		Post-production

=== Television ===
Year	Title	Role	Notes
1984–1988	Träpatronerna	Bokhållaren	5 episodes
1986	Seppan	Sara's Father	Television film
1993	Morsarvet	Kapten Bergkvist	Miniseries
1993	The Bacchae	The Messenger	Television film
1995	Screen Two	Byrd	Episode: "Black Easter"
1996	Swift Justice	Johnny "Johnny D"	Episode: "Stones"
1997	In the Presence of a Clown	Petrus Landahl	Television film
1998	Seinfeld	Pete "Slippery Pete"	Episode: "The Frogger"
2002	Watching Ellie	Ingvar	11 episodes
2003	Hitler: The Rise of Evil	Ernst Röhm	Television film
2004	Joey	Viktor	Episode: "Joey and the Husband"
2005–2007	Prison Break	John Abruzzi	20 episodes
2007	CSI: Crime Scene Investigation	George "Binky" Babinkian	Episode: "Ending Happy"
2008	Transformers: Animated	Prometheus Black / Meltdown	Voice, 3 episodes
2008	Monk	Petya Lovak	Episode: "Mr. Monk Paints His Masterpiece"
2009	Entourage	Aaron Cohen	2 episodes
2009	Tim and Eric Awesome Show, Great Job!	Gorb	Episode: "Road Trip"
2010	Weeds	Chef	2 episodes
2010	Hawaii Five-0	Drago Zankovic	Episode: "Ohana"
2010	Adventure Time	Sir Slicer	Voice, episode: "Blood Under the Skin"
2011	Ben 10: Ultimate Alien	King Xarion	Voice, episode: "Viktor: The Spoils"
2011	Covert Affairs	Max Kupala	Episode: "The Outsiders"
2011	Wilfred	Trashface	Episode: "Isolation"
2011	Leverage	Gunter Hanzig	Episode: "The Office Job"
2012	NCIS: Los Angeles	Interpol Agent Martin Källström	Episode: "Crimeleon"
2012	Body of Proof	Wilson Polley	Episode: "Mind Games"
2013	Phineas and Ferb	Whiplash	Voice, episode: "Phineas and Ferb: Mission Marvel"
2014	Psych	Cyrus Polk	Episode: "Someone's Got a Woody"
2014	Rake	Jack Tarrant	Episode: "Serial Killer"
2014	The Blacklist	Milos Kirchoff / Berlin	6 episodes
2014–2015	Arrow	Werner Zytle / Vertigo	2 episodes
2014–2015	Manhattan	Lazar	5 episodes
2014–2017	Longmire	Chance Gilbert	6 episodes
2015, 2017	Penn Zero: Part-Time Hero	Rufus	Voice, 2 episodes
2015	Graceland	Martun Sarkissian	3 episodes
2015–2017	Teenage Mutant Ninja Turtles	Lord Dregg	Voice, 7 episodes
2016–2017	Black Widows	Folke Lundgren	9 episodes
2016–2018	Swedish Dicks	Ingmar Andersson	20 episodes; also co-creator
2016	Those Who Can't	Conrad Carson	2 episodes
2016	Midnattssol	Rutger Burlin	2 episodes
2017	Justice League Action	Mr. Freeze	Voice, 2 episodes
2017	Jeff & Some Aliens	Retirement Specialist, Cabbie	Voice, episode: "Jeff & Some Childlike Joy & Whimsy"
2017	Get Shorty	Hafdis Snaejornsson	6 episodes
2017–2018	Milo Murphy's Law	Tobias Trollhammer, Additional voices	Voices; 3 episodes
2017–2021	American Gods	Czernobog	5 episodes
2018	LA to Vegas	Artem	15 episodes
2018	Castlevania	Godbrand	Voice, 8 episodes
2020	Briarpatch	Gunther	Episode: "Behind God's Back"
2020	Teen Titans Go!	Fibulon	Voice, episode: "The Night Begins to Shine: Chapter Three: The Guitar"
2020	Rise of the Teenage Mutant Ninja Turtles	Kristoff Van Bradford	Voice, episode: "Fists of Furry"
2020	Animaniacs	Nickelwise	Voice, episode: "Fear and Laughter in Burbank"
2020–2021	Secrets of the Viking Stone	Himself	12 episodes
2021	The Box	Jedidiah Brag	7 episodes
2022	Fångarna på fortet	Kapten Kaboom	12 episodes
2022	The Journey – 15 dagar i Nepal	Host / Traveler	8 episodes
2023	1923	Lucca	Episode: "Ghost of Zebrina"
2024	Tracker	Valtz	Episode: "Into The Wild"
2024	Twilight of the Gods	Ulfr	Voice, 7 episodes
2024	So Long, Marianne	Irving Layton	8 episodes
2025	General Hospital	Mystery man	Episode #1.15832
2025	Tales of the Teenage Mutant Ninja Turtles	Tokka	Voice, 3 episodes
2026	Jo Nesbø's Harry Hole	Odin	2 episodes

=== Video games ===
Year	Title	Role
2002	Icewind Dale II	Isair
2004	The Bard's Tale	Additional voices
2005	Quake 4	Johann Strauss
2005	Mercenaries: Playground of Destruction	Mattias Nilsson
2008	Mercenaries 2: World in Flames	Mattias Nilsson
2008	Command & Conquer: Red Alert 3	Dr. Gregor Zelinsky
2009	Wanted: Weapons of Fate	The Immortal
2010	Prison Break: The Conspiracy	John Abruzzi
2012	The Secret World	Dr. Aldini, Huiginn, Muninn
2012	Call of Duty: Black Ops 2	The Replacer
2014	The Elder Scrolls Online	Jorunn The Skald King
2014	Destiny	Arach Jalaal
2015	Lego Jurassic World	Dieter Stark
2015	Until Dawn	Dr. Alan J. Hill
2016	Call of Duty: Black Ops 3	The Replacer
2017	The Elder Scrolls Online: Morrowind	Jorunn The Skald King
2017	King of the Dancehall	Pierce Davidson
2017	Destiny 2	Arach Jalaal
2018	The Elder Scrolls Online: Summerset	Jorunn The Skald King
2019	The Elder Scrolls Online: Elsweyr	Jorunn The Skald King
2019	Call of Duty: Black Ops 4	The Replacer
2020	The Elder Scrolls Online: Greymoor	Jorunn The Skald King
2020	Fast & Furious Crossroads	Ormstrid
2021	The Elder Scrolls Online: Blackwood	Jorunn The Skald King
2024	Call of Duty: Black Ops 6	The Replacer
2025	Call of Duty: Black Ops 7	The Replacer
2025	Fresh Tracks	Sogvar (God of Metal)
2027	Until Dawn 2	Dr. Alan J. Hill

=== Music videos ===
Year	Artist	Title
2007	The Poodles	"Seven Seas"
2010	Sabaton	"Uprising"
2013	Susan James	“Driving Toward The Sun”
2019	Possessed	"Graven"
2019	Lindemann	"Steh Auf"
2019	Lindemann	"Frau & Mann"
2024	Pain	"Go With The Flow"
2026	Europe	"One on One"

== Discography ==
Year	Title
2002	Dallerpölsa och småfåglar
2004	Swänska hwisor vol 1
2005	Lebowski-Fest 2005
