= Until Dawn (film) =

2025 film by David F. Sandberg

- Theatrical release poster
- Directed by: David F. Sandberg
- Screenplay by: Gary Dauberman; Blair Butler
- Story by: Blair Butler; Gary Dauberman
- Based on: Until Dawn by PlayStation Studios (Note: Until Dawn was developed by Supermassive Games, published by Sony Computer Entertainment, directed by Will Byles and Nik Bowen, written by Larry Fessenden and Graham Reznick, produced by Pete Samuels, and designed by Tom Heaton; PlayStation Studios, formerly known at the time of the game's release as SCE Worldwide Studios, oversaw development of the game.)
- Produced by: Asad Qizilbash; Carter Swan; David F. Sandberg; Lotta Losten; Roy Lee; Gary Dauberman; Mia Maniscalco
- Starring: Ella Rubin; Michael Cimino; Odessa A'zion; Ji-young Yoo; Belmont Cameli; Maia Mitchell; Peter Stormare
- Cinematography: Maxime Alexandre
- Edited by: Michel Aller
- Music by: Benjamin Wallfisch
- Production companies: Screen Gems; PlayStation Productions; Mangata; Vertigo Entertainment; Coin Operated
- Distributed by: Sony Pictures Releasing
- Release date: April 25, 2025
- Running time: 103 minutes
- Country: United States
- Language: English
- Budget: $15 million
- Box office: $54 million

Until Dawn is a 2025 American survival horror film adapted from the 2015 video game by PlayStation Studios, and it is set in the same universe while featuring an original standalone story that expands upon the game's mythology. The film takes place between the events of the games in the series, the 2015 video game and Until Dawn 2 (2027). Directed by David F. Sandberg, and written by Gary Dauberman and Blair Butler. It stars Ella Rubin, Michael Cimino, Odessa A'zion, Ji-young Yoo, and Belmont Cameli as a group of friends who end up in a secluded area embedded with a time loop mechanic; a threat is out to hunt them where dying restarts the night with a new threat each time, and the only solution is to survive until morning. Peter Stormare also stars, reprising his role from the game.

In January 2024, Sony Pictures announced the film's development with Screen Gems and PlayStation Productions set to produce. Casting announcements were made throughout 2024 and principal photography took place between August and October 2024 in Budapest. The crew features frequent collaborators of Sandberg, including composer Benjamin Wallfisch, cinematographer Maxime Alexandre, and editor Michel Aller.

Until Dawn was released in the United States by Sony Pictures Releasing on April 25, 2025. The film received mixed reviews from critics and grossed $54 million worldwide.

== Plot ==
Clover, her ex-boyfriend Max, her friends Nina and Megan, and Nina's boyfriend, Abe, are retracing the steps of Clover's missing sister, Melanie. The group stops by a gas station from which Melanie had previously sent a message, and Clover meets the station attendant, Hill. He claims that people tend to go missing near Glore Valley, a mining town. They head there, but heavy rainfall forces them to seek shelter at a visitor center. There, Abe finds a wall filled with posters of missing persons, including Melanie. Nina signs the center's guestbook. Downstairs, the group finds another house underneath. A masked assailant kills Abe in the poster room, then kills Nina, Max, Megan, and Clover as they try to hide, flee, and attack him.

They awaken on the first night with a new, additional guestbook signature and their own missing persons posters on the board. They realize that the night is repeating, indicated by an hourglass in the main room. Megan is possessed and killed by a supernatural force that drags Clover into a dilapidated house across from the center, where she meets an elderly Glore Valley resident who says she can "survive the night or become part of it", then gasses her before disintegrating. Max tries to convince Abe and Nina to rescue Clover, but they try to escape instead. They flee in the car, but after seeing a giant creature in the woods, they turn back and are again killed by the assailant. Max goes alone and finds Clover, now possessed, and she immediately kills him before being run over by the masked assailant.

The night begins anew as the group realizes they are in a time loop with only thirteen deaths before the loop ends. They barricade themselves in the bathroom and drink the tap water, which causes them to explode. Before Clover dies, she sees Hill, who tells her that they cannot wait out the night. Starting again, the group finds a recording of Hill studying a man trapped inside a room. The man goes insane over the course of thirteen nights, ultimately turning into a wendigo. Clover contacts Hill through a radio, who claims that they can escape if one person permanently dies. He tells Clover to meet him in the woods alone, and that he might let her see Melanie. An argument arises between the group. Nina, angered by Abe's attempt to abandon them, impales him with a pickaxe. While Clover, Max, and Megan explore the woods, Abe and Nina are murdered again. Max and Megan are attacked by a wendigo in the woods, and Megan dies. Clover and Max find Melanie, who has turned into a wendigo herself. Heartbroken, Clover tells Max to kill her so they can learn more; he slits her throat and drinks the water to explode.

The next night, the group discovers that Glore Valley sank into the ground after a mining disaster, killing hundreds, and that Hill was brought in to act as a therapist to the survivors. The group awakens on their thirteenth night with no memory of the last several loops, their bodies starting to deteriorate into wendigos. Abe reviews footage on his phone showing that they tried to find Hill over several nights, but were repeatedly slaughtered by various creatures. They realize Megan is missing and find that she survived a night and has followed Hill into the tunnels. Ready to confront Hill, the group follows Megan's trail, fending off wendigos. Clover splits from the others and is forced to kill Melanie. She arrives at a sanatorium, where Megan is trapped with a wendigo. Clover confronts Hill, who reveals he is running experiments, and the creatures they faced are manifestations of Clover's depression and fears. Clover moves Hill's coffee under the water dripping from a ceiling pipe, and he explodes after drinking from the mug. She frees Megan as the others kill the masked assailant. The group flees through the tunnels and escape as the hourglass runs out and the sun rises, ending the time loop. After they drive away, the surveillance system in Hill's office changes to a snowy cabin where a car pulls up, with Hill heard whistling. (Note: Due to its ambiguity, the ending has been interpreted to indicate that the film takes place before the video game, or that it takes place after with a different group arriving to the same cabin depicted in the game. Director David F. Sandberg did not give a definitive answer, saying that the creative team intended the film to take place after the game during production, but that the final scene "implies that it could take place before the game".)

== Cast ==
Main cast of Until Dawn
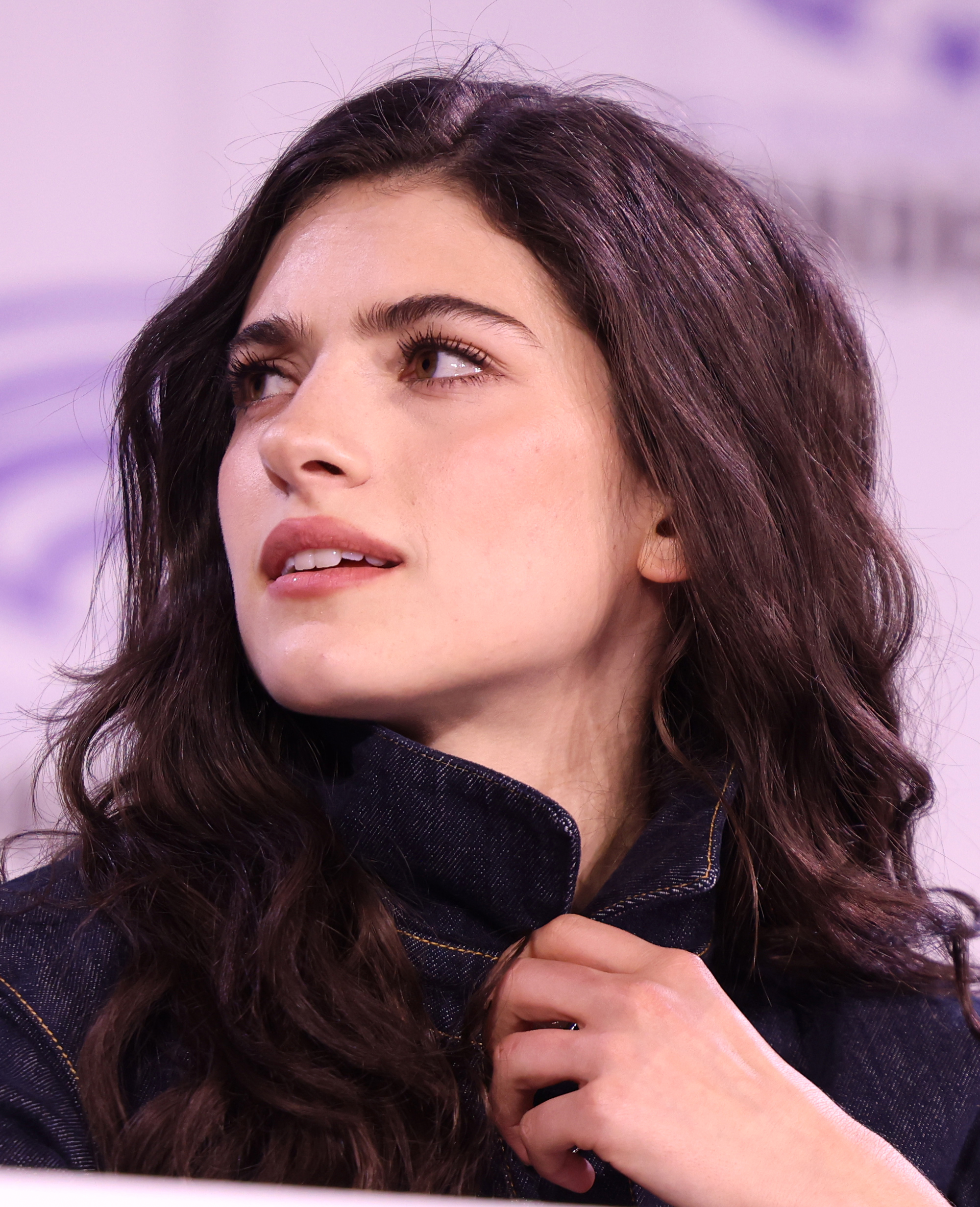
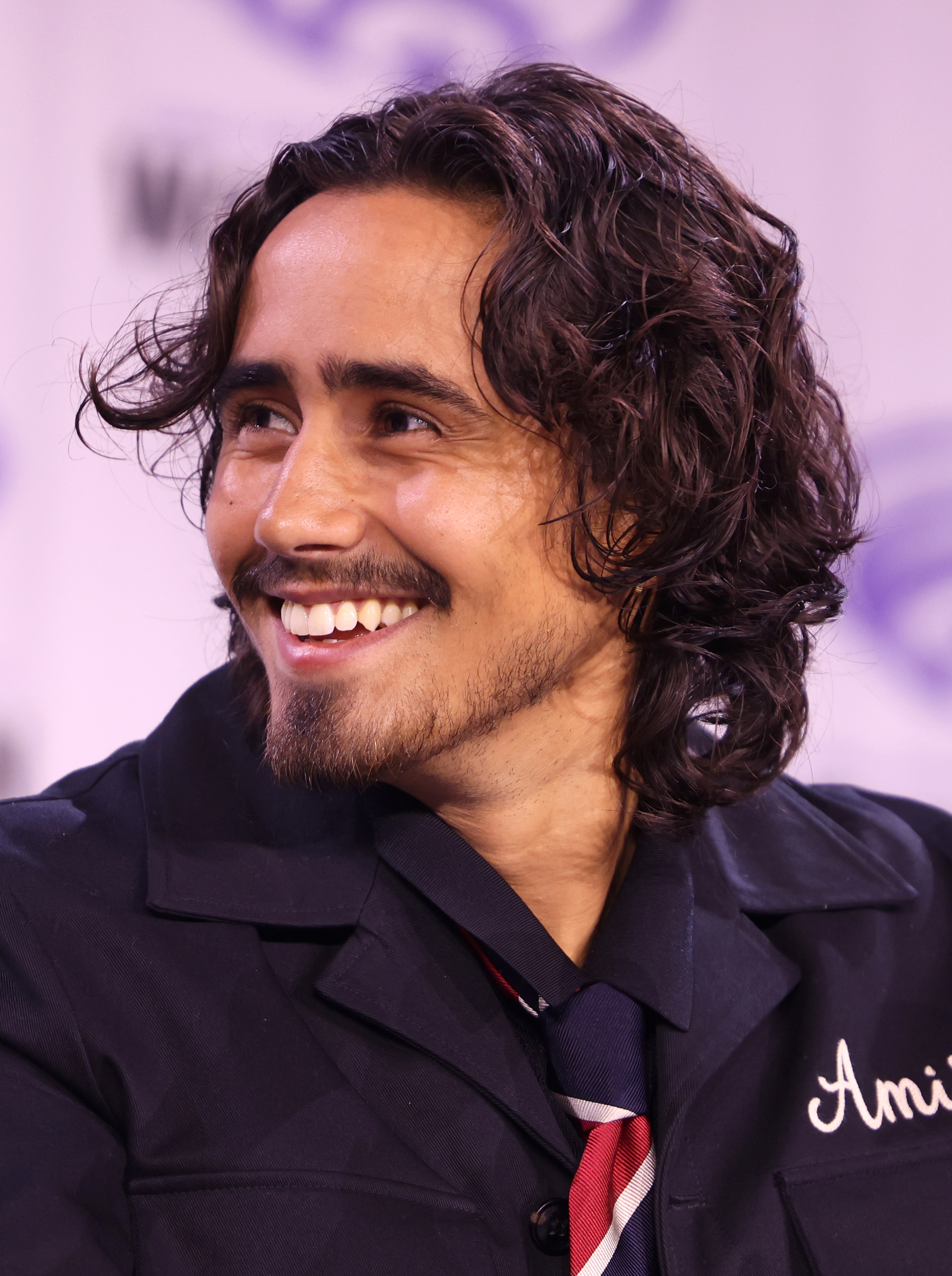
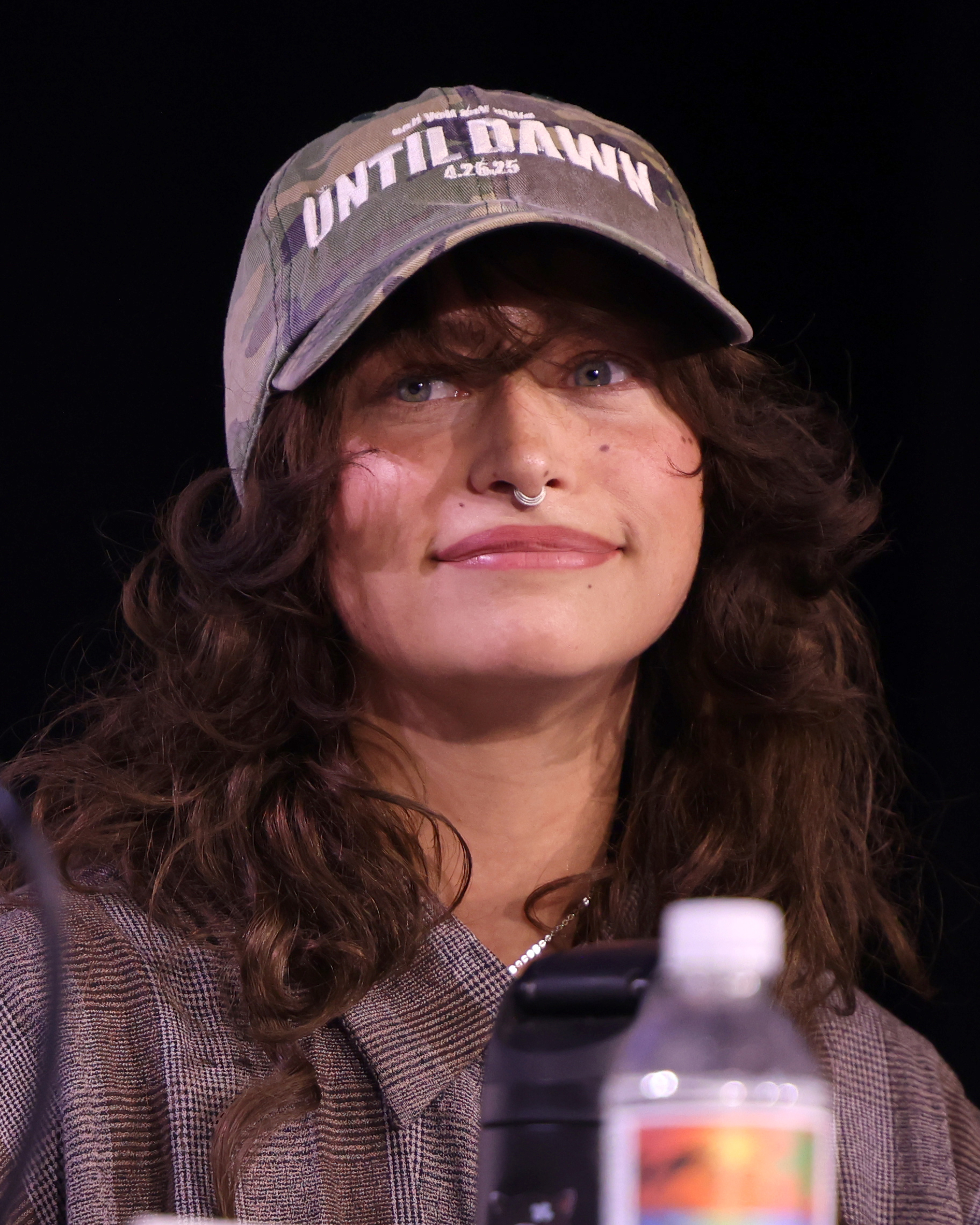
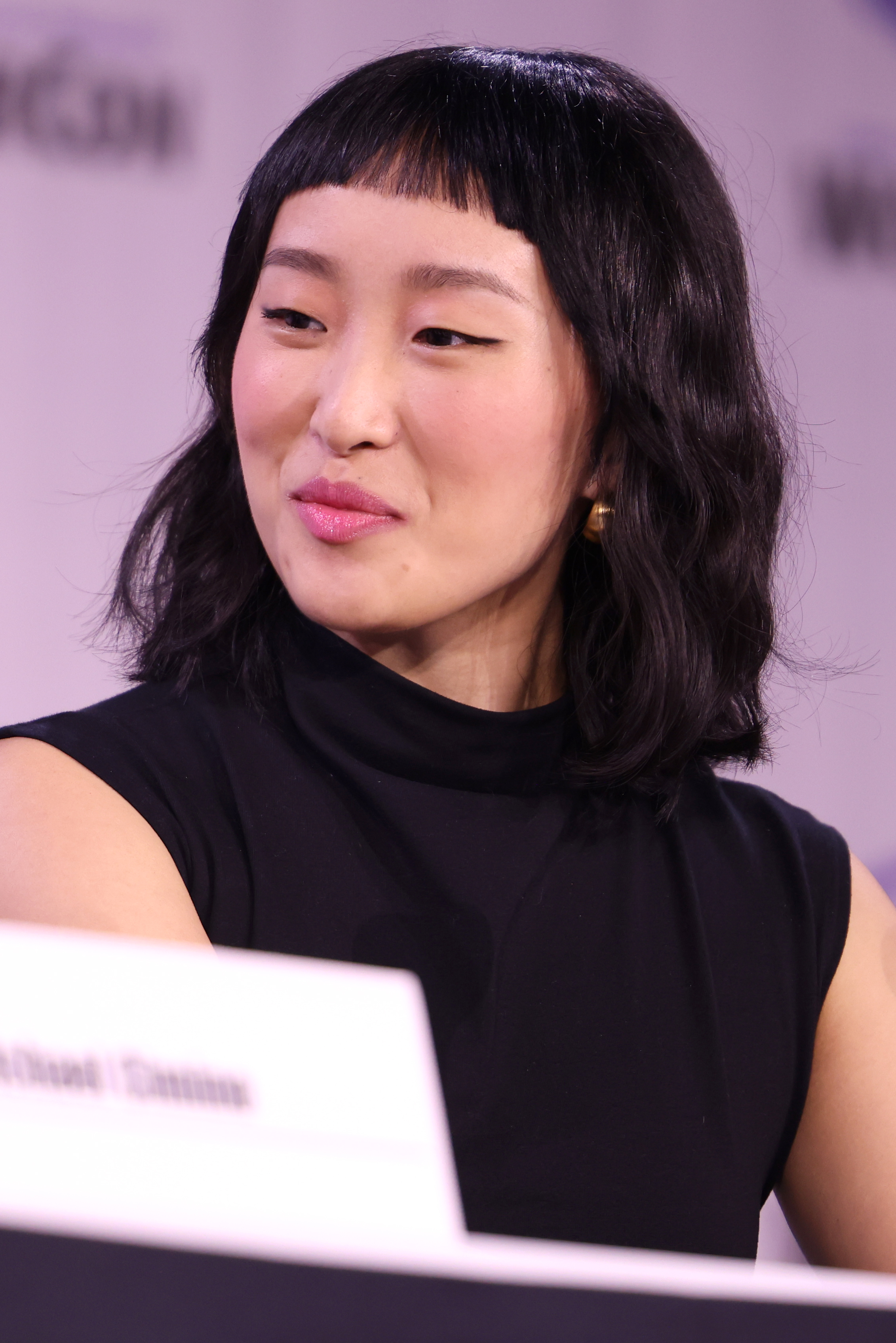
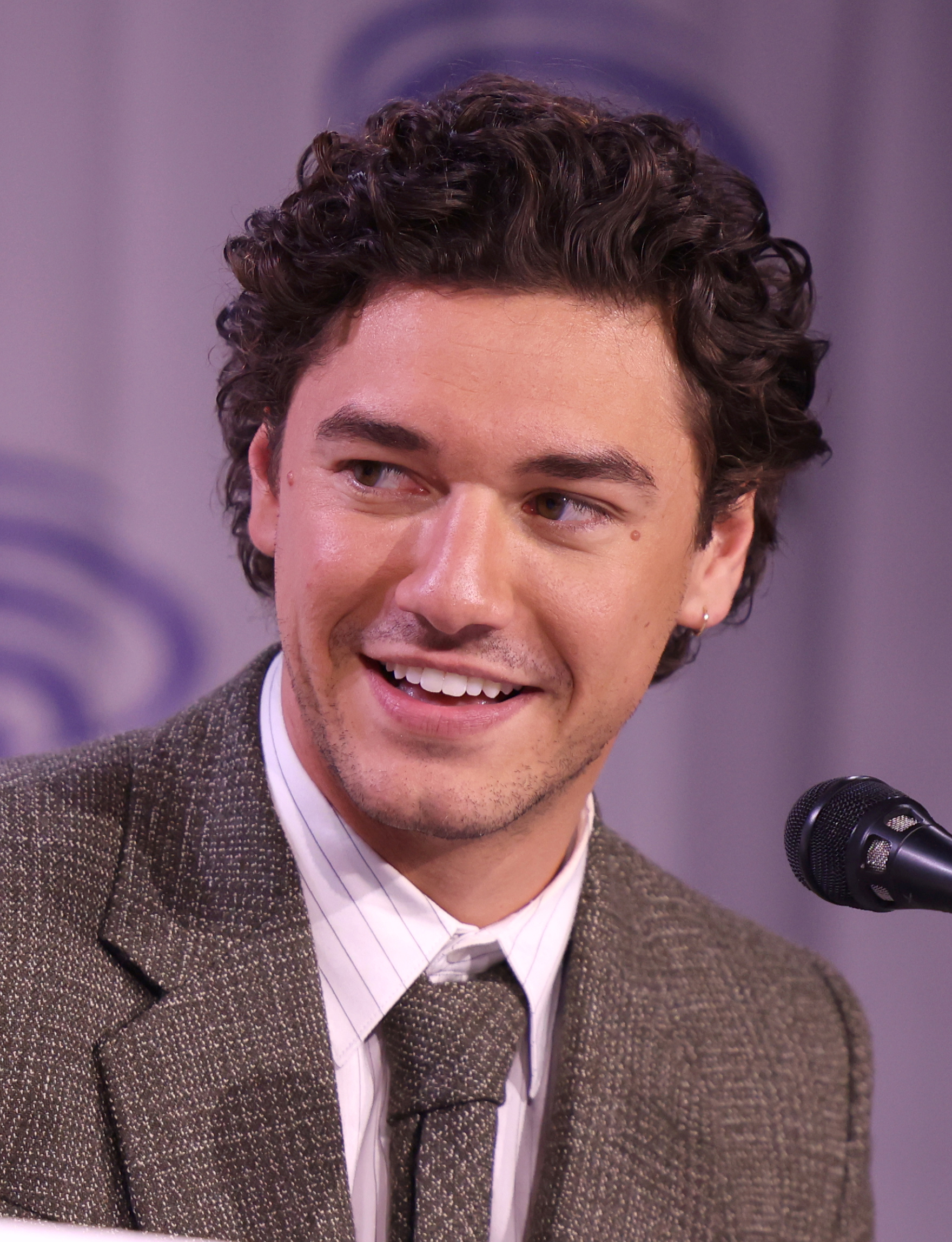
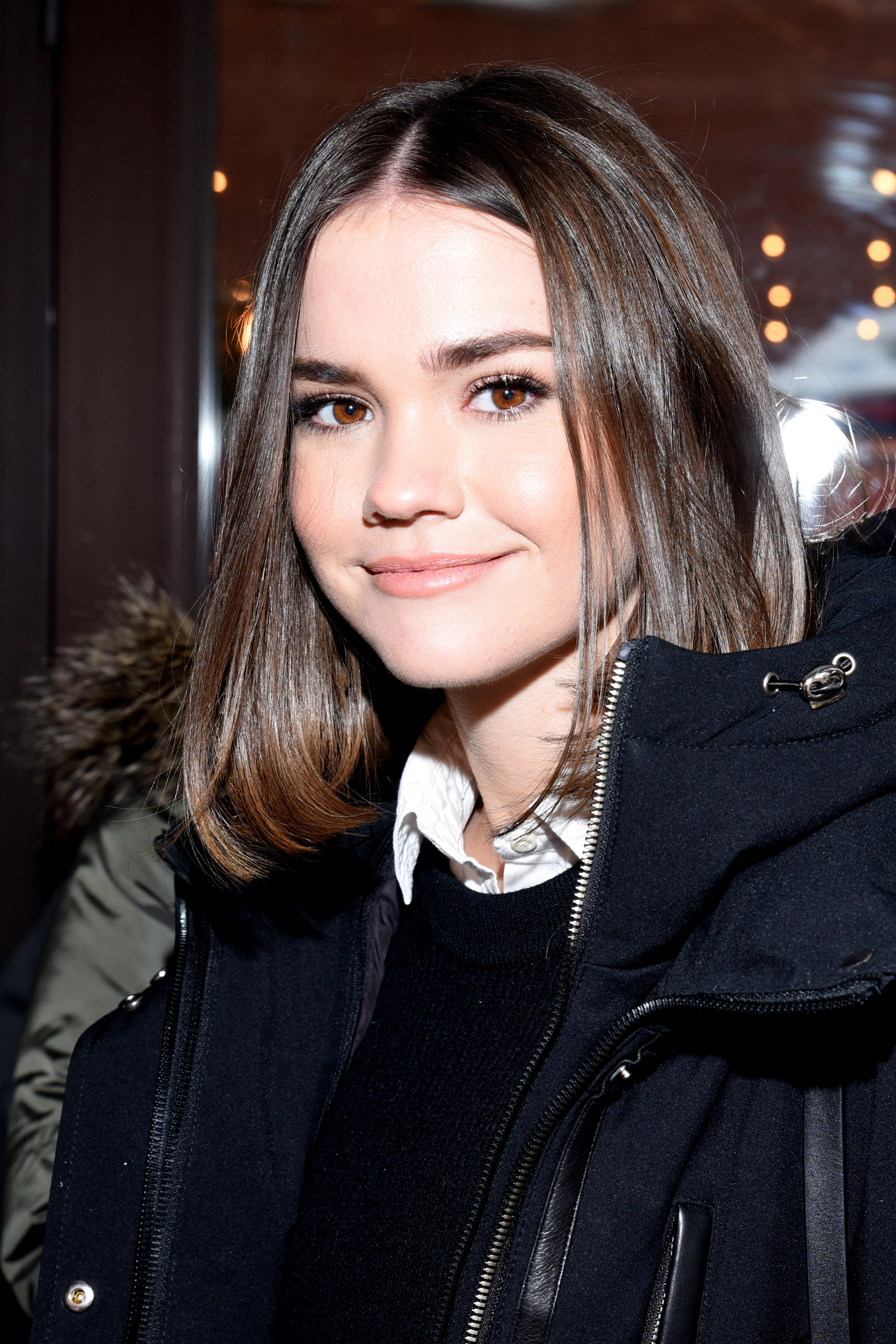
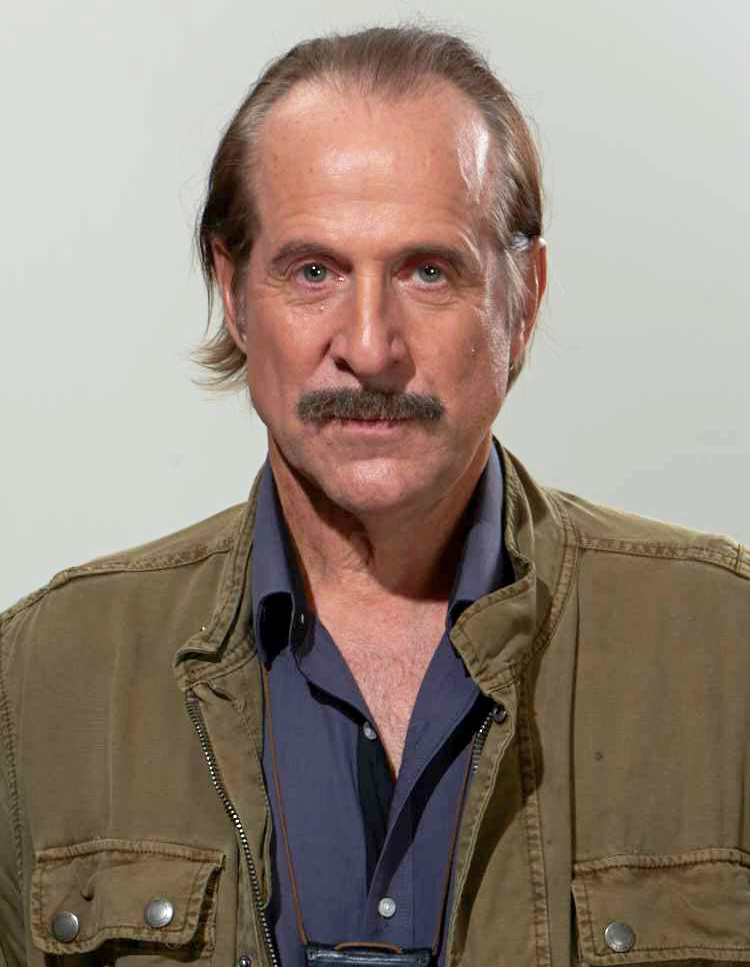
(Left to right) Ella Rubin, Michael Cimino, Odessa A'zion, Ji-young Yoo, Belmont Cameli, Maia Mitchell, and Peter Stormare
- Ella Rubin as Clover, a girl searching for her missing sister, Melanie
- Michael Cimino as Max, Clover's ex-boyfriend
- Odessa A'zion as Nina, Clover's best friend
- Ji-young Yoo as Megan, Max's stepsister
- Belmont Cameli as Abe, Nina's boyfriend
- Maia Mitchell as Melanie, Clover's older sister who is missing
  - Zsófia Temesvári as Melanie in wendigo form
- Peter Stormare as Dr. Alan Hill, a psychologist
- Tibor Szauerwein as "Psycho", a masked murderer
- Lotta Losten as a reporter
- Mariann Borbála Hermányi as the Glore Witch

Additionally, director David F. Sandberg appears in an image of a missing person.

== Production ==
In January 2024, it was announced that a live-action adaptation based on the video game Until Dawn was in development by Screen Gems and PlayStation Productions, with David F. Sandberg directing and Gary Dauberman writing the screenplay, based on a previous draft by Blair Butler. It was described as "an R-rated love letter to the horror genre, with an ensemble cast". In June, Ella Rubin, Michael Cimino, Ji-young Yoo, and Odessa A'zion joined the cast in undisclosed roles. In August, Maia Mitchell and Belmont Cameli were cast. Peter Stormare reprised his role of Dr. Alan J. Hill from the video game.

Principal photography began in Budapest on August 5, 2024, with Maxime Alexandre serving as the cinematographer. Filming wrapped on October 4, 2024. Benjamin Wallfisch provided the score for the film. Michel Aller edited the film.

== Release ==
The film was released theatrically in the United States by Sony Pictures Releasing on April 25, 2025. As part of a first window deal with Netflix, the movie was added on July 24, 2025.

=== Marketing ===
On January 14, 2025, Sony released a first-look where Sandberg, Dauberman, and Stormare break down the process behind making the film along with its story. The first trailer would release online two days later. The trailer introduced a limited time-loop mechanic, allowing the characters only a few "do-overs" after being killed by various monsters, similar to the game's emphasis on survival choices.

The release of the film's first trailer was criticized by online websites. Erik Kain of Forbes noted that while the film's concept is intriguing, the adaptation is redundant, comparing it to Uncharted and its corresponding 2022 film. He asserted that since the original Until Dawn's premise was to take the concept of watching a horror movie and transform it into an interactive experience, readapting it to film defeats its purpose. Editor-in-Chief Stacey Henley of The Gamer called the upcoming film "Hollywood's Latest Gaming Insult", listing Until Dawn as one of the many video game film adaptations that "disrespects" the source material.

In an interview with Screen Rant, Sandberg and Butler commented on the adaptation's relationship to the original game. Butler noted, "...it turned out that the remaster was coming out roughly the same time that we were hoping to get this movie together. And that was another reason that I think everyone involved, Gary [Dauberman], as well, didn't want to just remake the original storyline, beat for beat." Sandberg, in response, said,

...the game is pretty much a 10-hour movie, so I think it wouldn't have been as interesting for me if we were doing just the game, because then it's going to be like a cut-down, non-interactive version of the game, which just wouldn't be the same thing.

Sandberg further clarified that the film was another installment of the video game's universe, not a remake, in an interview with William Earl of Variety.

== Reception ==
=== Box office ===
Until Dawn has grossed $20 million in the United States and Canada, and $33 million in other territories, for a worldwide total of $54 million.

In the United States and Canada, Until Dawn was released alongside The Accountant 2, the wide expansion of The Legend of Ochi, and the re-release of Star Wars: Episode III – Revenge of the Sith, and was projected to gross $8–10 million from 3,055 theaters in its opening weekend. It made $3.2 million on its first day, and went on to debut to $8 million, finishing in fifth. It made $3.8 million in its second weekend (a drop of 52%) then $2 million in its third, finishing in fifth and eighth, respectively.

=== Critical response ===
On the review aggregator website Rotten Tomatoes, 51% of 119 critics' reviews are positive, with an average rating of 5.4/10. The website's consensus reads: "Until Dawn has a novel premise by rewinding the clock repeatedly to deliver multiple horror movies in one, but a lack of inspiration in each new variation yields a spoil of diminishing returns rather than riches." Metacritic, which uses a weighted average, assigned the film a score of 47 out of 100, based on 23 critics, indicating "mixed or average" reviews. Audiences polled by CinemaScore gave the film an average grade of "C+" on an A+ to F scale, while those surveyed by PostTrak gave it a 63% overall positive score, with 42% saying they would definitely recommend the film.

Louis Peitzman of Vulture wrote that Until Dawn has "a pile-on of ideas that threaten to collapse the movie under its own weight", but praised its creativity and meta-commentary on the slasher genre. He concluded that the film was saved by its humor, comparing it favorably to The Cabin in the Woods. RogerEbert.com's Brian Tallerico gave the film one and a half stars out of four, writing that the film had "really clever" ideas, but "lackluster" execution. He added that Maxime Alexandre's cinematography was "under-lit and depressingly flat", finding the video game's visual language to be stronger.

Katie Walsh of Los Angeles Times gave Until Dawn a positive review. She commended director Sandberg for embracing the film's "B-movie horror roots", describing the film as "part genre tribute, part choose your own adventure, part interactive haunted house". She lauded the writing as well, praising the main ensemble for being "fully formed characters". She concluded that Until Dawn was "bloody if lightweight fun". William Bibbiani of TheWrap criticized Until Dawn for its "shallow[ness]", "thin" characterizations, and "confusingly vague" writing that "spits in the face of logic". However, he found some of the scares "enjoyable" and described the premise as "clever". He wrote, "At its best Sandberg's 'Until Dawn' is an amusing delivery system for random drive-in horror frights, kinda like a genre movie slot machine," concluding that the film was not too good but not too bad either. Shortly after, Bibbiani named Until Dawn the 7th best film out of 28 in a ranking of "every horror movie based on a video game" also published by TheWrap.

Benjamin Lee of The Guardian gave Until Dawn three stars out of five. He commended the film for being "made with some skill and enlivened by a strong troupe of young actors", further complimenting the main cast for being "likable and committed". He described the film as "well-staged and entirely inoffensive", adding that it was certainly better than other recent horror films like The Monkey and The Gorge, though it "drastic[ally]" lacked the "IQ and ambition" of Sinners. IndieWire's Alison Foreman gave the film a grade of B−, writing that although it "betrays" the video game, the film was an "inventive experiment with pops of explosive humor that manage to seriously entertain". She remarked that she would have preferred for the film to be marketed with an original title, because Until Dawn worked best as a "full-blown horror spoof" and had few similarities with the game of the same name.

Various critics praised cast member Ji-young Yoo and her character Megan in particular. Bloody Disgusting's Meagan Navarro wrote that in the main cast, "the only one who comes close to a distinct personality is Ji-young Yoo's Megan". Elisabetta Bianchini of Yahoo News described Megan as the most interesting character in the main cast, adding that "you feel her emotional journey more so than you do for even the lead character, Clover." Likewise, Empire's Harry Stainer commended Yoo in his review of the film, writing, "Ji-young Yoo stands out as Megan, the group's psychic, and appears to be having more fun than anyone else on screen."

The film was nominated for Best Adaptation at the Game Awards 2025 but lost to The Last of Us season 2.

== See also ==
- List of films featuring time loops
