= Blair Butler =

American stand-up comic, television host and screenwriter

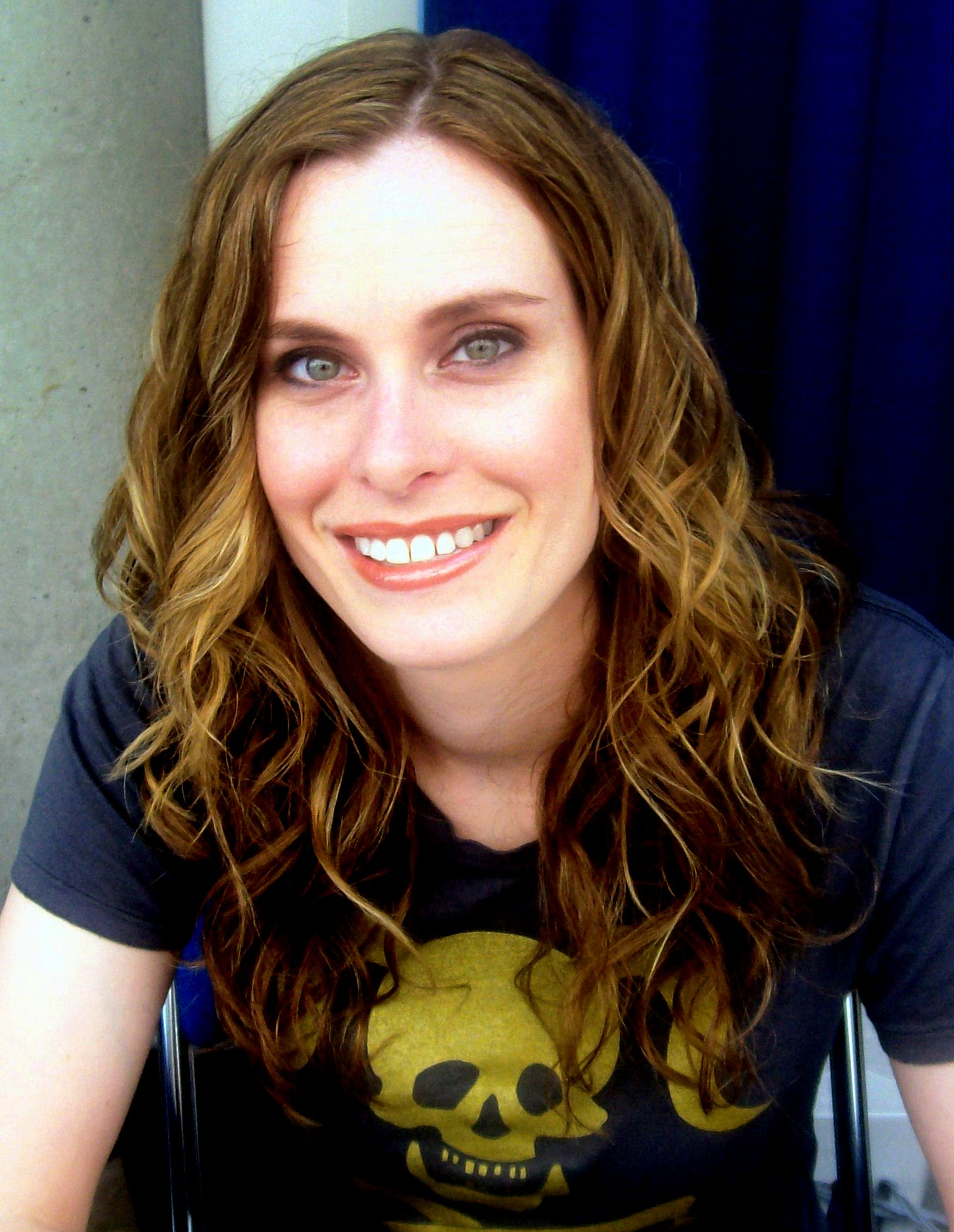
- Butler at San Diego Comic-Con, 2007.
- Born: June 28, 1977 (age 49); Fairway, Kansas, U.S.
- Website: http://www.blairbutler.com

Blair Butler (born June 28, 1977) is an American stand-up comic, television host and screenwriter, known for her work on the "Fresh Ink" and other segments on the G4 program Attack of the Show!.

== Career ==
Butler's father is Robert Butler, longtime film critic for the Kansas City Star.

Butler graduated from Lake Forest College in Lake Forest, Illinois. She became the head writer of G4's flagship television program X-Play. Although she identifies herself as a writer/producer, her work as a stand-up comedian, including being featured on Comedy Central's Premium Blend, opened the way for her to work on-camera.

During her years with X-Play, she participated in the show's re-occurring sketches and themes in the role of the "Drunk Writer", a female writer who wears oversized sunglasses and a T-shirt with the words "I Need Drink" and can always be seen with a bottle of liquor ("Rot Gut") and an unlit cigarette dangling from her mouth. (Butler does not smoke in real life.)

She then became the head writer for G4's "Attack of the Show," a daily hour of live television. There Butler frequently wrote and directed comedy skits for AOS co-host Olivia Munn. Among these were "Wonder Woman" and "The Lesbionic Woman."

She was later given her own segment called Fresh Ink where she critiqued comic books, reviewing the newest issues of comic books with her recommendation on whether to "buy", "browse", or "burn" them. Starting in 2007, the Fresh Ink segment evolved into Blair recommending good comics and collectibles from various comic stores in the L.A. area.

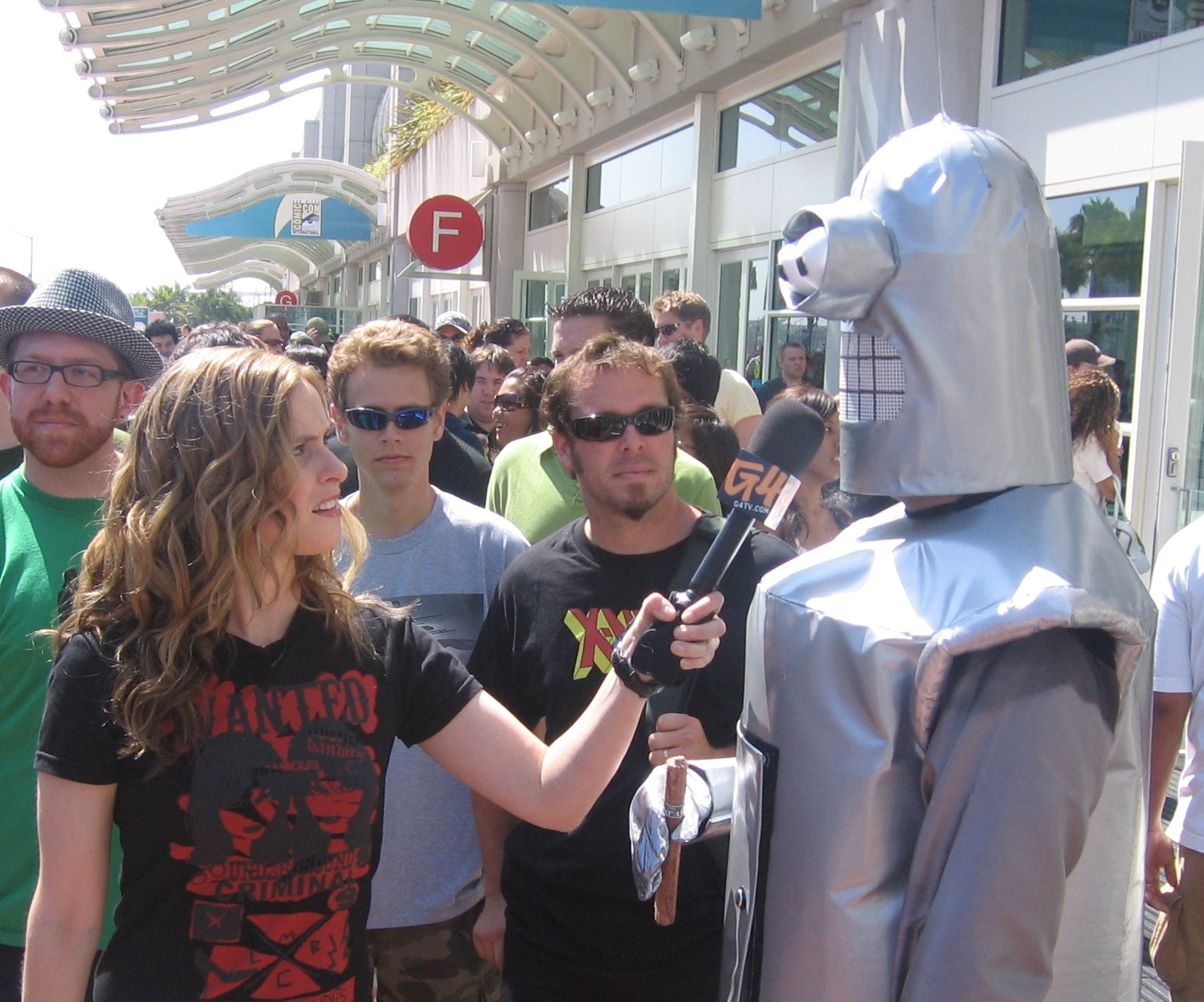
Blair Butler interviews a cosplayer of the character Bender, from the animated TV show Futurama.

Butler has an online segment on the G4 website called "Geek Out" where she examines various things from geek culture.

She co-hosted X-Play on certain weeks when one of the co-hosts was absent:

- Filled in for Adam Sessler as co-host for X-Play for the week of May 22, 2006.
- Filled in for Morgan Webb as co-host for X-Play for the weeks of August 28, 2006, and September 4, 2006. While Webb was absent, Butler reviewed games in addition to co-hosting. She hosted the show's birthday special for Adam Sessler during this period.
- Filled in for Olivia Munn as co-host for Attack of the Show on January 31, 2008, February 27, 2008, and April 23, 2009. Filled in for Kevin Pereira as co-host for Attack of the Show on January 16, 2009. Co-hosted various other times.

Blair appeared on the cover of Booster Gold #23 published by DC Comics.

During the holidays, Butler was a regular host on G4's podcast "Around the Net" which showcases videos from the internet. In December 2012, Butler announced she had been let go by G4.

Blair was the writer of Microsoft's "Xbox @ E3 Live" coverage, which streamed on Xbox Live nightly from June 11, 2013, through June 13, 2013. She was also featured in a day one segment interviewing Hideo Kojima for the upcoming Metal Gear Solid V: The Phantom Pain. The three-day specials reunited her with former G4 personalities, such as Morgan Webb, Kevin Pereira, Blair Herter, Jessica Chobot and Tina Summerford.

In July 2013, Blair hosted Marvel's Earth's Mightiest Show, an original video series spotlighting movies, comics, science, video games and news from Marvel Entertainment.

Most recently she has been the editorial producer of Talking Dead, the Chris Hardwick-hosted talk show that follows every episode of the zombie series Walking Dead on the AMC cable network.

Blair is credited as writing the episode "Viaticum" of the Hulu series Helstrom, which is based on Marvel Comics characters.

Butler wrote the horror films Polaroid (2019), The Invitation (2022) and Until Dawn (2025).

== Filmography ==
Film

Year	Title	Notes	Ref
2018	Hell Fest		
2019	Polaroid		
2022	The Invitation		
2025	Until Dawn	Story by: Blair Butler and Gary Dauberman	
