= Until Dawn: Rush of Blood =

2016 video game

- PAL version cover art
- Developer: Supermassive Games
- Publisher: Sony Interactive Entertainment
- Composer: Jason Graves
- Engine: Decima
- Platform: PlayStation 4
- Release: WW: 13 October 2016
- Genre: Rail shooter
- Mode: Single-player

Until Dawn: Rush of Blood is a virtual reality rail shooter game developed by Supermassive Games and published by Sony Interactive Entertainment, released on 13 October 2016 worldwide for PlayStation VR headset on PlayStation 4. It is a direct spin-off from Until Dawn and features the player riding a horror-themed roller coaster while shooting at inanimate objects and live enemies.

== Gameplay ==
The game is a direct spin-off from Until Dawn. The player plays on a roller coaster cart while going through a horror-themed carnival amusement park which grows more intense as the player progresses through the game. The game features seven different roller coasters that feature some of the same locations and characters from its brethren although with different themes, and are quickly loaded by default with handguns, although other weapons are available.

== Plot ==
The player begins at a carnival where an operator, Dan T. (a play on the name Dante), instructs the player on how to handle the upcoming level. As the player is about to finish the level, the Psycho appears and changes the tracks, which causes the player to end up in a lodge, where they are attacked by the psycho and his minions. Before the player can escape the lodge, the Psycho forces the player to inhale gas which knocks the player out.

After waking up, Dan T. informs the player that the gas will cause the player to see things that aren't really there, which is proven when a giant Psycho emerges at the end of the second level and 'eats' the player character. After defeating a ghost in a hotel, the player confronts the Psycho in a sanitorium and kills him in an explosion. The player also kills a giant spider and escapes the Wendigos (the main antagonists from the first game). All the while, the player will hallucinate visions of two girls who call out to them.

Eventually, the player ends up in a hellish cavern, where the player confronts Dan T., now a horrific man-eating beast. The player is able to avoid Dan T.'s attacks long enough to send him in a lava pit, but Dan T. is able to grab the Player and drags them down with him.

As the player finishes each level, a sequence in the real world is shown where the player character is being taken care of by Dan T. in a hospital, and after finishing the final level, Dan T. informs the player that he may need to try the procedure a few more times.

If the player finishes the game on Psychotic difficulty, a scene from Until Dawn is shown where two people find the player eating flesh from a corpse. The scene is shown from the point of view of the player, confirming that the player character is actually Joshua Washington from Until Dawn. The game takes place inside of his mind, as supported by all the strange apparitions – including his twin sisters Hannah and Beth, who call out his name and who have appeared several times throughout the game.

Given that many of the sights and elements throughout the game originate from the events of Until Dawn, the game likely takes place in Josh's mind following him being spared by the Wendigo-transformed Hannah. With the first carnival level likely being a coping mechanism, his underlying knowledge of his guilt breaches in the form of the Psycho, who gasses him the same way Josh gassed his friends. In the second level the resurgence of the nightmares takes full effect as he recalls the swine slaughterhouse and the dollhouse, the former he hallucinates and the latter being part of his tricks on his friends; in the third stage he recounts the hidden hotel under the cabin, also hallucinating the banshee ghost he made to further scare the group. The fourth level has him relive the abandoned asylum, where he finally confronts his alter ego, destroying the Psycho and the asylum with him.

Even with his persona dead, the cascading madness begins to affect him further when he imagines the abandoned mill alongside his presumed fear of spiders. Forced to seek out the greatest source of his madness, Josh then enters the mountain, where he traverses the horror of the old mines, facing the Wendigos in a shaft down to the heart of the mountain (though he likely isn't aware that they were real). In the heart he confronts the beast and faces his "punisher" in a final battle; though Dan T. manages to bring him down with him, the monster dies before Josh does, giving Josh victory at last (the doctor possibly symbolizes Josh having to relive the nightmare to condition himself into fully overcoming his madness). Tragically, his victory is undone in the main game when he gives into hunger and devours The Stranger, giving into the Wendigo Spirit and becoming the monster he believed he imagined.

== Development ==
After the successful release of Until Dawn, Until Dawn: Rush of Blood was rumoured to be in development in October 2015, and was fully announced as a title for the PlayStation VR in November. It was also announced in December that the game was also developed using the Decima game engine that was modified with Havok physics from Until Dawn, and was previewed at PlayStation Experience the same month.

== Reception ==
Reception

Aggregate score
| Aggregator | Score |
|---|---|
| Metacritic | 72/100 |

Review scores
| Publication | Score |
|---|---|
| Computer Games Magazine | 9/10 |
| Destructoid | 7.5/10 |
| Game Informer | 7/10 |
| GameSpot | 5/10 |
| GamesRadar+ | 4/5 |
| IGN | 6/10 |
| PlayStation Official Magazine – Australia | 7/10 |
| PlayStation Official Magazine – UK | 6/10 |
| Road to VR | 6/10 |

Until Dawn: Rush of Blood received "mixed or average reviews", according to the review aggregator platform Metacritic. Critics praised the game's atmosphere, but criticized the short length and the repetitive nature of the game. IGN criticized the game for "failing to deliver anything new or remarkably exciting" but mentioned that the shooting mechanics were simple and well responsive. GameSpot faults the game of its predictable frights, short length and dumb enemies but praised the game's visuals. GamesRadar+ praised the horror atmosphere of Rush of Blood, writing, "The scares spread across the seven levels are masterful. As was evident from the original game, Supermassive has done its horror homework".

Destructoid liked the use of the PlayStation Move controllers throughout the game, feeling they made the gunplay more engaging, "Good luck trying to wrap your brain around aiming at two different sections of the screen at once, which provides a new challenge that you can't really replicate with a standard controller". Game Informer noted that the game could make players nauseous on roller coaster segments and didn't evolve the light gun genre meaningfully, "it doesn't do anything bold or particularly innovative in the world of game design".

== Sequel ==
On 2 November 2022; it was announced that a spiritual sequel to the game called The Dark Pictures: Switchback VR and will be released as part of The Dark Pictures Anthology. Described as a "fast-paced roller coaster action-horror shooter where every move you make, and everything you see, could mean the difference between life and death." It was released on 16 March 2023 along with several other VR games as part of Sony's PS VR2's launch line-up.
