= The Inpatient =

2018 video game

- Developer: Supermassive Games
- Publisher: Sony Interactive Entertainment
- Director: Nik Bowen
- Producer: Andy Nuttall
- Designers: Steve Goss; Wayne Garland
- Programmers: Prasanna Jeganathan; David Harvey
- Artist: Ian Palmer
- Writers: Larry Fessenden; Graham Reznick
- Engine: Unreal Engine 4
- Platform: PlayStation 4
- Release: NA: 23 January 2018; EU: 24 January 2018
- Genre: Survival horror
- Mode: Single-player

The Inpatient is a 2018 survival horror video game developed by Supermassive Games and published by Sony Interactive Entertainment for the PlayStation 4. The game was released in January 2018 for the virtual reality headset PlayStation VR.

It is a prequel to the 2015 game Until Dawn, taking place at the Blackwood Sanatorium in 1952, 63 years before the events of the original game. Unlike Until Dawn, it uses a first-person perspective.

== Gameplay ==
The Inpatient is a survival horror game played from a first-person perspective. The player controls a patient suffering from amnesia within the Blackwood Sanatorium in 1952 during the aftermath of a mine collapse, with the intent on reclaiming their memories. Non-player characters are caused to react via voice recognition. The outcome of the story is entirely consequent upon the decisions that are made.

== Plot ==
The controlled character awakens in a restraining chair, greeted by Jefferson Bragg. He tells them that their memory is weak, and he wants them to try remembering the last thing you see — despite best efforts, all they can remember is hiding in a small closet and being found by an unknown man, and that the year is 1952. He then has an employee take them to their room, who informs them that they are a patient in the Blackwood Sanitarium.

The next morning, the protagonist gets a new roommate, Gordon or Ana (their gender is the same as the player character's). As days go by, the roommate's sanity gradually decreases, as there is chaos heard outside the cell and they are starving. Eventually, the protagonist manages to break free and explore the seemingly abandoned and rundown sanitarium. They come across some employees and a priest, and possibly their roommate, who have discovered the events are the cause of the Wendigo uprising. They make an attempt to get off the mountain, but Bragg refuses to come along, staying behind to commit suicide. Their travel to the cable cars off the mountain is met with Wendigos and police officers who are ordered to silence anyone present. Once the team makes it to the cable cars, either the roommate or the protagonist is revealed to have eaten human flesh and become a Wendigo. In their last moments of humanity, they may sacrifice themselves to stay behind and operate the cable car, or become rogue and kill the others.

If the roommate becomes the Wendigo and the protagonist made it off the mountain, they are shown being interrogated by a police officer, who intimidates them to be quiet of the events that happened. If the protagonist became the Wendigo, the epilogue screen will show the year turning to 2014. Hannah and Beth Washington are seen through the eyes of the Wendigo, which then starts chasing the girls.

== Development ==
The developer of The Inpatient is Supermassive Games, who uses the Unreal Engine 4 in its creation. The game acts as a prequel to 2015's Until Dawn, set inside the Blackwood Sanatorium, 63 years prior to the events of the original. Nik Bowen, Graham Reznick and Larry Fessenden returned as director and writers, respectively. In order to subconsciously draw players into the story, Supermassive Games employed elements of psychological horror, which included them rendering three-dimensional binaural audio to supplement the visuals.

== Release ==
It was announced with a teaser trailer at E3 2017, set to be released as a PlayStation 4 exclusive with support for PlayStation VR on 21 November 2017 in North America and 22 November in Europe. It was later delayed to 23 January 2018 in North America and 24 January in Europe.

== Reception ==
Reception

Aggregate score
Aggregator	Score
Metacritic	59/100

Review scores
Publication	Score
Destructoid	6.5/10
Game Informer	6.5/10
GameSpot	8/10
GamesRadar+	3.5/5

The Inpatient received polarized reviews from professional gaming critics, earning a "mixed or average" score of 59 on review aggregation website Metacritic based on 55 reviews. Common praise was aimed at the game's presentation and atmosphere, while the game's slow pace and a lack of diversity in gameplay was often cited as a negative.

The game was nominated for "Sound Design" at the 2018 Develop Awards, for "Best Audio Design" and "Visual Design" at The Independent Game Developers' Association Awards 2018, and for "Control Design, VR", "Direction in Virtual Reality", and "Sound Mixing in Virtual Reality" at the National Academy of Video Game Trade Reviewers Awards.
