= Start the Party! =

2010 video game

- North American box art
- Developer: Supermassive Games
- Publisher: Sony Computer Entertainment
- Engine: Gamebryo
- Platform: PlayStation 3
- Release: EU: 15 September 2010; AU: 16 September 2010; NA/UK: 17 September 2010
- Genre: Party
- Modes: Single-player, multiplayer

Start the Party! is a 2010 augmented reality party video game developed by Supermassive Games and published by Sony Computer Entertainment for the PlayStation 3. It utilizes the PlayStation Move controller. It is the first game developed by Supermassive Games. The game is a collection of augmented reality mini-games which use the PlayStation Eye.

== Gameplay ==
Gameplay of one of the mini-games. Notice how the camera is used as the game's background

Start the Party first snaps a picture of the players using the PlayStation Eye, then displays a real time video feed of players their surroundings in the game. The game consists of a wide variety of mini-games, including bug-swatting and painting games, played using the PlayStation Move motion controller. In the game display, the controller often transforms into animated objects similar to the film Who Framed Roger Rabbit which features real-life people holding cartoon-like objects. The controller can transform into a variety of things depending on the game such as a cartoon tennis racket for swatting bugs, a spiky prod for popping balloons which are shown in the game as being held by the player. The game also allows for multiplayer modes with up to four different players with the use of a single PlayStation Move controller.

== Reception ==
Start the Party!

Aggregate score
Aggregator	Score
Metacritic	55/100

Review scores
Publication	Score
Edge	5/10
Eurogamer	6/10
Famitsu	27/40
Game Informer	6/10
GameRevolution	D
GameSpot	6.5/10
GameTrailers	6/10
IGN	6/10
Joystiq	3/5
PlayStation: The Official Magazine	5/10
Push Square	6/10
The Telegraph	6/10
Metro	4/10

Start the Party received "mixed or average" reviews, according to the review aggregation website Metacritic. In Japan, where the game was ported for release under the name Move de Party (Moveでパーティ, Move de Pātī) on 18 November 2010, Famitsu gave it a score of two sevens, one six, and one seven for a total of 27 out of 40.

== Sequel ==
Start the Party! Save the World
- Developer: Supermassive Games
- Publisher: Sony Computer Entertainment
- Platform: PlayStation 3
- Release: AU: 24 November 2011; EU: 25 November 2011; NA: 6 March 2012
- Genres: Party game, augmented reality
- Modes: Single-player, multiplayer

A sequel, titled Start the Party! Save the World, was released for retail in Australia on 24 November 2011, and in Europe the next day; and as a downloadable game for PlayStation 3 through PlayStation Network on 6 March 2012. In the game, the player (and up to three other players) is cast as a superhero, tasked with saving the world.

=== Reception ===
Start the Party! Save the World

Aggregate score
Aggregator	Score
Metacritic	50/100

Review scores
Publication	Score
GamesMaster	72%
PlayStation Official Magazine – Australia	5/10
PlayStation Official Magazine – UK	5/10
Push Square	4/10

Start the Party! Save the World received "mixed or average" reviews, according to the review aggregation website Metacritic.

== See also ==
- Invizimals
- The Fight: Lights Out
