= Code 8: Part II =

2024 Canadian film by Jeff Chan

- Release poster
- Directed by: Jeff Chan
- Written by: Chris Paré; Jeff Chan; Sherren Lee; Jesse LaVercombe
- Produced by: Jeff Chan; Robbie Amell; Stephen Amell; Chris Paré
- Starring: Robbie Amell; Stephen Amell; Sirena Gulamgaus; Altair Vincent; Alex Mallari Jr.; Moe Jeudy-Lamour; Aaron Abrams; Jean Yoon
- Cinematography: Marie Davignon
- Music by: Ryan Taubert
- Production companies: XYZ Films; Collective Pictures
- Distributed by: Netflix
- Release date: February 28, 2024
- Running time: 100 minutes
- Country: Canada
- Language: English

Code 8: Part II is a 2024 Canadian superhero science fiction action film directed by Jeff Chan, who co-wrote the screenplay with Chris Paré, Sherren Lee and Jesse LaVercombe. It is a sequel to the 2019 film Code 8. Robbie Amell and Stephen Amell reprise their roles from the original film as Connor Reed and Garrett Kelton, respectively; Sirena Gulamgaus, Altair Vincent, Alex Mallari Jr., Moe Jeudy-Lamour, Aaron Abrams, and Jean Yoon also star, with Abrams and Mallari reprising their roles from the original film.

Code 8: Part II was released on Netflix on February 28, 2024.

== Plot ==
Five years following the events of Code 8, the LCPD has reformed their militarized tech program, replacing the majority of their armed humanoid robots, or Guardians, with non-lethal companion K9 robots, similar to dogs. Under the leadership of Sergeant "King" Kingston, the project has been a success and the streets have never been safer.

Having just got out of prison, Connor works as a janitor at a youth community center, run by Mina. There, he keeps his head down and tries to stay out of trouble, leaving his past behind.

Connor's former colleague, a telekinetic criminal named Garrett Kelton has taken control of an apartment complex called Towers where he runs his "ethical" drug empire, paying powered people for their spinal fluid to make the drug Psyke. Among the residents of this community are Pavani "Pav" Gilani and her older brother Tarak, a criminal with the power of camouflage, who works for Connor as a Psyke runner, while trying to protect Pav.

Tarak's desperation leads him to steal a bag of cash from Garrett’s gang, Tarak gets caught by King and his unit of corrupt cops, who are being paid off by Garrett. To cover it up, King orders a K9 unit to hunt him down, killing and injecting him with Psyke to make it look like an overdose. Pav witnesses the murder, and using her rare ability, she causes the robotic K9 to malfunction and escapes.

Pav finds refuge at the community center, where Connor and Mina help her stay hidden from the LCPD. Connor seeks out Garrett’s help to broker a peace deal, which includes wiping Pav’s memory of the murder. But when Connor realizes the mind wiper is erasing every single memory she has of Tarak, he fights to break her free.

Turning to Mina, they attempt to flee the city together but get ambushed by Garrett and his crew. During a tense standoff between Connor and Garrett, King deploys robotic Guardians and orders them to kill everyone on site. Mina sacrifices herself so Connor, Pav, and Garrett can escape.

Detective Davis tracks them down and they learn that the only way to expose King for his crime is by breaking into his home and steal his K9 unit, which holds evidence of Tarak’s murder in its memory. After stealing the K9, Connor, Garrett and Pav escape to the Towers. Here, Garrett turns the tables on them, wanting to use the K9 as leverage to hold King and his officers at bay.

King and the officers surround the Towers and ambush the group after Garrett fails to broker a new deal. Garrett's co-workers let Connor and Pav escape while they stall the cops. A lone K9 goes after them and after a failed electric attack from Connor, Pav unlocks her full power and manages to turn it against the cops. Once outside, they are in a final standoff. Garrett holds off a K9 and King himself until Pav finally manages to broadcast the recordings from King's personal K9, bringing justice for Pav's brother's death.

Three months later, King is arrested and the K9 program is shelved for further inspection. Garrett is in prison and Connor has managed to start up the youth community center with Pav in Mina's honor. While imprisoned, Garrett sees a story about the investigation into government corruption and a new unknown source of Psyke flowing into the city.

== Cast ==
- Robbie Amell as Connor Reed
- Stephen Amell as Garrett Kelton
- Sirena Gulamgaus as Pavani Gilani
- Altair Vincent as Officer Stillman
- Alex Mallari Jr. as Sergeant "King" Kingston
- Moe Jeudy-Lamour as Officer Cirelli
- Aaron Abrams as Officer Davis
- Nneka Elliott as Nadine
- Jean Yoon as Mina Seok
- Sarena Parmar as Stephanie Kingston
- Darrin Maharaj as News Anchor
- Kari Matchett as Mary Reed

== Production ==
The film is a sequel to the 2019 film Code 8 and was also produced/directed by Jeff Chan.

On June 1, 2021, it was announced Robbie Amell and Stephen Amell would produce the sequel and reprise their roles from the original film.

Principal photography was scheduled to begin in Toronto in October 2021. Cast members confirmed filming had begun in November 2021, with Amell teasing the possibility of Code 8: Part III.

Ryan Taubert has returned to score the film sequel.

== Release ==
On June 14, Ted Sarandos announced Netflix had acquired the rights to the feature film.

Code 8: Part II was released on Netflix on February 28, 2024.

== Reception ==
On the review aggregator website Rotten Tomatoes, 73% of 15 critics' reviews are positive, with an average rating of 6.4/10.

Marya E. Gates of RogerEbert.com gave the film two and a half out of four stars and wrote, "Unfortunately, where the first film found a healthy balance between its heist plot and the human moments between Connor and his mother, Part II can't seem to find the time to actually sit with these characters so that we care about them and the lives they are trying to lead in spite of all this heavy policing. Every conversation is in service of another plot point here, a piece of exposition there. The cousins do their best to add depth to the proceedings but are just not given enough time to let their characters breathe."

Chan received a nomination for the DGC Award for Best Direction in a Feature Film.
