= Collective Pictures =

Canadian film company

- Company type: Private
- Industry: Film production
- Founded: 2010
- Founder: Jeff Chan
- Headquarters: Toronto, Ontario, Canada
- Key people: Jeff Chan (President)
- Website: collective.ca

Collective Pictures is a Canadian production company founded in 2010 by Jeff Chan and based in Toronto, Ontario, Canada.

Notable work includes the Code 8 sci-fi film franchise and the romantic drama Float. Collective was formerly known as Colony Pictures.

== History ==
Chan, one of Playback‘s “5 to Watch” in 2014, rose to prominence after creating the viral Activision short film Find Makarov. Activision initially threatened to sue Chan because fans believed a new version of the game was being released. But after seeing the strong audience response, Activision hired him to create its first and only short film for Call of Duty: Modern Warfare III, entitled Find Makarov: Operation Kingsfish.

=== Code 8 Franchise ===
Collective Pictures released a 10-minute short film entitled Code 8 on YouTube in March 2016. Centred around the 4% of people living in fictional Lincoln City who possess special abilities, the sci-fi fantasy stressed individual power over technological superiority and military authority. The short has accumulated over 6.9 million views as of January 2024.

The short acted as a teaser for the potential feature film. An Indiegogo fundraising campaign, spearheaded by Collective, Robbie Amell, and Stephen Amell, asking for $200,000 was launched on March 23, 2016. The campaign reached its goal within 36 hours and reached $2.4 million by April 24, 2016. Fundraising closed with $3.4 million on December 31, 2019, with the continued campaign helping recover costs of DVD pressings and the distribution to contributors of perks, wardrobe and props from the production. A four-minute segment of the film's closing credits shows a list of only some of the 30,810 contributors to the fundraising campaign. The first announcement of additional cast came on June 12, 2017, when Laysla De Oliveira joined the film.

Code 8 set the record for the highest grossing day-and-date release for Elevation Pictures in Canada and Vertical Entertainment in the U.S., eventually earning $5 million in VOD revenue through Apple, Amazon and Vudu. The film, also financed by Telefilm and U.K. based Fyzz Facility, reached No. 1 on Netflix's Top 10 list in the U.S., France, Australia, UK, Mexico and Brazil. Following Code 8's success, a sequel was announced in June 2021.

On June 1, 2021, it was announced Robbie Amell and Stephen Amell would produce the sequel alongside Collective and reprise their roles from the original film. On June 14, Ted Sarandos announced Netflix had acquired the rights to the feature film and would release it exclusively to their platform. Filming was scheduled to begin in Toronto in October 2021. Cast members confirmed filming had begun in November 2021, with Amell teasing the possibility of Code 8: Part III. Code 8: Part II began filming in the fourth quarter of 2021 and was released February 28, 2024 on Netflix.

=== Other projects ===
In September 2020, it was announced that Wattpad and Collective Pictures would team up to develop Float, a film based on the story written by Kate Marchant on the Wattpad social storytelling platform. The film, directed by Sherren Lee, was released on February 9, 2024.

== Crowdfunding ==
Collective raised $2.4 million CAD (US$1.1 million) from more than 30,000 supporters for Code 8 (2016) on the crowdfunding site Indiegogo. This far exceeded its initial $200,000 goal, making it the largest-ever crowdfunded campaign for a Canadian film on any crowdfunding platform.

== Filmography ==
Film Year	Film title	Director	Notes
2016	Code 8 (short film)	Jeff Chan	distributed by YouTube
2019	Code 8	Jeff Chan	distributed by Vertical Entertainment
2024	Float	Sherren Lee	distributed by Lionsgate Films and Elevation Pictures
2024	Code 8: Part II	Jeff Chan	distributed by Netflix and XYZ Films
