= Amell =

Amell is a surname. Notable people with the surname include:

- Robbie Amell (born 1988), Canadian actor and model
- Stephen Amell (born 1981), Canadian actor
