= Code 8 =

Code 8 may refer to:

- Code 8 (2016 film), a 2016 science fiction short film
- Code 8 (2019 film), a 2019 science fiction film based on the short film
