= Alex Mallari Jr. =

Canadian actor (born 1988)

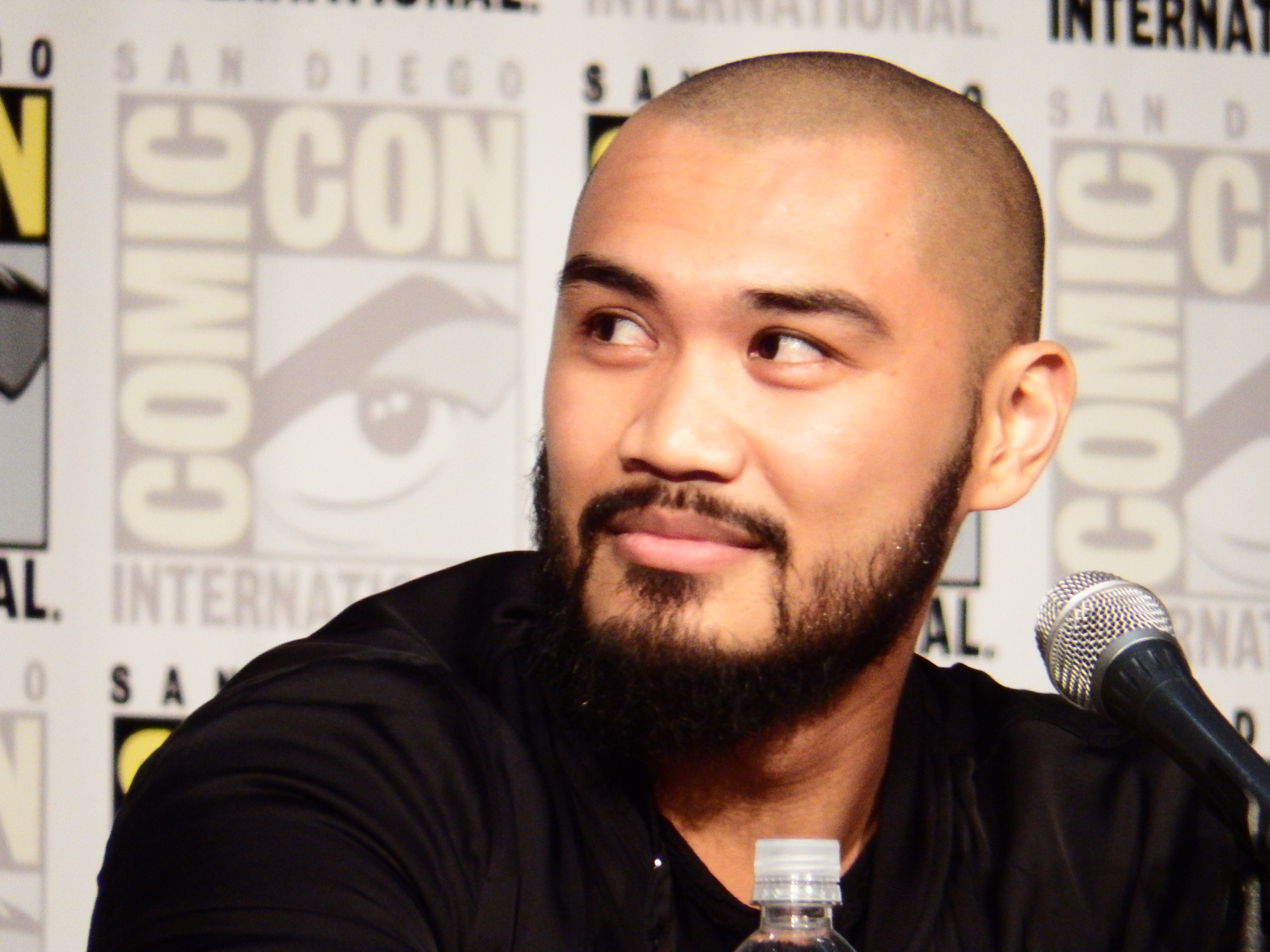
- Mallari at San Diego Comic-Con in July 2016
- Born: February 19, 1988 (age 38); Philippines
- Occupation: Actor
- Years active: 2009–present
- Partner: Ashley Snook (2019–present)
- Children: 2

Alex Mallari Jr. (born 19 February 1988) is a Filipino and Canadian actor. He is known for his performances in the television series Dark Matter (2015–2017), feature film The Adam Project, Code 8: Part II and the series Ginny & Georgia (2021–present).

== Life and career ==
Mallari was born on February 19, 1988, in the Philippines, but was raised in the Toronto, Canada suburb of Scarborough. Mallari was competitive at a national level in Taekwondo, for which he has a third-degree black belt. He was twice a Junior Canadian National Taekwondo champion. He gave that up when he was at the age of 13. He then took up basketball with the intention of turning professional but an injury prevented him from pursuing that profession.

While attending the University of Toronto, Mallari decided to pursue acting. His first notable acting role was as Four in the Syfy television series Dark Matter, based on the comic book series of the same name. He starred on the series from 2015 to 2017, for three seasons.

He has since starred in several films and televisions series, including the Netflix feature film The Adam Project, and the Netflix series Ginny & Georgia (2021–present).

== Credits ==
=== Film ===
Year	Title	Role	Notes
2010	Dead Genesis	Mickey	
2010	A Dance for Grace	Main Dancer	(as Alex)
2014	RoboCop	Young Lieutenant	
2014	Debug	First Mate	
2015	Pay the Ghost	EMT	
2019	Code 8	Kingston	
2022	The Adam Project	Christos	
2022	Shotgun Wedding	Dog-Face	
2022	One Delicious Christmas	Preston Weaver	
2024	Morningside	Josh	
2024	Code 8: Part II	Sergeant “King” Kingston	
2025	Recipe for Romance	Gabe	Television film
2026	Mayday	Danny "Longshot" Bowers	

=== Television ===
Year	Title	Role	Notes
2009	Cold Blood	Kosoul Chanthakoummane	(TV series documentary)
2010–2011	True Justice	Hiro	
2011	Nikita	Guard Valdez	
2012	Cybergeddon	Winston Chang	
2012	Cybergeddon Zips	Winston	
2012	The L.A. Complex	Chris	
2013	Played	Luke	
2013	Beauty and the Beast	Bustamonte #2	
2014	The Strain	Carlo	
2014	Remedy	EMS Guy	
2014	Defiance: The Lost Ones	Lone Drinker	
2015–2017	Dark Matter	Four / Ryo Tetsudo / Ryo Ishida	
2016	Designated Survivor	Chief Edward Marino	
2016	Conviction	Matty Tan	
2016	Insomnia	Ken	
2018–2019	Shadowhunters	Detective Greer	3 episodes (season 3)
2019	Jett	Taggart	
2020–2022	Workin' Moms	Malcolm Cody Patrick	15 episodes
2020	Coroner	Mal	3 episodes
2020	Letterkenny	Matty	1 episode
2020	Transplant	Sully	Episode #2.1
2021–present	Ginny & Georgia	PI Gabriel Cordova	Recurring role, 16 episodes
2023	The Way Home	Dr. Andy	Recurring role

=== Video games ===
Year	Title	Role	Notes
2019	Tom Clancy's Ghost Recon Breakpoint	Anthony "Nomad" Perryman	Replaced Joseph May
2021	The Dark Pictures Anthology: House of Ashes	Corporal Nathan Merwin	
