= Prince Amponsah (actor) =

Canadian actor

Prince Amponsah is a Canadian actor.

== Background ==
In November 2012, he was injured in an apartment fire, losing both of his arms near the elbow and spending several weeks in a coma, and he went through a year and a half of regular surgery and rehabilitation. He underwent 40 skin graft procedures and other reconstructive surgeries. For weeks after the fire, he lay in the burn unit of Sunnybrook Hospital in a coma, which was medically induced, unaware that he had suffered burns to 68 percent of his body.

== Career ==
Amponsah began his acting career with stage roles at the Shaw Festival in the early 2010s. He returned to the stage in the latter half of the 2010s, beginning with a 2016 production of Brandon Crone's play Contempt.

In 2017 he appeared in a production of Salvatore Antonio's Sheets, in a role which called for him to appear on stage in the nude. In the same year he appeared in two third-season episodes of Killjoys as Havigan, the proprietor of a hackmod bar, and starred in Sherren Lee's award-winning short film The Things You Think I'm Thinking.

In 2018, he was profiled in Jamie Miller's short documentary film Prince's Tale, and played a leading role in a production of Judith Thompson's play After the Blackout. In this era he also had guest roles in the television series Frankie Drake Mysteries, The Handmaid's Tale and Private Eyes.

In 2021 he appeared as August, a member of the Traveling Symphony, in the television miniseries Station Eleven, and performed in "Emmett", Syrus Marcus Ware's contribution to the 21 Black Futures project.

In 2022 he had a recurring role as Marvin in the web series Avocado Toast, for which he received a Canadian Screen Award nomination for Best Supporting Performance in a Web Series at the 11th Canadian Screen Awards in 2023. His role in the series was hailed as a positive step forward for representation of people with disabilities, as his disability was narratively acknowledged but not dwelled upon as the defining aspect of his character's story.

In July 2025, it was announced that Amponsah will play the lead in How Dare You, a forthcoming horror comedy by the filmmaking duo of Kit Redstone and Arran Shearing. Also in 2025, Amponsah appears as Henry Sickler in the Apple TV series The Last Frontier.
