= The Hunters (2013 film) =

- DVD cover
- Genre: Science fantasy; Adventure
- Based on: Mirror Mirror by Joshua Williamson
- Screenplay by: Matthew Huffman; Jeffrey Schechter
- Story by: Matthew Huffman
- Directed by: Nisha Ganatra
- Starring: Robbie Amell; Alexa Vega; Keenan Tracey; Kira Clavell; Michelle Forbes; Victor Garber
- Country of origin: United States
- Original language: English

Production
- Producer: Heather Puttock
- Cinematography: C. Kim Miles
- Editor: Lisa Jane Robison
- Running time: 89 minutes
- Production companies: Arc Entertainment; Raindance Entertainment; Eh-Okay Entertainment Productions

Original release
- Network: Hallmark Channel
- Release: October 25, 2013

The Hunters is a 2013 American science fantasy adventure television film directed by Nisha Ganatra from a screenplay by Matthew Huffman and Jeffrey Schechter, based on the graphic novel Mirror Mirror by Joshua Williamson. The film stars Robbie Amell and Alexa Vega. It premiered on the Hallmark Channel on October 25, 2013.

== Synopsis ==
Carter and Jordyn Flynn are not exactly the average mother and father. For them, a typical workday can take place anywhere in the world, raiding ornate museums and evading pursuing authorities as Hunters, protectors of powerful fairytale artifacts that are anything but make-believe. While the Flynns take their jobs seriously, they're just as concerned about the welfare of their two sons, 21-year-old Paxton and 16-year-old Tripp, who are unaware of their parents' true line of work.

When Carter and Jordyn vanish after being double-crossed by Mai, the boys learn the truth about their parents and lineage from Dylan, the Flynns' young assistant. They turn to Mason, an old family friend, but soon discover he's after the enchanted mirror the Flynns were trying to protect. The mirror, with a storied past, is the same one that shaped Snow White's destiny. It becomes evident that it is up to the valiant brothers and Dylan to save the day before very real fairy tale magic falls into Mason’s less-than-worthy hands.

== Cast ==
- Robbie Amell as Paxton Flynn
- Alexa Vega as Dylan Savini
- Victor Garber as Mason Fuller
- Kira Clavell as Mai
- Michelle Forbes as Jordan Flynn
- Dan Payne as Carter Flynn
- Keenan Tracey as Tripp Flynn

== Production ==
The film was shot in Vancouver, British Columbia with additional shooting done in Thailand.
