= Jesse LaVercombe =

Canadian writer and actor

Jesse LaVercombe is a Canadian-American writer and actor. He is known for co-creating and starring in King Gilgamesh & the Man of the Wild, which won a Dora Award, co-writing the feature films Float (2023) and Code 8: Part II (2024), and starring in Violation (2020), for which he won a Toronto ACTRA Award and was nominated for a Canadian Screen Award.

== Education ==
LaVercombe is an alumnus of the National Theatre School of Canada and the Canadian Film Centre.

== Career ==
LaVercombe co-wrote the feature films Float (2023), released by Lionsgate, and Code 8: Part II (2024), released by Netflix. In 2019, he won the Playwrights Guild of Canada's RBC Emerging Playwright Award for his theatrical play Hallelujah, It’s Holly. He co-created and starred in the stage play King Gilgamesh & the Man of the Wild which was performed in Chicago, Minneapolis, New York, Halifax, and Toronto. The musical production, performed with Ahmed Moneka and his five-piece Arabic jazz band, won a Dora Award for Outstanding Sound Design/Composition and received four additional nominations, including Outstanding New Play.

As an actor, LaVercombe won a Toronto ACTRA Award and was nominated for a Canadian Screen Award for Best Supporting Actor at the 2021 CSA awards for his role in Violation (2020), which premiered at the Sundance Film Festival and the Toronto International Film Festival. His other film credits include The Things You Think I'm Thinking (2017), which he also wrote, Queen of the Morning Calm (2019), and Flowers of the Field (2020). He has also made guest appearances in television series, including American Gods, Save Me, The Detail, and a recurring role in Murdoch Mysteries. On stage, LaVercombe has appeared in new plays by writers including Sarah Ruhl and Hannah Moscovitch.

== Film/TV ==
Year	Title	Writer	Actor	Role	Notes
2017	The Things You Think I'm Thinking	Yes	Yes	Caleb	Short Film
2017	Air Crash Investigation	No	Yes	First Officer Chad Erickson	Episode: "Killer Attitude"
2017	Save Me	No	Yes	Plaid Shirt #1	Episode: "Injuries Due to Distracted Walking"
2017	American Gods	No	Yes	Young Night Watchman	Episode: "A Prayer for Mad Sweeney"
2017	Salvation	No	Yes	Corporal Nevins	Episode: "Another Trip Around the Sun"
2018	The Detail	No	Yes	Zach Grayson	Episode: "The Long Walk"
2019	Street Series	No	Yes	Guy on the Bench	Episode: "Summer is Coming"
2019	Queen of the Morning Calm	No	Yes	Sarge	
2019-2022	Murdoch Mysteries	No	Yes	Jack Walker	Recurring role (15 episodes)
2020	Violation	No	Yes	Dylan	Toronto ACTRA Award winner, Canadian Screen Award nominee
2020	Flowers of the Field	No	Yes	Maurice Pratt	
2022	Height Markers	No	Yes	Ted	
2023	Float	Yes	No	—N/a	Co-writer
2024	Code 8: Part II	Yes	No	—N/a	Co-writer

== Theater ==
Year	Title	Writer	Actor	Role	Theater	Notes
2018	Bunny	No	Yes	Angel	Tarragon Theatre	Play by Hannah Moscovitch
2019	King Gilgamesh & the Man of the Wild	Yes	Yes	Enkidu / Jesse	Various	Co-creator & lead; Won Dora Award Premiered 2019, performed 2022, 2023, 2024
2021	Copenhagen	No	Yes	Heisenberg	National Arts Center of Canada	Play by Michael Frayn
2022	Post-Democracy	No	Yes	Lee	Tarragon Theatre	Play by Hannah Moscovitch
2023	Letters from Max	No	Yes	Max Ritvo	Necessary Angel / Theatre Center	Play by Sarah Ruhl; Canadian Premiere
