= The Dark Pictures Anthology: House of Ashes =

2021 video game

- Box art featuring Rachel King, one of the game's five protagonists
- Developer: Supermassive Games
- Publisher: Bandai Namco Entertainment
- Director: Will Doyle
- Producer: Dom Ireland
- Artist: David Hirst
- Writer: Khurrum Rahman
- Composer: Jason Graves
- Series: The Dark Pictures Anthology
- Engine: Unreal Engine 4
- Platforms: PlayStation 4; PlayStation 5; Windows; Xbox One; Xbox Series X/S
- Release: 22 October 2021
- Genres: Interactive drama, survival horror
- Modes: Single-player, multiplayer

The Dark Pictures Anthology: House of Ashes is a 2021 interactive drama and survival horror video game developed by Supermassive Games and published by Bandai Namco Entertainment. It is the third game of The Dark Pictures Anthology. The game features a multilinear plot in which decisions can significantly alter the trajectory of the story and change the relationships between the five playable protagonists; some lead to their permanent deaths. House of Ashes is set during the 2003 invasion of Iraq and follows five characters—four Americans working for the US Armed Forces and one Iraqi Republican Guard—who must escape from an underground Akkadian temple and survive the vampiric creatures that infest the area. Ashley Tisdale, who plays CIA operative Rachel King, was marketed as the game's leading actress. Jason Graves, a long-time collaborator with Supermassive for the series, composed the soundtrack during COVID-19 lockdowns in the United Kingdom.

Reappearing in House of Ashes are staple mechanics of The Dark Pictures Anthology, such as quick time events (QTEs), two single-player and two multiplayer modes, and collectibles that allow players to see visions of possible future events. New features include a more interactive camera system, a handheld light source for easier navigation, and three difficulty levels to manage QTEs. The films Aliens, Predator, and The Descent, as well as the H. P. Lovecraft novella At the Mountains of Madness and the myth of the Curse of Akkad were the main influences for the game. The creatures were made using motion capture and hand animation, and the temple's design was inspired by ancient Mesopotamian architecture. Military specialists and Arabic speakers were consulted to ensure a faithful depiction of the war.

House of Ashes was released for PlayStation 4, PlayStation 5, Windows, Xbox One, and Xbox Series X/S on 22 October 2021, to mixed reviews. Several critics deemed it an improvement from the previous two instalments in the anthology, and points of praise included the replay value, QTE intensity, cinematography, multiplayer modes, and likeability of the Iraqi character. Critiques were directed towards the game's pacing, scare factor, facial animations, texture and animation glitches, and handling of the Iraq War. The fourth game in the series, The Devil in Me, was revealed in a teaser trailer at the end of House of Ashes and released on 18 November 2022.

== Gameplay ==
The Dark Pictures Anthology: House of Ashes is an interactive drama and survival horror game played from a third-person perspective. Player control switches between five protagonists, working for the armed forces of their respective countries during the 2003 invasion of Iraq, who become trapped in an underground ancient Akkadian temple infested by vampiric creatures. Managing the characters' relationships is one of the game's core mechanics; they can be amicable, being courageous and ensuring everyone survives despite their differences, or they can continue alone and be concerned with their personal safety instead. Characters often quote the proverb "the enemy of my enemy is my friend", one of the story's recurring themes.

House of Ashes is the first game in The Dark Pictures Anthology to feature difficulty levels, which affect the game's quick time events (QTEs), another core gameplay feature. Players are given the option to hold rather than mash buttons, and they can give themselves more time to respond to the prompts. Several scenes, including combat-heavy ones, make use of QTEs that can lead to penalties like a protagonist's death if an input is not precisely timed. The game displays a notice whenever a QTE is about to happen, illustrating the type of action the QTE is intended to perform. Some types of QTEs involve pressing specific buttons to trigger actions from the player character, such as dodging an obstacle or keeping calm when hiding from a threat. Another type involves moving a reticle onto a target to shoot it.

Rachel (right) contemplates whether she should abandon an infected Clarice (left). The decisions to help and leave her are shown alongside an illustration of the heart and brain, respectively.

Players often make choices that affect the narrative's progression and the characters' perceptions of each other. There is a limited amount of time in which they can choose an action or a line of dialogue with which to respond, or else say or do nothing when prompted to make a decision. An anatomical drawing of the brain and heart accompanies every choice in House of Ashes, indicating that the player character may choose actions based on rationality or emotion. Their decisions can influence the characters' assigned personality traits, which will sometimes lead to them acting in a different way when not under player control, but the game does not say how each choice will affect the trait.

To track the narrative branches in one playthrough, the game's menu has a system called "bearings", which allows the player to retrospectively view the actions they took that led to the current state of the game. The story is interspersed with discussions with an omnipresent observer called the Curator (Pip Torrens), who returns from the previous games in the Anthology. He talks to the players about the choices they have made and provides clues about what will happen next in the plot. The survival of the main characters depends on player decisions, and the game continues without the deceased characters.

House of Ashes includes elements of exploration and allows players to pick up collectibles while searching and moving through locations. A light source mechanic aids players in underground navigation and inspection by illuminating dark paths that lie ahead. Returning in House of Ashes are "pictures", collectibles that trigger a vision of possible future story branches to help players make decisions. Pictures can have a black, white, or gold frame. (Note: "Black" pictures allude to a possible character death, while "white" pictures foretell an event associated with a positive outcome. A "gold" picture does not show events from the current game but gives premonitions of a scene for the next game in the anthology.) Also in line with earlier games in the series, 50 "secrets"—items that are scattered throughout House of Ashes—provide background information and context to events that happened in the temple and preceded the main plot. Secrets include journal entries that, when retrieved, each activate a cutscene where the author's voice recounts a 1940s archaeology mission that occurred in the temple.

The game features four gameplay modes. The "Theatrical" and "Curator's Cut" modes are single-player, while "Movie Night" and "Shared Story" are multiplayer. Customers who pre-ordered the game gained early access to the "Curator's Cut", a version of the story that shows mostly the same scenes that are viewed from the perspective and control of another protagonist. (Note: In January 2022, the "Curator's Cut" became available for players who purchased but did not pre-order House of Ashes.) "Shared Story" and "Movie Night" offer the option to control the characters with another person; "Shared Story" acts as a two-player version of the game online and "Movie Night" accommodates up to five players in couch co-op.

== Synopsis ==
=== Setting and prologue ===
House of Ashes' plot is set in the former territory of the Akkadian Empire, which existed in Mesopotamia around 4,000 years ago. The prologue takes place in 2231 BC, as a Gutian army prepares to invade the capital Akkad and a solar eclipse allows the vampires beneath the temple to emerge and massacre both armies. Following the prologue, the game cuts to a library owned by the Curator, who introduces himself to the player and provides information about parts of House of Ashes' gameplay, including the decision-making system and the pictures system.

=== Characters ===
The game's five protagonists are Rachel King (Ashley Tisdale), a CIA officer; her husband, U.S. Air Force Lt. Col Eric King (Alex Gravenstein); U.S. Force Recon Marines, Sgt. Nick Kay (Moe Jeudy-Lamour) and 1stLt. Jason Kolchek (Paul Zinno); and Salim Othman (Nick E. Tarabay), a soldier of the Iraqi Republican Guard.

House of Ashes centres around two main character dynamics: Rachel's romantic relationships with Eric and Nick, and Jason's relationship with Salim. After a year apart, Rachel and Eric have grown distant, leading to her affair with Nick, which can cause serious issues between the three throughout the game. Having enlisted after the September 11 attacks, the Islamophobic Jason is searching for his purpose in life, haunted by memories of ordering the shooting of an unarmed civilian at a checkpoint. Salim, a father who wishes to reunite with his son, may help Jason turn their initial animosity into friendship as part of the story's core theme and help Jason overcome his prejudices.

=== Main plot ===
Eric arrives at Camp Slayer in Baghdad along with his assistant, Clarice, to brief a team of Force Recon Marines led by Rachel about a mission to raid a village in the desert. He tells them that there may be a facility underneath the village hiding chemical weapons. Meanwhile, Salim returns home and searches for his son, but his commanding officer, Dar Basri, forces Salim to intercept Eric's raid, headed by Jason. Salim's squad ambushes the Americans on arrival, but sinkholes plunge everyone into the Akkadian temple buried beneath the sand. Clarice is grabbed and taken away by one of the creatures.

The Iraqis and Americans are frequently attacked by the creatures, as well as an undead character from the prologue who became infected by the parasite inside the temple. (Note: The "Ancient One" is one of the two playable characters from the prologue. Which one of them returns as the Ancient One is determined by which one did not die first to the creatures.) Rachel and Jason can catch the infection later in the game. Throughout House of Ashes, the characters learn about the temple's history and of a 1940s British archaeological expedition who were searching for Alexander the Great's tomb, and who perished after encountering the monsters.

Salim, using steel debris from a fallen truck to fight vampires, explores the temple alone as the surviving marines regroup; Rachel is separated from Eric after fighting Dar and falls into a blood-soaked pit. While the US forces search for ways to signal for help, she meets the infected Clarice. Together, the two climb out of the pit, but due to Clarice's worsening state, Rachel must choose whether to abandon her or stay with her in the hope of medicating her illness.

Rachel reunites with her allies in the temple, after which they are assaulted by vampires. The Americans encounter Dar and Salim as they escape to the catacombs below. Salim suggests they unite to fight the monsters, to which the others reluctantly agree. The vampires attack again in the catacombs, separating everyone and killing Dar. After the assault, Salim encounters Jason and proposes to form an alliance. The two explore the temple and go deeper into what is discovered to be an alien spaceship's remains. Nick, and possibly Rachel and Eric, follow and learn about the vampires' origin: this is the site of the crash-landing of a spaceship that carried thousands of large, bat-like aliens, which were controlled by a parasite that gestates within the host's body. The disease caused the aliens to mutate into vampires vulnerable to ultraviolet light; they had been hibernating underground for millennia, occasionally venturing to the surface to feed on their victims' adrenaline.

The survivors find a gigantic nest of hibernating vampires in the spaceship and destroy it. They escape to the surface to await recovery by a rescue team, but a total solar eclipse allows the creatures to attack the group before help arrives. During a post-credits epilogue, the located protagonists are transported to Camp Slayer, where the survivors are interviewed. (Note: During the epilogue, the extraction team may fail to discover Rachel or Salim. Rachel can get confined within a vampire's cocoon if none of the characters are alive to direct the team towards her. Salim can safely return to his son at home if the US troops do not call for close air support, otherwise he will instead be arrested as a POW by the US military.) The US military, planning to cover up the entire incident, begins analyzing the vampires. Salim, if he survives, is either captured by American forces or manages to escape to search for his son.

== Development ==
House of Ashes is the third instalment out of a collection of eight planned for the series. The game includes additional features such as the QTE difficulty levels and a new camera system based on fan feedback. Hoping to make exploration easier and more immersive, the developers opted for a controllable, 360-degree camera as opposed to the fully fixed one from previous entries, which featured less spacious areas than in House of Ashes. Furthermore, after the second game in the anthology, Little Hope (2020), faced backlash for having little variety in its endings, the developers added more narrative branches to House of Ashes' story. Consequently, House of Ashes includes over 60 death scenes.

=== Story and design ===
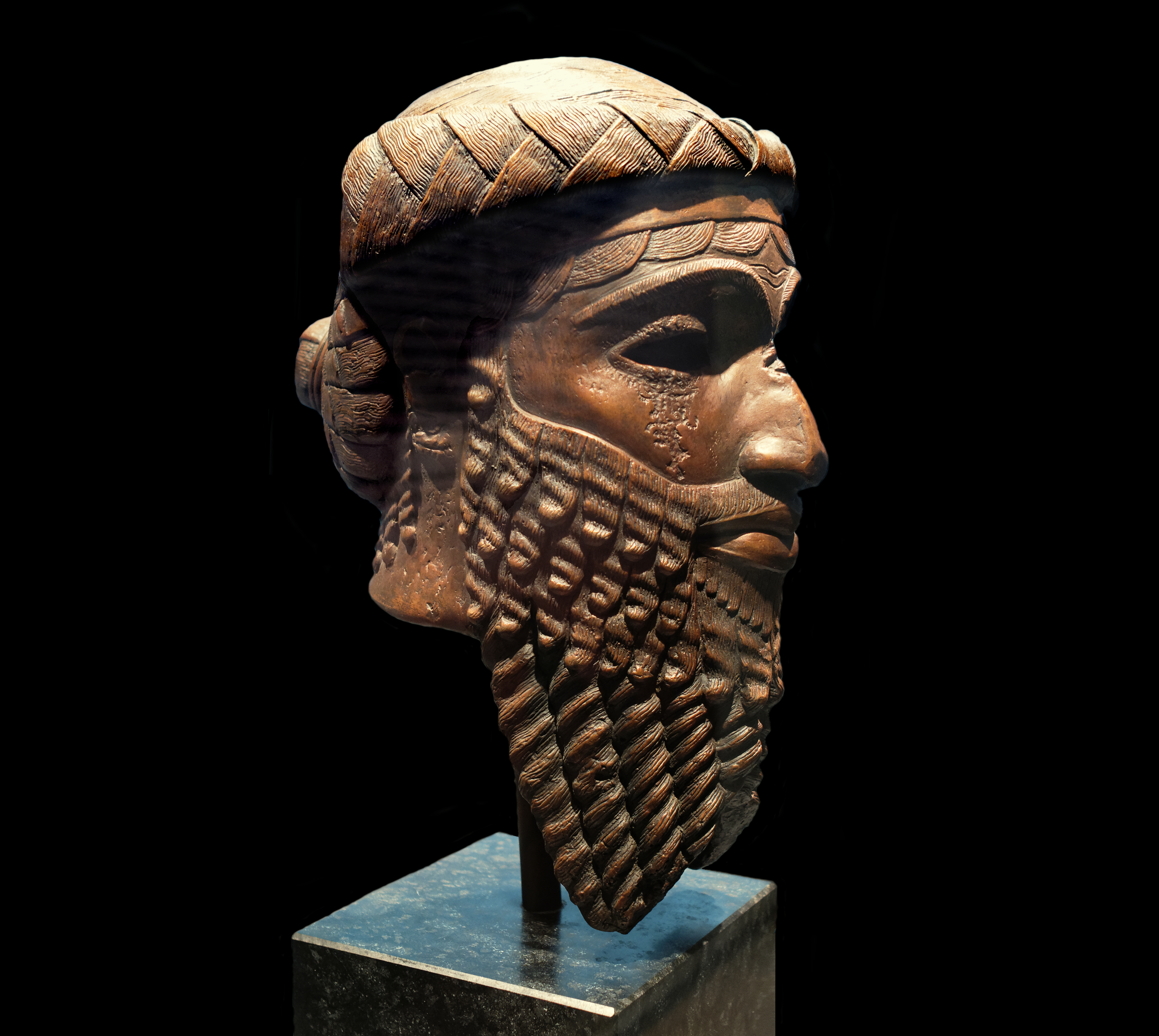
Most of the game is set in Akkad, formerly ruled by the king Naram-Sin (mask pictured). He features prominently in the prologue, which was inspired by the Curse of Akkad.

House of Ashes, like previous entries in the anthology, was designed to be a standalone story, but all of the games are in a shared universe, so Supermassive included easter eggs that refer to other games in the anthology. Character models from House of Ashes' predecessors were reused in the game; the choice reminded Sara Rechena from the Portuguese edition of IGN of the anthology TV series American Horror Story, which reuses actors in different roles across multiple seasons. Inspirations for the story and design included the films Aliens (1986), Predator (1987), and The Descent (2005); the H. P. Lovecraft novella At the Mountains of Madness (1936); and various facets of Mesopotamian culture such as the myth of the Curse of Akkad.

David Hirst oversaw the art team's research into the costume and architecture of Akkad for the game. The House of Ashes temple was inspired by the look of ancient Mesopotamian architecture. Once the temple was created, the team aged it for the scenes set in 2003, collapsing ceilings and pillars and drifting sand into corridors. For the monsters, the developers focused on reflecting their otherworldly nature through their physiology: they were designed faceless so they would appear incomprehensible, unempathetic, and inhumane enough to "bring out the humanity" in the characters. Creating the monsters involved a combination of motion capture and hand animation.

Supermassive attributed the decision to set the game in Iraq to the country's abundance of myths and folklore that the team could incorporate into the story. While they chose the 2003 invasion in particular for the modern day, the developers did not want war and politics to be its primary focus. Nevertheless, they attempted to handle the topic sensitively; Doyle said films about the Iraq War tended to dehumanise Iraqis and Americans alike, so they added an Iraqi playable character for representation and added nuance to the plot. Military specialists and Arabic speakers were consulted during production to ensure the depiction of 2003 Iraq was "grounded in reality" and the plot's script was of good quality. Doyle wanted a story about unity between adversaries to highlight their humanity despite their differences, and he believed that the Iraq War was a good setup for writing conflicts and complex characters that convey this theme.

=== Casting ===
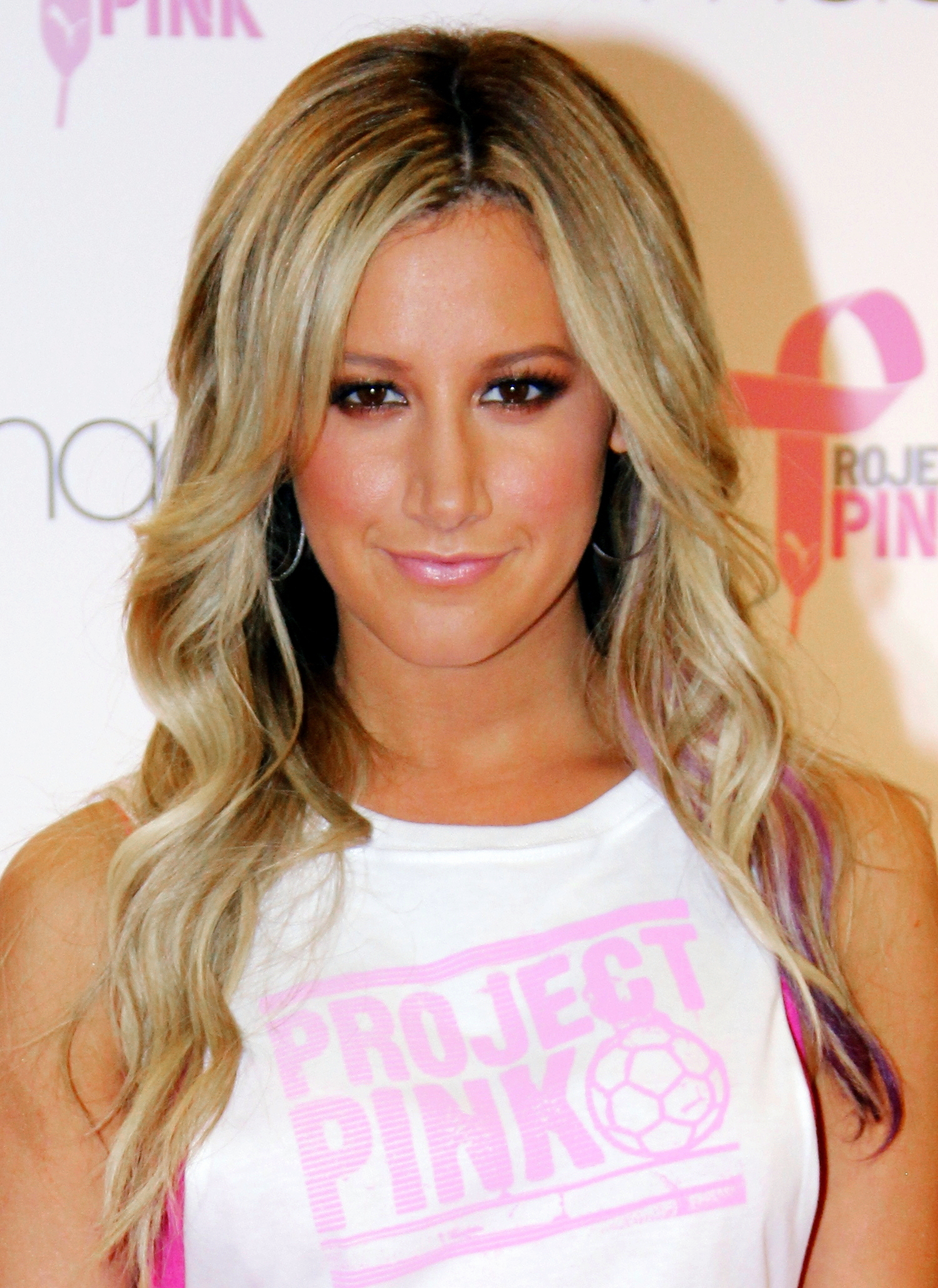
Ashley Tisdale (pictured in 2012), who plays Rachel King, was marketed as the game's leading actress.

For Rachel King, Supermassive wanted to cast someone who could exhibit a "tough" personality but was simultaneously capable of showing a "soft side". They decided that Ashley Tisdale, known for her appearances in the High School Musical franchise, was fit for the role, and they promoted Tisdale and Rachel as the House of Ashes lead. The project expanded her career experience beyond her usual roles in comedy, the reason why Tisdale agreed to provide Rachel's voice and likeness. House of Ashes was her debut as a video game character.

To comply with social distancing protocols during the COVID-19 pandemic, she had to avoid bodily contact with the other actors while having their performances recorded by motion capture. Their movements were digitally edited in post-production to give the impression of contact. In an interview with the developers, Tisdale recounted her experiences while acting for House of Ashes and expressed excitement about her role as a CIA operative in the game:

I'm obsessed with the CIA, and so I was very excited to play a character [like Rachel] because I haven't gotten to do that on TV or movies yet ... I am more known for obviously doing comedy, but this is like, you know what? For me I've always wanted to do an action film, and I am living out my action dreams [acting for the game] because, yes, it is scary, but there's so much action adventure in it, and it's pretty cool—it's pretty wild ... Everyone's really cool; I mean, we all have so much fun and we kind of are just like here kind of killing it.

=== Music and sound design ===
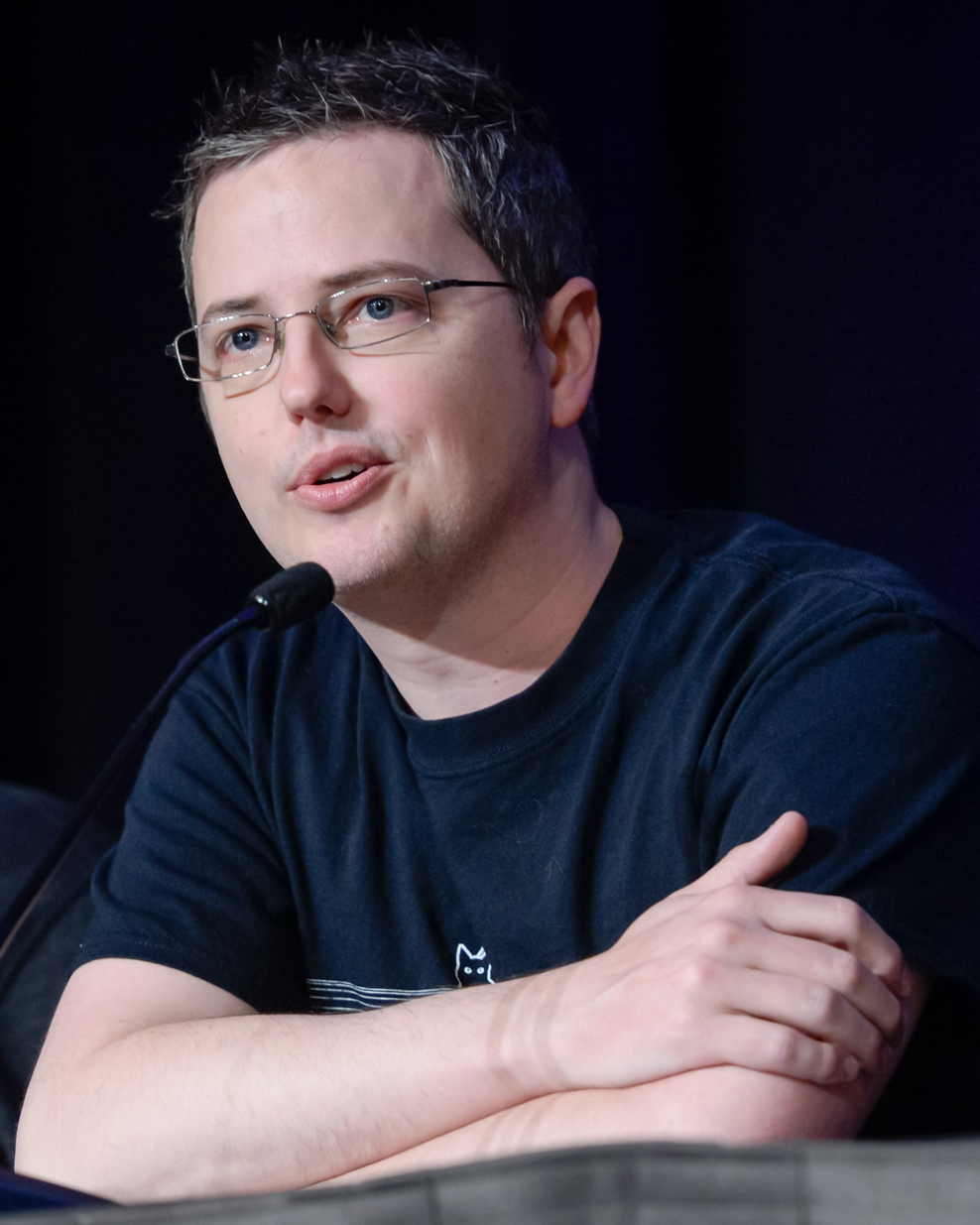
Jason Graves (pictured in 2016) reprises his role as composer for The Dark Pictures Anthology.

The soundtrack was composed by Supermassive Games' long-time collaborator Jason Graves, who previously worked on music for the previous games in The Dark Pictures Anthology. Graves began composing during the early stages of development, which happened to be during the UK's COVID-19 pandemic lockdowns. Comprising the score are string and percussion instruments, including hand drums and distorted guitars, as well as flutes and synthesisers.

Sound director Barney Pratt envisioned a simple, "signature sound" for the game's scores, from which his team could create compositions of varying soundscapes. With this, the soundtrack could encompass a vast range of "time zones, cultures, and locations", as well as convey a wide variety of emotions that ranged from "unnerving" to "dramatic". Graves started working on this sound using a sample of a dove's coo, which he used as the basis for the other arrangements.

Pratt used a combination of film and game music editing techniques to create a cinematic, immersive atmosphere for House of Ashes. His team wanted the score's style to be shaped by the plot and gameplay, so a percussive composition inspired by Sumerian music was used for the game's beginning. Orchestral music with a more "timeless", horror-tinged sound followed for the main plot, and once the game revealed the vampires as part of a scientifically advanced alien civilization, the synthesizers were added to evoke a sense of advanced technology.

=== Release ===
House of Ashes was first revealed in a post-credits teaser trailer at the end of Little Hope, which was released on 30 October 2020. A story trailer that premiered at Gamescom 2021 on 25 August revealed a link to a fictional US military website that gave further details about the game's lore, and it also previewed the game's collector edition, the Pazuzu Edition. The Pazuzu Edition included the game's Curator's Cut, a collector's box, an art print, a set of stickers, a figurine of one of the vampiric creatures, and an eclipse-shaped button. Preceded by a September 2021 hands-on preview, House of Ashes was released for PlayStation 4, PlayStation 5, Windows, Xbox One, and Xbox Series X/S on 22 October 2021. A trailer for the next game in the anthology, The Devil in Me, was featured at the end of House of Ashes. The Devil in Me was released on 18 November 2022.

Compared to Little Hope, House of Ashes sold 27% fewer physical copies in the United Kingdom upon its debut. The game entered the UK boxed charts at number six, with 48% of boxed sales from PS5 users. The PS4 and Xbox versions, respectively, comprised 36% and 16% of physical sales at the time. House of Ashes dropped to number 21 on the week of 30 October, denoting a 52% decrease in sales. The October 2021 issue for the GSD Top 20 Games chart, which weighs downloads and physical purchases, placed House of Ashes at number 11.

== Reception ==
=== Critical response ===
Reception

Aggregate scores
Aggregator	Score
Metacritic	PC: 73/100; PS4: 74/100; PS5: 72/100; XSXS: 74/100
OpenCritic	59% recommend

Review scores
Publication	Score
Destructoid	6/10
Game Informer	7.5/10
GameSpot	8/10
GamesRadar+	3/5
Hardcore Gamer	3.5/5
IGN	8/10
PC Gamer (US)	80/100
Push Square	7/10
Shacknews	8/10
VG247	3/5

House of Ashes received "mixed or average" reception, according to the review aggregator website Metacritic, while 59% of critics recommended the game according to OpenCritic. Several reviews wrote that despite narrative and technical flaws, it was the best entry of the anthology so far (Note: Cited to multiple reviews) and the closest Supermassive had gotten to replicating the quality of their breakout game, Until Dawn (2015). (Note: Cited to multiple reviews) VentureBeat journalist Dean Takahashi felt the series was starting to become formulaic with House of Ashes's release, whereas an Edge critic wrote that some of the systems supporting the series were becoming outdated.

Positive comments about the gameplay revolved around the replay value, QTE intensity, collectibles, and multiple modes of play. Reviewers wrote about the game's bearings feature and the branching story elements, finding them well-executed, whereas Rock Paper Shotgun's Alice Bell wrote that the narrative choices often led to incongruous dialogue. Although noting some awkward moments in the dialogue, others found the game generally well-written and an effective balance of camp, fun, and horror. The cast's acting was considered sufficient for the drama and improved compared to previous games in the anthology; Play's Jess Kinghorn described the performances as serviceable but suggested that some actors should have displayed more intensity. Takahashi was more reserved with his praise, saying it was not memorable. Pacing, meanwhile, was a recurring point of criticism. Many reviewers were also frustrated by House of Ashes' efforts to simultaneously be a video game and emulate a horror film; Tom Orry of VG247 thought it diminished the game's interactivity. Kinghorn noted that future games in the anthology could benefit from runtimes closer to that of traditional films to balance the cinematic aspirations with giving players enough to do.

Critics appreciated the new-generation graphics; some disliked moments when game textures glitched, characters talked over each other, or facial animations remained still. Referencing Rachel's animations, Matt Kamen of Empire likened the glitches to an "uncanny valley" experience, and The A.V. Club's Alex McLevy said "whether that's due to shitty budgets for mo-cap or her performance, I leave to the fates to decide". The camera work was deemed superior to that of previous Dark Pictures games, with praise for its ability to evoke claustrophobia. Despite this, some critics were not sufficiently scared during their gameplay. While reviews varied regarding the monsters' visual design, whether they deemed it intimidating or "ridiculous", a few wrote the lighting, music score, and soundscape were successful in building suspense. Kamen and Ian Higton of Eurogamer highlighted the persistent dread throughout the game, praising it for effectively portraying the Lovecraftian and Mesopotamian premise.

Several criticisms about the protagonists revolved around Rachel, Eric, and Nick's love triangle. Game Informer's Marcus Stewart wrote it felt out of place given the constant danger in which the three found themselves, while Bell and GameSpot's Richard Wakeling said the love triangle was akin to a contrived soap opera. Reviewers instead found Salim and Jason's interactions more interesting, highlighting their competency, pragmatism, and willingness to cooperate. Rachel Weber of GamesRadar+ called Salim the only likable character of the group, while Jordan Devore of Destructoid said he was the most relatable of the characters. Jason received some praise, with critics enjoying his capability to maintain camaraderie with Salim. Relatedly, the game's depiction of the Iraq War received extensive commentary. Some opined that it provided a balanced portrayal to both sides, sufficiently humanised Salim, and avoided juxtaposing Americans as heroic and Arabs as violent rebels. However, Polygon's Cass Marshall contended that too much time was spent showcasing American animosity towards Salim and wished for additional Iraqi representation. Kotaku's Sisi Jiang said that House of Ashes perpetuated harmful stereotypes regarding the war on terror and acted as imperialist propaganda. Jiang felt Americans were associated with positive imagery, while Iraq was othered, citing a scene where Jason compared fighting vampires to fighting Iraqis. Furthermore, Zaher Albalbisi of IGN Middle East noted that Iraqi characters mistakenly spoke Egyptian Arabic rather than Iraqi Arabic. This also included Rachel while trying to converse with hostages.

=== Accolades ===
House of Ashes was nominated for Best Multiplayer Game and Best PlayStation Game at the 2021 Gamescom Awards. In 2022, it received five nominations for the NAVGTR Awards: Outstanding Camera Direction in a Game Engine, Direction in a Game Cinema, Franchise Adventure Game, Lighting/Texturing, and Sound Editing in a Game Cinema.

== In other games ==
Switchback VR, a spinoff game of the anthology for PlayStation VR2, includes levels for each of the anthology's first four games, including House of Ashes. In February 2024, a House of Ashes themed downloadable content (DLC) for Dark Deception: Monsters & Mortals, a multiplayer horror party game by Indie game developer Glowstick Entertainment was released. The DLC included Jason, Salim, infected Clarice, and infected Balathu as playable characters, as well as a map themed around House of Ashes, which featured vampires.
