= Morningside (film) =

- Directed by: Ron Dias
- Written by: Joanne Jansen; Ron Dias
- Produced by: Joanne Jansen; Ron Dias; Craig Fleming
- Starring: Fefe Dobson; Oluniké Adeliyi; Alex Mallari Jr.; Lovell Adams-Gray; Kiana Madeira; Joanne Jansen; Brandon McKnight
- Cinematography: Martin Wojtunik
- Edited by: Jovaughn Stephens
- Music by: Adrian Bent
- Production company: Ron and Aussie Productions
- Distributed by: AMC Networks, AllBlk
- Release date: September 19, 2024 (Cinéfest)
- Running time: 90 minutes
- Country: Canada
- Languages: English, Patois

Morningside is a Canadian drama film, directed by Ron Dias and released in 2024.

The film explores the lives of seven diverse characters who meet at a community centre in Scarborough as they navigate the challenges of relationships, societal struggles, and the looming threat of gentrification. The film highlights themes of resilience, heritage, and the value of community.

The film premiered at the 2024 Cinéfest Sudbury International Film Festival, and was subsequently screened at the ReelWorld Film Festival and the St. Louis International Film Festival.

== Production ==
The film faced challenges securing initial funding from Canadian institutions like Telefilm and the Canada Council for the Arts, who questioned the market demand for another Scarborough-focused movie following the success of Scarborough and Brother. Despite setbacks, the film received grassroots support from the Scarborough community and businesses, with locations like Mona's Roti and The Real McCoy featured in the production. Funding from U.S.-based streamer Allblk, which previously picked up Dias's earlier film Bite of a Mango, helped bring the project to life. Telefilm later came on board to support the film's marketing after seeing the final cut.

The film has been noted for shooting in various locations, including The Real McCoy burger shop and Warden station, that have since shut down or undergone redevelopment.

The producers also partnered with the Scarborough Boys & Girls Club to raise funds for affordable housing in the area by selling film-branded sweatshirts.

In a February 2025 interview on CBC Radio One's q, Ron Dias spoke about how his upbringing in Scarborough influenced the themes and characters in Morningside.

== Cast ==
- Fefe Dobson as Steph
- Oluniké Adeliyi as Fi
- Alex Mallari Jr. as Josh
- Lovell Adams-Gray as Jay
- Kiana Madeira as Nicki
- Joanne Jansen as Shanice
- Brandon McKnight as Mark
- Orville Cummings as Breeze
- Kiki Hammill as Amber
- Nathan Taylor as Bandoh
- Zahra Bentham as Renee
- Leighton Alexander Williams

== Release ==
Morningside was commercially released on February 21, 2025 in theatres and spent 10 weeks being the highest grossing indie film in Canada of 2025. It made its U.S. premiere on March 27, 2025, at the Landmark Theatre in Westwood, Los Angeles. The red carpet event featured a panel discussion with cast and crew. The film was later released on April 3, 2025, on AMC's ALLBLK streaming service in the United States and simultaneously on Hollywood Suite in Canada.

== Reception ==
Richard Crouse wrote: "A fractured portrait of a place and a place in time, "Morningside" does a good job of weaving together disparate stories to form a narrative whole. The structure is complex, but the content is down-to-earth, essaying themes of resilience, hope, gentrification and tragedy. It’s a broad canvas, but captivating characters keep the piecemeal story cohesive and compelling."

Kevin Bourne in Shifter magazine wrote: "[T]wo things which have alluded [sic] Toronto are feature films made by Toronto filmmakers which have garnered attention outside of the city, and films set in Toronto. ... [Morningside] walks the fine line between having themes and experiences that reflect inner city life, similar to major American and UK cities, that will resonate with audiences everywhere, while being distinctly Toronto. ... Supporting the standout performances and storytelling are the directing and cinematography, including overhead and over the shoulder shots and angles, that did the performances justice. ... Morningside is a groundbreaking moment in Toronto and Canadian cinema which is helping to usher in a new era of local filmmaking."

Raevin Larue was not sure what the viewer was meant to take away from the ending. "Morningside is 10/10. ... Morningside left me split. On one hand, I am extremely impressed with the quality of the performances and the pacing of this narrative. On the other, I am disappointed at the lack of accountability placed on the true villains of this story. I fell in love with all of these characters because of how well they were written. But, once their lives all connected, the story fell apart for me because it was not clear what co-writers Joanne Jansen and Ron Dias were trying to say. As a viewer not native to Scarborough, I am not sure what I am meant to take away from the ending. With its bleak and heartbreaking finale, there was no solution provided."
