= The Things You Think I'm Thinking =

- Directed by: Sherren Lee
- Written by: Jesse LaVercombe
- Produced by: Charlie Hidalgo; Sherren Lee
- Starring: Prince Amponsah; Jesse LaVercombe
- Cinematography: Ian Macmillan
- Edited by: Simone Smith
- Music by: Casey Manierka-Quaile
- Production company: Meraki Moving Pictures
- Release date: September 17, 2017 (AFF)
- Running time: 14 minutes
- Country: Canada
- Language: English

The Things You Think I'm Thinking is a 2017 Canadian short drama film, directed by Sherren Lee. The film stars Prince Amponsah as Sean, a gay man struggling with his emotional insecurities and body image issues as he embarks on his first date with another man (Jesse LaVercombe) since being badly scarred and losing both of his arms in a house fire.

LaVercombe wrote the screenplay as a tribute to Amponsah. It was Amponsah's first film role after returning to the stage in 2016, following his own real-life injuries in a 2012 apartment fire.

The film premiered at the 2017 Atlantic Film Festival. It won the Alliance of Women Film Journalists' Emerging Director Award for Best Short Film at the 2017 Whistler Film Festival, the Jury Prize for Best International Short Film at the 2018 Outfest, a Special Jury Prize at the 2018 Canadian Film Festival, and the award for Best Canadian Short Film at the 2018 Inside Out Film and Video Festival.

The film was broadcast on CBC Television's anthology series Canadian Reflections in December 2018.
