= Prince's Tale =

- Directed by: Jamie Miller
- Produced by: Jamie Miller
- Starring: Prince Amponsah
- Cinematography: Ryan Haas
- Edited by: Thom Smalley
- Music by: Casey Manierka-Quaile
- Release date: May 1, 2018
- Running time: 13 minutes
- Country: Canada
- Language: English

Prince's Tale is a Canadian short documentary film, directed by Jamie Miller and released in 2018. The film profiles Prince Amponsah, a Toronto actor rebuilding his career as a performer after an apartment fire which left his body badly scarred and resulted in the amputation of both of his arms.

The film premiered at the 2018 Hot Docs Canadian International Documentary Festival, where it won the Betty Youson Award for Best Canadian Short Documentary.

At the 7th Canadian Screen Awards in 2019, the film was shortlisted for Best Short Documentary.
