= Float (2023 film) =

2023 Canadian drama film

- Film poster
- Directed by: Sherren Lee
- Written by: Jesse LaVercombe; Sherren Lee
- Based on: Float by Kate Marchant
- Produced by: Robbie Amell; Aaron Au; Jeff Chan; Jamie D. Greenberg; Matthew Kariatsumari; Aron Levitz; Chris Paré; Shawn Williamson
- Starring: Andrea Bang; Robbie Amell
- Cinematography: Alfonso Chin
- Edited by: Simone Smith
- Music by: Dan Mangan; Jesse Zubot
- Production companies: Collective Pictures; Brightlight Pictures; Elevation Pictures
- Distributed by: Elevation Pictures; Lionsgate
- Release date: September 30, 2023 (VIFF)
- Running time: 100 minutes
- Country: Canada
- Language: English

Float is a 2023 Canadian drama film, directed by Sherren Lee. The film stars Andrea Bang as Waverly, a young woman with a tense relationship with her parents who decides to spend the summer before starting university staying with her aunt in the coastal beach town of Holden, based on Tofino, where she is drawn into a romance with lifeguard Blake (Robbie Amell) when he gives her swimming lessons.

The film was written by Lee and Jesse LaVercombe, as an adaptation of a Wattpad story by writer Kate Marchant. The character of Waverly was not written as being of Asian ancestry in the original story, but Lee chose to write the film adaptation that way so that she could draw on some of her own cultural background.

The film premiered at the 2023 Vancouver International Film Festival, and screened in the Canadian Narrative Competition at the 2023 Calgary International Film Festival.

It went into commercial release on February 9, 2024.

== Plot ==
It is the beginning of summer. A young Taiwanese woman, Waverley Liu, is a newly graduated doctor who will start her Family Practice residency in Toronto at the end of the summer. Currently, she is planning to go to Taipei to live with her parents whom she has not seen in four years until her residency starts However, her overbearing mother, has arranged a research job in Toronto for the summer, which is of no interest whatsoever for Waverley. Instead, she impulsively decides to visit her aunt Rachel in the tiny coastal town of Holden (in the film) modeled after Tofino, British Columbia in Canada. Rachel who offers Waverly her guest room and encourages her to stay for the summer.

Walking downtown, Waverly finds Rachel painting a mural on a cafe wall. She reveals that her parents do not yet know she is not in Toronto. Rachel says she is not concerned and confesses she has not spoken to her sister for ages.

Rachel suggests Waverly introduce herself in the cafe, as they are 'family'. The owner Lena is very welcoming. Her twin brother Jesse is visiting. Lena invites Waverly to join locals by the dock later for a barbecue.

Lena introduces Waverly to her partner Van and Blake Hamilton. She recognizes him as Rachel's next door neighbor with chickens. Shortly after, he argues with his little sister Isabel, as she resists leaving. Scuffling, they knock Waverly into the water. When she sinks, Blake jumps in after her.

The next morning, Waverly bumps into Blake. She confirms she never learned how to swim, so he offers to teach her as he is a lifeguard. However, she explains she is leaving the next day (as she had just told her mother she is heading to Toronto).

Waverly then spends most of the morning sitting on the beach. Blake comes by and wakes her so that she does not burn. They end up going for a walk and getting takeout. As they are walking, they share about themselves. Blake explains he had argued at the barbecue yesterday with his 17 year old sister Isabel. He became her guardian when their parents died a decade ago.

Waverly has not seen hers for four years. They moved with her to Chicago when she was three, enrolled her in boarding school, then returned to Taipei. So, Waverly feels they are strangers. When Blake asks her about Toronto, she explains their changed summer plans. In the fall, Waverly is scheduled to start her medical residency there.

After he drives them home, Waverly asks Blake how swimming classes would work. He explains they could meet up for an hour before he has to work, then she asks to see his chickens. Later on, as Waverly is packing for Toronto, her aunt Rachel asks her if she really needs to do the Toronto summer job, as she would love her to stay. However, Waverly continues packing.

In the morning, however, Waverly finds Blake for a swim lesson. Afterwards, she runs into Isabel, who takes her to her secret place. There they skip rocks and confide in each other. Returning to town, Waverly goes to the cafe and announces she is staying. After pouring a few of them a new special mixed drink, she is hired to work there.

Every morning Waverly and Blake do a swim lesson. One day she kisses him, which gets interrupted. A short time later, they admit they both enjoy each other's company but he does not want to commit, as she is leaving. So, they decide to be just friends. However, Waverly confesses to Rachel she has feelings for Blake, who encourages her to go for it. She also reveals her parents think she is in Toronto.

Once Waverly is officially swim ready, Blake takes her to the ocean. There they kiss, then make love. For the next few days, they are happily together. However, her parents call, so she admits she is in Rachel's town. So they demand she come to Toronto.

Upon hearing, Blake pretends theirs was just a summer fling. Waverly stays in town longer, for Lena and Van's baby shower. Lena's water breaks, so everyone heads to the hospital. On the way, although Blake had been ignoring Waverly, he finally kisses her. Later they talk; she admits she is in love with him, but he does not say it back.

Waverly goes to Toronto to her parents, believing they will spend the rest of the summer together. Instead, they leave the next day, insisting she stay. Waverly settles in to study, when Blake suddenly appears. He confesses he loves her too, and they are again intimate. She invites him to stay.

== Cast ==
- Andrea Bang as Waverly Liu
- Robbie Amell as Blake Hamilton
- Michelle Krusiec as Rachel, Waverly's aunt
- Andrew Bachelor as Jesse, Lena's twin brother
- Rukiya Bernard as Lena
- Ghazal Azarbad as Van, Lena's wife
- Sarah Desjardins as Isabel Hamilton, Blake's sister
- Fiona Fu as Mrs. Liu, Waverly's mom
- Keong Sim as Mr. Liu, Waverly's dad
- Tristan Arthurs as Ethan, Isabel's friend
- Remy Marthaller as Little girl
- Mirella Gibeau as Kristen, the swimming teacher
- Haven Vivero as Little boy

== Soundtrack ==
No.	Title	Music	Performed by	Length
1.	"Don't Waste Your Time"	Dawn Pemberton		2:58
2.	"Sidecar"	Robyn Dell'Unto, Adam King		3:24
3.	"In Our Hearts, We Shine Together, All Good Vibes"	Rafy Levy		5:41
4.	"Come Back To Me (Fan Lai Ruan Shen Bian)"	Hua Juang Shang, Wang Wu Xiong	Performed by Jody Chiang
5.	"Broke Boi Anthem"	Kahdijah Payne	Performed by DijahSB	3:54
6.	"Pump up The Jam"	Manuela Kamosi, Thomas De Quincey	Performed by Technotronic	3:39
7.	"Lay Low"	Dan Mangan, Ryan Guldmond		3:17
8.	"Four Chords"	Dan Mangan, Andy Stochansky

== Reception ==
On the review aggregator website Rotten Tomatoes, 46% of 13 critics' reviews are positive, with an average rating of 5.3/10.

Richard Crouse gave the film three stars and wrote, "It's fitting, that given the setting of the film, that Float is the equivalent of a summer beach read. Despite some clunky, earnest dialogue—'I want to stay here with you but I want to be a doctor,' sounds like a rejected line from a Hallmark movie—the movie does what it set out to do, put a new spin on a classic genre."
