= Code 8 (2019 film) =

Science fiction film by Jeff Chan

- Theatrical release poster
- Directed by: Jeff Chan
- Screenplay by: Chris Pare
- Story by: Jeff Chan
- Based on: Code 8 (2016) short film
- Produced by: Jeff Chan; Robbie Amell; Stephen Amell; Chris Pare; Rebecca Bouck
- Starring: Robbie Amell; Stephen Amell; Sung Kang; Kari Matchett; Greg Bryk; Aaron Abrams; Kyla Kane; Laysla De Oliviera; Vlad Alexis
- Cinematography: Alex Disenhof
- Edited by: Paul Skinner
- Music by: Ryan Taubert
- Production companies: XYZ Films; Collective Pictures; Elevation Pictures
- Distributed by: Elevation Pictures
- Release dates: October 3, 2019 (Sitges Film Festival); December 13, 2019 (Canada)
- Running time: 100 minutes
- Country: Canada
- Language: English
- Budget: $3.5-15 million
- Box office: $157,209

Code 8 is a 2019 Canadian superhero film written and directed by Jeff Chan, and starring the cousins Stephen and Robbie Amell. It is a feature-length version of the 2016 short film of the same name about a man with superhuman abilities who works with a group of criminals to raise money to help his sick mother.

Code 8 was released theatrically in December 2019, with Netflix releasing it for streaming in April 2020.

The film's sequel, Code 8: Part II, was released on Netflix on February 28, 2024. Robbie and Stephen Amell, as well as Aaron Abrams and Alex Mallari Jr., reprise their roles.

== Plot ==
In the early 20th century, the public becomes aware of people with superhuman abilities, known as Powers, resulting in the government passing a law requiring all Powers to register their abilities. Powers become key to the workforce, specifically noted as having helped build Lincoln City as "the city of tomorrow", creating an economic boom. However, as the Third Industrial Revolution begins, Powers are marginalized in the face of increased automation and mechanization.

By the 1990s, a crime syndicate known as the Trust has flooded the streets with an addictive drug called Psyke, made from the spinal fluid of trafficked Powers. Police departments begin using drone-deployed robots, called Guardians, and facial recognition software to combat Power-related crime while a citywide Powers ban is debated.

Connor Reed, a 26-year-old Electric (electrokinetic) looks after his mother, Mary, a Cryo (cryokinetic), whose ailment impedes her from controlling her powers. Due to their status as Powers, finding decent work is difficult, leaving them unable to afford treatment for Mary's condition. Connor makes ends meet by working as an unregistered day laborer alongside other Powers. Elsewhere in the city, a drug raid is conducted by detectives Alex Park and Davis on an apartment complex owned by crime lord Marcus Sutcliffe, the local agent of the Trust and a Reader (mind reader). Marcus is confronted by his superior Westley Cumbo and told to pay his cut to the Trust soon or face consequences.

Connor is approached by Garrett—Marcus' underling and a TK (telekinetic)—and his crew for a job, which turns out to be a robbery of a chemical plant. Connor shorts out an electrical fence in an impressive display of power, piquing Garrett's interest. He is introduced to Marcus and meets Nia, Marcus's apparent girlfriend. Park and Davis arrive at the robbery scene the next day and determine that the stolen chemicals are being used to cut Psyke, indicating Marcus is desperate for revenue.

Garrett recruits Connor for more jobs while training him to maximize his abilities and agrees to help him earn enough money to get Mary's treatment. Connor grows close with Garrett's crew—Freddie, a mute Brawn (super strength), and Maddy, a Pyro (pyrokinetic).

Marcus has the crew rob a bank to pay back the Trust, but the vault contains only a tenth of the money they expected. Wesley's Shifter (shapeshifter) assassin, Copperhead, attempts to kill Marcus for not honoring his debt, but Marcus's bodyguard Rhino, a Brawn with bulletproof skin, kills them. Nia reveals to Connor that she is a Healer, and only remains with Marcus to ease the effects of his Psyke addiction and pay off her imprisoned father's debt.

Mary's condition worsens, and the doctors tell Connor that they need to operate soon to save her. Park and Davis bring Connor in for questioning. Davis wants to plant evidence and coerce him into informing. Park cuts him loose due to lack of evidence. He is revealed to have a daughter who is a TK, and who fears she will be given up because of her difficulty with controlling her powers.

When Connor is released he goes to Garrett and suggests they rob a police-confiscated Psyke transport, which will make them $10 million. They bring the idea to Marcus, where Connor demands Nia heal Mary as payment, while Garrett wants to be made equal partners with Marcus.

On the day of the heist, the crew blocks the transport inside a no-fly zone, preventing backup by drones carrying Guardians. Although they manage to retrieve the Psyke non-lethally, Marcus's men execute police officers and betray them. They kill Maddy and fatally wound Freddie, while Rhino flees with the drugs. Connor tells Garrett that Marcus framed them because of Garrett's demands, and they part ways.

Connor contacts Park and offers up Marcus's hideout. The cops raid it while Connor and Garrett team up to fight and kill both Rhino and Marcus. Garrett takes the Psyke and encourages Connor to use Nia to heal his mother. She pleads with Connor to let her go, as her abilities force her to take the injury or disease onto herself. He takes Nia to the hospital at gunpoint to cure his mother, but changes his mind after having a flashback. Mary dies soon after.

Connor gives Nia his truck to leave the city, while Garrett hands over the Psyke to Wesley and takes over the drug trade for the Trust in Lincoln City. Connor visits his mother's grave before he surrenders himself to the police, while Nia has a tearful visit with her father. Meanwhile, the Powers Ban is being voted on while Park reluctantly accepts an award for the successful raid.

== Cast ==
- Robbie Amell as Connor Reed
- Stephen Amell as Garrett Kelton
- Sung Kang as Officer Alex Park
- Kari Matchett as Mary Reed
- Greg Bryk as Marcus Sutcliffe
- Aaron Abrams as Officer Davis
- Kyla Kane as Nia
- Laysla De Oliveira as Maddy
- Vlad Alexis as Freddie
- Peter Outerbridge as Wesley Cumbo
- Shaun Benson as Dixon
- Martin Roach as Captain Milltown
- Alex Mallari Jr. as Kingston
- Ess Hödlmoser as Copperhead
- Jeff Sinasac as Officer Kuwabara

== Production ==
In 2016, Robbie and Stephen Amell released a short film, Code 8, which acted as a teaser for a potential feature film. An Indiegogo fundraising campaign asking for $200,000 was launched on March 23 and reached $2.4 million by April 24. Fundraising closed with $3.4 million on December 31, 2019, with the continued campaign helping recover costs of DVD pressings and the distribution to contributors of perks, wardrobe, and props from the production. A four-minute segment of the film's closing credits shows a list of only some of the 30,810 contributors to the fundraising campaign.

The first announcement of additional cast came on June 12, 2017, when Laysla De Oliveira joined.

Principal photography began on June 1, 2017, in Toronto.

Ryan Taubert composed the film score, and Sony Masterworks released the soundtrack.

== Release ==
On February 9, 2017, during the Berlin International Film Festival, XYZ Films acquired the international sales rights for the film.

The film was released theatrically in Canada on December 6, 2019 and in the United States on December 13, 2019; its streaming release on Netflix followed on April 11, 2020.

== Reception ==
On the review aggregator website Rotten Tomatoes, 85% of 20 critics' reviews are positive, with an average rating of 6.4/10. Metacritic, which uses a weighted average, assigned the film a score of 48 out of 100, based on five critics, indicating "mixed or average" reviews.

Dennis Harvey of Variety found the crowdfunded Code 8 a "solid genre effort" that "is resourceful and polished on a tight budget". He noted a few limitations, for example a screenplay that "packs in a lot of characters and complications without much time to lend them distinguishing personality", not enough humor to transcend the "sentimental cliché" of a mother needing medical treatment, and a "lack of stylistically bold elements in the competent action sequences". He nevertheless thought the film a "well-crafted mix of crime melodrama and fantasy" with "generally strong" performances from its actors, and visual effects that "present a plausible near-future", and that this feature represented an "impressive leap in scale" from Chan's 2014 debut film.

Noel Murray of Los Angeles Times wrote that while the movie had "clearly been made with passion and intelligence", the "ideas outpace the action" and it was made "without the kind of zip that this kind of story demands".

In April 2020, the film appeared on the Top 10 Netflix list for the United States.

== Future ==
=== Spin-off series ===
In December 2019, a short-form spin-off series was announced to be in development at Quibi, starring Robbie and Stephen Amell, written by Chris Pare, and directed by Jeff Chan. Following the announcement that Quibi was shutting down, the series was left in limbo.

=== Sequel ===
In June 2021, Robbie and Stephen Amell reprised their roles in the sequel film that was released in 2024. Netflix acquired the global rights to the film.
