= Darrin Maharaj =

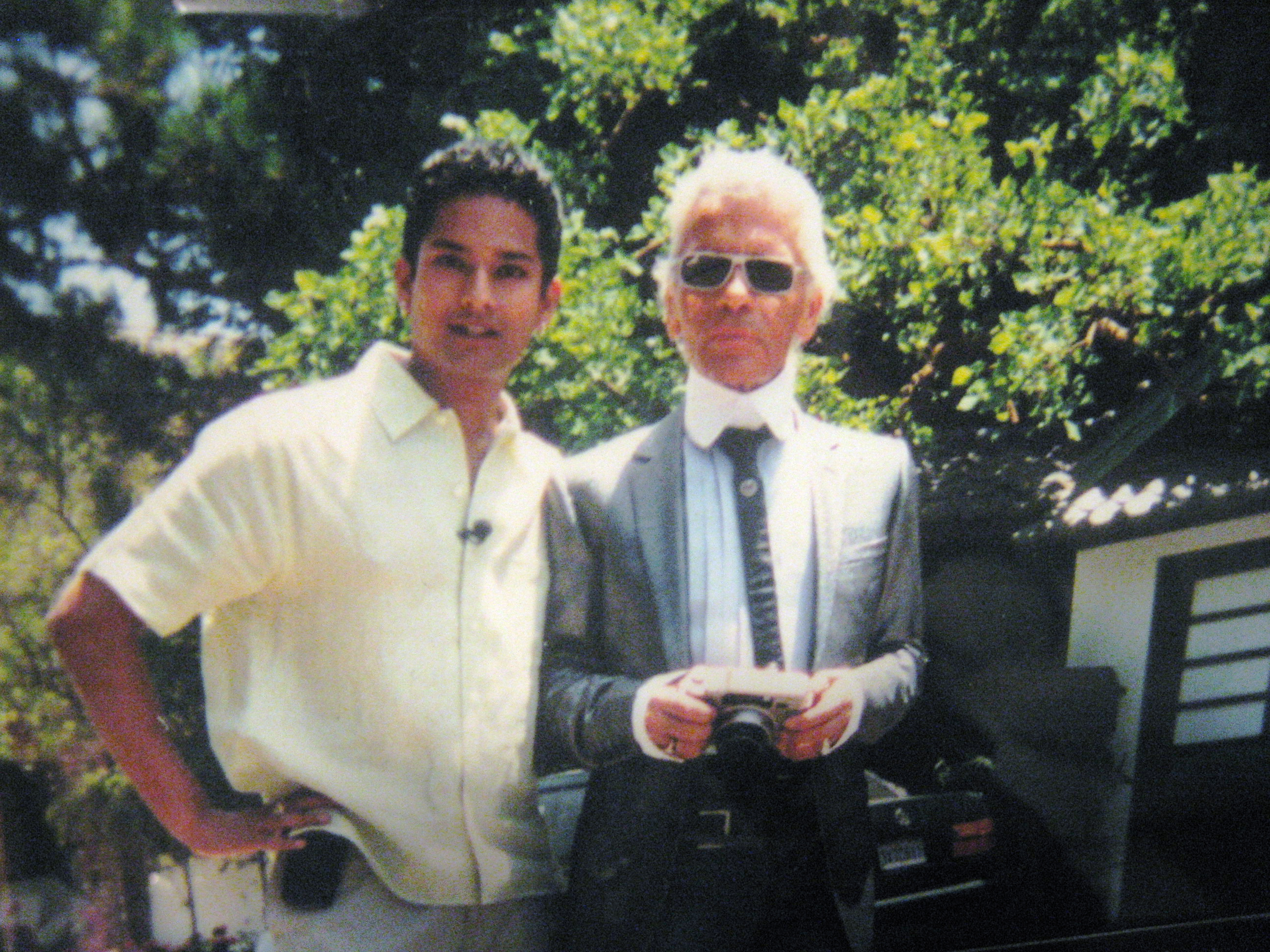
Darrin Maharaj with Karl Lagerfeld.

Darrin Maharaj (born Toronto, Ontario), of Caribbean descent, is a Canadian television host and reporter. Maharaj was voted as one of Vancouver's most eligible bachelors by the Vancouver Sun.

== Early career and education ==
Maharaj entered broadcasting at 19 as a volunteer in community radio. At CKWR 98.7 fm in Waterloo, Ontario he hosted a show called "The 2 Youts" with Eric Lohrenz a.k.a. DJ Lupe. The show began at the midnight-to-4am time slot then moved to prime time. "The 2 Youts" broadcast hip-hop, reggae and electronic music, interviewed popular musicians such as The Beastie Boys and Moby, and promoted local talent. Maharaj also volunteered at Rogers Community Television. Maharaj attended the School of Broadcast Journalism at Fanshawe College in London, Ontario.

== Television ==
After graduation, Maharaj worked in television in general reporting, then became the "Entertainment Videographer" for The New VR in Barrie, Ontario (now 'A' channel). He worked as the reporter, host, camera operator, editor and producer of his daily stories. This role involved travel in North America, interviews and unusual tasks such as wrestling crocodiles at Gatorland, Florida, skydiving and rock climbing.

In 2002, Maharaj participated in the launch of CHUM Television's newest station, Citytv (CKVU), in Vancouver as their "entertainment specialist". On his first day at the station, he was sent to interview Pamela Anderson at her beach home in Malibu, California, where met the designer & photographer, Karl Lagerfeld, during the interview. Lagerfeld was present to photograph Anderson and unexpectedly photographed Maharaj sitting in the front seat of Anderson's Viper.

Other works included reading ten newscasts per week, hosting live cut ins and hosting season finales for programs such as "The Bachelor" and "America's Next Top Model". After 4 years with Citytv Vancouver, Maharaj returned to SunTV, Toronto as a host on "Inside Jam!" and co-host on "Canoe-Live"

In January 2007, Maharaj left SunTV to work with his friend and mentor, Moses Znaimer. Maharaj became the host and reporter for Znaimer's production company MZTV and host for TELUS TV. Ironically, he is often cast as a hard hitting news reporter.

== Film ==
Maharaj has appeared in episodes of the sci-fi series The Collector. He also appeared in the feature, The Exorcism Of Emily Rose with Laura Linney.

== Directing ==
Maharaj worked with Antoine Fuqua on the film Shooter starring Mark Wahlberg.
