= Sherren Lee =

Canadian director

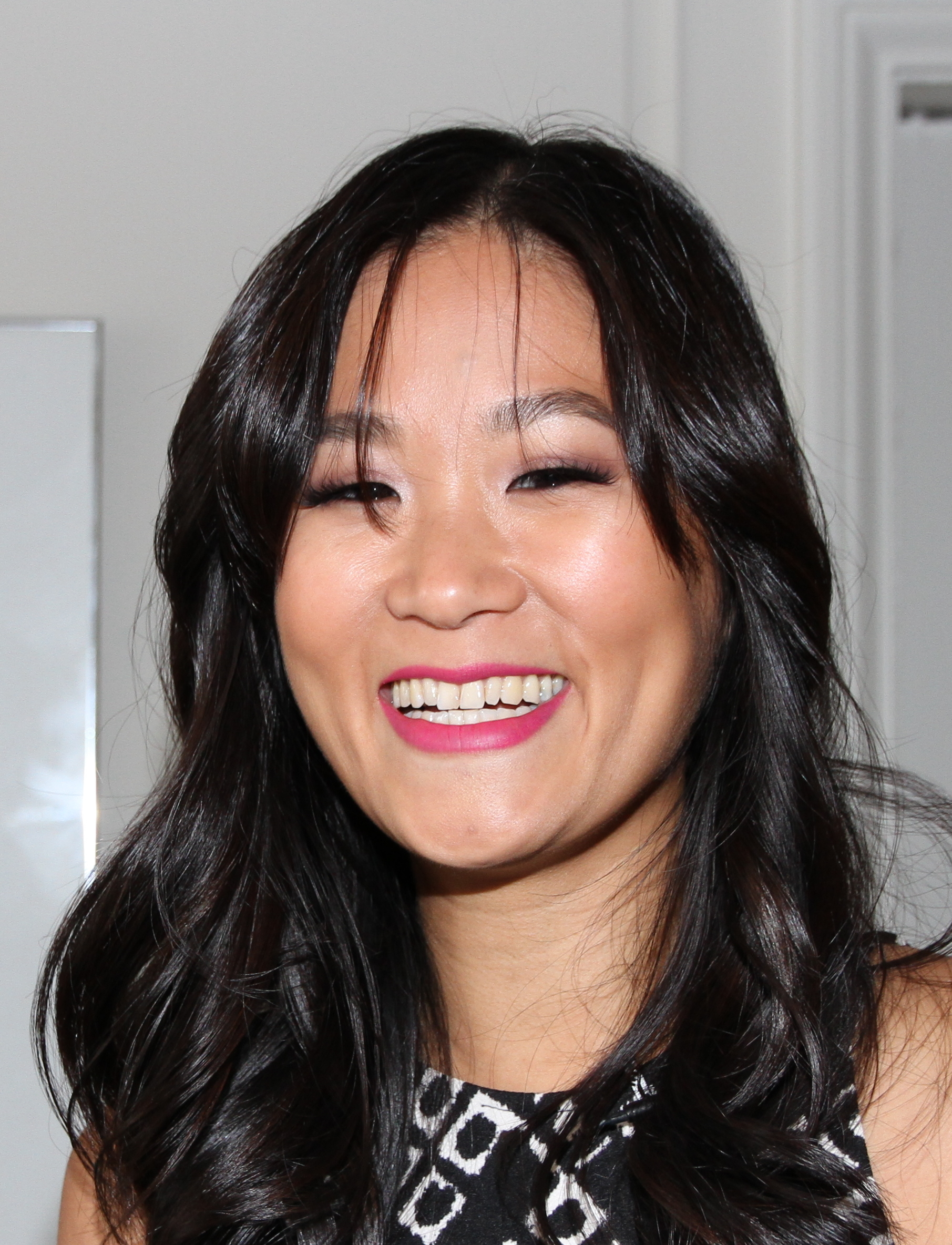
Sherren Lee at the CFC Annual BBQ Fundraiser 2015

Sherren Lee is a Canadian film and television director based in Toronto, Ontario. She is most noted for her 2017 short film The Things You Think I'm Thinking.

The film won various awards, including the AWFJ EDA Award for Best Short Film at the 2017 Whistler Film Festival, the Jury Prize for Best International Short Film at the 2018 Outfest, a Special Jury Prize at the 2018 Canadian Film Festival, and the award for Best Canadian Short Film at the 2018 Inside Out Film and Video Festival.

Lee was born in Taiwan and raised in Montreal, Quebec, and was educated at McGill University and the Canadian Film Centre. She has also directed numerous other short films, as well as episodes of the television series Odd Squad, Dino Dana, Coroner, Hudson & Rex, Murdoch Mysteries, Endlings, Kim's Convenience and Run the Burbs.

Her feature film debut, Float, went into production in 2021, and was released in 2023.
