= Code 8 (2016 film) =

Short film by Jeff Chan

- Title poster
- Directed by: Jeff Chan
- Written by: Jeff Chan; Chris Paré
- Produced by: Robbie Amell; Stephen Amell; Jeff Chan; Chris Paré; Art Chong; Tommy Dingwall; Billie Aleman; Rebecca Bouck
- Starring: Robbie Amell; Sung Kang; Aaron Abrams; Stephen Amell; Chad Donella
- Cinematography: Alex Disenhof
- Edited by: Paul Skinner
- Music by: Ryan Taubert
- Distributed by: YouTube
- Release date: March 22, 2016 (Internet)
- Running time: 10 minutes
- Countries: United States; Canada
- Language: English
- Budget: $2.1 million

Code 8 is a 2016 American-Canadian short science fiction action film directed by Jeff Chan, co-written by Chan and Chris Paré. Starring Robbie Amell, Stephen Amell and Sung Kang, the film was expanded into a feature-length project, also titled Code 8.

The film is a futuristic vision taking place in a world where 4% of the population are born with some type of superhuman ability. Instead of being billionaire superheroes, most "specials" live in poverty and resort to crime, forcing the police to become more militarized.

== Plot ==
Sometime in the future 4% of the earth's population have developed special abilities, but are treated like pariahs and forced by circumstance to live in poverty. The term "special" had become pejorative and those with abilities are treated poorly by those without. In Lincoln City, Connor Reed (Robbie Amell), a young man with special powers, struggles to find work as a day laborer. After a dispute over him and his friend Freddie (Aaron Abrams) being shorted in their pay after completing work, Connor finds himself in a confrontation with police officer Alex Park (Sung Kang) and the many autonomous robot drones backing up the officer.

== Cast ==
- Robbie Amell as Connor Reed, a Special who provides for his family by working as a day labourer. He is a Class 5 Electric, meaning he can manipulate electricity and is capable of emitting an EMP blast strong enough to knock out a city block. He prefers not to use his powers, instead relying on his training as an electrician to find work.
- Sung Kang as Officer Alex Park, a by-the-book cop who does his best to protect Lincoln City while following the rules. He is Officer Dixon's partner.
- Aaron Abrams as Freddie Berko, Connor's friend and a fellow Special. He is a Class 2 Brawn, meaning he has superhuman strength powerful enough to lift a truck with one arm or toss grown men through the air with ease.
- Stephen Amell as Drone Operator #1
- Chad Donella as Dixon, a cop who has a deep prejudice against Specials. He is Officer Park's partner.
- Peter Huang as Drone Pilot 3
- Alfred Rubin Thompson as Joe "Big Joe"
- Al Marchesi as Class 2 Pyro, a Special with the power of pyrokinesis. He can produce flames from his fingers that can be small enough to light a cigarette or hot enough to cut through metal piping.
- Christine Pagulayan as Reporter
- Patrice Henry as Dispatch 1
- Phyllis Politowicz as Grandma
- Tonya Dodds Sinisac as Dispatch 3
- Ryan Freer as Drone Pilot 4
- Jack Horan as Justin Reed
- Jeff Sinasac as Drone Pilot 2

== Production ==
=== History ===
On March 22, 2016, Robbie and Stephen Amell premiered a 10-minute short film as a teaser for a full-length feature, also titled Code 8. While releasing the short, the Amells simultaneously started an Indiegogo campaign in order to fund the full-length feature. With their target being $200,000, the film was funded less than 48 hours, and continued to grow, having exceeded $1,500,000 in a month. Both the Amells expressed that, by going with the crowdfunding route, they can keep the creative control to themselves. Some of the perks to donating to Code 8 included digital copies of both versions of the film, exclusive merchandise, producing credits and some quality time with the Amells. On April 9, 2016, Robbie Amell teased in a Facebook Q&A video that actor Victor Garber had expressed his interest in joining the film. On April 14, 2016, director Jeff Chan made a post about the short film on the social media and news aggregator site Reddit, where he also answered questions in a mini-AMA.

=== Feature film ===
Due to scheduling conflicts, Stephen Amell was not able to star in the short film. However, he did voice a police drone. He confirmed that he will star in the feature. The short film was self-financed as well as calling in favors from friends and family. Production began on June 1, 2017. The film screened at the Sitges Film Festival in October 2019.

== Reception ==
Gizmodo wrote that "The Mysterious Code 8 Film Is An Intriguing Crowdfunding Teaser", and praised the film in writing it "definitely leaves the audience wanting to see what happens next, and it really looks like’s something that Neill Blomkamp would have directed: robotic police officers, some pretty overt political themes, and so forth. We’re certainly interested in seeing where this goes."
