= Stephen Amell =

Canadian actor (born 1981)

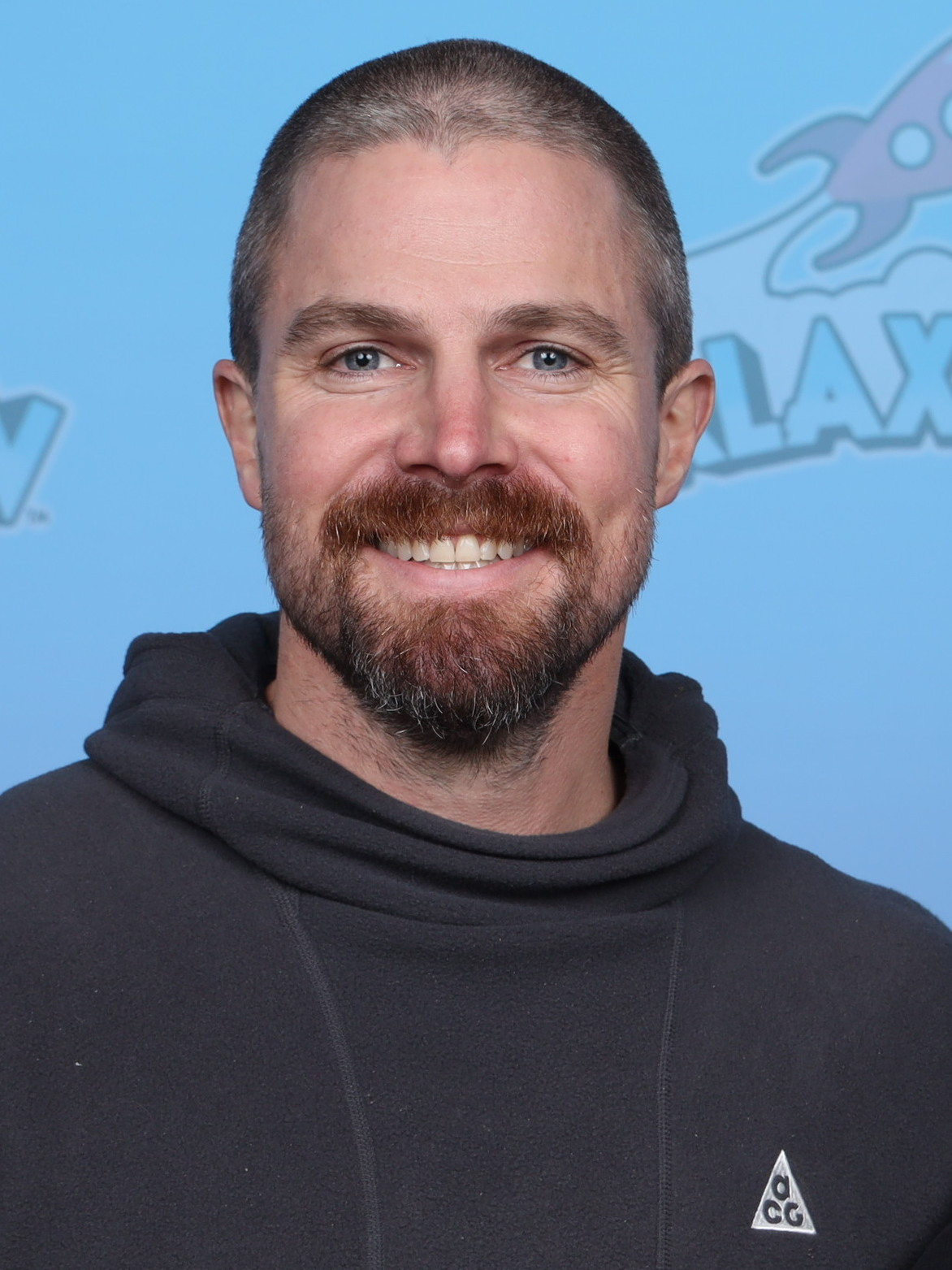
- Amell in 2023
- Born: Stephen Adam Amell; May 8, 1981 (age 45); Toronto, Ontario, Canada
- Citizenship: Canada; US
- Education: St. Andrew's College
- Occupations: Actor; producer
- Years active: 2004–present
- Known for: Green Arrow in Arrow
- Spouses: Carolyn Lawrence (m. 2007; div. 2010) Cassandra Jean (m. 2012)
- Children: 2
- Relatives: Robbie Amell (cousin)

Stephen Adam Amell (born May 8, 1981) is a Canadian-American actor. He came to prominence for playing the lead role of Oliver Queen on the CW superhero series Arrow (2012–2020), based on DC Comics. Amell also appeared in subsequent Arrowverse franchise media, along with reprising his role in various video games. Following the conclusion of Arrow, Amell landed the lead roles in both the Starz drama series Heels (2021–2023), and Suits LA (2025).

Outside of television, Amell portrayed Casey Jones in the superhero film Teenage Mutant Ninja Turtles: Out of the Shadows (2016). Amell co-produced and starred in Code 8 and its sequel Code 8: Part II with his cousin Robbie Amell. He has also made a number of appearances in the professional wrestling circuit.

== Early life ==
Stephen Adam Amell was born on May 8, 1981, in Toronto, Ontario, the son of Sandra Anne (née Bolté) and Thomas J. Amell. He is a first cousin of actor Robbie Amell. He attended St. Andrew's College, a private independent school for boys, and graduated in 2000.

== Acting career ==
=== 2004–2012: Early career ===
Amell appeared in two episodes of the fourth season of Queer as Folk as the Liberty Ride spinning instructor in 2004. Amell played Adam in the first season of the television series Dante's Cove; he was replaced in the second season by Jon Fleming. In 2007, Amell won a Gemini Award for his guest-starring role on ReGenesis. The same year he was also nominated for a Gemini Award in the Best Ensemble Cast Category for Rent-a-Goalie. He had recurring roles in the TV series Da Kink in My Hair and Heartland. On December 3, 2010, Amell joined the cast of The Vampire Diaries as werewolf 'Brady' for season 2. Amell starred as the real life convicted killer Joran van der Sloot in the Lifetime film Justice for Natalee Holloway which originally aired in May 2011.

On October 2, 2011, season 3 of HBO's series Hung premiered with Amell starring as busboy-turned-prostitute Jason, a younger rival "ho" to Thomas Jane's Ray Drecker. He also appeared as Jim in the fourth season of 90210. Amell announced on October 28, 2011, that he had just finished filming the Christmas episode of New Girl with Zooey Deschanel and Max Greenfield. He touches on the experience of filming his first "network half-hour comedy" in an interview with Daemon's TV. On November 9, 2011, Amell was announced for the recurring role of Scottie, a paramedic on ABC's Private Practice. He also played the role of Travis McKenna in Blue Mountain State.

=== 2012–2020: Arrow ===
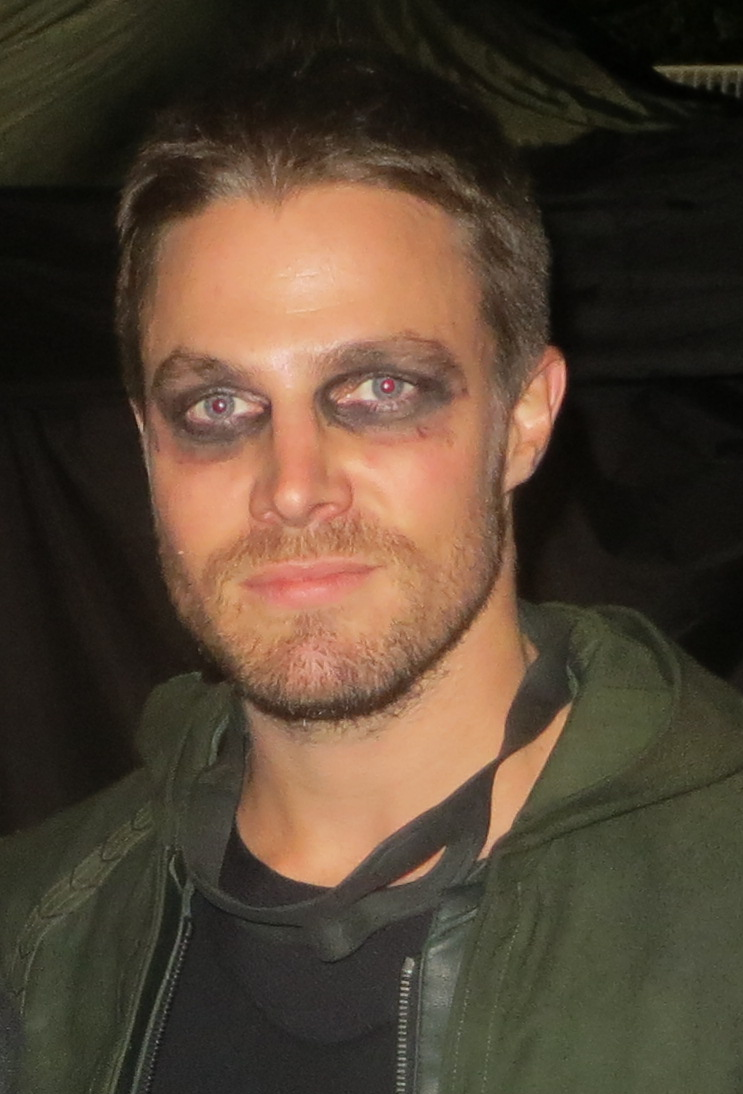
Amell on the set of Arrow in September 2014

In January 2012, Amell was cast as Oliver Queen in The CW series Arrow, based on the DC Comics superhero of the same name. This series and role led to Amell appearing as the character on other superhero series on the network as part of the growing Arrowverse, including The Flash, Legends of Tomorrow, Supergirl, and Batwoman, as well as the CW Seed webseries Vixen.

Amell co-starred in Teenage Mutant Ninja Turtles: Out of the Shadows (released on June 3, 2016) as vigilante "Casey Jones". Amell announced in May 2017 that he would be participating on a special celebrity edition of American Ninja Warrior. Amell demonstrated great physical abilities which was reflective of his athleticism in his portrayal of Oliver Queen. In 2017, he took part in the directorial debut of former Heartland co-star Michelle Morgan, a short film entitled Mi Madre, My Father, playing the estranged father of a six-year-old girl. Morgan raised funds for the production through a crowdfunding campaign. The film premiered at the 2018 Cannes Film Festival.

In March 2019, Amell announced the end of Arrow with its eighth and final season, which premiered in October 2019 and concluded in January 2020.

=== 2020–present: Post-Arrow ===
His first post-Arrow project was announced in August 2019 as Heels, a Starz drama series set in the world of independent professional wrestling. In December of the same year, it was announced that short-form streaming platform Quibi were developing a spin-off series starring Amell and his cousin Robbie Amell, developed from their crowd-funded film Code 8. In September 2023, Heels was canceled after two seasons. In February 2024, Stephen Amell was cast as Ted Black in the upcoming NBC pilot Suits LA, based on the USA Network original series Suits. On July 19, 2024, Suits LA has ordered to series by NBC.

Amell plays Henry Roland, a police officer, in the Crave crime drama series The Borderline. it debuted in February 2026.

He garnered positive reviews for his leading role in the Canadian crime film Little Lorraine, released in 2026.

== Professional wrestling career ==
=== WWE (2015) ===
As an avid professional wrestling fan, Amell campaigned for a guest appearance on WWE's weekly Raw program.

In May 2015, it was reported that he was set to wrestle Stardust (Cody Rhodes) at WWE's SummerSlam pay-per-view in August. Amell made his first WWE appearance on the May 25 episode of Raw, where he had a confrontation with Stardust. Amell returned to Raw in early August; after being assaulted in the audience by Stardust, Amell got into the ring to attack him until being contained by security. Following a backstage segment with Triple H, it was announced that Neville would team with Amell to face Stardust and King Barrett at SummerSlam.

At the event on August 23, 2015, Amell and Neville defeated Barrett and Stardust in a tag team match. Amell participated in the wrestling, and, behind the scenes, wrestlers were said to have been impressed with Amell's performance. Amell became friends with Rhodes, with whom he later also worked on Arrow.

On December 21, 2015, Amell was awarded a Slammy for the "Celebrity Moment of the Year" for his dive onto Stardust during the match.

=== Ring of Honor (2017) ===
Amell returned to professional wrestling for Ring of Honor on November 17, 2017, at Survival of the Fittest. On the day of the show, Amell joined the Bullet Club faction, and teamed with Cody Rhodes, Kenny Omega, and The Young Bucks (Matt and Nick Jackson) in a five-on-four tag team match. They defeated The Addiction (Christopher Daniels and Frankie Kazarian), Flip Gordon, and Scorpio Sky, and Amell again participated in the wrestling, including being put through a table by The Addiction.

=== All In (2018) ===
On August 6, 2018, it was announced that Amell would be competing at All In, in his first-ever singles match, where he was defeated by Christopher Daniels.

=== All Elite Wrestling (2020) ===
On February 29, 2020, Amell made an appearance at All Elite Wrestling's Revolution, where he accompanied Cody Rhodes alongside Rhodes' Nightmare Family for his match against MJF.

== Philanthropy ==
Amell has hosted a number of successful fundraising campaigns via the crowd funded merchandise platform Represent.com. In 2014, Amell partnered with the charity Fuck Cancer to raise almost a million dollars with the release of a T-shirt featuring his face on the front (with a Post-it note on his forehead and featuring the organization's name). He ended up selling over 60,000 shirts from this campaign. In January 2015, Amell launched his second Represent.com campaign featuring a word he made up, Sinceriously, to benefit two mental health charities: Paws and Stripes and Stand For The Silent. In August 2015, Amell used his guest appearance on WWE Raw with Stardust to raise funds via his third campaign for children's hospice Emily's House in Toronto. The campaign raised $300,000, and Amell and Stardust presented a cheque together at Emily's House. During the Red Nose Day special of American Ninja Warrior, Amell donated $35,000 for completing all six obstacles, and an extra obstacle, the Salmon Ladder.

== Personal life ==
Amell married his first wife, fellow Canadian Carolyn Lawrence, on December 8, 2007, in Toronto. The couple divorced in 2010. Amell married actress and model Cassandra Jean on December 25, 2012, in a private ceremony in the Caribbean, and for a second time in New Orleans on May 26, 2013. The couple have a daughter who was born on October 15, 2013. They have a son, born May 13, 2022. Amell revealed on his Instagram that he became a dual citizen of Canada and the United States and took his U.S. citizenship oath in August 2022 at Dodger Stadium.

== Controversies ==
Amell's statements and behavior have occasionally drawn controversy. In September 2015, after a Muslim student was arrested for bringing a disassembled digital clock to his high school in Irving, Texas, Amell tweeted, "Stereotyping Texas isn't any better than stereotyping Ahmed". The post drew criticism online, prompting Amell to take a break from social media.

In 2018, Amell tweeted "my âpölògīés" in response to criticism about his failure to use the acute accent while tweeting singer Beyoncé's name. After he was accused by online commenters of disrespecting black names, he said he had omitted the accent while being "lazy in the midst of a mediocre joke".

In 2020, during the Black Lives Matter protests, Amell was criticized by comic book writer Tee Franklin and others for saying that racism is a systemic problem but that he had not personally "seen it in action".

In 2021, Amell was asked to leave a Delta Air Lines flight traveling from Austin to Los Angeles for yelling at his wife. He later said he was intoxicated at the time.

In July 2023, Amell was criticized for comments he made at a fan convention regarding the 2023 SAG-AFTRA strike. While he expressed support for SAG-AFTRA as his union, he called striking a "reductive negotiating tactic" and "myopic" and seemed to criticize that the strike banned him from promoting the second season of Heels. He later clarified his opinion, saying that while he does not like striking, he "[understands] fundamentally why we're here" and stated that his support for the union was unconditional and that he stood with them. Amell did not attend the Arrow cast reunion on the picket line outside the Warner Bros. studio lot in Burbank, California, as he was in New York City at the time, but on the day of the reunion, he was photographed on the picket line in front of the Warner Bros. Discovery offices in New York and reportedly sent his regards to his former showrunners in California. Marc Guggenheim, executive producer of Arrow and organizer of the revival, interpreted his attendance in New York as a symbolic stand in solidarity.

== Filmography ==
=== Film ===
Year	Title	Role	Notes
2007	The Tracey Fragments	Detective	
2007	Closing the Ring	Teddy Gordon	
2009	Screamers: The Hunting	Guy	Direct-to-video
2011	Stay with Me	Travis	Short film
2016	Code 8	Drone Operator #1	Voice; short film; also producer
2016	Teenage Mutant Ninja Turtles: Out of the Shadows	Casey Jones	
2018	Mi Madre, My Father	Hal Nelson	Short film
2019	Code 8	Garrett Kelton	Also producer
2024	Calamity Jane	Wild Bill Hickok	
2024	Code 8: Part II	Garrett Kelton	Also producer
2025	Little Lorraine	Jimmy	

=== Television ===
Year	Title	Role	Notes
2004	Queer as Folk	Spinning Instructor	2 episodes
2004	Degrassi: The Next Generation	Doorman	Episode: "Ghost in the Machine: Part 2"
2005	Missing	Ian Harrington	Episode: "Paper Anniversary"
2005	Tilt	Bellboy	Episode: "Rivered"
2005	Beautiful People	Jason	5 episodes
2005	Dante's Cove	Adam	2 episodes
2006	The House Next Door	Buddy Harrelson	Television film
2006–2008	Rent-a-Goalie	Billy	Main role
2007	ReGenesis	Craig Riddlemeyer	2 episodes
2007–2009	Da Kink in My Hair	Matthew	4 episodes
2007–2012	Heartland	Nick Harwell	6 episodes
2009	Flashpoint	Peter Henderson	Episode: "Exit Wounds"
2010	Blue Mountain State	Travis McKenna	2 episodes
2010	CSI: Miami	Peter Truitt	Episode: "Sleepless in Miami"
2010	NCIS: Los Angeles	Marine Gunnery Sergeant Andrew Weaver	Episode: "Bounty"
2010	The Cutting Edge: Fire and Ice	Philip Seaverm	Television film
2011	The Vampire Diaries	Brady	2 episodes
2011	CSI: Crime Scene Investigation	A.J. Gust	Episode: "73 Seconds"
2011	Justice for Natalee Holloway	Joran van der Sloot	Television film
2011	Hung	Jason	Main role (season 3); 10 episodes
2011	90210	Jim	2 episodes
2011–2012	New Girl	Kyle	2 episodes
2012	Private Practice	Scott Becker	7 episodes
2012–2020	Arrow	Oliver Queen / Green Arrow	Main role
2013	When Calls the Heart	Wynn Delaney	Television film
2014–2023	The Flash	Oliver Queen / Green Arrow	9 episodes
2015	Reelside	Himself	Episode: "Superheroes"
2015	WWE Raw	Himself	2 episodes
2016–2020	Legends of Tomorrow	Oliver Queen / Green Arrow	6 episodes
2017	American Ninja Warrior	Himself	Episode: "Celebrity Ninja Warrior for Red Nose Day"
2017–2019	Supergirl	Oliver Queen / Green Arrow	3 episodes
2019	Batwoman	Oliver Queen / Green Arrow	Episode: "Crisis on Infinite Earths: Part Two"
2021–2023	Heels	Jack Spade	Main role
2025	Suits LA	Ted Black	Main role
2026	The Borderline	Henry Roland	Main role
2027	Baywatch	Hobie Buchanan	Main role

=== Video games ===
Year	Title	Role	Notes
2013	Injustice: Gods Among Us	Green Arrow	
2014	Lego Batman 3: Beyond Gotham	Green Arrow	

=== Web ===
Year	Title	Role	Notes
2015	Dudes Being Dudes in Wine Country	Himself	Also co-creator
2015–2016	Vixen	Oliver Queen / The Arrow / Green Arrow	Voice; 5 episodes
2017–2024	Being The Elite	Himself	Cameo
2021–2024	Shot of Brandi	Himself	Cameo
