= Robbie Amell =

Canadian actor and producer (born 1988)

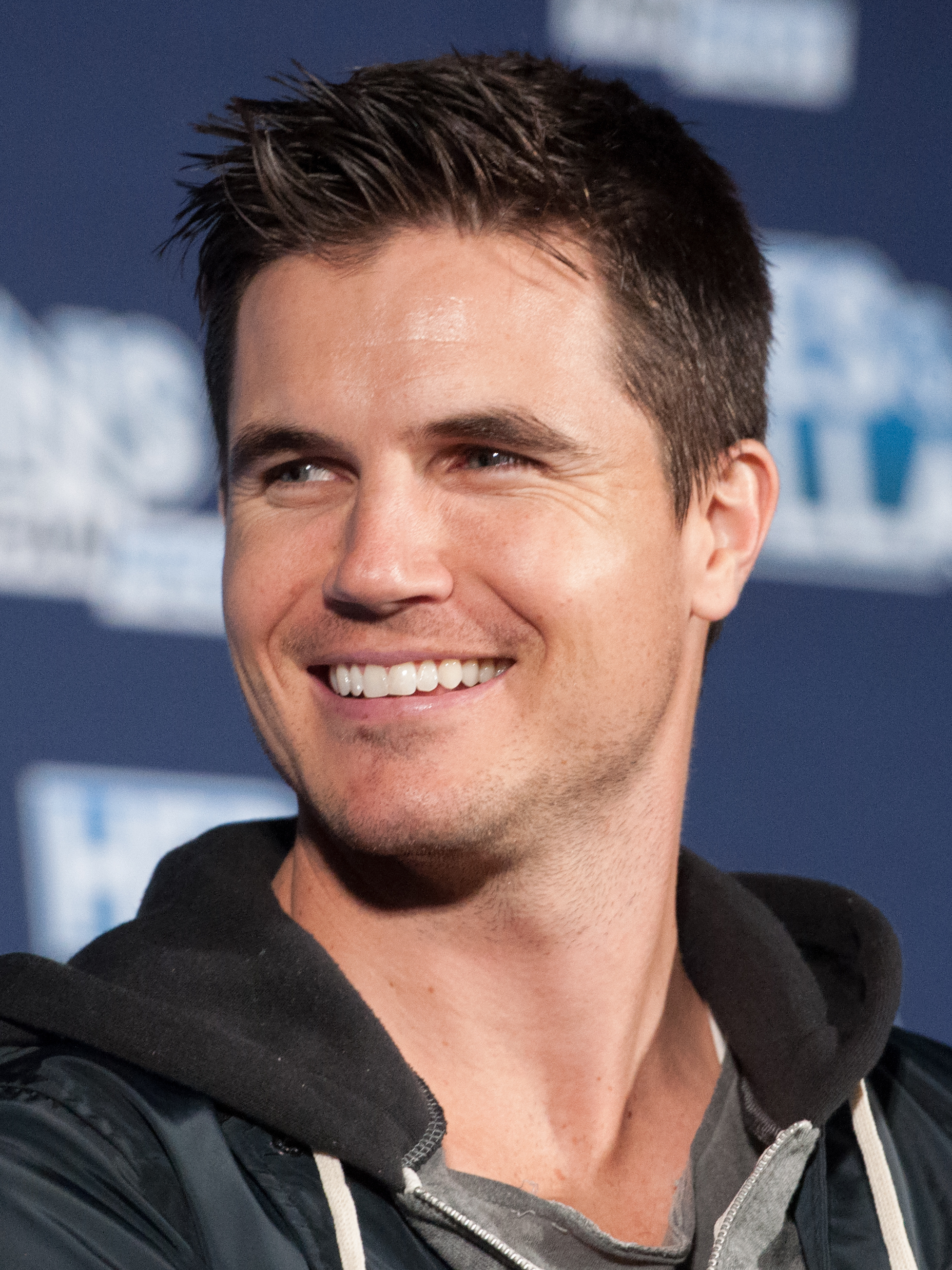
- Amell in 2017
- Born: Robert Patrick Amell IV; April 21, 1988 (age 38); Toronto, Ontario, Canada
- Citizenship: Canada (1988–present); United States (2020–present)
- Occupations: Actor; producer
- Years active: 1994–present
- Spouse: Italia Ricci (m. 2016)
- Children: 1
- Relatives: Stephen Amell (cousin)

Robert Patrick Amell IV (born April 21, 1988) is a Canadian and American actor and producer. He is best known for his roles as Nathan Brown in the Prime Video series Upload (2020–2025), Stephen Jameson on The CW series The Tomorrow People (2013–2014), and Ronnie Raymond / Firestorm on The CW series The Flash (2014–2017, 2022). Other roles Fred Jones in the films Scooby-Doo! The Mystery Begins (2009) and Scooby-Doo! Curse of the Lake Monster (2010), The Hunters as Paxton Flynn (2013), The DUFF as Wesley Rush (2015), The Babysitter as Max (2017), and the science fiction film Code 8 as Connor Reed (2019); the latter of which also starred his cousin, Stephen Amell. He also appeared on television shows such as Murdock Mysteries Season 1 episode 8 2006, Life with Derek (2006–2008), True Jackson, VP (2008–2011), Unnatural History (2010), and Revenge (2011–2012).

== Early life ==
Robert Patrick Amell IV was born on April 21, 1988 in Toronto, the son of Josephine "Jo" Burden and Robert Patrick "Rob" Amell III, who work in the custom jewellery business. His first cousin is Arrow actor, Stephen Amell.

Along with his sister, he started modelling and acting in small roles in commercials when he was six years old. At age sixteen, he began landing roles in high school plays such as Louis and Dave and Fionia, Picasso at the Lapin Agile and The Importance of Being Earnest.

Amell attended Canadian Studios Acting Academy. He graduated from Lawrence Park Collegiate Institute in Toronto in 2006.

== Career ==
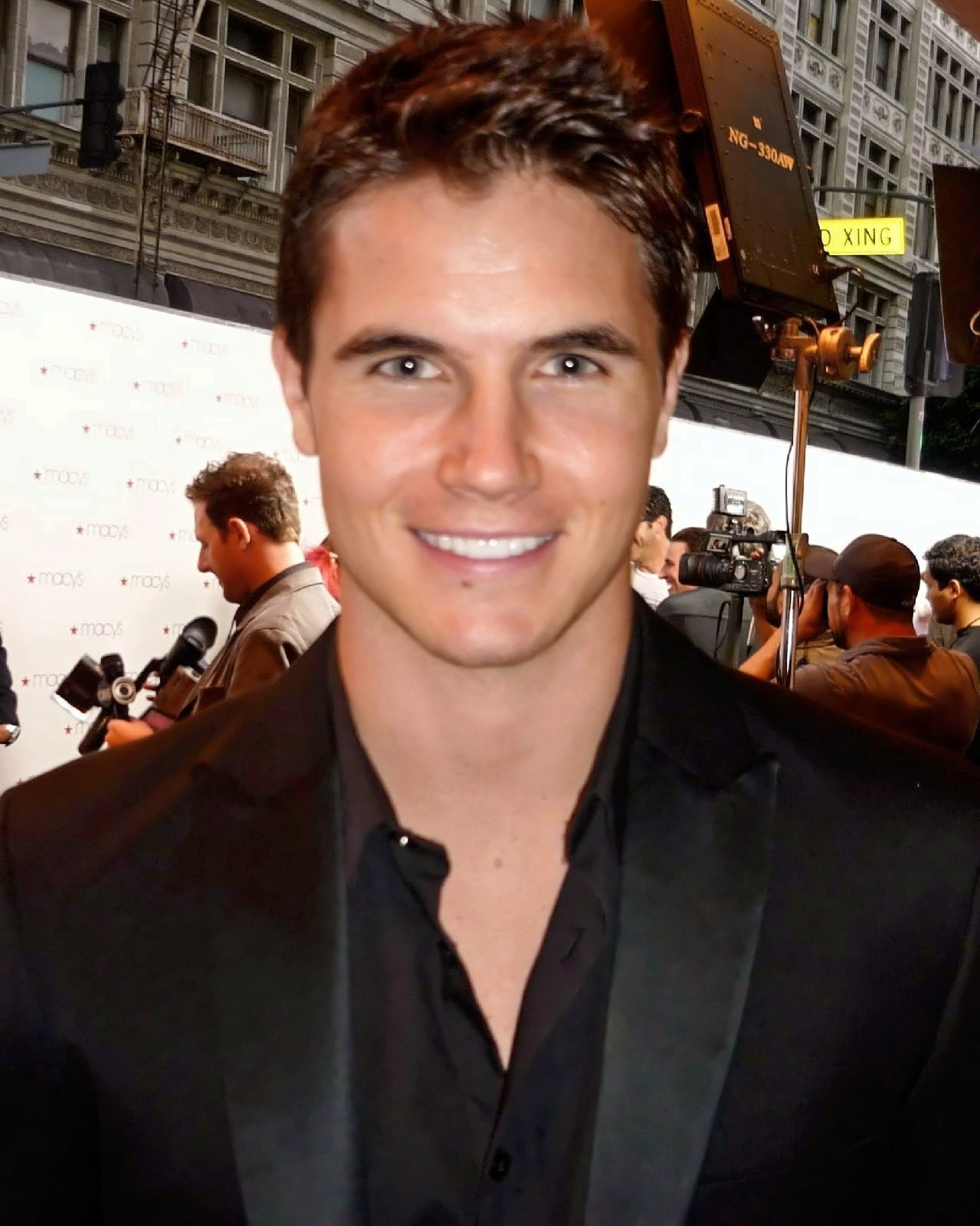
Amell in September 2010

Amell's first role was Daniel Murtaugh in Cheaper by the Dozen 2, which was filmed in the Muskoka Region of Ontario. Originally meant to be a non-speaking role, he ended up getting a couple of lines. He also appeared in the 2007 horror film Left for Dead. Amell had a role in the Canadian Family Channel series Life with Derek, playing lead character Casey McDonald's boyfriend Max. Life with Derek was distributed worldwide, including American Disney Channel and its international affiliates. He has also appeared in the ABC Family film Picture This. Amell had a recurring role on both the Nickelodeon series True Jackson, VP as Max Madigan's nephew Jimmy, True's love interest, and the Cartoon Network series Unnatural History.

He played the role of Noel Kahn's brother Eric on the ABC Family television series Pretty Little Liars during the show's third season. Amell has played hockey since he was a child and considered making a career of it until discovering his love of acting. He also takes breakdancing lessons. He had a recurring role on MTV's Zach Stone Is Gonna Be Famous. He was cast as Fred Jones in the 2009 television film Scooby-Doo! The Mystery Begins, which became the most watched telecast ever on Cartoon Network. He reprised the role in the 2010 sequel Scooby-Doo! Curse of the Lake Monster.

In 2013, Amell received his biggest role to date, lead character Stephen Jameson in CW's sci-fi drama The Tomorrow People, a remake of the British series of the same name. In May 2014, Amell joined The DUFF as Wesley. On July 9, 2014, Amell was cast as a major recurring character on the CW series The Flash as Ronnie Raymond / Firestorm in the first and third seasons, as well as Ronnie's evil counterpart Deathstorm in the second and eighth seasons.

In July 2015, Amell was cast in the tenth season of The X-Files as FBI Agent Miller. Amell starred alongside Kevin Spacey and Jennifer Garner in Nine Lives, which was released on August 5, 2016. In 2017, he co-starred in McG's horror film The Babysitter. He reprised his role in the 2020 sequel, The Babysitter: Killer Queen.

Amell starred in and executive produced the 2019 sci-fi action film Code 8, with Stephen Amell co-starring and also executive producing. The film, expanding on an earlier short, was funded by an Indiegogo campaign which raised over $2 million. He returned to star in and produce the 2024 sequel, Code 8: Part II.

From 2020-2025, Amell starred in Upload, a science fiction comedy series on Amazon Prime Video. Amell's performance was cited as a highlight of the series, particularly his chemistry with co-star Andy Allo and when playing dual roles in the third season.

== Personal life ==
Amell began dating actress Italia Ricci in July 2008 after meeting her while filming American Pie Presents: Beta House. The couple got engaged on August 20, 2014, and married on October 15, 2016. Amell and Ricci had their first child, a son, in 2019; they became dual Canadian/US citizens in January 2020 and reside in Toronto.

Amell was a fan of the Toronto Maple Leafs ice hockey team growing up, though since his move to Los Angeles, Amell has begun cheering for the Los Angeles Kings, but still calls Toronto his "second team". In a 2015 interview, Amell discussed his support for a second NHL team in Toronto via league expansion.

== Filmography ==
=== Film ===
Year	Title	Role	Notes
2005	Cheaper by the Dozen 2	Daniel Murtaugh	
2007	American Pie Presents: Beta House	Nick Anderson	Direct-to-video
2007	Left for Dead	Blair	
2009	The Alyson Stoner Project	VIP guest	
2012	Struck by Lightning	Justin Walker	
2013	The Hunters	Paxton Flynn	
2015	The DUFF	Wesley Rush	
2015	Max	Kyle Wincott	
2015	Anatomy of the Tide	Brad McManus	
2016	Code 8	Connor Reed	Short film; also executive producer
2016	Nine Lives	David Brand	
2016	ARQ	Renton	
2017	The Babysitter	Max	
2018	When We First Met	Ethan	
2019	Code 8	Connor Reed	Also producer
2020	Desperados	Jared	
2020	The Babysitter: Killer Queen	Max	
2020	Eat Wheaties!	Brandon	
2021	Resident Evil: Welcome to Raccoon City	Chris Redfield	
2023	Simulant	Evan	
2023	Float	Blake Hamilton	Also producer
2023	EXmas	Graham	
2024	Code 8: Part II	Connor Reed	Also producer
2025	Racewalkers	Ched Lester	

=== Television ===
Year	Title	Role	Notes
2006	Runaway	Stephen	2 episodes
2006–2008	Life with Derek	Max Miller	17 episodes
2008	Murdoch Mysteries	Wallace Driscoll	Episode: "Still Waters"
2008	Picture This	Drew Patterson	Television film
2008–2011	True Jackson, VP	Jimmy Madigan	Main role
2009	Scooby-Doo! The Mystery Begins	Fred Jones	Television film
2010	Unnatural History	Michael O'Malley	2 episodes
2010	Scooby-Doo! Curse of the Lake Monster	Fred Jones	Television film
2010	Destroy Build Destroy	Himself	Episode: "Scooby-Doo! Curse of the Lake Monster vs. Dude, What Would Happen"
2011	How I Met Your Mother	Nate "Scooby" Scooberman	2 episodes
2011	Brothers & Sisters	Young William Walker	Episode: "For Better or for Worse"
2011	CSI: NY	Riley Frazier	Episode: "Air Apparent"
2011–2012	Revenge	Adam Connor	4 episodes
2012	Alcatraz	Young Ray Archer	3 episodes
2012	Hornet's Nest	Andy Brazil	Television film
2012	Pretty Little Liars	Eric Kahn	Episode: "The Kahn Game"
2012	Hawaii Five-0	Billy Keats	Episode: "Popilikia"
2013	Hot in Cleveland	Lloyd	Episode: "The Conversation"
2013	1600 Penn	D.B.	7 episodes
2013	Zach Stone Is Gonna Be Famous	Nick	8 episodes
2013	The Hunters	Paxton Flynn	Television film
2013–2014	The Tomorrow People	Stephen Jameson	Main role
2014	Whose Line Is It Anyway?	Himself	Episode: "Robbie Amell"
2014–2017, 2022	The Flash	Ronnie Raymond / Firestorm, Deathstorm	Recurring role; 13 episodes
2015	Modern Family	Chase	Episode: "Closet? You'll Love It!"
2015	Chasing Life	Ecstasy Guy	Episode: "Wild Thing"; uncredited
2016–2018	The X-Files	Special Agent Kyd Miller	3 episodes
2018–2019	A Series of Unfortunate Events	Kevin	3 episodes
2020–2025	Upload	Nathan Brown	Lead role
2023	The Witcher	Gallatin	3 episodes

== Awards and nominations ==
Year	Award	Category	Nominated work	Result
2015	17th Teen Choice Awards	Choice Movie Actor: Comedy	The DUFF	Nominated
2015	17th Teen Choice Awards	Choice Movie: Liplock (shared with Mae Whitman)	The DUFF	Nominated
2021	1st Critics' Choice Super Awards	Best Actor in a Science Fiction/Fantasy Series	Upload	Nominated
