= Moe Jeudy-Lamour =

Canadian actor

- Born: Montreal, Quebec, Canada
- Occupation: Actor
- Years active: 2010–present

Moe Jeudy-Lamour is a Canadian film and television actor from Montreal, Quebec, best known for his role as Thierry Zoreaux / "Van Damme" on Ted Lasso.

He is of Haitian descent, and was raised as an Orthodox Jew in Montreal. He studied political science at Concordia University with the plan of going into law, but decided to pursue acting, a dream he had always felt to be unattainable, after unexpectedly meeting Orlando Jones while working at Future Shop.

He has also had supporting or guest roles in the films Barney's Version, Gerontophilia, Trailer Park Boys: Don't Legalize It, Race, King Dave and Bon Cop, Bad Cop 2, and the television series 19-2, Being Human, Unité 9, District 31 and Bad Blood, as well as roles on stage.
