= Horizon Forbidden West: Burning Shores =

2023 video game expansion pack

- Developer: Guerrilla Games
- Publisher: Sony Interactive Entertainment
- Director: Mathijs de Jonge
- Producer: Joel Eschler
- Programmer: Michiel van der Leeuw
- Artists: Jan-Bart van Beek; Misja Baas
- Writer: Annie Kitain
- Composers: Joris de Man; Niels van der Leest; Oleksa Lozowchuk; The Flight
- Series: Horizon
- Engine: Decima
- Platforms: PlayStation 5; Windows
- Release: PlayStation 5; 19 April 2023; Windows; 21 March 2024
- Genre: Action role-playing
- Mode: Single-player

Horizon Forbidden West: Burning Shores is a 2023 expansion pack for the 2022 action role-playing video game Horizon Forbidden West, developed by Guerrilla Games and published by Sony Interactive Entertainment. It is a direct epilogue to the main campaign. The expansion is set in a post-apocalyptic volcanic archipelago constructed from the seismically fractured ruins of Los Angeles. The narrative follows the Aloy as she travels south to pursue Walter Londra, a rogue member of the technologically advanced Far Zenith faction, before he can flee the planet. Along the way, she allies with Seyka, a marine from the seafaring Quen tribe.

The expansion introduces an explorable map that is roughly one-third the size of Forbidden West's. It raises the level cap to 60 and implements a specialised economy to acquire and upgrade equipment. The flooded archipelago environment features water-based and aerial exploration and introduces a skiff, dynamic thermal geysers for gliding, and the Waterwing, a flying machine that can be used as a mount capable of diving underwater. The player gains access to new combat abilities and weaponry. The campaign places a greater emphasis on cooperative encounters, frequently pairing Seyka with Aloy to assist in combat and puzzle-solving.

Burning Shores's narrative was designed to shift the focus toward Aloy's emotional growth and her ability to open up to others. Generating the dense city environments, high-speed aerial traversal, and cloud formations required updates to the Decima engine, which were made possible by dropping previous generation hardware constraints. Burning Shores was Forbidden West's only expansion pack and was released as downloadable content for the game for PlayStation 5 on 19 April 2023. It was later ported, along with the base game, to Windows by Nixxes Software on 21 March 2024 as part of the Complete Edition.

The expansion received generally favourable reviews from critics, who praised its visual presentation, technical achievements, and the evolving dynamic between Aloy and Seyka. However, opinions were more divided on the storyline of its primary antagonist and the execution of the final boss encounter against a reanimated Horus war machine. Burning Shores's optional same-sex kiss was the target of review bombing on Metacritic. GLAAD considered the romance as authentic representation, earning the expansion a nomination at the 35th GLAAD Media Awards.

== Gameplay ==
In this gameplay screenshot, a machine has weak points highlighted after being scanned by Aloy.

Burning Shores builds upon the action role-playing mechanics of Horizon Forbidden West (2022). It adds a new region that is accessible only to players who have completed the base game's main campaign. The expansion is set in a flooded volcanic archipelago constructed from the seismically fractured ruins of Los Angeles, and introduces an explorable region that is roughly one-third the size of the Forbidden West's map that provides around eight to ten hours of new gameplay. The landscape features water-based traversal using a boat known as a skiff, alongside dynamic aerial mechanics, such as thermal geysers that allow Aloy to use her glider to launch into the air. A concurrent patch improved accessibility by introducing a thalassophobia mode to assist players with a fear of deep water. The feature alters underwater environments by illuminating the seabed with a pink pulse and increasing ambient visibility, which prevents machines from appearing suddenly. It also disables the risk of drowning, allowing Aloy to remain submerged indefinitely.

The expansion increases the level cap to 60, and expands combat and progression mechanics, including the introduction of new abilities within Aloy's skill trees. These additions include temporary combat enhancements and an acrobatic grappling ability that allows Aloy to zip towards a downed enemy to land a critical blow. Burning Shores also introduces new weapons, armour, and equipment modificaitons. The expansion reduces the material requirements for upgrading legendary tier equipment, which lessens the grind for rare machine components compared to the base game. During Burning Shores's main storyline, there is a greater emphasis on cooperative encounters; Seyka, an allied companion, frequently joins Aloy to assist in combat by distracting and damaging machines. Seyka also assists the player with environmental puzzle-solving.

Burning Shores introduces four new machine types: the Waterwing, Bilegut, Stingspawn, and the Horus boss. The Waterwing can be used as a mount and is a flying machine similar to the base game's Sunwing, but with the added ability to dive beneath the water's surface. The Bilegut is an acid-spewing toad-like machine, while Stingspawn are small, flying insect-like machines that swarm in groups. The expansion's climax features a multi-stage boss fight against a fully active Horus "Metal Devil", an insectoid war machine that appeared only as dormant scenery previously. Rather than relying solely on standard combat, the encounter spans a large area, requiring environmental navigation and platforming to dismantle it. Burning Shores introduces new optional activities, including hostile outposts populated by Quen Devotees, a puzzle-focused explorable ruin, and a new underground technological facility that grants the ability to override the Bilegut. The player can also find new categories of collectibles that require exploring the environment and solving puzzles, including tracing ancient aerial flight paths, or recovering scavenger trinkets and theme park figurines.

== Synopsis ==
=== Setting ===
Burning Shores is set in a volcanic archipelago of the same name, formed from the submerged and seismically fractured ruins of Los Angeles. The region is characterised by volcanic activity, flowing lava, and a tropical climate. It is predominantly occupied by a splinter group of the seafaring Quen tribe, who were shipwrecked in the region after a storm separated them from their main fleet. The narrative is set immediately after the conclusion of Forbidden West, with Aloy seeking to eliminate the final surviving member of the antagonistic Far Zenith organisation before he can enact his own plans to escape the planet.

=== Plot ===
Following the defeat of the Far Zeniths, Sylens informs Aloy that a thirteenth member of the group, aerospace magnate Walter Londra, survived the assault and fled south to the Burning Shores. Aloy travels to the archipelago to track him down, but her flying machine is shot out of the sky by an active anti-air tower. Grounded, she encounters Seyka, a marine from the Quen tribe. Seyka guides Aloy to her settlement, Fleet's End, explaining that her people have been stranded since a storm separated them from their main expedition. The two agree to work together to disable the tower and locate a missing Quen scouting party. Their search is sanctioned by Admiral Gerrit because one of the missing crew members is Seyka's sister, Kina, who serves as the fleet's last remaining navigator.

Their investigation leads them to Londra's former headquarters in the ruins of Griffith Observatory. They discover that Londra is building a rocket to flee Earth and the impending arrival of the world-destroying entity Nemesis. He is salvaging experimental nuclear boosters that will irradiate the entire archipelago upon launch. Aloy and Seyka follow Londra's trail to a crumbling dinosaur theme park in Hollywood. They learn that Londra has used his charismatic 21st-century persona alongside ancient brainwashing technology to manipulate the missing Quen into worshipping him as a living god. He intends to take these loyal followers, particularly Kina, with him to found a new colony as a subservient workforce.

Aloy and Seyka infiltrate Londra's headquarters, where they encounter Nova, Londra's disgruntled artificial intelligence. Nova is weary of Londra's mistreatment, so it disables the compound's security measures in exchange for Aloy deleting her code. With the defences down, the Aloy and Seyka defeat Londra's loyalist enforcer and rescue the captive Quen. Londra retreats to his bunker beneath the Hollywood Sign and reactivates an ancient Horus war machine to eradicate them. Aloy and Seyka engage the Horus in a prolonged battle along the coast. When the machine begins to overheat, Aloy sabotages its cooling system, which forces it to retreat into the sea. She then breaches its hull and kills Londra and deactivates the Horus. Aloy then helps the Quen at Fleet's End make contact with their main fleet to coordinate their reunification. She also has the opportunity to start a romantic relationship with Seyka before parting ways. Aloy returns to her base and meets with Sylens, who has decrypted the data from Londra's augmented reality Focus. The data contains a list of 21st-century companies that were developing experimental weaponry that may be key to defeating Nemesis.

== Development ==
=== Concept and characters ===
Unlike the previous game's expansion, The Frozen Wilds, the developers designed Burning Shores to act as a direct epilogue to the base game rather than an optional side story. Narrative director Ben McCaw stated that the team had always envisioned Los Angeles as the setting for an expansion and had briefly considered including the location in the base game. Lead writer Annie Kitain explained that the visual of a dormant Horus perched over the Hollywood Sign was an early piece of concept art that the team felt they had to include in the final game. This allowed the team to continue Aloy's character arc, shifting her from bearing the burden of saving the world alone to exploring her emotions and opening up to others. McCaw explained this was a deliberate shift in the studio's strategy; whereas Aloy did not experience significant personal growth during The Frozen Wilds, the developers viewed Burning Shores as an opportunity to push her character forward and as a developmental "swan song" for the Forbidden West production cycle. Kitain added that the narrative focuses on the Quen tribe, whose limited ancient technology caused them to misinterpret ancient data and revere 21st-century corporate executives as a pantheon of gods.

The character of Seyka was designed to be an equal match for Aloy; her shared use of a Focus device was intended to act as a reflection of Aloy's own past and development. The narrative culminates in an optional dialogue choice where the player determines whether Aloy reciprocates Seyka's romantic feelings. Kitain and McCaw explained that regardless of the player's choice, Aloy's romantic feelings for Seyka remain canon. The dialogue options reflect Aloy's ongoing struggles with social contact due to her isolated upbringing and the challenges she faces ahead. Ashly Burch reprises her role as the voice of Aloy. Seyka is portrayed by Kylie Liya Page in her video game motion capture debut, while the antagonist, Walter Londra, is portrayed by Sam Witwer. Following the death of Lance Reddick in March 2023, who provided the voice and likeness for Sylens, an in-game memorial was added in a post-launch update.

=== Technology and design ===
Burning Shores was developed exclusively for the PlayStation 5. The expansion features technical enhancements to the proprietary Decima engine. Game director Mathijs de Jonge said that dropping previous generation hardware constraints allowed the team to "charge forward" with the Los Angeles cityscape. The console's enhanced processing power and solid-state drive permitted more detailed environments that render smoothly even at high flying speeds. It also enabled the developers to keep a specialised lighting setup on Aloy active during all standard gameplay, a feature previously restricted exclusively to cinematic cutscenes. The PS5's fast streaming capabilities also allowed settlements like Fleet's End to feature increased detail. This allowed for denser and more complex environments than the base game's towns. Guerrilla implemented a cloud rendering system to generate three-dimensional cloud formations. The transition to this advanced simulation allowed for realistic lighting interactions, such as water vapour occluding sunlight and light penetrating ragged cloud edges with a minimal impact on frame time. Principal FX artist Andrew Schneider and tech programmer Nathan Vos expanded on previous cloud systems so the player could fly through "Frankencloudscapes", large formations that act as both background elements and explorable environments that featured accurate white-out conditions and visibility changes. The system compresses volumetric data to render the clouds for faster memory access, and the developers optimised the game's code specifically for the PlayStation 5 to handle lighting at high frame rates.

The terrain was deliberately sculpted to be vertical. It features seas nestled between mountainous borders to make the environment more readable and visually striking from a distance during flight, which contrasted with the flatter terrain of Forbidden West. Concept artist Adriaan Stam designed the region's Quen settlements to reflect the tribe's strict hierarchy and reliance on 21st-century data and used salvaged shipwrecks integrated into the ruined Los Angeles geography. The final boss encounter against the Horus became the most complex machine the studio had ever developed. Senior creature animator David Vince revealed that it featured over a thousand more joints than the base game's most complex machine, the Slitherfang. Animating the large machine created a severe processing bottleneck; the developers implemented software optimisations to maintain stable frame rates during the sequence to manage the console's processing power. The Horus's animations were designed to evoke a "zombie" theme due to it being unnaturally reanimated after a millennium. The studio developed entirely new climbing technology to ensure Aloy's character model aligned naturally with the machine's constantly moving legs. Principal game designer Arne Oehme explained the multi-stage encounter was structured to test all of Aloy's core mechanics while emphasising the machine's massive scale before entering close-quarters combat.

=== Audio ===
The expansion's original score was a collaborative effort, with returning composers Joris de Man, Niels van der Leest, and the duo The Flight joined by Oleksa Lozowchuk to build out the soundscape. Lozowchuk composed specific encounter tracks including "Steel Snare" and "Titan's Wake", which featured guest vocals by Melissa R. Kaplan, while vocalist Julie Elven returned to provide vocals for atmospheric tracks like "To the Burning Shores" and "The Idea of Home".

=== Release ===
Burning Shores was announced at The Game Awards 2022 and released on 19 April 2023 only for the PlayStation 5. Sony bundled the main game with Burning Shores and re-released them for PlayStation 5 on 6 October 2023 as Horizon Forbidden West Complete Edition. The Complete Edition was later ported to Windows by Nixxes Software, and released on 21 March 2024.

== Reception ==
=== Critical response ===
Reception

Aggregate scores
Aggregator	Score
Metacritic	81/100
OpenCritic	88% recommend

Review scores
Publication	Score
Game Informer	8/10
GameSpot	7/10
IGN	8/10
Push Square	8/10
RPGFan	85/100
Video Games Chronicle	4/5
Hardcore Gamer	4/5
Inverse	8/10

Horizon Forbidden West: Burning Shores received "generally favourable" reception according to the review aggregator website Metacritic, while 88% of critics recommended the expansion according to OpenCritic. Critics highlighted the narrative focus and the introduction of Seyka, stating that the condensed format benefited the storytelling compared to the base game. Reviewers described the evolving dynamic between Aloy and Seyka as genuine that provided a necessary emotional core, calling it a meaningful expansion of the franchise's overarching narrative. The overarching plot concerning Walter Londra was met with mixed reactions. While some reviewers described his persona as charismatic and entertaining, others argued his motivations were clichéd and the storyline predictable; The A.V. Club's William Hughes criticised the narrative as "Horizon-by-numbers" and argued that it relied on predictable franchise tropes.

The transition to the PlayStation 5's hardware drew attention for its technical achievements. Digital Foundry's Oliver Mackenzie called the expansion a visual showcase, singling out the enhanced geometric density and the cloud rendering technology. Some reviewers emphasised the world-building and visual presentation and described the Los Angeles archipelago as an impressive environment to explore. Eurogamer's Vikki Blake wrote that the transformation of the ruined city into a sun-soaked oasis provided opportunities for the game's photo mode.

Some critics responded positively to the design of the new machines, such as the Bilegut, and the integration of environmental hazards like thermal geysers into tactical combat. Several reviewers argued that the gameplay suffered from returning issues and under used features. They cited the persistence of mechanical frustrations from the base game, including excessive puzzle hand-holding, irregular climbing mechanics, and errand-like quest design. Critics also wrote that certain areas of the map felt empty due to a relative lack of side content, and described the aerial exploration as sluggish.

The climax of the expansion was a frequent focal point of critiques. Reviewers cited the scale and scope of the multi-stage final boss encounter against the awakened Horus. GameSpot's Steve Watts described the encounter as a graphical and mechanical showpiece, and wrote that its grandiose set-piece design made the ending of the base game feel humble by comparison. Other critics felt that while the encounter provided a fantastic spectacle, with its actual execution feeling clunky and mundane. Kevin Dunsmore of Hardcore Gamer called the fight a "fantastic spectacle and engineering feat" but felt it fell flat due to a lack of "imagination and emergent gameplay".

Following its release, the expansion was subjected to a review bombing campaign on Metacritic by users objecting to the inclusion of LGBTQ+ themes, specifically the optional same-sex kiss between Aloy and Seyka. Metacritic issued a statement in response, and condemned the "abusive and disrespectful" user reviews and promised to implement stricter moderation tools. The LGBTQ+ media advocacy group GLAAD responded positively to the expansion for explicitly confirming Aloy's queer identity and called the romance a rare and encouraging example of authentic representation in blockbuster gaming.

=== Accolades ===
Burning Shores was nominated for the GLAAD Media Award for Outstanding Video Game at the 35th GLAAD Media Awards. At the 2024 Game Developers Choice Awards, it received honourable mentions for Best Narrative, Best Technology, and the Social Impact Award. The expansion was also nominated for the NYC GWB Award for Best DLC at the 2024 New York Game Awards.
