= Horizon Zero Dawn: The Frozen Wilds =

2017 video game expansion pack

- Developer: Guerrilla Games
- Publisher: Sony Interactive Entertainment
- Director: Mathijs de Jonge
- Producer: Lambert Wolterbeek Muller
- Artists: Jan-Bart van Beek; Misja Baas
- Writer: Ben McCaw
- Composers: Joris de Man; The Flight; Niels van der Leest; Jonathan Williams
- Series: Horizon
- Engine: Decima
- Platforms: PlayStation 4; Windows; PlayStation 5
- Release: PlayStation 4; 7 November 2017; Windows; 7 August 2020; PlayStation 5, Windows; 31 October 2024
- Genre: Action role-playing
- Mode: Single-player

Horizon Zero Dawn: The Frozen Wilds is an expansion pack for the 2017 action role-playing video game Horizon Zero Dawn, developed by Guerrilla Games and published by Sony Interactive Entertainment. The expansion is set concurrently with the main campaign, and follows Aloy as she travels to the homelands of the nomadic Banuk tribe in the Cut, a post-apocalyptic version of Yellowstone National Park. There, she investigates a mysterious entity known as the Daemon, which is corrupting the region's animal-like machines and making them more aggressive.

Integrated into the base game, the expansion raises the player level and introduces a new skill tree, weapons, and a specialised economy to purchase gear from the Banuk. Combat requires aggressive tactics to defeat the new Daemonic machine variants and the stationary Control Towers. Development focused on the culture of the Banuk tribe and drew geographical inspiration from Yellowstone. Guerrilla upgraded their proprietary Decima engine to feature a dynamic snow deformation system where snow compresses and forms trails, interactive water rendering, and an advanced 3D cloud rendering system. The studio also updated its motion capture technology to produce more realistic character animations. The new machine species were designed with erratic attack patterns to challenge established player strategies.

The Frozen Wilds is the sole expansion for Zero Dawn and launched for PlayStation 4 on 7 November 2017. It was later bundled with the base game for Windows in August 2020 as part of the Complete Edition, followed by a PlayStation 5 and Windows remaster in October 2024. The Frozen Wilds received generally favourable reviews. Critics praised its visual design, increased combat challenge, and technical enhancements, though the central narrative drew a more divided response. It was the fourth most-downloaded PlayStation 4 add-on of 2017.

== Gameplay ==
Aloy fighting a Scorcher, one of the new machine species introduced in the expansion

Building upon the action role-playing mechanics of Horizon Zero Dawn (2017), The Frozen Wilds is a single-player experience that adds a new region to the existing open world where the player controls Aloy as she travels back and forth between the two areas. Guerrilla tailored the expansion for players who have reached at least level 30 in the base game and it increases the maximum player level from 50 to 60. Exploration revolves around the culture of the Banuk, a tribe of survivalists; Aloy participates in their trials and combat challenges to eventually compete for the position of chieftain. A fourth branch added to the skill tree introduces quality-of-life abilities focused on inventory management and mounted traversal of machines. The region also introduces new iterations of base-game side activities, including a new fortified enemy outpost, an environmental navigation puzzle, and an explorable ruin, alongside new lore-based collectibles.

The expansion introduces a specialised economy centred on a rare crystalline resource used to trade for high-tier Banuk gear. This includes new weapons and Banuk-variant bows. The player can obtain new outfits and unlock the ability to upgrade Aloy's melee spear with modification slots. Daemonic machines are more formidable than the machines in the base game. They are corrupted variants that have more health, increased elemental resistances, and are immune to Aloy's ability to hack them. The expansion also introduces three new machine species: the Scorcher, Frostclaw, and Fireclaw. Control Towers, which are stationary devices that emit pulses to heal hostile machines, act as environmental hazards during combat and disable allied machines the player has hacked. The expansion features a difficulty spike from the base game, with encounters that emphasise using the new Banuk arsenal. It uses the dynamic, hidden dialogue system established in the base game, which adapts to the player's overall progression. Depending on whether a player plays The Frozen Wilds before, during, or after the events of the base game, Aloy's dialogue in both the expansion and Zero Dawn is adjusted to reflect her current understanding of the world's lore.

== Synopsis ==
=== Setting ===
The Frozen Wilds takes place in the Cut, a snow-covered mountainous region located beyond the northern edges of Zero Dawn's main map. It corresponds to a post-apocalyptic version of Yellowstone National Park. The region is predominantly inhabited by the Banuk, a nomadic tribe who are first encountered in the base game, and consist of survivalists and shamans who revere the blue light of the machines. The most prominent feature of the Cut is an active volcano known as Thunder's Drum. The narrative takes place concurrently with the events of Zero Dawn. It follows Aloy as she investigates a mysterious entity known as the Daemon. This entity has begun corrupting the region's machines to make them more aggressive and resilient, and has constructed stationary Control Towers that emit pulses of healing energy to aid hostile machines.

=== Plot ===
Aloy travels to the Cut to investigate after hearing rumours of dangerous new machines. She learns from the local Banuk chieftain, Aratak, that his sister Ourea, a prominent shaman, has disappeared after attempting to communicate with a Spirit she believes can stop the Daemon. Aloy tracks Ourea to an ancient facility that had been converted into a Banuk shrine. Ourea explains that the Spirit, which resides within a mountain facility called Thunder's Drum, has been silenced and overtaken by the Daemon. Aloy must first prove herself to gain the Banuk's support to assault the mountain. She challenges Aratak for leadership of his tribe, and after successfully defeating him in a hunting competition, she, Aratak, and Ourea ascend Thunder's Drum together. Throughout the journey, Aloy is periodically contacted by Sylens, her reluctant ally from the base game, who harbours his own secretive interests in acquiring the Daemon's advanced technology.

Inside Thunder's Drum, Aloy discovers the facility is Firebreak, an ancient project built to stabilise the Yellowstone Caldera and prevent a catastrophic eruption. The group learns that the Spirit is actually CYAN, an artificial intelligence (AI) designed to manage the facility. The Daemon is revealed to be HEPHAESTUS, a rogue terraforming AI. HEPHAESTUS views humanity as a threat to its machines, so it hijacks CYAN and Firebreak to construct a manufacturing facility that mass-produces hunter-killer machines. The group breaches the core of the facility to free CYAN from HEPHAESTUS's control. During the ensuing battle against the Daemonic machines, Ourea sacrifices herself to manually override the system. Her actions sever HEPHAESTUS's connection so CYAN can transfer its core systems to an auxiliary data centre at the Banuk shrine and initiate the destruction of the manufacturing facility. The Firebreak facility remains intact, and Aloy and Aratak narrowly escape the collapsing complex. Aloy returns to the shrine and reunites with the freed CYAN, who provides her with further information about the ancient past and HEPHAESTUS's motives, which leads to a final, heated exchange between Aloy and Sylens. Aratak resumes his role as chieftain of the tribe, and Aloy departs the Cut.

== Development ==
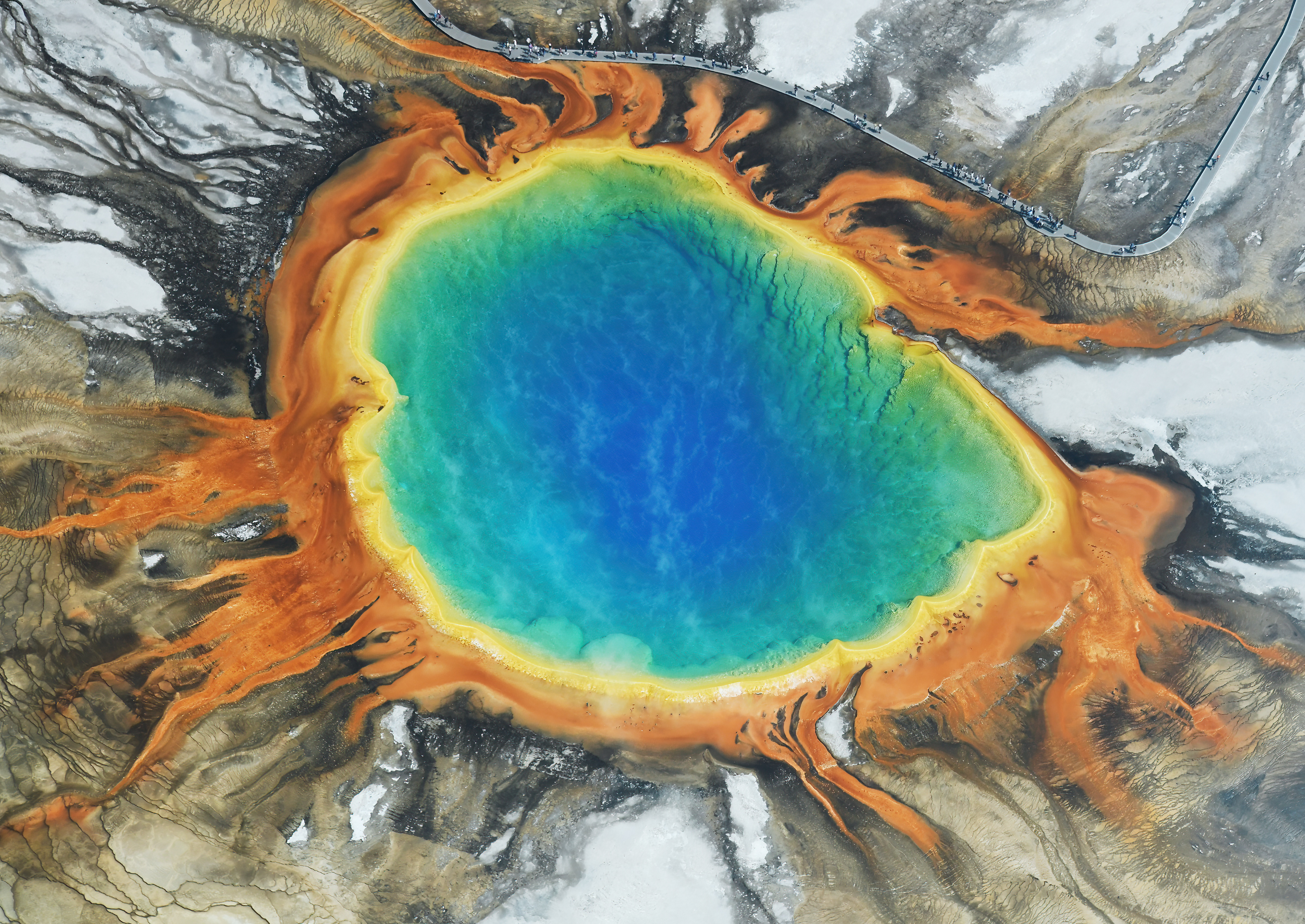
The geothermal pools of Yellowstone inspired the colour palette used for the Banuk tribe's garments.

The Frozen Wilds was developed by Guerrilla Games as the only expansion for Horizon Zero Dawn. Mathijs de Jonge served as the expansion's director, while Lambert Wolterbeek Muller acted as lead producer. Jan-Bart van Beek and Misja Baas oversaw the art direction. The development team focused the narrative on the Banuk tribe, who were perceived as one of the most mysterious factions in the base game. The developers were inspired by the geography of Yellowstone National Park, and used its colourful hydrothermal pools and mountainous terrain to design the environment of the Cut. When conceptualising the Banuk, the development team centred the tribe's culture in realistic survival strategies. Because the region's climate leaves them without the ability to farm, the developers established that their survival relies entirely on hunting, which requires a nomadic lifestyle that follows machine herds across the landscape. The designers took a practical approach to the tribe's attire to reflect this reality by prioritising functionality and realism over purely aesthetic choices. The colours woven into these garments mirror the bright hues of Yellowstone's prismatic springs to visually distinguish the Banuk from the game's other tribes. For the expansion's overarching narrative, lead writer Ben McCaw revealed that the science fiction film 2010 (1984) was a primary source of inspiration.

Guerrilla designed quests that combined narrative elements with environmental puzzles. A prominent example is the character of Gildun, an optimistic but clumsy treasure hunter from the Oseram tribe whom Aloy encounters in a ruined ancient dam. Quest designer Tim Stobo explained that Gildun was designed specifically to fit the mechanical needs of the quest, rather than vice versa. McCaw likened Gildun's personality to John Candy's character in the film Planes, Trains and Automobiles (1987), and conceptualised his character traits to justify the chain of mechanical failures the player must fix within the facility. The animation team added 108 additional joints to Gildun's character model to improve his cinematic appearances. This allowed for the realistic movement of his thick, fur-lined clothing. Based on player feedback of Zero Dawn, the team included more complex non-player characters (NPCs) with expanded dialogue, including Gildun.

The Frostclaw and Fireclaw were two of the new machines introduced in The Frozen Wilds, both of which are bear-like. The development team pitched the concept for a bear machine for the base game but scrapped it due to time constraints. When reviving the idea for the expansion, animators referenced footage of polar bears and red pandas to create the machines' distinct bipedal and quadrupedal movements, while the sound team mixed synthetic noises with the grunts of walruses and seals for their vocalisations. The The Frozen Wilds's soundtrack was composed by Joris de Man, The Flight, Niels van der Leest, and Jonathan Williams. Audio lead Bastian Seelbach's team designed distinct auditory cues for the Daemonic variants to match their aggressive, fast-paced attack patterns and differentiate them from base game machines. Lead designer Eric Boltjes stated that the team wanted to challenge the player by altering the combat patterns established in Zero Dawn. The Scorcher was designed with fast, erratic attack patterns to counter the "large creature, slow movement" encounters the player had previously learned to exploit. The team also tuned the AI to alter stealth mechanics; while the player was granted more leniency upon initial detection, it was made harder for them to fade back into hidden states.

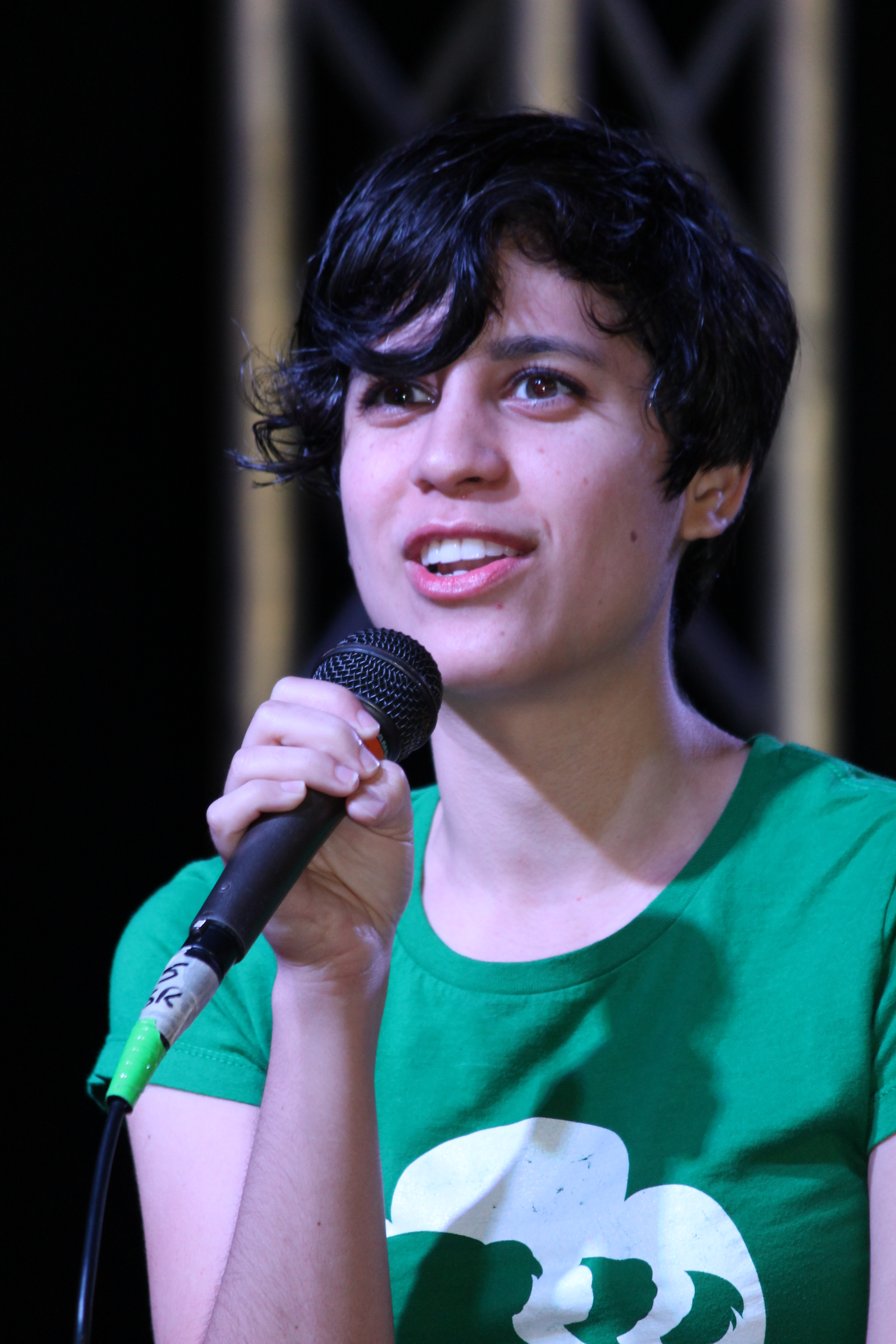
Ashly Burch (pictured in 2014) portrays Aloy.

The Frozen Wilds marked the first time Ashly Burch and Lance Reddick, who reprised their roles as Aloy and Sylens, respectively, recorded their dialogue together in the same studio. Despite starring in Zero Dawn together, the two had only previously recorded all of their lines separately. McCaw remarked that bringing them together in the booth for their heated exchanges during the expansion's climax allowed the actors to physically play off each other's performances. Guerrilla updated their motion capture technology to produce more natural facial animations and body movements compared to the base game. Burch took on full-body motion capture duties for Aloy for the first time. She studied in-game footage of the base game to replicate Aloy's walking and running animations. Burch recalled that her vocal recording sessions were physical, often pantomiming taking different types of elemental damage to produce authentic combat sounds.

Guerrilla updated their proprietary Decima engine to make the winter environment of the Cut more realistic. The studio developed a scalable, real-time snow deformation system that allowed thick snowdrifts to dynamically deform around the player, machines, and NPCs. This system exposed underlying grass textures when the powder was displaced to create a realistic layered effect. The expansion also introduced upgrades to the game's water rendering; freezing pools and rivers feature interactive icy layers that melt away when exposed to fire-based attacks during combat encounters, while a 3D cloud rendering system was introduced to create more dynamic skies. The engine blends six distinct pre-calculated lighting setups for different times of day, layering multiple lighting passes, including sky glow, local light sources, and reflections, to simulate the transition of sunlight. The snow technology introduced in the expansion was later retrofitted into the base game's environments for Horizon Zero Dawn Remastered (2024).

=== Release ===
Guerrilla announced The Frozen Wilds during E3 2017 and it was released worldwide for PlayStation 4 on 7 November 2017. A bundled version containing both the Zero Dawn and The Frozen Wilds, titled Horizon Zero Dawn Complete Edition, was released for the PlayStation 4 on 5 December. The Complete Edition was subsequently released for Windows on 7 August 2020, and Remastered, which also bundled the base game and its expansion, was released for PlayStation 5 and Windows on 31 October 2024.

== Reception ==
=== Critical response ===
Reception

Aggregate scores
Aggregator	Score
Metacritic	83/100
OpenCritic	85% recommend

Review scores
Publication	Score
Electronic Gaming Monthly	3/5
Game Informer	8/10
GameSpot	8/10
GamesRadar+	4/5
IGN	8.8/10
Polygon	8/10
Push Square	8/10
RPGFan	90/100

The Frozen Wilds received "generally favourable" reception according to the review aggregator website Metacritic, while 85% of critics recommended the expansion according to OpenCritic. Critics generally agreed that The Frozen Wilds was a worthwhile continuation of the base game, even if it did not introduce radically new mechanics. Reviewers wrote that the expansion closely adhered to the original game's formula. Several critics considered this a positive trait given the game's strong foundations. EGM's Josh Harmon felt this lack of innovation made the expansion feel "vestigial" rather than a must-play experience. Critics praised the expansion's visual enhancements and world design. Reviewers cited the wintry landscape of the Cut as a visually impressive and substantial addition to the open world. Zoe Delahunty-Light of GamesRadar+ appreciated the "breathtaking" environment, while Sammy Barker of Push Square felt the snowy setting offered a refreshing change of pace. Writing for GameSpot, Peter Brown admired the environmental lighting and the colourful hues of the snow. Tech-focused critiques commended the expansion's performance enhancements, specifically citing the new dynamic snow deformation systems and the improvements made to character facial animations during dialogue sequences.

Reviewers found that the new combat encounters and machine types introduced a renewed challenge to the game's combat. Critics singled out the new Daemonic machine variants for restoring the tension of the base game's early hours. IGN's Lucy O'Brien wrote that these variants made the wilderness feel genuinely untamed, while Harmon appreciated that the heightened challenge forced the player to use their entire arsenal of weapons and traps rather than relying on brute force. The addition of the new skill tree was recognised for introducing upgrades that improved exploration and inventory management, though RPGFan categorised these as basic quality-of-life fixes rather than essential new mechanics. Reviewers also enjoyed the new side quests, stating they were challenging and offered better rewards than those in the base game.

The response to The Frozen Wilds's narrative was mixed. The expansion's storyline and its exploration of themes like faith and religion received praise for the depth added to the lore of the Banuk tribe. Taking a more critical view of the tribe's depiction, Holly Green of The A.V. Club argued that the expansion uncomfortably appropriated Native American cultures and relied on the "white saviour" trope. She also felt the game problematically framed the Banuk's beliefs as primitive. Chris Plante of Polygon appreciated the continued characterisation of Aloy, particularly her consistently unbothered attitude, though he argued that integrating the expansion's story could feel awkward depending on when the player starts the expansion. Other critics described the central plot as underwhelming because the condensed mystery did little to expand the universe or push the overarching narrative forward. Game Informer's Jeff Marchiafava concluded that although the expansion's core narrative did not quite match the impact of the original story, it successfully retains the fundamental strengths of the game.

=== Sales ===
Sony did not release standalone sales figures for The Frozen Wilds; however, it was the second most-downloaded PlayStation 4 add-on during its launch month of November 2017, trailing only the Season Pass for Call of Duty: WWII. It finished as the fourth most-downloaded PlayStation 4 add-on of 2017 on the PlayStation Store, trailing Call of Duty: Black Ops III (2015) – Zombies Chronicles, the Destiny 2 Expansion Pass, and the Call of Duty: WWII Season Pass.
