= Horizon (video game series) =

Video game franchise

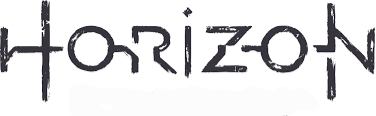
- Genre: Action role-playing
- Developers: Primary: Guerrilla Games (Note: Horizon Zero Dawn, Horizon Forbidden West, Horizon Call of the Mountain (with Firesprite), Lego Horizon Adventures (with Studio Gobo), and Horizon Hunters Gathering); Firesprite (Note: Horizon Call of the Mountain (with Guerrilla Games)); Studio Gobo (Note: Lego Horizon Adventures (with Guerrilla Games)); NC (Note: Horizon Steel Frontiers); Ports and Remaster: Virtuos (Note: Horizon Zero Dawn Complete Edition for Windows); Nixxes Software (Note: Horizon Forbidden Complete Edition (with Guerrilla Games) for Windows and Horizon Zero Dawn Remastered (with Guerrilla Games))
- Publishers: Sony Interactive Entertainment; NC (Note: Horizon Steel Frontiers)
- Creator: Jan-Bart van Beek
- Producers: Lambert Wolterbeek Muller; Joel Eschler; Angie Smets
- Artists: Jan-Bart van Beek; Misja Baas; Rob Sutton; Roy Postma; Paul Ayliffe
- Writers: List: Ben McCaw; Ben Schroder; Anne Toole; Annie Kitain; Ariadna Martinez; Nick van Sameren Brand; Emil Cholich; Laura Young; Lisa Witmond
- Composers: Joris de Man; The Flight; Niels van der Leest; Jonathan Williams; Oleksa Lozowchuk; Homay Schmitz
- Platforms: PlayStation 4 PlayStation 5 Microsoft Windows; Nintendo Switch; Android iOS
- First release: Horizon Zero Dawn; 28 February 2017
- Latest release: Lego Horizon Adventures; 14 November 2024

Horizon is a science fiction franchise set in a 4th millennium post-apocalyptic version of the United States. It primarily consists of action role-playing games. The franchise consists of two main games, Horizon Zero Dawn (2017) and Horizon Forbidden West (2022). The series also includes two spin-offs; Horizon Call of the Mountain (2023), a virtual reality game, and Lego Horizon Adventures (2024), a family-friendly retelling of Zero Dawn. The franchise also includes adaptations into comic books, Lego sets and tabletop games. Upcoming entries in the series include Horizon Steel Frontiers, an MMORPG, and Horizon Hunters Gathering, a cooperative multiplayer game, alongside a feature film adaptation of Zero Dawn currently in development. The narrative follows Aloy, a young tribe huntress. She attempts to uncover the secrets of the ancient past and stop recurring evolving threats.

The gameplay revolves around exploring an open world where nature has reclaimed the ruins of human civilisation, which is now overrun by animal-like machines. The player hunts and battles these machines using stealth and tribal weaponry, aided by an augmented reality device called a Focus. They must also navigate conflicts between human tribal societies. The series originated from a concept by art director Jan-Bart van Beek. It is predominately developed by Guerrilla Games and published by Sony Interactive Entertainment. Horizon was originally developed as an exclusive for PlayStation consoles, but the franchise has since expanded to include releases on Microsoft Windows and Nintendo Switch, and soon on mobile platforms.

The franchise has received mostly positive critical and commercial reception, and won numerous industry awards, particularly for its tactical combat, worldbuilding, and visual fidelity. Scholars have also analysed the games' environmental ethics and focus on the symbiosis between humanity and nature. As of November 2025, the franchise has sold over 40 million units worldwide, making it one of Sony's best-selling first-party properties.

== Media ==
=== Video games ===
Release timeline Main installments in bold text
2017	**Zero Dawn**
2017	The Frozen Wilds
2018
2019
2020
2021
2022	**Forbidden West**
2023	Call of the Mountain
2023	Burning Shores
2024	Zero Dawn Remastered
2024	Lego Horizon Adventures
TBA	Steel Frontiers
TBA	Hunters Gathering

==== Main series ====
Horizon Zero Dawn was first released in North America on 28 February 2017, in Europe, Australia, and New Zealand on 1 March, and Asia on 2 March for PlayStation 4. The game follows Aloy, a young Nora tribe outcast in a post-apocalyptic United States overrun by animalistic machines. She seeks answers about her origins and discovers she is a clone of Elisabet Sobeck, a 21st-century scientist. She learns that the old world was destroyed by a plague of self-replicating military robots created by Faro Automated Solutions, which prompted Sobeck to create "Project Zero Dawn", an artificial intelligence (AI) system led by GAIA designed to restore life to Earth. Aloy is aided by a mysterious ally named Sylens and she must fight a cult called the Eclipse to stop a rogue AI subfunction named HADES from triggering another mass extinction.

Horizon Zero Dawn: The Frozen Wilds is an expansion pack for Zero Dawn and was released on 7 November 2017. Aloy travels to a snowy region known as the Cut to investigate a new threat called the Daemon, which is corrupting the local machines. She enlists the help of the local Banuk tribe and their shaman, Ourea, to reach a ruined volcanic facility within Thunder's Drum. Inside, she discovers the Daemon is HEPHAESTUS, another rogue subfunction of GAIA, and must stop it from taking over CYAN, an ancient AI responsible for governing the Yellowstone Caldera.

Horizon Forbidden West was released on 18 February 2022 for PlayStation 4 and PlayStation 5. It is set six months after Zero Dawn. Aloy travels to the western coast of the United States to investigate a deadly blight that threatens to destroy the Earth. She clashes with the Far Zeniths, a group of technologically advanced humans who fled Earth a millennium ago and have returned to steal a copy of GAIA. Aloy allies with her friends, local tribes, and her newly discovered cloned sister, Beta, to wipe out the Zeniths. Aloy and her allies learn that the Zeniths were actually fleeing an even greater threat: Nemesis, a vengeful, world-ending AI that destroyed the Zenith colony and is now on its way to Earth.

Horizon Forbidden West: Burning Shores is an expansion pack for Forbidden West. It was released exclusively for PlayStation 5 on 19 April 2023. Aloy travels to the volcanic ruins of Los Angeles to track down Walter Londra, the sole surviving member of Far Zenith. She teams up with a Quen marine named Seyka and discovers that Londra has brainwashed a group of stranded Quen into a cult to help him rebuild a ship to flee Earth at the expense of the local population. Aloy defeats him within a reactivated large Horus machine, and begins preparing for the arrival of Nemesis.

==== Spin-offs ====
Horizon Call of the Mountain was released on 22 February 2023 as a launch title for PlayStation VR2 headset and was co-developed by Guerrilla Games and Firesprite. The game follows Ryas, a disgraced former Shadow Carja rebel who is offered a pardon in exchange for investigating a surge in machine aggression within the Sundom. Ryas discovers that a rogue Oseram engineer named Asera has constructed lures to lead an army of machines into a direct assault on the Carja capital of Meridian. Ryas eventually finds his missing brother, Urid, and stops Asera's revenge plot, which earns his freedom.

Lego Horizon Adventures was released on 14 November 2024 for PlayStation 5, Windows, and Nintendo Switch. It was co-developed by Guerrilla and Studio Gobo in collaboration with The Lego Group. The game is an alternate, family-friendly retelling of the events of Zero Dawn featuring Lego aesthetics and cooperative multiplayer. Aloy is joined by her allies Varl, Teersa, and Erend as they battle sun-worshipping cultists led by Helis and a mysterious red orb entity seeking to corrupt the world's machines. The game downplays Zero Dawn's apocalyptic lore. It instead uses slapstick humour.

Horizon Steel Frontiers is an upcoming free-to-play MMORPG developed and published by NC for Windows, Android, and iOS. It was announced in November 2025 and is set in a new southern region called the Deadlands, which is inspired by Arizona and New Mexico. Gameplay centres on machine hunting and faction-based combat, as well as character customisation. It is the first game in the series not to be released on a PlayStation console and is planned to be released in the first half of 2027.

Horizon Hunters Gathering is an upcoming cooperative action game announced on 5 February 2026 and is currently in development by Guerrilla for PlayStation 5 and Windows. The game is set after the events of Forbidden West, and allows up to three players to team up as machine hunters to complete missions. The game features a stylised, cartoonish art direction, a roguelite perk system for character builds, and a narrative campaign designed around team-based tactics.

==== Complete editions and remaster ====
Horizon Zero Dawn Complete Edition bundles Zero Dawn with The Frozen Wilds and the "Digital Deluxe Edition" items. It was released for PlayStation 4 on 5 December 2017, and ported to Windows via Steam and Epic Games Store on 7 August 2020 and GOG on 24 November.

Horizon Forbidden West Complete Edition bundles Forbidden West with Burning Shores. It was released for PlayStation 5 on 6 October 2023, and ported to Windows on 21 March 2024.

Horizon Zero Dawn Remastered was released for PlayStation 5 and Windows on 31 October 2024, and co-developed by Guerrilla and Nixxes Software. The remaster includes graphical improvements designed to match Forbidden West, which includes improvements like updated character models and lighting, alongside over ten hours of re-recorded dialogue with new motion capture data. It also includes support for the DualSense controller's haptic feedback and Forbidden West's expanded accessibility options, which introduced new haptic and audio cues for interactable elements.

==== Other appearances ====
The series is also referenced in other video games. Aloy appears as a playable character in the PlayStation 4 version of Monster Hunter: World (2018), and makes a cameo appearance in Astro's Playroom (2020) and in Astro Bot (2024), which has a full level based on Horizon. Aloy was added to Fortnite Battle Royale (2017) on 15 April 2021, for the Chapter 2, Season 6 "Primal" event. That September, Aloy was given out as a free character for PS4 and PS5 players of Genshin Impact (2020), while players on other platforms received her for free in October. In December, Aloy was added to Fall Guys (2020) as an unlockable costume during a limited-time event.

=== Other media and adaptations ===
The Horizon universe was adapted into a comic book series published by Titan Comics beginning with the release of the four-issue miniseries, Horizon Zero Dawn: The Sunhawk in 2020. The story is set after the events of Zero Dawn and follows the newly appointed Sunhawk, Talanah who is struggling to find her purpose after Aloy vanishes. Talanah leaves Meridian on a contract to hunt a new breed of machine: a black-armoured Clawstrider. She allies with a Carja hunter named Amadis to battle the machines and a mercenary group. The comic bridges the gap to Forbidden West by introducing new machines and characters that appear in the game. A second four-issue miniseries, Horizon Zero Dawn: Liberation, was released between July 2021 and January 2022. It is set during the events of Zero Dawn and the story follows Aloy and Erend as they hunt for Korl, an Oseram assassin responsible for murdering a merchant and is linked to the death of Erend's sister, Ersa. The narrative frames Erend recounting the "Liberation of Meridian" where he details Ersa's escape from Carja captivity and the unification of the Oseram and Carja resistance. The comics were co-created and written by Anne Toole, one of the writers for Zero Dawn.

A licensed cooperative tabletop game, called Horizon Zero Dawn: The Board Game was announced in August 2018 by Steamforged Games. The game was funded on Kickstarter in less than two hours and released in 2020. The first expansion, called "The Sacred Land", released in September 2021. Steamforged partnered with Sony again for a second game based on Forbidden West called Seeds of Rebellion, which was funded via Kickstarter in November 2023. The game explores never before-seen canon events leading up to the game. In late 2025, Magic: The Gathering released six cards based around Forbidden West as part of their Secret Lair Drops.

==== Cancelled Netflix series ====
In May 2022, it was announced that a live action Horizon television series was in development at PlayStation Productions and Sony Pictures Television for Netflix, with Steve Blackman writing and producing the series under his Irish Cowboy production banner. Aloy was expected to be the main character. By January 2024, writing was underway. The series was no longer moving forward by that June after a January 2023 human resources complaint was made public, in which twelve former The Umbrella Academy (2019–2024) writers and support staffers accused Blackman of "toxic, bullying, manipulative, and retaliatory behavior".

==== Feature film ====
In January 2025, Sony announced that a film adaptation of Zero Dawn was in the works at PlayStation Productions and Columbia Pictures. That October, in a statement filed as part of a lawsuit against Tencent, PlayStation Productions president Asad Qizilbash stated that the company had a working script and they were searching for a director. The studio was also planning to start shooting the film in 2026 for a release in 2027.

==== Lego sets ====
Parts of various games in the series have also been adapted into Lego sets, including one of a 'Tallneck', which is one of the series various robotic antagonists known as machines.

== Gameplay ==
The Horizon series primarily consists of action role-playing games played from a third-person perspective. Spin-off titles have adapted the franchise into different genres and viewpoints; Call of the Mountain is a virtual reality experience played from a first-person perspective, while Lego Horizon Adventures features a fixed isometric perspective with two-player cooperative multiplayer. The games are set in a post-apocalyptic world populated by animalistic, robotic creatures known as machines. In the mainline entries, the environment can be freely explored, and the player uses a wearable augmented reality device called a Focus to scan, which reveals machine vulnerabilities, patrol paths, and hidden objects. The player uses a combination of ranged weapons, including bows and slingshots, alongside melee attacks with a spear. As the series progressed, melee combat was revamped to integrate smoothly with ranged attacks, alongside the introduction of new weapon types. Combat involves tactical hunting; the player must aim for specific machine components to disable attacks or remove protective armour. The player also engages hostile human factions. In Call of the Mountain, encounters confine the player to designated arenas on a locked track, which requires them to dodge attacks and draw their bow using motion controllers. Lego Horizon Adventures simplifies these mechanics into linear sequences interspersed with environmental hazards. In the mainline games, the player can also deploy traps, lay tripwires, and tether larger enemies to the ground to restrict their movement.

The player uses stealth to avoid detection and hide in tall foliage. This also allows them to ambush enemies. They can use their spear to hack machines to turn them into temporary allies or ridable mounts. Exploring the underground ruins unlocks the ability to hack a more machines species. The player navigates the world by completing missions assigned by non-player characters (NPCs) to progress the story or earn rewards. The open world contains optional activities, including clearing hostile encampments and completing timed hunting trials. New traversal and mobility items were added in Forbidden West. Items include a grappling hook and a glider. The game added motorised boats and flying mounts capable of diving underwater. Call of the Mountain requires the player to simulate mountain climbing using their hands and tools.

The player earns experience points to unlock new skills by completing tasks and defeating enemies. The skill trees expanded across the franchise to encompass new categories, which allow the player to tailor their abilities towards specific playstyles. Skillful play rewards combat points used to trigger special abilities. The player uses resources gathered from defeated machines to craft ammunition, traps, and healing potions. The series features a tiered loot system where rarer machine parts are required to purchase and upgrade higher-tier weaponry and outfits. Lego Horizon Adventures uses a central hub village that the player can customise using collected Lego bricks to unlock new outfits and decorations between missions.

The upcoming Horizon Steel Frontiers is a mobile-first MMORPG and adapts the franchise's traditional ranged combat into a touchscreen-focused melee system. Horizon Hunters Gathering introduces a roguelite progression system built around three-player online cooperative missions. Players defend social hubs through wave-based survival modes and dungeon gauntlets.

== Series development ==
=== Mainline entries ===
Following the release of Killzone 3 in 2011, Amsterdam-based studio Guerrilla Games began to conceptualise their next project. The studio's leadership sought a shift away from the dystopian tone of the Killzone franchise, while Sony Interactive Entertainment wanted to add a Western role-playing game to its lineup. From a pool of roughly 40 internal pitches, the team selected a concept by art director Jan-Bart van Beek that was defined by three core pillars: nature, robotic dinosaurs, and a strong female protagonist. Development began with a small prototyping team of 10 to 20 people before the remainder of the studio joined after completing Killzone Shadow Fall in late 2013. Zero Dawn required a budget of over €45 million and a team of roughly 270 internal employees, supplemented by 18 outsourcing studios, which included Singapore-based Virtuos and Serbian studio 3Lateral.

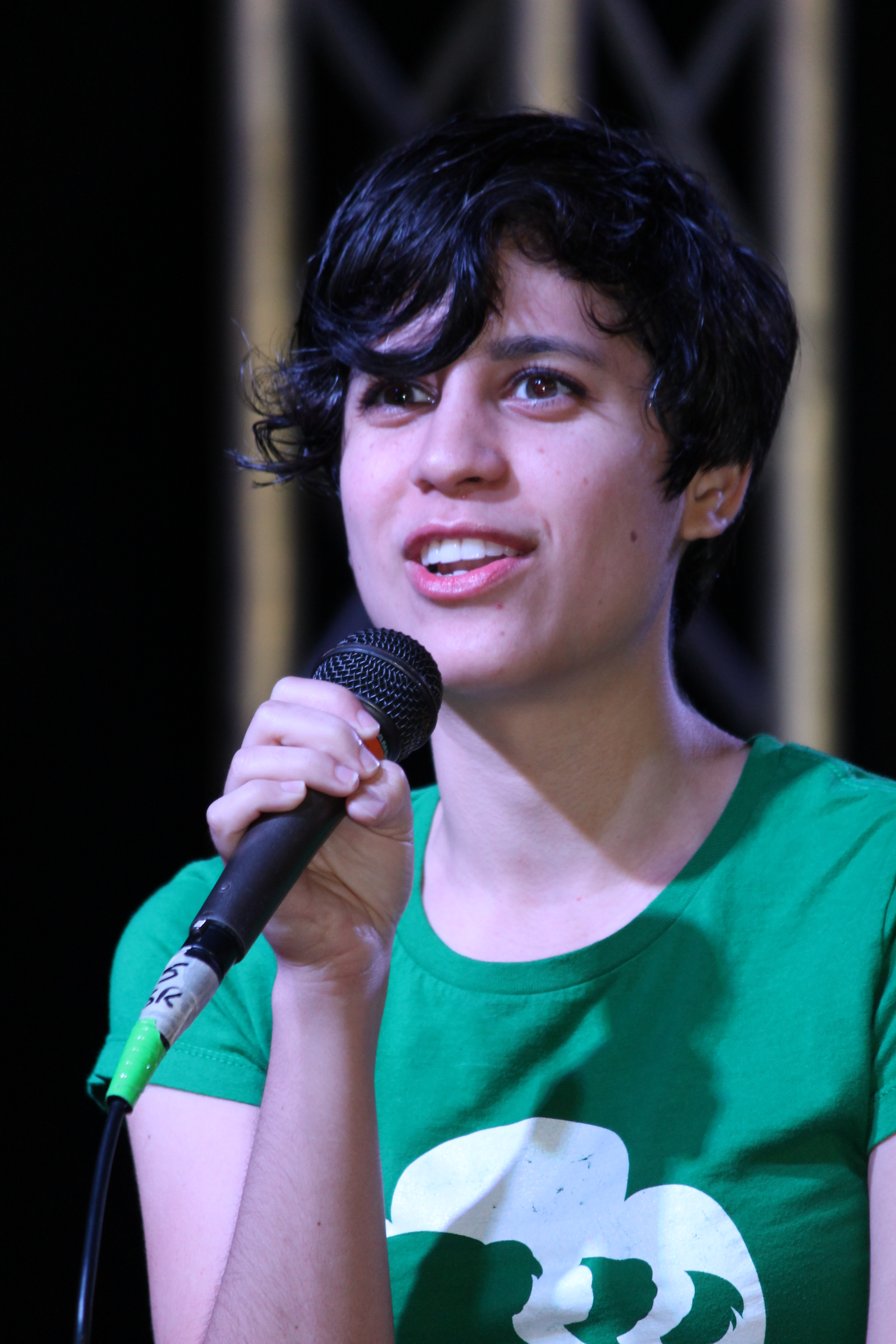
Ashly Burch (pictured in 2014) portrays Aloy.

With the transition from linear shooters to an open world format, Guerrilla avoided complex role-playing statistics to retain accessibility. Early prototypes equipped Aloy with a rifle, but developers replaced it with tribal weaponry to better align with the naturalistic setting. The developers designed Aloy as a capable survivor to provide the player with a grounded perspective, and avoided industry tropes of oversexualised female characters. Market testing revealed her early design possessed what developers described as a "Disney Princess" quality; the art team then spent two years working on her concept art to make her look older and more authentic in survivalism. Her visual likeness was modelled on Dutch actress Hannah Hoekstra, while American actress Ashly Burch provided her vocal performance.

Guerrilla modified their proprietary engine, naming it Decima in 2016, to generate the game's world. The engine used procedural generation for foliage and rivers alongside hand-crafted rock formations, and was managed by a system of data maps that tracked changing environmental conditions. Guerrilla collaborated with anthropologists and researched the formation of tribal cultures to build the game world. Jared Diamond's books Guns, Germs, and Steel (1997) and Collapse: How Societies Choose to Fail or Succeed (2005) were the team's main sources of inspiration. The characters in the games mostly speak plain English despite being set centuries in the future, as the team wanted to avoid jargon to retain accessibility. The audio team developed an approach they dubbed "natural-fiction" for the audio design. Zero Dawn's composers Joris de Man, The Flight, and Niels van der Leest, avoided traditional sci-fi blockbuster tropes in favour of an organic soundscape. They blended unconventional acoustic instruments, including sparse cellos and contrabass flutes, with synthesised, circuit-bent sounds to reflect the contrast between primitive tribes and advanced machinery.

The art team designed the machines based on their functional ecological roles. They consulted with robotics engineers from the Delft University of Technology to determine how practical robotic anatomy would be constructed. The engineers recommended an exoskeleton-like approach rather than traditional internal skeletons. This provided visual durability and logical weak points for combat. Animators studied wildlife documentaries to ensure the movements closely resembled real animal motion. The Tyrannosaurus rex-inspired Thunderjaw was the franchise's initial proof of concept. It took 18 months to develop it from a sketch to a functional in-game model. The combat and stealth mechanics were designed to simulate a hunt, with enemy AI programmed to be lenient upon initial detection, but difficult to evade once fully engaged.

Development on Forbidden West began in 2018. Guerrilla relocated to a new five-story studio space in Amsterdam in August 2020, which allowed them to accommodate the franchise's expanding scope. They also expanded their internal workforce to 360 employees by mid-2021. Production cost approximately US$212 million. The studio delayed the release to 2022 to accommodate production disruptions caused by the COVID-19 pandemic and to avoid implementing mandatory overtime. Ben McCaw stepped into the role of narrative director as the lore expanded. He centred the sequel's story around the pressure Aloy faced living up to her predecessor's legacy and introduced the clone, Beta, as a sullen, isolated counterpart of Aloy. Forbidden West also expanded its cinematic casting by including Carrie-Anne Moss and Angela Bassett.

The studio improved player traversal in the sequel by introducing underwater exploration and aerial mounts. Guerrilla initially focused on maximising the visual fidelity of the PlayStation 5 before dedicating resources to ensure parity on the PlayStation 4. The limitations of the older hardware proved challenging as developers nearly removed the aerial mechanics because they worried that the PlayStation 4 could not stream the environments fast enough to support the feature. Lead character artist Bastien Ramisse increased the character models' polygon density to take advantage of the PlayStation 5 hardware, which allowed for enhanced facial capture accuracy and the rendering of vellus hair. Guerrilla updated the Decima engine to transition to the open-source Jolt physics engine and to implement a rendering system that generated three-dimensional cloud formations.

Designers refined the combat by overhauling the skill trees and introducing Valor Surges to support different playstyles. The AI of human enemies was programmed to be more aggressive, and the encounters of the first game were integrated by allowing enemy factions to commandeer and ride machines into battle. Guerrilla established a dedicated team to implement over 80 settings to improve accessibility, which included a Co-Pilot control system, custom difficulty options, and toggles for tinnitus audio effects. The audio design also expanded to match the diverse cultures; composer Oleksa Lozowchuk joined returning composers Joris de Man, The Flight, and Niels van der Leest, and wrote acoustic and percussive themes to differentiate tribes.

Sony moved away from strict console exclusivity by porting the mainline games to Windows. Guerrilla partnered with Virtuos to adapt Zero Dawn for PC in 2020. Sony subsequently acquired Nixxes Software in 2021 to help with their PC releases; Nixxes handled the PC port of Forbidden West and co-developed Horizon Zero Dawn Remastered.

In April 2023, following a series of management changes at the studio, Guerrilla confirmed that a third mainline entry continuing Aloy's story was in development. In February 2026, Kotaku reported that the game was still multiple years away from release, as the studio's primary development resources had been allocated to work on Hunters Gathering.

=== Story expansions ===
Guerrilla developed The Frozen Wilds to expand on the base game's Banuk tribe. The designers drew geographical inspiration from Yellowstone National Park and used its hydrothermal pools to contrast the snowy environments. The studio upgraded the Decima engine to process real-time snow deformation and interactive water rendering. The team integrated narrative with environmental puzzles when designing the quests; for example, the character of Gildun was built specifically to justify a chain of mechanical failures that the player must fix within a ruined dam. Developers altered the enemy AI to increase the difficulty of stealth mechanics to force the player to commit to initiated combat encounters. Animators referenced footage of polar bears and red pandas for the movements of the new machines, while the sound team mixed synthetic noises with walrus and seal vocalisations. The team used player feedback and focused on NPC interactions. They overhauled their cinematic motion capture technology and recorded actors Burch and Lance Reddick together in the studio. The expansion also marked the first time Burch performed full-body motion capture for Aloy. She studied Zero Dawn footage to replicate the character's traversal animations.

The Burning Shores dropped PlayStation 4 support. This allowed the developers to use the PlayStation 5's solid-state drive for fast aerial streaming and enabled the construction of dense city environments within the ruins of Los Angeles. The console's enhanced processing power allowed developers to keep a specialised lighting setup active on Aloy during all standard gameplay, a feature previously restricted to cinematic cutscenes. Volumetric cloud formations that the player could fly through were introduced in Burning Shores, which required low-level code optimisations to handle the lighting calculations. The expansion's final boss, a reanimated Horus machine, was built with over a thousand more articulation joints than the base game's machines. The fight required new climbing technology to ensure Aloy's character model aligned with the moving components. Developers also introduced the Waterwing, a flying machine capable of diving underwater to allow the player to navigate the flooded archipelago. A thalassophobia mode was also added to assist players with a fear of deep water.

=== Standalone games ===
Guerrilla partnered with Firesprite for Call of the Mountain. Unlike the mainline entries, the game was developed using Epic Games' Unreal Engine 4 to demonstrate the hardware capabilities of the PlayStation VR2. Developers used the headset's eye-tracking in conjunction with foveated rendering to allocate processing power and maintain visual fidelity. The shift to a first-person perspective altered the perception of scale, so the team had to remodel and reanimate the machines for close-quarters combat. The developers incorporated haptic feedback into the controllers and headset to increase player immersion and to simulate the sensory impact of the machines walking nearby. The team conceptualised a gesture-based arm-swinging traversal scheme as an alternative movement option to reduce motion sickness and improve player comfort.

Guerrilla collaborated with Studio Gobo and The Lego Group to develop Lego Horizon Adventures. The game was built in Unreal Engine 5. Developers constructed the in-game assets from individual digital Lego bricks to replicate and animate the characters in a stop motion style. The writers tried to make the franchise approachable for newcomers, hiring comedy writer Mark Llabres Hill to adapt the tone by leaning into slapstick humour. The game featured returning voice actors from the mainline games; Ashly Burch as Aloy, JB Blanc as Rost, John Macmillan as Varl, and John Hopkins as Erend. Tim Russ was cast to voice Sylens following Lance Reddick's death in March 2023. The game was released for PlayStation 5, Windows, and Nintendo Switch. Narrative director James Windeler explained that the Switch port aligned with their goal of reaching a broader audience and that the Switch's simple control scheme made it a "natural fit".

The upcoming Steel Frontiers is co-developed with South Korean developer NC. The game is being built in Unreal Engine 5 to optimise the large-scale multiplayer environment for mobile devices. It replaces the single-player aspect of the franchise with a player versus environment structure inspired by the Monster Hunter series. The game is set in the Deadlands, a region inspired by the Southwestern United States. Hunters Gathering is being directed by Arjan Bak. It will return the series to the Decima engine and uses a stylised art direction instead of photorealism.

== Reception ==
=== Critical response ===
Aggregate review scores
Game	Year	Metacritic	OpenCritic
Zero Dawn	2017 (PS4); 2020 (Win)	89/100; 84/100	94% recommend 91% recommend
The Frozen Wilds	2017 (PS4)	83/100	85% recommend
Forbidden West	2022 (PS5, PS4); 2024 (Win)	88/100; 83/100; 89/100	96% recommend 90% recommend
Burning Shores	2023 (PS5)	81/100	88% recommend
Call of the Mountain	2023 (PS5)	79/100	78% recommend
Zero Dawn Remastered	2024 (PS5, Win)	85/100; 86/100	89% recommend
Lego Horizon Adventures	2024 (PS5, Win, Switch)	70/100; 66/100; 64/100	54% recommend

The Horizon franchise is one of Sony's best-selling first-party properties. By November 2025, the series had sold over 40 million units worldwide. Zero Dawn became one of the best-selling PlayStation 4 games with over 24.3 million units sold by April 2023, while Forbidden West sold over 8.4 million copies within its first year.

According to the review aggregator website Metacritic, both Zero Dawn and Forbidden West have received generally favourable reviews. Both games received nominations for Game of the Year at The Game Awards. The spin-off titles drew a more mixed response; Call of the Mountain received generally favourable reviews, while Lego Horizon Adventures received "mixed or average" reviews.

The games were frequently commended for its distinct, post-apocalyptic setting. The open world design of both games was also praised for evoking a sense of discovery for players. Reviewers praised the scope of Zero Dawn's central mystery and its grounding of complex science fiction concepts in a tribal setting. The overarching plot direction of the sequel drew a more divided response, with its main narrative's sudden shift toward science fiction concerning immortal billionaires being criticized. The second game's storytelling methods, through its use of cutscenes and motion capture, were viewed by critics as an improvement over the first game. Critics have praised Ashly Burch's performance as Aloy, alongside the voice work of the franchise's ensemble cast.

All games in the series had been recognized for their technical achievements. (Note: Cited to multiple reviews) Some critics considered the machine combat to be the franchise's strongest feature. with the overall gameplay loop being compared to that of Monster Hunter. Across the mainline entries, reviewers have identified the simplistic melee combat and encounters with human enemies as the weakest aspects of the gameplay. Critics has noted that both main games were not mechanically innovative, observing their heavy reliance on the gameplay formula established by previous open world games. While the first game's role-playing game mechanics were deemed superfluous, the second game's quests and narrative structure had been compared to other acclaimed western RPGs such as The Witcher 3: Wild Hunt and BioWare games.

=== Thematic and scholarly analysis ===
Academics have examined the series through the lenses of ecofeminism and posthumanism and praised its thematic focus on an environmental ethics of care and the symbiosis between humanity and nature. The series has also been used in educational studies for its potential to counteract gender stereotypes through its variety of complex, non-traditional gender roles. Natalie J. Swain argued that the franchise subscribed to standpoint theory by forcing the player to inhabit the worldview of a social outcast, thereby privileging the perspective of the marginalised.

Andrei Nae and Eirini Bourontzi argued that the core gameplay, which requires the player to hunt and dismantle machines for resources, forces Aloy into the role of a "colonial entrepreneur", which is contradicting to the game's broader ecological message by promoting capitalist exploitation. Nae and Bourontzi further asserted that while the narrative provides a systematic critique of neoliberalism and unregulated corporate governance, the in-game economy paradoxically "naturalises capitalism" by encouraging resource accumulation without lasting environmental consequence. Scholar Ian Faith defended this gameplay mechanic as a "hybrid ecology", where the mechanical harvesting represents a healthy symbiosis and a low-waste approach to survival.
