= Horizon Steel Frontiers =

Upcoming video game

- Developer: NC (Note: Additional work by Guerrilla Games)
- Publisher: NC
- Series: Horizon
- Engine: Unreal Engine 5
- Platforms: Android; iOS; Windows
- Release: 2027
- Genre: MMORPG

Horizon Steel Frontiers is an upcoming massively multiplayer online role-playing game (MMORPG) developed and published by NC, under licence from Sony Interactive Entertainment. It is a spin-off of the Horizon franchise originally created by Guerrilla Games. Unlike previous entries in the franchise, the game is a shared-world multiplayer experience. It is designed primarily as a mobile-first title for Android and iOS devices, alongside a native Windows version playable through NC's proprietary PURPLE launcher. The game was officially announced in November 2025 at the G-Star gaming exhibition in South Korea, and is planned for release in the first half of 2027.

== Gameplay ==
Horizon Steel Frontiers is a massively multiplayer online role-playing game (MMORPG) that transitions the franchise into a cooperative, player versus environment (PvE) multiplayer structure inspired by the Monster Hunter series. Players do not assume the role of the series' traditional protagonist, Aloy, but instead create their own customisable machine hunters and align themselves with one of four returning tribes: the Nora, Tenakth, Utaru, or Oseram.

Combat is designed for touch interfaces and cooperative play. It focuses on melee weapons rather than ranged archery. A new "charged blade" mechanic allows players to deflect attacks and the series' mechanic of targeting and detaching machine components is retained. The developers implemented a "smart lock-in" system to support the mobile control scheme that automatically adjusts distance management during encounters. The game relies on social infrastructure. Players can congregate in hubs to upgrade gear, form guilds, and establish hunting parties before heading out into the open world; NC described these hubs as the "heart of the community" where players connect between missions. The subterranean facilities known as "Cauldrons" return from previous games and serve as traditional MMORPG dungeons designed for team-based exploration. The game introduces new traversal methods, including the ability for players to ride machines, as well as aerial mounts to navigate the world.

== Synopsis ==
The game takes place concurrently with the mainline Horizon entries. The narrative of Steel Frontiers focuses on a new southern territory known as the Deadlands, which feature overgrown skyscrapers and desert environments.

== Development and release ==
Horizon Steel Frontiers is developed by NC. The development started around 2020 or 2021, shortly after NC signed a contract with Horizon developer Guerrilla Games. In 2022, South Korean outlet MTN reported that NC was recruiting for an online Horizon spin-off codenamed "Project Skyline" or "Project H". The game's development by NC is a departure from Sony normally developing their main franchises internally. NC handled programming and live-service infrastructure and built the game in Unreal Engine 5 instead of Guerrilla Games's Decima engine. It is produced by Lee Soonggu.

Guerrilla collaborated on the world design, with studio director Jan-Bart van Beek stating that their involvement was to maintain continuity with the main series. The character designs are more stylised than previous games in the series. At a June 2026 investor presentation it was revealed that the game was planned to be released in the first half of 2027.

Steel Frontiers was announced on 12 November 2025 at G-Star.
