= Lego Horizon Adventures =

2024 video game

- Developers: Guerrilla Games; Studio Gobo
- Publisher: Sony Interactive Entertainment
- Directors: Stéphane Varrault; Xu Xiaojun
- Producer: Alexis Guariguata
- Designers: Floris Kooij; Adam Russell; Alejandro Sanchez; Toño Gonzalez
- Programmer: James Callin
- Artists: Roy Postma; Paul Ayliffe
- Writers: Emil Cholich; Laura Young; Lisa Witmond
- Composer: Homay Schmitz
- Series: Lego; Horizon
- Engine: Unreal Engine 5
- Platforms: Nintendo Switch; PlayStation 5; Windows
- Release: 14 November 2024
- Genre: Action-adventure
- Modes: Single-player, multiplayer

Lego Horizon Adventures is a 2024 action-adventure game co-developed by Guerrilla Games and Studio Gobo in association with The Lego Group, and published by Sony Interactive Entertainment. It is a spin-off in the Horizon franchise and reinterprets the events of Horizon Zero Dawn (2017) in a Lego-themed environment. The game is played from a fixed isometric perspective and allows the player to control one of four protagonists—Aloy, Varl, Erend, or Teersa—as they battle a rogue artificial intelligence known as HADES, and a sun-worshipping cult led by Helis.

The gameplay features a mix of linear platforming and combat that incorporates the franchise's weak-point targeting system. Between missions, the player can customise their central hub village, Mother's Heart, by using studs and bricks to unlock decorations and outfits from various Lego properties. The game supports both local and online two-player co-operative multiplayer. Guerrilla and Studio Gobo designed the game to be a family-friendly adaptation of the original game's dark lore. It was built using Unreal Engine 5. The developers constructed every in-game asset from individual digital Lego bricks and animated the characters in a stop motion style. Several original voice actors from the Horizon series reprised their roles, including Ashly Burch as Aloy. The game was released for Nintendo Switch, PlayStation 5, and Windows on 14 November 2024.

Lego Horizon Adventures received mixed reviews from critics. Reviewers praised the game's visual presentation and vocal performances, but criticised its repetitive level design, simplistic mission structure, and lack of open world exploration. The game received several industry accolades, including a nomination for Outstanding Achievement in Art Direction at the 28th Annual D.I.C.E. Awards and four nominations at the 21st British Academy Games Awards.

== Gameplay ==
A gameplay screenshot demonstrating the game's visual style, where characters and environments are rendered as physical Lego bricks

Lego Horizon Adventures is an action-adventure game played from a fixed isometric perspective. The player takes control of one of four protagonists from the Horizon series: Aloy, who wields her bow; Varl, who uses a spear, Erend, who fights with a hammer, and Teersa, who throws explosive bombs. The mission structures are largely linear. They consist of exploration segments, platforming sections within explorable mechanical ruins, and designated combat arenas where the player fights machines and human cultists. Combat incorporates the weak-point targeting system from previous Horizon games. The player can highlight the components of machines, which allows them to deal more damage by shooting specific parts. The player can recover health during combat by consuming healing items gathered from berry bushes found throughout the arenas. They can also use environmental hazards by picking up and throwing explosive barrels or shooting arrows through fire to deal elemental damage. As the player defeats enemies, they earn experience points to level up the characters. The game features two types of skill trees for progression: a general tree that provides team-wide benefits and character-specific trees that increase maximum health and weapon damage.

Between the linear missions, the player return to a central hub village. The player collects Lego studs and gold bricks by defeating enemies and completing levels, which serve as the primary currency for unlocking customisation options. The village also features a community job board that provides optional objectives for the player to complete during missions in exchange for extra rewards. The player can personalise the village by constructing new buildings and adding various decorations. These customisation options include structures and outfits from other Lego properties, which include Ninjago. The protagonists can also be dressed in an array of unlockable costumes.

The game offers scalable challenges for different skill levels and features multiple difficulty settings. Lego Horizon Adventures supports two-player co-operative multiplayer, which becomes available shortly after the player completes the game's prologue. The co-operative mode works locally or online and uses a shared screen rather than split-screen. It also automatically teleports players together if one falls too far behind.

== Synopsis ==
The story follows Aloy, a young outcast and huntress raised in the wilderness by her mentor, Rost. She wants to find out the identity of her mother and her place in a world populated by animal-like machines. A sun-worshipping cult, led by Helis, interrupts her search when they attack her village. Helis works for a rogue artificial intelligence named HADES. HADES wants to activate ancient war machines to wipe out all life on Earth. During the initial attack, Rost sacrifices his life to save Aloy. The game treats his death lightly and Rost comes back to narrate the rest of the game.

Aloy leaves to stop the cult and recruits allies. They include Varl, a local warrior; Teersa, a village elder; and a fighter named Erend. A man named Sylens also contacts them. Sylens only appears as a hologram, but he has knowledge about the time before the apocalypse. He tells the group they need to recover three ancient metal flowers to stop HADES.

The group eventually finds the flowers and attacks the cult's main base. They defeat Helis and destroy HADES. Aloy then travels into an underground facility to learn about her past, where she discovers that she is a genetic clone of Elisabet Sobeck. Sobeck was a scientist who sacrificed herself to build a system that would restart life on Earth. Aloy views a hologram of Sobeck and gets the closure she wanted. She then goes back to her village to celebrate the victory with her allies.

== Development ==
Lego Horizon Adventures was co-developed by Guerrilla Games and Studio Gobo, in association with The Lego Group. The project originated when The Lego Group approached Guerrilla to pitch a video game collaboration. The two companies had previously established a relationship after partnering to produce a physical Lego set in 2022. The Lego Group was drawn to the Horizon franchise for an adaptation due to its concept of battling robotic dinosaurs and the family-friendly potential of Aloy. Guerrilla publicly announced their co-development partnership with Studio Gobo in January 2023. They sought out Studio Gobo for their background in developing games tailored for children. The developers adapted the serious tone of Zero Dawn into a more playful, co-operative experience, and shifted the focus toward lighthearted humour.

=== Design and animation ===
After working on the franchise for nearly a decade, developers at Guerrilla wanted to create something "whimsical and fun". Guerrilla had a long-standing affinity for Lego and used Duplo blocks to prototype the original machine designs during the development of Horizon Zero Dawn (2017). The game was built using Unreal Engine 5 and features visual enhancements, including updated reflections and virtual shadow maps. Narrative director James Windeler revealed that Guerrilla aimed to create a "playable Lego movie" in terms of graphical fidelity. The team chose to animate the characters using a stop motion style. Every asset and environment was constructed entirely from individual digital Lego bricks, which meant all structure in the game could theoretically be recreated with real physical Lego sets.

=== Writing and casting ===
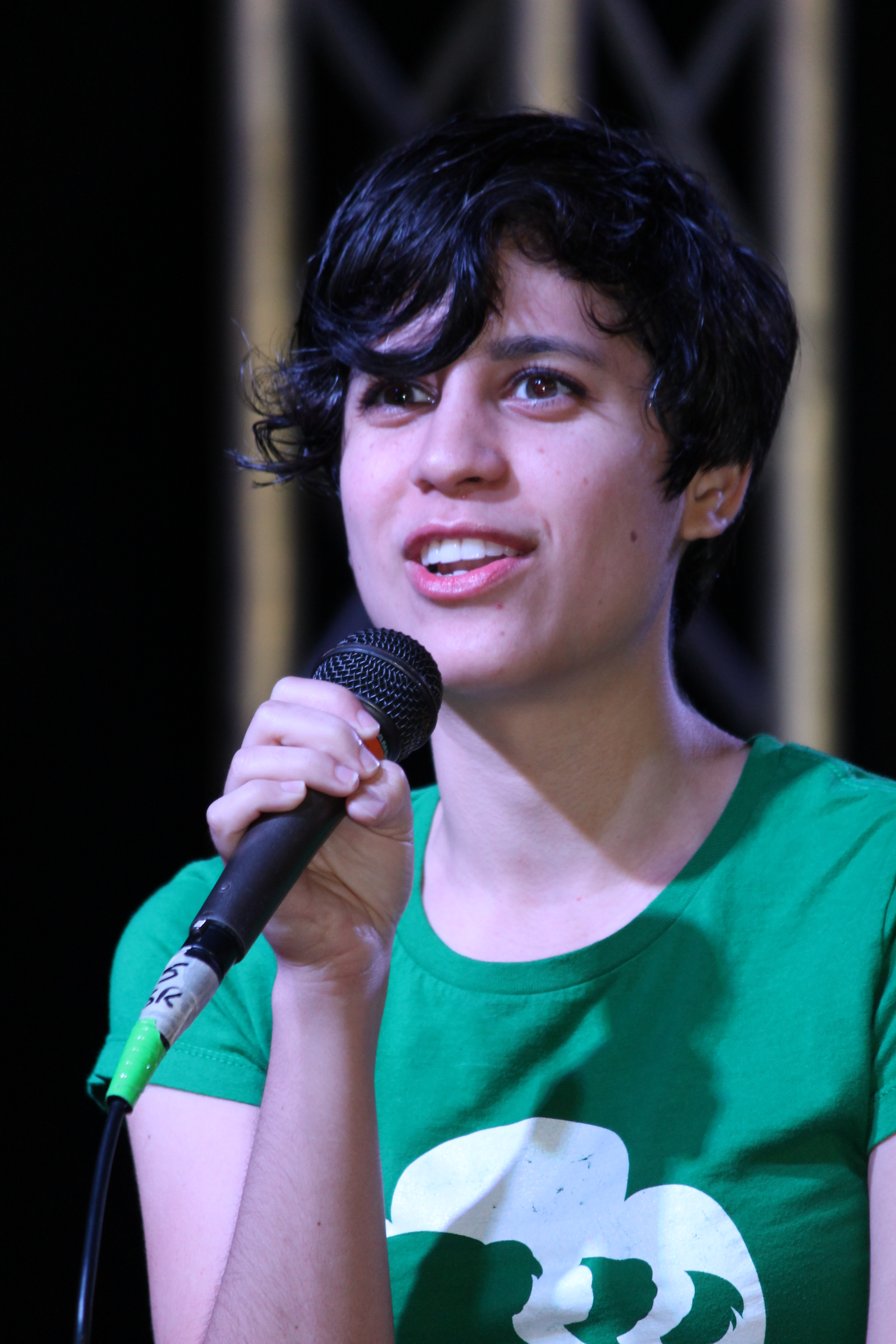
Ashly Burch (pictured in 2014) reprises her role as Aloy.

The writing team adapted Zero Dawn's story into an upbeat, family-friendly narrative. Guerrilla hired contractor Mark Llabres Hill to help establish the game's comedic tone. Hill had previously worked on Sackboy: A Big Adventure (2020) and the Fable franchise. The writers wanted to make the franchise approachable for newcomers by leaning into the slapstick humour characteristic of Lego video games and the self-referential comedy popularised by the Lego films.

Guerrilla brought back several original voice actors from the Horizon series to reprise their roles for the spin-off, including Ashly Burch as Aloy, JB Blanc as Rost, John Macmillan as Varl, and John Hopkins as Erend. Windeler commended the actors for fully embracing the comedic shift and stated that they brought a distinct "exuberance" to their roles. Following the death of original Sylens actor Lance Reddick in March 2023, the character was recast. Tim Russ, who had previously voiced the character Jetakka in Horizon Forbidden West (2022), took over the role of Sylens for the game.

=== Release ===
Lego Horizon Adventures was announced for Nintendo Switch, PlayStation 5, and Windows during the Summer Game Fest showcase in June 2024. Windeler explained that the Switch port aligned with their goal of reaching a broader audience. He added that the Switch's simple control scheme made it a "natural fit" for the project. The game was released on 14 November 2024. While Sony handled the primary publishing duties, the Canadian distributor Solutions 2 GO partnered with the company to distribute the physical retail editions of the game for the Switch. Sony also offered a digital deluxe edition featuring additional cosmetic items. This included exclusive crossover outfits that allowed the player to dress the characters as Ratchet and Rivet from Ratchet & Clank: Rift Apart (2021) and Sackboy from the LittleBigPlanet series. Following the game's launch, The Lego Group released a physical tie-in set featuring characters and machines from the game.

== Reception ==
=== Critical response ===
Reception

Aggregate scores
Aggregator	Score
Metacritic	PS5: 70/100; PC: 66/100; Switch: 64/100
OpenCritic	54% recommend

Review scores
Publication	Score
Digital Trends	3/5
Eurogamer	2/5
GameSpot	7/10
GamesRadar+	4/5
IGN	7/10
Nintendo Life	6/10
NME	3/5
PCMag	3.5/5
Push Square	6/10
TechRadar	3/5
Video Games Chronicle	4/5

Lego Horizon Adventures received "mixed or average" reception according to the review aggregator website Metacritic, while 54% of critics recommended the game according to OpenCritic. The visual presentation was praised as the game's strongest asset. Critics appreciated the environmental design. The cast's vocal performances were well received. Reviewers felt that the light-hearted tone allowed the returning actors to experiment with their characters, with reviewers observing that Ashly Burch's energetic portrayal of Aloy provided a welcome contrast to her more serious performances in the mainline games.

The adaptation of Zero Dawn's narrative garnered a divided response. Several reviewers appreciated the family-friendly approach and felt that the writers successfully adapted the apocalyptic lore of the game into a more accessible adventure. Reviewers also felt that the slapstick comedy suited the usual Lego style. Other critics felt the comedic tone occasionally undermined the core themes of the source material. Sarah Thwaites of TechRadar criticised the game's reliance on cutscenes to deliver pivotal lore moments and argued that the lack of interactivity did a disservice to the source material and made those moments feel less meaningful.

Gameplay mechanics and level design were the primary sources of criticism. Reviewers praised the adaptation of the franchise's weak-point combat system and found that it remained engaging and accessible for younger audiences. The overall mission structure was described as overly linear and repetitive. Critics singled out a lack of the environmental puzzle-solving and character rosters that typically define the Lego video game formula. Jordan Minor and Zackery Cuevas of PCMag argued that the lack of open world exploration felt like a significant missed opportunity for a franchise defined by its environments. Reviewers observed that this repetitive structure, alongside a hub village offering extensive cosmetic customisation but little substantial gameplay, hindered the game's long-term appeal.

=== Accolades ===
Lego Horizon Adventures was nominated for Outstanding Achievement in Art Direction at the 28th Annual D.I.C.E. Awards. The game also received four nominations at the 21st British Academy Games Awards in the Animation, British Game, Family, and Multiplayer categories.
