= Horizon Hunters Gathering =

Upcoming video game

- Developer: Guerrilla Games
- Publisher: Sony Interactive Entertainment
- Director: Arjan Bak
- Series: Horizon
- Engine: Decima
- Platforms: PlayStation 5; Windows
- Genre: Action
- Modes: Single-player, multiplayer

Horizon Hunters Gathering is an upcoming cooperative live service action game developed by Guerrilla Games and published by Sony Interactive Entertainment. It is set in the Horizon universe and is scheduled for release on the PlayStation 5 and Windows. Unlike the mainline entries in the franchise, Hunters Gathering features a stylised, cartoon-inspired art direction and a strong focus on multiplayer team dynamics.

The game was announced in February 2026. Guerrilla launched a closed playtest throughout 2026.

== Gameplay ==
Horizon Hunters Gathering is a tactical, three-player cooperative action game. Players select from a roster of pre-defined Hunters, which includes the Oseram smuggler Ensa and the Carja covert operative Shadow, who fights alongside a Stalker machine. Each Hunter possesses unique weapons, abilities, and melee or ranged playstyles. Character progression incorporates a roguelite perk system, which allowes players to craft builds tailored to their team's needs. The game supports cross-platform play and cross-progression between the PlayStation 5 and Windows. While designed around three-player online co-op, the entire game can be played solo; players use Training Modules for onboarding and are assisted by two artificial intelligence-controlled non-player characters from the main roster of Hunters.

Between missions, players return to the titular "Hunters Gathering", which is a central social hub where they can interact with other players, visit vendors, upgrade their gear, and customise their characters. The game features several primary game modes: Episodes serve as a narrative campaign, and introduce new mechanics and story elements through specific missions. Machine Incursion is a wave-based survival mode where players defend against machines pouring from underground gateways. This mode includes escalating difficulty tiers that allow players to fight multiple bosses simultaneously. Cauldron Descent offers a longer, multi-stage trial set within a Cauldron. The mode features changing rooms and rogue-lite elements.

== Synopsis ==
Hunters Gathering is canon within the Horizon universe and takes place chronologically after the events of Horizon Forbidden West (2022). The game's campaign focuses on a new cast of Hunters with their own personal struggles and motivations. They serve as humanity's defenders against an evolving machine threat. The developers have indicated that the story will introduce new mysteries, characters, and regional threats, and will continue to expand with ongoing updates after the game's launch. Players undertake missions in diverse regions across the world, including the jungles and deserts of Breakers' Bounty, Ashwater Valley, and the returning Devil's Thirst.

== Development ==
Guerrilla announced Hunters Gathering on 5 February 2026, which confirmed rumours of a standalone multiplayer project set in the Horizon universe. The game is directed by Arjan Bak. It uses a stylised art direction instead of the photorealism used in previous titles. Guerrilla launched an initial closed playtest across North America and Europe via the PlayStation Beta Program to refine the multiplayer balance and gather player feedback, which ran from late February to early March. A second playtest took place in late May, which introduced new playable characters and the Breakers' Bounty region, an environment that combines jungles with desert borders.

In August 2026, internal sources contacted by Bloomberg News claimed Sony had reset the development following negative playtest feedback, and a new plan had been set to remove the live service component and turn the game into a cooperative multiplayer game with a story mode.
