= Horizon Call of the Mountain =

2023 video game

- Developers: Guerrilla Games; Firesprite
- Publisher: Sony Interactive Entertainment
- Director: Alex Barnes
- Producer: Angie Smets
- Programmer: Julian Gold
- Artists: Jan-Bart van Beek; Rob Sutton
- Writer: Ben McCaw
- Composers: Alistair Kerley; Frankie Harper
- Series: Horizon
- Engine: Unreal Engine 4
- Platform: PlayStation 5
- Release: 22 February 2023
- Genre: Action-adventure
- Mode: Single-player

Horizon Call of the Mountain is a 2023 action-adventure game co-developed by Guerrilla Games and Firesprite, and published by Sony Interactive Entertainment for the PlayStation 5. It is a spin-off within the Horizon series. The game is played from a first-person perspective. The player controls Ryas, a disgraced former Shadow Carja soldier, as he navigates a world inhabited by hostile, animalistic machines. Gameplay emphasises traversal mechanics, requiring the player to use motion controllers to physically simulate climbing.

The narrative follows Ryas as he seeks a royal pardon by investigating a mysterious signal that is enraging the local machines. He is aided by his brother Urid. Ryas uncovers and thwarts a conspiracy by a rogue engineer intent on weaponising the machines against the Carja capital of Meridian. The game was developed concurrently with Horizon Forbidden West (2022), and built using Unreal Engine 4 to use the PlayStation VR2's headset's eye-tracking and haptic feedback technologies. Call of the Mountain was officially released as a launch title for the PlayStation VR2 virtual reality headset on 22 February 2023.

The game received generally favourable reviews. Critics praised the game's visuals, though some expressed reservations regarding its linear structure and the repetitive nature of its climbing mechanics. The game earned industry recognition and won the Best VR Game at the Golden Joystick Awards and Immersive Reality Technical Achievement at the 27th Annual D.I.C.E. Awards.

== Gameplay ==
In this gameplay screenshot, Ryas is fighting against a Tyrannosaurus rex-like machine.

Horizon Call of the Mountain is an action-adventure game played from a first-person perspective. The player controls Ryas, a former soldier and master climber, who navigates a world populated by hostile, animalistic machines. The game offers multiple movement schemes for different virtual reality comfort levels. The player explores the environment using analogue stick controls or a gesture-based system that requires them to physically swing their arms to simulate walking. Traversal relies on the headset's motion controllers to simulate mountain climbing. The player reaches for and grips handholds, vines, and ropes, while the physics engine simulates tension and weight when grabbing or releasing lines mid-air. As the narrative progresses, the player acquires tools such as twin pickaxes for scaling ice walls and a grappling hook to swing across chasms.

While the overall environmental design is linear, it includes moments of divergence that lead to different encounters. The player can replay these branching paths and return to previous areas from a central hub to find hidden collectibles. The environment includes interactive elements; the player can physically open crates to scavenge resources, play musical instruments, use painting spots, and throw environmental objects off cliffsides. The game confines combat encounters to designated arenas, which transitions the free-roaming movement to a locked track that allows the player to move side-to-side in a circle around the enemy. The player can dodge attacks by physically leaning or executing quick controller inputs. Headset and controller haptic feedback simulate the ground shaking as machines move.

The primary weapon is a bow and arrow, which requires the player to reach over their shoulder physically to draw and nock arrows from a virtual quiver. The headset's eye-tracking technology augments this system by providing a subtle aim assist based on the player's focal point. In addition to the bow, the player unlocks additional weapons, including a slingshot that fires explosives. By striking specific weak points on machines, the player can dislodge destructible armour plates to deal increased damage. The player recovers health by consuming food items scattered throughout the environment. Call of the Mountain also has a "safari mode", an alternative version of the opening cruise that allows the player to observe various machines in their natural habitats.

== Synopsis ==
Ryas is a disgraced former Shadow Carja rebel, who is released from prison by the Carja spymaster Marad. Marad explains that the machines surrounding a local settlement have become aggressive. Ryas's older brother, Urid, recently disappeared while investigating the cause of the attacks. Marad offers Ryas a full pardon in exchange for locating Urid and uncovering the source of the machines' aggression. Ryas reluctantly agrees and is briefly guided by the huntress Aloy before she departs on her own journey.

Ryas scales the local peaks and repairs an ancient elevator to reach the summit, where he discovers a trail left by Urid. He follows the clues to an ancient ruin and is forced to battle a large machine. After defeating it, Ryas shuts down a transmitter that was broadcasting a signal to enrage and lure the local machines. He finds further evidence that Urid has continued his pursuit into a neighbouring territory. After reporting his success to Marad, Ryas receives his pardon and chooses to continue the search for his brother. He tracks Urid down and discovers he is hunting Asera, a rogue engineer who developed the lures to weaponise the machines against the Carja. Urid refuses assistance and sabotages Ryas's transport to continue the hunt alone. Ryas is forced to find an alternate route, but both brothers are captured by Asera. They work together to escape, though Urid is severely wounded in the process.

Ryas discovers Asera's overarching plot: she intends to load machines with the lures and send them towards the Carja capital of Meridian, which would draw an army of hostile machines directly into the city. Ryas intercepts the convoy and thwarts the attack. During the final confrontation, Asera is left dangling from a cliffside; refusing to accept help from a Carja, she then drops to her apparent death. (Note: Asera appears in Horizon Forbidden West (2022), where it is revealed that she survived the fall.) With the threat neutralised, Ryas earns his brother's respect. Marad decides to keep the conspiracy hidden and grants Ryas a new identity, which allows him to travel freely, though he warns that he may call upon Ryas's services again in the future.

== Development and release ==
Horizon Call of the Mountain was co-developed by Guerrilla Games and Firesprite. The two studios began collaborating on the game alongside the development of Horizon Forbidden West (2022). Unlike the mainline entries in the franchise, which run on Guerrilla's proprietary Decima engine, Call of the Mountain was developed using Epic Games' Unreal Engine 4. The developers maintained performance by using the PSVR 2's headset's eye-tracking in conjunction with foveated rendering, which focused the console's processing power to render higher resolutions where the player was looking. Developers included accessibility features, such as disabling falling and automated arrow loading, to accommodate varying skill levels. Some team members experienced motion sickness with traditional analogue stick movement, so the developers conceptualised the gesture-based "arm-swinger" traversal scheme as a more comfortable alternative.

Guerrilla's studio animation director Richard Oud explained that the team had to remodel and reanimate the machines to accommodate the new first-person virtual reality perspective. The new viewpoint altered the player's perception of scale, which meant that the machine attacks and behaviours had to be redesigned so that they remained readable and fair during close combat. Narrative director Ben McCaw stated that the shift to VR also impacted storytelling. The team created Ryas to emphasise the scale of the machines from a lower vantage point.

The player uses physical gestures with the motion controllers to cast and retract the grappling hook and the game introduces traversal tools gradually to prevent players from being overwhelmed. The team used eye-tracking to allow non-player characters to maintain eye contact with the player. Studio director Jan-Bart van Beek added that the system was tuned to have characters eventually shift their gaze so interactions remained natural rather than "creepy". Haptic feedback in the controllers and headset is used for environmental interactions and to convey the weight of the machines. Alistair Kerley and Frankie Harper composed the game's original score, and adapted the franchise's established musical themes for Ryas.

The game was officially announced during Sony's Consumer Electronics Show press conference in January 2022. A gameplay trailer demonstrating climbing and combat debuted during a PlayStation State of Play broadcast in June 2022. On 6 February 2023, Guerrilla Games confirmed that the game had "gone gold", which meant that development had concluded and the game was ready for manufacturing. Horizon Call of the Mountain was released as a launch title for the PlayStation VR2 virtual reality headset on 22 February 2023. In addition to its standalone release, the game was also made available as an official hardware bundle paired directly with the headset.

== Reception ==
=== Critical response ===
Reception

Aggregate scores
Aggregator	Score
Metacritic	79/100
OpenCritic	78% recommend

Review scores
Publication	Score
Game Informer	6.75/10
GameSpot	7/10
GamesRadar+	4.5/5
IGN	7/10
Push Square	7/10
The Telegraph	5/5
Video Games Chronicle	4/5
VG247	3/5

Horizon Call of the Mountain received "generally favourable" reception according to the review aggregator website Metacritic, while 78% of critics recommended the game according to OpenCritic. Reviewers generally viewed the game as a strong demonstration of the PlayStation VR2 hardware. However, opinions varied regarding its depth as a standalone game; some critics characterised the experience as too heavily constrained by its linearity, arguing it felt more reminiscent of a technical demonstration rather than a fully fleshed-out entry in the franchise.

The game's visual presentation and environmental design were commended. Sam Loveridge of GamesRadar+ and Dan Silver of The Telegraph praised the environmental detail as a strong use of the new hardware. Reviewers found that the transition to a first-person perspective effectively conveyed the scale of the franchise's machines. IGN's Simon Cardy singled out the game's environmental detail and scale, though some reviewers viewed it primarily as an introductory experience for the headset.

Reactions to the Ryas were mixed; Tamoor Hussain of GameSpot praised him as an engaging player stand-in and a capable guide for exploring the world, whereas Ian Higton of Eurogamer criticised his internal monologue as uninteresting. Cardy described the overall story as serviceable and that Ryas's dialogue was limited enough to let the player experience the world without distraction. Reviewers praised accessibility features including customisable movement schemes, vignetting, and the option to disable falling for mitigating motion sickness.

Reactions to the core climbing mechanics were mixed, often dependent on individual player comfort and expectations. Some reviewers described the traversal as intuitive and physically engaging; Henry Stockdale of UploadVR praised the real-time physics for providing an accurate sense of bouncy tension during rope interactions. Some writers criticised the reliance on these mechanics for negatively impacting pacing. Kyle Hilliard of Game Informer felt the game relied too heavily on climbing and argued that scaling mountains was the weakest part of the game, while VG247's Tom Orry wrote that it dominated the runtime, though he felt the views compensated for the repetition. The combat sequences drew similarly varied responses. Hussain cited the execution of the bow mechanics and the strategic element of selecting the appropriate arrows for different enemies. The decision to restrict fights to locked circular tracks and isolated arenas was criticised by Sammy Barker of Push Square who wrote that this approach made the combat feel limited and restrictive compared to the freedom offered by the main series.

=== Sales ===
Horizon Call of the Mountain sold 6,027 physical units during its first week of release in Japan, making it the 16th best-selling retail game in the country. It was the fifth most downloaded PlayStation VR2 game in Europe in 2024.

=== Accolades ===
Horizon Call of the Mountain received multiple awards and nominations for its virtual reality design and technical achievements. In 2023, the game won Best VR Game at the Golden Joystick Awards, and received a nomination for Best VR/AR Game at The Game Awards 2023. The following year, it won Immersive Reality Technical Achievement at the 27th Annual D.I.C.E. Awards, where it was also nominated for Immersive Reality Game of the Year. The game received nominations for the Coney Island Dreamland Award for Best AR/VR Game at the New York Game Awards and for Technical Achievement at the 20th British Academy Games Awards.
