= Rhino Rumble =

2002 video game

- Developer: Lost Boys Games
- Publisher: Telegames
- Series: Rhino Rumble
- Platform: Game Boy Color
- Release: March 28, 2002
- Genre: Platform
- Mode: Single-player

Rhino Rumble is a 2002 game for the Game Boy Color developed by Lost Boys Games and published by Telegames. The game is a side-scrolling platformer set in the jungle.

== Gameplay ==
Gameplay screenshot

Rhino Rumble is a platform game in which the player guides Rocky, a rhino who finds himself with a burning breath after eating a hot pepper, to find a magical waterfall that will return his breath to normal. The game features nineteen levels across seven worlds, spanning "forests, caves, scorching deserts and freezing snowfields". The player character defeats enemies by using his breath to shoot fireballs and "belly bouncing" on them. Defeating enemies awards the player with points to unlock bonus levels later in the game. Boats, planes and mine carts are also available to help the player traverse through the levels.

== Reception ==
Reception

Review scores
Publication	Score
AllGame	2.5/5
Game Boy Power	8/10
Game Boy Xtreme	81%
Total Advance	77%

Rhino Rumble received mild reviews. Marc Nix of IGN stated that the game was "charming fun", with "bright" and "colourful" graphics. Total Advance praised the visual presentation of the game, noting the "backgrounds are nicely rendered" across the diverse worlds, observing that the game is easy to pick up and get into. Negative reviews critiqued the unremarkable qualities of Rhino Rumble compared to other platform games. Brett Allan Weiss of AllGame dismissed the game as a "derivative platformer", noting its lack of power-ups, secret rooms, and puzzles, stating whilst Rhino Rumble was "not a bad game", it was "a watered down, simplified" composite of several other games in the genre. Whilst praising the game, Game Boy Power similarly conceded the game was "unoriginal".

== Legacy ==
An unreleased puzzle-platform game, Rhino Rumble Puzzle, was planned for release in 2001 or 2002. IGN previewed the game in 2000, stating Rhino Rumble Puzzle featured 60 levels with minigames, and would allow players to create and share their own stages using the Game Boy Color infrared link. Lost Boys Games developer Mathijs de Jonge revealed that the studio was unable to find a publisher because publishers wanted licensed characters, and they asked the studio to change their own characters to well-known cartoon figures. The studio refused, which led to the game's cancellation.
