= RIGS: Mechanized Combat League =

2016 video game

- North American box art
- Developer: Guerrilla Cambridge
- Publisher: Sony Interactive Entertainment
- Directors: Piers Jackson; Steven ter Heide
- Artist: Tom Jones
- Composers: Andrew Barnabas; Paul Arnold
- Engine: Decima
- Platform: PlayStation 4
- Release: WW: 13 October 2016
- Genres: First-person shooter, sports
- Modes: Single-player, multiplayer

RIGS: Mechanized Combat League is a 2016 first-person shooter sports video game developed by Guerrilla Cambridge and published by Sony Interactive Entertainment for the PlayStation 4. It was released for the PlayStation VR. The online servers for the game were shut down on 12 August 2022.

== Gameplay ==
Players take control of large mechs known as "Rigs" as they compete in a professional sports competition set 50 years in the future. The sports competition takes place in an open arena based in real-world locations, such as Rio de Janeiro and Dubai.

The overall gameplay consists of a five-minute match divided into two halves. Six players are grouped in two three-man teams. Rigs are equipped with a variety of weapons loadouts, which players can use to score a Takedown by destroying an opposing team's Rig. There are three playable match types in the game:

- Team Takedown: A match type similar to team deathmatch, where two teams race against each other to score the most takedowns within five minutes.
- Power Slam: Two teams compete against each other to score the most points by jumping into a ring in the middle of the arena. Before doing so, players must first enter the Overdrive mode by scoring takedowns and collecting power spheres.
- Endzone: In the same vein as American football, two teams attempt to take control of a holographic ball and score by running through the opposition's goalpost while in possession of the ball.

There are four Rig classes in the game, each with unique characteristics: Sentinel, Hunter, Mirage, and Tempest. There are a total of 24 Rigs available to players. Each individual Rig also comes with its own weapons loadout and ability, e.g. Nine Lives is a Mirage-class Rig with the Vampire ability which restores the Rig to full health upon taking down an opponent, and a weapons loadout consisting of warhead missile launcher on the left arm and beam laser emitter on the right arm, while Dead Center is a Tempest-class Rig with the Thief ability which allows the Rig to pick up power spheres and the Endzone ball by shooting them from a distance and keeps the Rig invisible to the radar while in Turbo Mode, and a weapons loadout consisting of heavy machine gun on both arms.

The game features a single-player campaign and online multiplayer mode. The single-player campaign revolves around a three-division league, complete with single-elimination tournament matches occurring between regular season matches, and a number of AI pilots which the player can hire as teammates. The online multiplayer mode includes exhibition mode where the player can challenge another player in a one-on-one match assisted by AI pilots or set up custom matches to play with friends, and "Divisions" campaign mode where players compete in online matches to move up through ten divisions.

The game also features sponsorship representing fictional companies. There are a number of sponsorship tasks that can be completed on single-player or online matches, and reward a customization item for first-time completion, in addition to cash or follower boost. These tasks range from taking down each opponent once without ejecting to scoring a specified number of takedowns in a single match using a particular Rig class.

== Reception ==
Reception

Aggregate score
Aggregator	Score
Metacritic	78/100

Review scores
Publication	Score
Destructoid	8.5/10
Edge	8/10
Electronic Gaming Monthly	8/10
Game Informer	7.25/10
GameSpot	6/10
IGN	6.5/10
PlayStation Official Magazine – UK	9/10

RIGS: Mechanized Combat League was released to mostly positive reviews. Metacritic calculated an average score of 78 out of 100 based on 44 reviews. The Official UK PlayStation Magazine listed it as the sixth best PS VR game.

GameSpot praised the controls and comfort options available to player, alongside the headset tracking, "And the ability to use your head to move around and aim, while disconcerting at first, is what makes the entire VR experience come together". While enjoying the game modes, IGN criticized the long matchmaking and load times "This can lead to a lot of downtime with nothing to do and a VR headset strapped to your face". Game Informer's reviewer felt nausea after longer play-sessions, but liked the variety present in the class system, "Each rig feels distinct and I enjoyed trying out each chassis and class". Destructoid wrote that the game seemed designed completely around the headset, "The seated cockpit style with a sleek 3D overlay works so well, as does the “look with your head” aim-to-turn system".
