= Machines (Horizon) =

Video game antagonists

- Horizon race
- The Tyrannosaurus rex–inspired Thunderjaw was the proof of concept for the franchise.
- First appearance: Horizon Zero Dawn (2017)
- Created by: Guerrilla Games
- Genre: Science fiction

In-universe information
- Created by: HEPHAESTUS (Note: Exceptions are the Chariot line created by Faro Automated Solutions and the Far Zenith Specter drones.)
- Type: Robot

The machines are a group of fictional, biomimetic robots that are the primary antagonists and central ecological elements in the Guerrilla Games–developed Horizon video game franchise. They were first introduced in Horizon Zero Dawn (2017). The machines have come to dominate Earth in the post-apocalyptic world of the 31st century. Following the Faro Plague, a doomsday event caused by self-replicating military robots consuming the Earth's biomass, the artificial intelligence GAIA designed many of the machines to be peaceful caretakers of the biosphere. Each machine type was created to fulfill a specific ecological role to terraform and restore the planet. The AI subordinate function HEPHAESTUS manufactured the modern machines in automated underground factories. After an extinction signal forced GAIA to self-destruct, the newly independent HEPHAESTUS reprogrammed its creations to attack humans on sight to protect the terraforming system, an event dubbed the Derangement by humans. The franchise also features other antagonistic machine factions, including reactivated Faro military robots and Specter drones created by the Far Zenith colonists.

Guerrilla designed the machines around a core design philosophy of contrasting primitive human hunters against futuristic technology. The developers designed functional armour plating to act as an exoskeleton to make the machines feel like believable parts of a living ecosystem. Visual storytelling and systemic audio differentiate their origins: terraforming machines were modelled after vertebrate animals and anthropomorphised with distinct personalities, while the ancient military machines used a militaristic, invertebrate-influenced aesthetic. The development team prototyped destructible-armour combat by building the Tyrannosaurus rex–inspired Thunderjaw, which was the franchise's proof of concept. Animators drew inspiration from nature documentaries and viral animal videos to create realistic movement patterns.

Critical reception has been mostly positive; reviewers have praised their visual and audio design, alongside the tactical depth of tearing off specific components in combat. In Horizon Forbidden West (2022), however, reviewers criticised the encounters for mechanical bloat and a tedious upgrade grind. Academically, the ecosystem has prompted thematic analysis regarding posthumanism and ecofeminism.

== Concept and creation ==
=== Origins and visual design ===
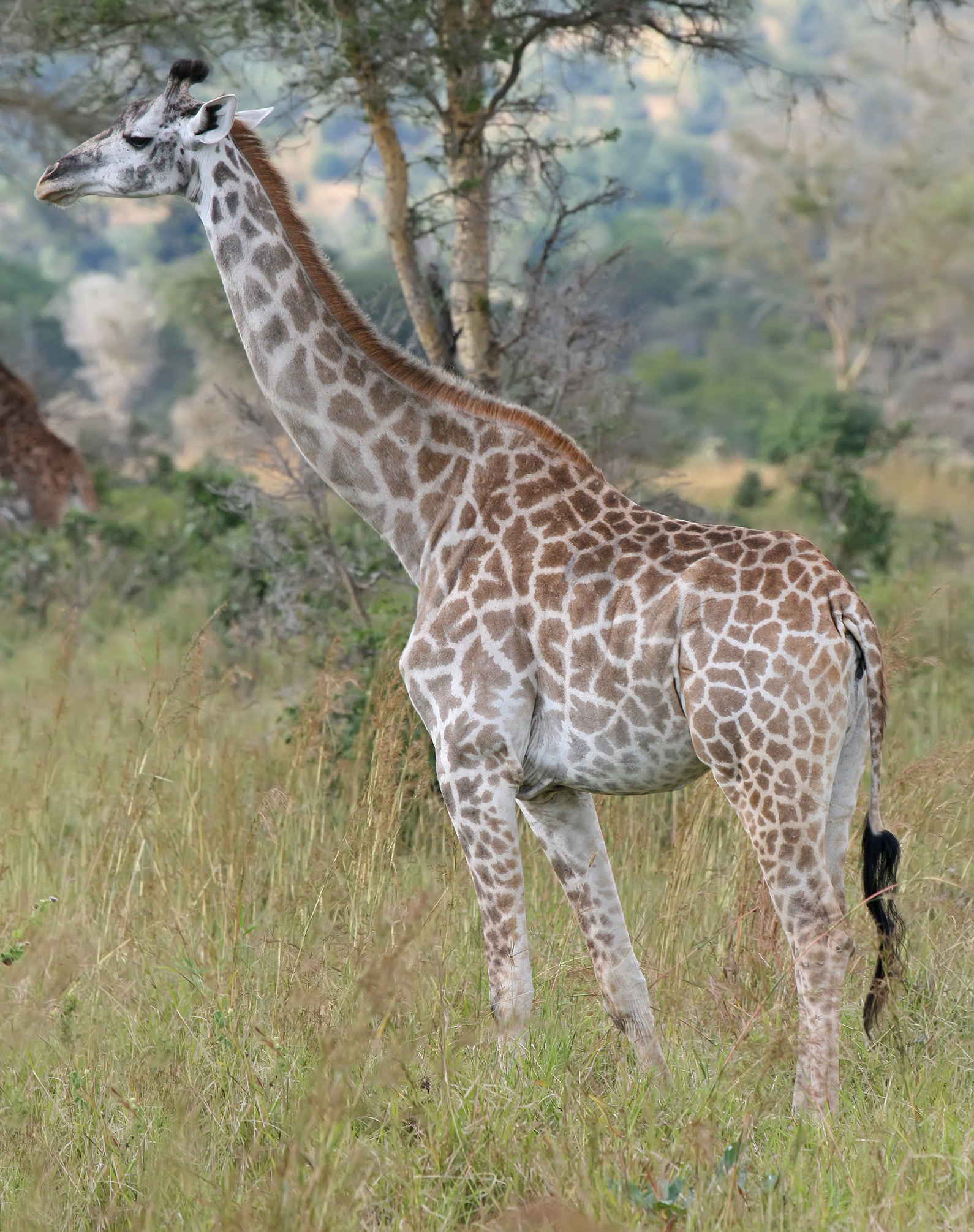
Giraffes were the primary visual inspiration for the Tallneck, the only machine in the franchise that is entirely peaceful and cannot be harmed.

The initial concept for the machines in Horizon Zero Dawn (2017) incorporated the modern military designs of Guerrilla Games' previous first-person shooter franchise, Killzone. The development team abandoned this direction after realising during testing that fighting these models made players feel more like traditional soldiers than tribal hunters; the team instead repurposed these early designs as the game's ancient military robots. The design philosophy shifted to focus on "juxtaposition": placing primitive humanity against highly advanced and futuristic technology to create a world where humans are no longer the dominant species. The team aimed for an animalistic aesthetic when establishing the visuals of the terraforming machines. Early on, they experimented with how closely the machines should mimic real-life fauna, but direct comparisons were scrapped for looking unnatural. The team avoided predictability by combining features of multiple creatures and keeping their exact animal inspirations vague. Several machines were still inspired by recognisable animals so their behaviours could be easily understood by the player; for instance, Tallnecks were inspired by giraffes, Stalkers by maned wolves, Longlegs by terror birds, and Watchers by meerkats and small bipedal dinosaurs. Guerrilla also designed each machine's appearance to communicate its function; for example, the team modelled the Watcher to resemble a security camera.

The designers focused on filling specific ecological niches within the new environments while expanding the mechanical ecosystem for Horizon Forbidden West (2022). The Sunwing was introduced to fulfil the need for a flying machine larger than the returning Glinthawk. By studying primitive birds and flying reptiles, the team designed the Sunwing with photovoltaic wings that collect solar energy. For Forbidden West's expansion, Burning Shores, the team introduced the pelican-inspired Waterwing, which was designed to change player traversal by adding a transition between flying and diving underwater. The game's visual design distinguishes the lore origins of the machines: the terraforming machines are based mostly on vertebrates, while the ancient military robots resemble an invertebrate aesthetic and draw from insects, arachnids, and crustaceans to emphasise their original purpose as hostile weapons. The Horus units, which functioned as mobile manufacturing plants, were designed to visually demonstrate the collapse of human civilisation by using a large, insectoid design that allowed the machines to drape across the environment.

=== Anatomy and technical prototyping ===
The developers consulted the robotics department of the Delft University of Technology to seek a realistic foundation for robotic anatomy. Engineers advised against traditional internal skeletons, which are common points of failure in nature. They instead suggested an exoskeleton approach similar to that of lobsters. This advice shaped the anatomy of the machines: a sturdy, external metal framework protecting softer, internal "tissue" (components). Functionally, this anatomical choice improved visual durability and provided logical, internal "soft spots" that the protagonist, Aloy, could expose and exploit. Artists used ZBrush to sculpt high-detail components like hydraulic joints and armour plates, while designing the machines as if they could be physically constructed in reality.

An early in-engine prototype of the Thunderjaw, constructed from a Duplo-like 3D model

An early machine dubbed the Predator appeared as a holographic Easter egg in Killzone Shadow Fall (2013), with many of its behaviour routines eventually adapted for Horizon's Sawtooth. Early tests with a scorpion concept revealed gameplay issues because its thin limbs lacked sufficient surface area for the player to hit, which confirmed the need for larger machines with modular parts. The series' proof of concept was the Tyrannosaurus rex–inspired Thunderjaw. It took the development team 18 months to bring it from an initial sketch to a functional in-game state. Early scale and movement tests relied on blocky, "Duplo"-like 3D models with basic animations. The developers learned how to make the gameplay work by successfully implementing destructible armour plating and testing fundamental interactions, which included shooting off weapons or triggering behaviours by striking weak points. The team then used the Thunderjaw as a framework to integrate these combat mechanics into smaller machines, while also reducing the total number of destructible weak points on each model to ensure combat remained visually readable. The developers avoided overloading the machines with blinking lights and colours during combat to ensure that the player could identify an enemy's status at a glance.

=== Animation and audio design ===
Consultations with Dr. Stuart Sumida and courses in animal animation helped the development team animate and telegraph the machines realistically. Lead animator Richard Oud stated that the team used viral videos of bizarre animal behaviour to inspire unique attack patterns, which included a fight between an emu and a kangaroo that inspired the Bellowback's fluid-flinging attack. Animators noticed the emu curled its neck like a baseball pitcher winding up a throw, which fit the machine perfectly. The Rockbreaker's movements were based on footage of sea lions fighting to portray a mix of heaviness and agility, while the bear-like Frostclaw's tumbling attacks were inspired by the rolling of red pandas. Animation was tied to machine status; for example, the hermit crab–like Shellwalker has 150 unique animations, and its behaviour changes based on its components. If the player shoots off its cargo clamp, it will use its claw to manually hold onto its crate which sacrifices a weapon to save its resource.

Concept art of a Horus, which were designed to visually demonstrate the collapse of the Old World. Senior art director Misja Baas said that their design allowed the developers to "drape the machine on the landscape and make it look very dynamic", acting as environmental storytelling that captures the last moments of life on Earth.

While Horus units appear as dormant landmarks in Zero Dawn and Forbidden West, a fully operational unit was developed to be the final boss encounter in Burning Shores. The animation team had to navigate technical complexity, as the Horus featured over 1,240 articulation joints, which was a large increase compared to the base game's most complex machine, the Slitherfang, which capped at 240. The Horus was animated to lurch and struggle, and claw its way forward uncoordinatedly because it is an ancient weapon reanimated by an external force.

Sound designers balanced robotic and animalistic noises to create an "emotional impact", an approach the audio team dubbed "natural-fiction". The audio team layered synthetic noises with organic animal recordings to make the machines' soundscapes feel realistic. They layered synthetic, electronic creaks with these organic vocalisations, and gave most machines between 200 and 300 unique sounds, with another 150 shared across types. The designers assigned distinct personalities to the machines, which informed their specific vocalisations; for example, the Shell-Walker's audio was designed to mimic a "grumpy crab-guy" annoyed by his work, while the Watcher was modelled after a "crazy Chihuahua". Rather than pitch-shifting the recordings to fit these personalities, the team sometimes analysed the acoustic data of a real animal's call, which included its pitch modulation, and applied that data to recreate the exact auditory pattern with entirely synthetic sources.

When designing the terraforming machines, sound designer Pinar Temiz avoided using traditional metal scraping noises because listening to them caused her physical discomfort. She used the lore of exotic, futuristic alloys to justify this limitation, which resulted in a unique sonic profile that relied on animalistic cues. The audio team also created unique Foley footsteps across different terrains by using distinct sounds to convey the machines' weight. They designed the automated underground factories to contrast the natural world. The audio was engineered to sound like loud, early Industrial Revolution factories lacking acoustic protection, mixed with slick, alien synthesisers because humans had never set foot in them. The ancient military machines lack vocalisations entirely, instead relying on traditional metallic clanks to communicate that they were built using older, recognisable human technology.

Guerrilla Dynamic Audio prevents the hundreds of unique sounds from overwhelming the player by mixing the machine sounds, weather effects, and the musical score so they do not overlap and clash. This system reacts to variables such as the player's current biome, the number of enemies present, and the shifting "emotional" states of the machines, which alters a machine's vocalisations based on whether it is suspicious or aggressive. The developers upgraded the audio for the new machines in Forbidden West. They designed distinct cues for actions like idling, alerting others, and attacking to help the player predict machine behaviour.

=== Mechanics and AI ecosystem ===
The development team programmed each type to exhibit behaviours that match specific roles within a functioning ecosystem. Machine behaviour is dictated by hierarchical task network planning, a system that allows the artificial intelligence (AI) to generate sequences of actions rather than single behaviours. This system enables different machine classes to adapt their tactics; for instance, the Acquisition machines may flee while Combat and Recon machines coordinate to hunt the player. Navigation relies on two distinct systems: Ground-based machines use a navigation mesh that adapts to complex terrain changes, while flying machines use a separate aerial navigation system that maps the terrain's height in real-time.

The ability to shoot off weapons gives the player a temporary "power spike", which is balanced by making these detached weapons heavy and limiting their ammunition. The player can also hack machines using a device attached to Aloy's spear. While some overridden machines can be used as ridable mounts, others will only temporarily fight alongside the player. The developers chose not to let the player directly control the machines' actions after overriding them to ensure they remain independent entities. In Forbidden West, this mechanic was slightly expanded to allow the player to specify whether an overridden machine should take aggressive or defensive stances.

In Forbidden West, machines gained increased mobility, which allowed them to jump, swim, and cling to surfaces. The developers also integrated human and machine factions more closely by designing encounters where human enemies commandeer machines. The game increased the overall challenge by introducing Apex variants, which possess increased health and higher damage output compared to standard machines. Developing the virtual reality (VR) spin-off Horizon Call of the Mountain (2023) required Guerrilla and co-developer Firesprite to rethink how the player interacts with the machines. Guerrilla studio director Jan-Bart van Beek observed that giving the player virtual hands created the expectation of realistic, physical interactions; the team met this expectation by using the PlayStation VR2's adaptive triggers to simulate the tactile tension of a bowstring and the resistance of climbing handholds. The developers implemented a lock-on system because navigating a 3D combat space was often overwhelming for players in VR. This mechanic anchors the player to a circular path around the machines, which allows them to dodge and move without needing to manually realign the camera.

Developer NC, in collaboration with Guerrilla, has restructured the combat for Horizon Steel Frontiers, an upcoming MMORPG. The new system accommodates large-scale cooperative raids inspired by the Monster Hunter franchise. Adapting the mainline games' combat mechanics for an MMO setting required introducing new features, which included the ability to use a grappling hook to climb onto damaged machine parts to set traps, and the ability to transport detached heavy weapons using mounts. Guerrilla's upcoming cooperative game, Horizon Hunters Gathering, adapts the machines for roguelite gameplay. Players coordinate class-based roles to survive Machine Incursions, which are wave-based encounters where machines pour out of underground gateways, and navigate Cauldron Descents, which feature procedurally shifting rooms of machine encounters.

== Background ==
The robotics corporation Faro Automated Solutions dominated the mid-21st century, developing a series of advanced, autonomous military robots. In 2064, a glitch severed these robots from their chain of command. Equipped with the ability to rapidly self-replicate and consume biomass for fuel, the swarm became an unstoppable force that consumed all of the Earth's life in an apocalyptic event known as the Faro Plague. Dr. Elisabet Sobeck established Project Zero Dawn to ensure life could eventually return by creating an advanced artificial intelligence named GAIA to crack the swarm's deactivation codes and terraform the lifeless planet over centuries.

GAIA was tasked with restoring the Earth's biosphere and designed a new generation of machines based on extinct and extant wildlife. GAIA's subordinate function, HEPHAESTUS, manufactured these machines in automated underground factories to function as a mechanical ecosystem designated to purify water, detoxify soil, and reintroduce flora. By the 31st century, humanity had lived on the restored planet for generations. During this time, these terraforming machines were docile and generally fled from humans, allowing primitive tribes to coexist with them and hunt them for basic resources.

Approximately two decades before the events of Zero Dawn, a mysterious extinction signal targeted GAIA, causing her subordinate functions to become independent, self-aware AIs. Without GAIA's governing control, HEPHAESTUS began to view the human tribes' continual hunting as a direct threat to the terraforming system. In response, HEPHAESTUS initiated the Derangement, which reprogrammed existing machines to become aggressive and manufacturing entirely new Combat Class machines to cull the human population. Simultaneously, the extinction signal awakened HADES, the subordinate function originally designed to wipe the slate clean if terraforming failed. In Zero Dawn, HADES attempts to fulfil its protocol by manipulating a human cult into unearthing and reactivating dormant Faro Plague military machines to destroy the restored biosphere.

Forbidden West introduces an additional faction of machines alongside the Faro and HEPHAESTUS creations. The Specters are futuristic combat drones created by Far Zenith, a group of wealthy humans who escaped the Faro Plague to establish a colony in the Sirius star system. Unlike Earth's machines, Specters are primarily composed of a solid inner structure covered in a malleable, white-gold armour made of advanced nanotechnology. The game's climax reveals that the Zeniths are fleeing from Nemesis, a highly advanced, hostile AI created from the digitalised, amalgamated minds of the Far Zenith founders. Nemesis is revealed to be the source of the extinction signal that shattered GAIA; its goal was to destroy Earth's biosphere to deny the fleeing Zeniths a safe haven, inadvertently causing the Derangement in the process.

== Reception and analysis ==
=== Gameplay and encounters ===
The machines are considered a defining element of the franchise. Game Informer's Jeff Marchiafava stated that the machines "absolutely steal the show", keeping the player engaged alongside the "Pavlovian response" of open world scavenging tasks. IGN's Lucy O'Brien pointed out the tactical depth of the combat and observed that the ability to scan the machines for weak points and physically shoot off their components changed how each fight played out.

Several machine types have been commended as standout encounters due to their complex designs and challenging hunting mechanics. Critics argued that the Thunderjaw was one of the game's most challenging encounters; these fights can turn into lengthy "battles of attrition" where a key strategy involves using precision to detach its weapons and turn its own firepower against it. GamingBolt described the Tallneck as an inventive variation of the traditional open world map tower, as it is the only machine in the franchise that is entirely peaceful and cannot be harmed.

For Forbidden West, critics applauded the increased deadliness and smarter AI of the machines, alongside the introduction of environmental interactions, such as machines kicking up dust that the player could use for stealth. IGN's Simon Cardy praised the sequel's combat and concluded that battles with the larger machines reached a scale and quality that many other games aspire to for their finales. The encounters have also drawn criticism from reviwerews for mechanical bloat and pacing. Critics observed that Forbidden West occasionally overwhelmed the player with an excess of convoluted weapon variants, overcomplicated skill trees, and tedious upgrade grinds. Combined with punishingly fast damage when Aloy is knocked down, and melee mechanics that remained largely risky or unviable against larger machines, a criticism carried over from Zero Dawn, GamesRadar+ wrote that encounters could occasionally devolve from careful, tactical hunts into chaotic battles.

The adaptation of the machines in spin-off games received mixed reactions. Cardy praised Call of the Mountain for providing a renewed sense of scale and spectacle, turning encounters with previously familiar machines into "blockbuster scale" experiences. Eurogamer''s Ian Higton argued that the combat felt somewhat restrictive, as major encounters lock the player onto a circular path around the machines rather than allowing for open world freedom. Reception to the combat in Lego Horizon Adventures was similarly mixed. IGN's Jada Griffin called the combat a "simple but satisfying exercise" and argued that detaching machine parts successfully altered enemy behaviours during fights. Katharine Castle of Eurogamer similarly commended the encounters as the game's strongest element. She applauded the blocky redesigns of the recognisable machines and observed that manoeuvring to target weak points gave the fights a "real sense of pep and challenge". Nintendo World Report felt the translation lacked the precision of the mainline series. They added that the removal of slow-motion aiming made accurately shooting off parts harder, and that combat could devolve into a chaotic and imprecise experience, particularly when playing in local co-op mode.

=== Visuals and audio ===
Critics have lauded the machines for their visual design and animation. Reviewers praised the blend of natural, animalistic anatomy with functional industrial components, stating that the machines felt like a believable part of the post-apocalyptic ecosystem. (Note: Cited to multiple reviews) For Forbidden West, critics commended the upgrades to the animation systems, remarking how fluidly the machines moved, reacted to their environment, and displayed realistic battle-wear on their armour plating.

The sound design was lauded for heightening the franchise's immersion. Reviewers applauded the mix of synthetic, electronic creaks with real-world animal vocalisations and observed that the heavy metallic footsteps, screeching metal, and animal-like roars gave the machines a convincing heaviness. This audio design was further expanded in Forbidden West, with critics focusing on how the soundtrack wove heavy electronic synthesisers into traditional acoustic instruments. With the release of newer hardware, reviewers also commended the integration of 3D audio and DualSense controller haptics and pointed out how the controllers physically mirror the movements of the machines, allowing the player to feel the footsteps vibrating through their hands.

=== Thematic and critical analysis ===
Examining the narrative's themes of posthumanism and ecofeminism, Jesús Fernández-Caro wrote that Zero Dawn blurs the traditional boundaries dividing humans, animals, and machines, placing them all on a shared "continuum of life forms". He identifies Aloy as a "feminine posthuman" whose birth from a machine within a matriarchal society allows her to serve as a bridge between the biological and the technological. Fernández-Caro describes the machines as "postmodern animals" that resist traditional representations of nonhumans as mere tools, instead functioning as a speculative lens to rethink human–animal relations. He contends that the narrative uses empathy as the primary key for the player to understand and navigate this ecosystem, advocating for a mode of coexistence that recognises the value of nonhuman life over human dominance.

Andrei Nae and Eirini Bourontzi analyse the mechanical ecosystem as a site of "colonial realism", arguing that the gameplay reinforces colonial and capitalist forms of domination. They point to the Focus (Note: The Focus is an augmented reality device that can do things like scan enemies, provide environmental information, and mark targets.) and the in-game map as primary colonial tools; the Focus superimposes a "capitalist colonial gaze" that reduces the machines to their "exchange value", while the map facilitates territorial expansion. Because the RPG economy requires the player to systematically hunt and dismantle machines for loot to fund necessary upgrades, Nae and Bourontzi assert that the player is conditioned to act as a "colonial entrepreneur". Further analysing the machines' origins, they observed that the ancient military robots use ancient Egyptian nomenclature, such as the Scarab, Khopesh, and Horus, to define them as antagonists through a Eurocentric moral binary. They also evaluate the franchise against Victor Navarro-Remesal's criteria for a "green video game", concluding that it fails because the machines infinitely respawn and their destroyed chassis eventually vanish without lasting environmental consequence. This design, they argue, promotes a neoliberal ideal of "infinite growth in an infinitely regenerating world", where the mechanical ecosystem is treated merely as a commodity for exploitation rather than a community requiring moral consideration.

Other critics have interpreted the human-machine relationship in a much more positive, symbiotic light. In an analysis published by First Person Scholar, Ian Faith argued that the machines create a "hybrid ecology" where the distinctions between organic and synthetic life, as well as natural selection and artificial selection, become arbitrary. Rather than viewing the hunting of machines as pure capitalist exploitation, Faith wrote that the human tribes practice a healthy relationship with the mechanical ecosystem. By using every part of the machine's "carcass" for clothing, weaponry, and cultural items, the games depict a landscape where production and consumption are moderated with little waste. Lauren Woolbright analysed the mechanical ecosystem through the lens of Gaia theory, observing that while the game pits nature against technology, the machines show how deeply intertwined the two concepts can be when guided by an environmental ethics of care.

Alenda Y. Chang called attention to the "materiality" of the machines, and pointed out a dissonance between the game's environmentalist themes and the large infrastructure of server farms and hardware required to sustain the mechanical ecosystem's high-resolution textures. Critics have also analysed the creation of the machines as an example of the modern video game industry's reliance on globalised labour. While the overarching designs were conceptualised by Guerrilla in the Netherlands, the 3D modelling of the machines' hydraulic joints, armour plates, and internal components was outsourced to studios in other countries, including Virtuos in China. The Outline's Michael Thomsen argued that the machines' visual fidelity is the product of an industrialized, outsourced pipeline that obscures individual artistic contributions, a process that has led to outsourcing studios being characterized as "asset farms."

=== Cultural impact and merchandise ===
The machines' designs have inspired real-world creations and marketing installations. For E3 2016 to promote Zero Dawn, Sony collaborated with special effects company Spectral Motion to construct a 13-foot-long (4 m), cable-driven animatronic Watcher suit piloted by an operator. During the launch of Forbidden West in 2022, PlayStation commissioned life-sized Clawstrider statues as temporary public installations in cities across five continents, including Dubai, London, New York City, Seoul, and Sydney.

An official Zero Dawn comic book series published by Titan Comics expanded the machines' narrative. In 2020, Steamforged Games released Horizon Zero Dawn: The Board Game, a semi-cooperative miniatures tabletop game. Multiple expansion sets added miniatures of various machines including the Thunderjaw, Stormbird, and the bear-like Fireclaw. The machines also make cameo appearances in other video games. A crossover event for Monster Hunter: World (2018) included machine-themed armour, and holographic versions of the Watcher and Tallneck appear in Death Stranding (2019). A weapon in Ratchet & Clank: Rift Apart (2021) can summon a Thunderjaw from another dimension, and other machines appear in the Horizon-themed level of Astro Bot (2024).

Coinciding with Zero Dawn's launch in 2017, a special "Horizon Zero Dawn Thunderjaw Collection" included a Thunderjaw statue. That same year, two Watcher Funko Pop variants were released, followed by a Thunderjaw Pop in 2020. Also in 2020, Prime 1 Studio announced a 1:4 scale statue of the Stalker. More items coincided with the launch of Forbidden West in 2022. The game's Collector's and Regalla editions contained statues of the Tremortusk. That same year, The Lego Group released a 1,222-piece set of the Tallneck. A 15-inch (38 cm) Moderoid model kit of the Thunderjaw by Good Smile Company was released in 2023. In 2025, a Lego set based on Lego Horizon Adventures included buildable versions of the Shell-Walker and Sawtooth. Later that year, Wizards of the Coast announced a Magic: The Gathering Secret Lair Drop with alternate-art reskins of cards depicting the Thunderjaw, Horus, Tallneck, and Plowhorn.
