= Firesprite =

British video game developer

- Type: Subsidiary
- Industry: Video games
- Founded: 2012; 14 years ago
- Founders: Graeme Ankers; Lee Carus; Chris Roberts; Stuart Tilley; Stuart Lovegrove
- Headquarters: Liverpool, England
- Key people: John O'Brien (Studio Head)
- Services: Video game development
- Number of employees: 146 (2025)
- Parent: PlayStation Studios (2021–present)
- Website: Official website

Firesprite is a British video game developer based in Liverpool. It was established in 2012 by former members of Studio Liverpool. In September 2021, Sony Interactive Entertainment, who had been the parent of Studio Liverpool, acquired the company, making it a first-party developer for PlayStation Studios.

== History ==
Firesprite was founded in 2012 by Graeme Ankers as managing director, Lee Carus as art director, Chris Roberts as technical director, Stuart Tilley as game director, and Stuart Lovegrove as programming director. The studio is staffed by some developers that were part of Psygnosis and the five people in the studio's core leadership team have worked on games for every PlayStation console. Psygnosis was mostly known for the Wipeout series.

In 2013, the team worked on the visuals of one of the launch titles for the PlayStation 4, an augmented reality tech demo, The Playroom. Run Sackboy! Run! followed on mobile devices in 2014 and received mixed reviews. Again in collaboration with SIE Japan Studio, and one of the launch titles for PlayStation VR, The Playroom VR was created "in Japan Studio by the same team that brought you The Playroom on PS4" and released in 2016.

Following up in May 2019 it was announced that an update would be released soon for The Persistence. Launching as a free update for owners of the game, the Complete Edition will bring The Persistence to flat-screen TVs for the first time.

In March 2021, the company announced a partnership with Cloud Imperium Games to work on Theaters of War (working title), a large scale combined arms multiplayer game mode in development for its game Star Citizen. Their partnership started in early 2019 after Cloud Imperium outlined its vision for the game mode, but in April 2022, development of Theaters of War was transferred back to an internal Cloud Imperium vehicle tech team. According to Tyler Witkin in a Spectrum post, "work with Firesprite has ended."

In September 2021, Sony Interactive Entertainment announced that it had acquired the studio. Later in the month, Sony acquired Fabrik Games, a studio founded by Firesprite co-founder Ankers, "in connection with Firesprite joining PlayStation Studios". This brought the studio's headcount to 265. In February 2024, it was reported that layoffs were taking place at Firesprite in conjunction with Sony's cuts across the company. The studio's previously unrevealed Twisted Metal live service game was also cancelled.

On 29 February 2024 Eurogamer published an investigation into Firesprite that found the company had devolved into a chaotic and toxic work environment. After the acquisition by Sony, crunch was implemented in order to finish Horizon Call of the Mountain and staff left in droves following a retention bonus payout in October 2023. Once all but one of the original founders left the studio, executives from Sony's XDev support studio took over. Multiple employees reported the studio's new leadership for sexual discrimination and ageism, but allegations were reportedly dismissed by Sony.

== Games developed ==
Title	Year	Platforms	Note(s)
The Playroom	2013	PlayStation 4 with PlayStation Camera	Additional work
Run Sackboy! Run!	2014	PlayStation Vita, Android, iOS	
Air Force Special Ops: Nightfall	2017	PlayStation 4 with PlayStation VR	
The Persistence	2018	PlayStation 4 with PlayStation VR, PlayStation 5, Xbox One, Xbox Series X/S, Nintendo Switch, Windows	
Horizon Call of the Mountain	2023	PlayStation 5 with PlayStation VR2	Co-developed with Guerrilla Games
Until Dawn 2	2027	PlayStation 5	
