= Joris de Man =

Dutch composer and sound designer

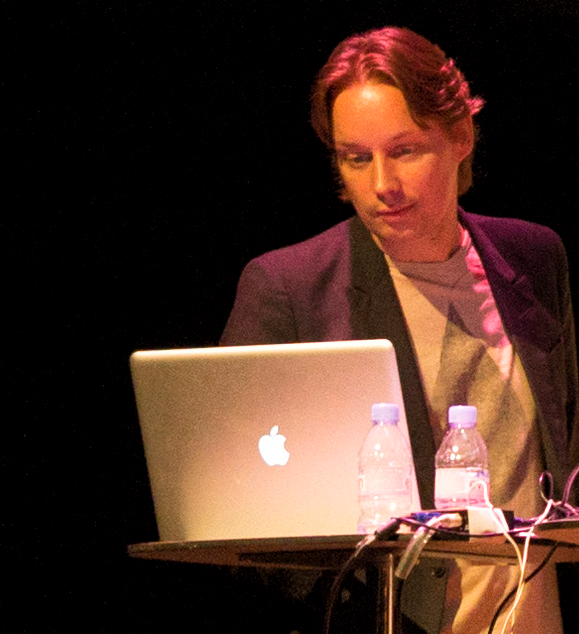
- De Man at Game Music Connect in 2013
- Born: 30 June 1972 (age 53); The Hague, South Holland, Netherlands
- Occupation: Composer
- Website: http://www.jorisdeman.com/

Joris Maarten de Man (born 30 June 1972) is a Dutch composer and sound designer, known for his work on the video games Killzone and Horizon Zero Dawn.

== Career ==
De Man's first work involving video games was chip music written for Atari computers under the moniker "Scavenger." He was also employed as a freelance composer writing for CD-i games in The Netherlands from 1991 to 1992. He spent three years working in London for the Bitmap Brothers on sound design and music composition. In 1999, he returned to the Netherlands and found work with Guerrilla Games.

He has also written music for various film and television projects. He also led the composition of the soundtrack for Horizon Zero Dawn, along with The Flight and Niels van der Leest. De Man has composed a new soundtrack for the Vainglory new 5v5 game mode. De Man composed the score alongside The Flight, Niels van der Leest and Oleksa Lozowchuk in the video game Horizon Forbidden West.

== Awards ==
Joris de Man won the Ivor Novello Award for Best Original Video Game Score for Killzone 2. In 2018, he won the award a second time for his work on Horizon Zero Dawn.
