= The Flight (band) =

English musical duo

- Genres: Video game score, pop music
- Occupations: Music producers, songwriters, composers
- Years active: 2005–present
- Members: Joe Henson; Alexis Smith
- Website: www.theflightmusicofficial.com

The Flight are an English musical duo consisting of Joe Henson and Alexis Smith. The duo has written songs and composed for film, TV shows and video games. Joe Henson started his professional music career as a touring bass player, most notably in the band the Freestylers.

== Discography ==
=== Video games ===
Video games
Title	Year	System	Notes	Ref.
Zubo	2008	Nintendo DS	—N/a	
Spare Parts	2011	PlayStation 3, Xbox 360	—N/a	
LittleBigPlanet PS Vita	2012	PlayStation Vita	"The Lost Arcade" track	
Assassin's Creed IV: Black Flag	2013	Windows, Wii U, PlayStation 3, PlayStation 4, Xbox 360, Xbox One, Nintendo Switch	Multiplayer music	
LittleBigPlanet 3	2014	PlayStation 3, PlayStation 4	"Manglewood" track	
Alien: Isolation	2014	Windows, Linux, OS X, PlayStation 3, PlayStation 4, Xbox 360, Xbox One, Nintendo Switch	Composed with Christian Henson; Themes by Jerry Goldsmith	
Horizon Zero Dawn	2017	Windows, PlayStation 4	Composed with Joris de Man	
Assassin's Creed Odyssey	2018	Windows, PlayStation 4, Xbox One, Nintendo Switch	—N/a	
Horizon Forbidden West	2022	Windows, PlayStation 4, PlayStation 5	Composed with Joris de Man, Niels van der Leest and Oleksa Lozowchuk	
Gotham Knights	2022	Windows, PlayStation 5, Xbox Series X/S	—N/a	
Assassin's Creed Shadows	2025	Windows, macOS, PlayStation 5, Xbox Series X/S	—N/a	
007 First Light	2026	Windows, PlayStation 5, Xbox Series X/S, Nintendo Switch 2	—N/a	

=== Television ===
Television
Title	Year	Notes	Ref.
Made	2011	MTV series Theme music composers	
Kids on the Edge	2016	Channel 4 documentary	
No Man Left Behind	2016	National Geographic documentary series	
Drugsland	2017	BBC One documentary series	
Lockwood & Co.	2023	Netflix series	
