= Guerrilla Games =

Dutch video game developer

Guerrilla B.V.
- Logo used since 2013
- Trade name: Guerrilla Games
- Formerly: Lost Boys Games (2000–2003)
- Type: Subsidiary
- Industry: Video games
- Predecessors: Orange Games; Digital Infinity; Formula Game Development
- Founded: 1 January 2000; 26 years ago
- Founders: Arjan Brussee; Martin de Ronde; Michiel Mol; Arnout van der Kamp
- Headquarters: Amsterdam, Netherlands
- Key people: Joel Eschler (studio head); Jan-Bart van Beek (studio director)
- Products: Killzone series (2004–2013); Horizon series (2017–present)
- Number of employees: 385 (2025)
- Parent: Lost Boys (2000–2001); Media Republic (2003–2005); PlayStation Studios (2005–present)
- Website: guerrilla-games.com

Guerrilla B.V. (trade name: Guerrilla Games) is a Dutch first-party video game developer based in Amsterdam and part of PlayStation Studios. The company was founded as Lost Boys Games in January 2000 through the merger of three smaller development studios as a subsidiary of multimedia conglomerate company Lost Boys. Lost Boys Games became independent the following year and was acquired by Media Republic in 2003, renaming the studio to Guerrilla Games before being purchased by Sony Computer Entertainment in 2005. As of 2025, the company employs 385 people under the leadership of joint studio directors Jan-Bart van Beek, Joel Eschler and Hella Schmidt. It is best known for the Killzone and Horizon game series.

== History ==
Guerrilla Games originated from the merger of three Dutch video game studios on 1 January 2000, forming a new entity initially known as Lost Boys Games. The merging studios were Orange Games, founded in 1993 by Arjan Brussee, the co-designer of the 1994 game Jazz Jackrabbit; Digital Infinity, founded by Arnout van der Kamp in 1995; and Formula Game Development, founded by Martin de Ronde in 1998 and sold to Lost Boys (a multimedia conglomerate company owned by Michiel Mol) in 1999. This consolidation created a unified team under the umbrella of Lost Boys, of which the new studio became a subsidiary. With de Ronde as managing director, the new company employed 25 people, growing to 40 by November 2000. Hermen Hulst was hired from a consulting firm to replace de Ronde as managing director the following year. In 2001, when Lost Boys merged with Swedish media company IconMediaLab, Lost Boys Games was spun off as an independent entity, with Mol retaining ownership.

Lost Boys Games began developing Game Boy Color games with original characters, but the studio found that publishers would rather release games including licensed characters. Because the studio did not want to compromise on significantly altering the characters it had created, it was unable to find a publisher for them. Consequently, Lost Boys Games moved on to work-for-hire projects, creating four handheld games: Dizzy's Candy Quest (Game Boy Color, 2001), Rhino Rumble (Game Boy Color, 2002), Black Belt Challenge (Game Boy Advance, 2002), and Invader (Game Boy Advance, 2002). The latter two games were published by Xicat Interactive. Mol later established a new media company, Media Republic, which acquired 75% of Lost Boys Games in 2003. Shortly thereafter, in July 2003, Lost Boys Games rebranded as Guerrilla Games to better align with Media Republic's image.

The developer soon began work on its two titles: Killzone (in development for Sony Computer Entertainment for the PlayStation 2) and Shellshock: Nam '67 (in development for Eidos Interactive for the PlayStation 2, Xbox and Microsoft Windows). Both titles would be released the following year to mixed reception, however Killzone enjoyed pre-release hype and anticipation, and despite some backfire effect due to the media hype, Killzone went on to sell over a million copies worldwide, earning Greatest Hits and Platinum status in North America and Europe respectively. Guerrilla signed an exclusive development agreement with Sony Computer Entertainment in March 2004, that would see future development solely for Sony's line of video game consoles, the PlayStation 2, PlayStation Portable, and PlayStation 3.

By late 2005, many companies, like Eidos Interactive, eyed purchasing Guerrilla; ultimately, Sony Computer Entertainment bought out the entirety of Guerrilla in December 2005. Guerrilla went on to release Killzone: Liberation for the PlayStation Portable in October 2006, Killzone 2 for the PlayStation 3 in February 2009, and Killzone 3 for the PlayStation 3 in February 2011.

By February 2012, co-founder Brussee had left the studio to join Visceral Games. As of June 2018, Guerrilla employs 250 people in its Amsterdam offices; it planned to move into a new building on Nieuwezijds Voorburgwal in early 2019 and expand to at least 400 employees in this new location. In November 2019, Hulst was appointed the head of Worldwide Studios and Angie Smets, Jan-Bart van Beek and Michiel van der Leeuw became joint studio heads in his place.

During the 2015 E3 conference, Guerrilla unveiled a new intellectual property, Horizon Zero Dawn described as a "post-apocalyptic open world action role-playing game that follows the story of Aloy, a young huntress who inhabits a world that is overrun by machines, and attempts to journey across several lands to uncover her past."

In 2017, Guerrilla released Horizon Zero Dawn on the PlayStation 4. The game received widespread positive acclaim from various critics. An expansion, The Frozen Wilds, was released in November 2017. By February 2018, over 7.6 million copies had been sold, increasing to over 10 million a year later, making it one of the best-selling PlayStation 4 games. In March 2020, Hermen Hulst confirmed in an interview that Horizon Zero Dawn would receive a PC port. The PC version was released on 7 August 2020.

The next game in development, Horizon Forbidden West, was first revealed at the 2020 PS5 Future of Gaming event on 11 June 2020. It is a sequel to Horizon Zero Dawn. The game released on 18 February 2022. In August 2020, Guerrilla Games moved into its new studio space. On 4 January 2022, Guerilla and Firesprite revealed that a new Horizon game is in the works for PlayStation VR2 titled Horizon Call of the Mountain. In December 2022, Sony announced that an expansion for Horizon Forbidden West named Burning Shores was released in April 2023 on the PlayStation 5.

In April 2023, Guerrilla Games announced multiple changes to its studio management. Co-studio head Angie Smets left the studio to become the new Head of Development Strategy at PlayStation Studios, with co-studio head Michiel van der Leeuw changing roles in which he would focus on the continuing development of the Decima engine. As part of these changes, Joel Eschler and Hella Schmidt joined Jan-Bart van Beek as the studio's new studio directors.

== Technology ==
Guerrilla uses a proprietary game engine now known as Decima. The Decima engine is also used by other developers, such as Kojima Productions who use it for the Death Stranding series. In April 2023, Guerrilla Games announced that the studio's technical director Michiel van der Leeuw would be focusing on the development of the engine.

== Games developed ==
=== As Lost Boys Games ===
Year	Title	Platform(s)	Publisher(s)	Ref.
2001	Dizzy's Candy Quest	Game Boy Color	Swing! Entertainment	
2002	Rhino Rumble	Game Boy Color	Telegames	
2002	Black Belt Challenge	Game Boy Advance	Xicat Interactive	
2002	Invader	Game Boy Advance	Xicat Interactive	

=== As Guerrilla Games ===
Year	Title	Platform(s)	Publisher(s)	Notes	Ref.
2004	Shellshock: Nam '67	PlayStation 2, Windows, Xbox	Eidos Interactive	—N/a	
2004	Killzone	PlayStation 2	Sony Computer Entertainment	—N/a	
2006	Killzone: Liberation	PlayStation Portable	Sony Computer Entertainment	—N/a	
2009	Killzone 2	PlayStation 3	Sony Computer Entertainment	—N/a	
2011	Killzone 3	PlayStation 3	Sony Computer Entertainment	—N/a	
2013	Killzone Shadow Fall	PlayStation 4	Sony Computer Entertainment	—N/a	
2017	Horizon Zero Dawn	PlayStation 4, PlayStation 5, Windows	Sony Interactive Entertainment	Also developed the expansion pack The Frozen Wilds (2017)	
2022	Horizon Forbidden West	PlayStation 4, PlayStation 5, Windows	Sony Interactive Entertainment	Also developed the expansion pack Burning Shores (2023)	
2023	Horizon Call of the Mountain	PlayStation 5	Sony Interactive Entertainment	Co-developed with Firesprite	
2024	Lego Horizon Adventures	Nintendo Switch, PlayStation 5, Windows	Sony Interactive Entertainment	Co-developed with Studio Gobo	
TBA	Horizon Hunters Gathering	PlayStation 5, Windows	Sony Interactive Entertainment	Co-op multiplayer spin-off	
TBA	Untitled Horizon Forbidden West sequel	TBA	Sony Interactive Entertainment	—N/a	
