= Decima (game engine) =

Video game engine

- Decima in action on Horizon Zero Dawn: graphic quality exhibited by the game engine was among the most praised elements of Horizon.
- Original author: Guerrilla Games
- Developers: Guerrilla Games; Kojima Productions
- Release: November 2013; 12 years ago
- Middleware: Havok
- Operating system: PlayStation 4; PlayStation 5; Microsoft Windows; macOS; iOS; iPadOS; Xbox Series X/S
- Platform: x86-64
- Standards: The Windows and Xbox port use DirectX 12 API; The macOS, iOS, iPadOS port use Metal API
- License: Proprietary
- Website: www.guerrilla-games.com/read/decima

Decima is a proprietary game engine made by Guerrilla Games and released in November 2013, that includes tools and features like artificial intelligence and game physics. It is compatible with 4K resolution and high-dynamic-range imaging. Available in some games on PlayStation 4, PlayStation 5, Microsoft Windows, macOS, iOS, iPadOS, and Xbox Series X/S, the engine is used on notable franchises such as Death Stranding, Horizon, Killzone, and Until Dawn.

== History ==
The first game the engine was used for was Killzone: Shadow Fall. In June 2015, Guerrilla Games announced that Horizon Zero Dawn was using the engine for development. In August 2015, Until Dawn was announced to be using the engine along with Havok physics. In December 2015, Until Dawn: Rush of Blood used the engine along with PlayStation VR. In June 2016, Hideo Kojima announced preparation for Kojima Productions' independent game Death Stranding, inspecting two engine candidates, of which the latter had been used to create the first teaser that was unveiled at the E3 2016 conference. After receiving the Industry Icon award at The Game Awards 2016, Kojima premiered a trailer for the game with the engine's logo. At PlayStation Experience, Kojima had announced that he had partnered with Guerrilla Games, using the engine for development on Death Stranding.

According to executive producer Angie Smets, Decima was originally known simply as "the engine" by Guerrilla employees, as there were initially no plans to publicly offer this technology to game developers outside of the company. However, the newly forged partnership with Kojima Productions meant that Guerrilla suddenly had to give the engine a name for marketing purposes in late 2016; they chose to symbolize the Dutch-Japanese partnership by naming it after Dejima, a former Japanese island that was home to a major Dutch Empire trading post during the Edo period.

Guerrilla's most recent title, Horizon Forbidden West, used an updated version of the engine. The game was released for PlayStation 4 and PlayStation 5 on February 18, 2022.

In December 2022, the engine is used again for Death Stranding 2: On the Beach. The game has an improved version of the engine. It was released on the PlayStation 5 platform and features PlayStation 5 Pro Enhanced (PSSR) functionality. The game was released on June 26, 2025.

== Features ==
During PlayStation Experience in December 2016, it was revealed that the engine had artificial intelligence, game physics, and logic tools, featuring resources for creating entire worlds. It is capable of 4K resolution and high-dynamic-range imaging.

For Horizon Forbidden West, rather than using a proprietary physics engine, Decima incorporated and built on an open-source physics engine called Jolt.

== Games ==
Title	Year(s)	Developer(s)	Platform(s)
Killzone: Shadow Fall	2013	Guerrilla Games	PlayStation 4
Until Dawn	2015	Supermassive Games	PlayStation 4
Until Dawn: Rush of Blood	2016	Supermassive Games	PlayStation 4
RIGS: Mechanized Combat League	2016	Guerrilla Cambridge	PlayStation 4
Horizon Zero Dawn	2017	Guerrilla Games	PlayStation 4 Microsoft Windows; PlayStation 5
Death Stranding	2019	Kojima Productions	PlayStation 4 Microsoft Windows; PlayStation 5 macOS iOS iPadOS; Xbox Series X/S
Horizon Forbidden West	2022	Guerrilla Games	PlayStation 4 PlayStation 5 Microsoft Windows
Death Stranding 2: On the Beach	2025	Kojima Productions	PlayStation 5 Microsoft Windows
