= Killzone Shadow Fall =

2013 video game

- Developer: Guerrilla Games
- Publisher: Sony Computer Entertainment
- Director: Steven ter Heide
- Designer: Eric Boltjes
- Programmer: Michiel van der Leeuw
- Artists: Misja Baas; Jan-Bart van Beek
- Composers: Tyler Bates; Lorn
- Series: Killzone
- Engine: Decima
- Platform: PlayStation 4
- Release: NA: 15 November 2013; EU: 29 November 2013
- Genre: First-person shooter
- Modes: Single-player, multiplayer

Killzone Shadow Fall is a 2013 first-person shooter video game developed by Guerrilla Games and published by Sony Computer Entertainment for the PlayStation 4. It is the sixth and most recent installment of the Killzone series. Killzone Shadow Fall was released on 15 November 2013 as a launch title for the PlayStation 4 in North America and 29 November 2013 in Europe. Taking place 30 years after the events of Killzone 3, Shadow Fall follows a new set of characters, putting players in the role of Lucas Kellan, a "Shadow Marshal", who is investigating a rising threat in the continuing war between Vekta and the Helghast.

As the first game in the series made for Sony's next-gen console, Killzone Shadow Fall received a number of changes to the series formula. The single-player campaign is more open-ended and stealth-based than its predecessors, and the multiplayer modes feature new customization options for weapons. The game also introduced a new proprietary in-house game engine called Decima.

The game received mixed reception overall; it received praise for its visuals and multiplayer modes, while criticism was directed towards the game's single-player mode and several gameplay features, although several critics appreciated the game's attempt to change direction from its predecessors, as well as its more open-ended level design. Critics also criticized the title's lack of innovation as one of the first eighth generation games. As of January 2014, the game has sold over 2.1 million copies, making it the first PlayStation 4 game to surpass the million copy mark and one of the best-selling PlayStation 4 games. Online servers were shut down on 12 August 2022.

== Gameplay ==
Like its predecessors, Shadow Fall is a first-person shooter in a science fiction setting. Staple weapons such as the M82 Assault Rifle, stA-52 Assault Rifle, and stA-18 pistol return from the earlier Killzone games, albeit in new forms and variations. New weapons include the LSR44, a recoil-free, hybrid assault/charge sniper rifle that functions much like a miniaturized rail-gun, and the OWL, an advanced hovering attack drone (used by the Shadow Marshals) that can attack/stun when it is adjacent to an adversary, as well as deploy an instant zip line, protect the player from enemy fire with an energy shield, and hack/scan terminals and enemy alarms to prevent reinforcements from arriving.

While the previous games in the Killzone series portrayed a large war-zone with numerous allies by the players side at any given time and an overall linear design, Shadow Fall opts for a more open-ended level design and allows players to utilize stealth to approach their missions in addition to engaging in direct confrontations with enemies. Levels are much more open than in previous games, allowing for multiple ways/routes to complete objectives. Also in Shadow Fall, for the first half of the campaign, the player is alone in firefights, with the OWL as the player's only "companion", which is able to lay down cover fire, among other abilities. During the second half onward, the player is occasionally joined by Echo as an ally, where she is able to snipe enemies marked by the player.

Multiplayer shipped with 10 maps. Users are encouraged to create their own custom map presets called "Warzones", which then can be shared with others or promoted by the Killzone community. Classes, abilities and weapons are unlocked from the start. The class system has been simplified to just three: Assault, Scout and Support (with some medic abilities from previous games now subsumed under "Support"). The player unlocks skill enhancements based on completing challenges unique to his class. Alongside competitive multiplayer, a 4-player online co-operative mode was introduced with the Intercept expansion pack, released on 24 June 2014.

== Synopsis ==
=== Setting ===
Following the Petrusite detonation that rendered the planet Helghan uninhabitable in Killzone 3 (an event now referred to as "The Terracide"), the ISA grants refuge to the Helghast survivors on the planet Vekta, allowing them to colonize half the planet, with that half of the planet dubbed New Helghan. A massive security fortification called The Wall is constructed to separate the two civilizations from each other, due to the resentment they bear over the previous war. Both the Vektans and Helghast routinely perform covert operations against each other in the hope of finishing the war each claims the other started. The majority of the game takes place in Vekta City, home to the Vektan Security Agency (VSA) headquarters, as well as a prison in New Helghan, and Helghan, the original homeworld of the Helghast, now dead and shattered due to the Petrusite detonation.

=== Plot ===
The game begins in the year 2370, several years after the construction of "The Wall", during the forced relocation of Vektans out of New Helghan. Michael Kellan and his 5-year-old son, Lucas, attempt to sneak through New Helghan to The Wall. Along the way, they meet Sinclair, a Shadow Marshal, who aids them in making it through to safety. Just as the group makes it to The Wall, Helghast forces spot them and kill Michael. After Sinclair dispatches the remaining forces, he promises Lucas that he will look after him. A brief cutscene plays, showing Lucas rising through the ranks of the Shadow Marshal Academy, eventually becoming a full-fledged Shadow Marshal and working under Sinclair's command.

Twenty years later, tensions between the Vektans and Helghast have reached a boiling point. Kellan, who let himself be captured by the Helghast as part of an investigation, is being brought across The Wall as part of a prisoner exchange for a Helghast agent named Echo. After the exchange, Kellan is ordered to return to the Helghan side of The Wall in order to retrieve classified data. Kellan recovers the classified information and makes a bold escape out of the area. Using the recovered data, Sinclair sends Kellan to the ISC "Cassandra", a classified research ship, to destroy evidence of a bio-tech weapon being created by head scientist Dr. Hillary Massar and send the "Cassandra" into the nearby sun. Once on the station, Kellan encounters Echo, who escapes with Massar in tow; while Kellan makes it off the ship just as it drifts into the sun.

Upon arriving at VSA headquarters, a massive explosion rips through the building, killing several civilians and soldiers. Through the confusion, Kellan meets up with Sinclair just as a broadcast comes through from Vladko Tyran, leader of "The Black Hand", a paramilitary terrorist group, claiming responsibility for the attack. As a result of the terrorism, all Helghast citizens residing on the Vektan side of The Wall are deported to New Helghan. Sinclair sends Kellan undercover with the rest of the refugees in order to locate Tyran. Eventually he finds Tyran and learns that he is working for Jorhan Stahl (having survived the events of Killzone 3), who plans to use Massar's bio-tech weapon that has been altered to target Vektans. Shortly after, Kellan is taken captive.

Kellan is approached by Echo in his cell. He informs her that Stahl plans to use Massar's bio-tech weapon to kill Vektans and half-breeds alike, including Echo (who is half-Vektan, half-Helghast). Echo, who is revealed to be Lady Hera Visari's daughter, is displeased with Visari for being in league with Stahl and planning to ignite another war. She helps Kellan escape his cell and returns him to the Vektan side of The Wall in order to convince the VSA to stand down. Upon his return, Sinclair ignores Kellan's pleas to stand down, outraged that he is siding with Echo. Instead, Sinclair informs him that the VSA have tracked Massar to a massive mining spire in orbit over the planet Helghan, and dispatches him to recover the doctor. Kellan infiltrates the main spire and finds Massar. She states that the bio-weapon is now with Stahl, being prepped for its final test. Sinclair orders Kellan to take Massar into custody, but Echo arrives and kills Massar as Kellan watches on. Now viewed as a traitor by Sinclair, Kellan teams up with Echo, and the two descend to Helghan to stop Stahl.

Once the duo arrive on the destroyed surface of Helghan and head to Stahl's base, they confront and defeat Tyran. Kellan then radios Sinclair, warning him to abort the ISA assault on Stahl, but Sinclair ignores him. As the ISA begin their attack on Stahl's base, Stahl activates Massar's weapon, destroying all of the ISA ships. Echo and Kellan are separated in the chaos. Finally, Kellan reaches Stahl himself, strapped to a life support system due to his advanced age (and presumably due to Petrusite exposure). Stahl claims that the Terracide happened because the weak had to be destroyed, and that it is Vekta's turn to share the same fate, but is suddenly shot dead by Sinclair, who enters the room and also shoots Kellan. As Kellan lies dying, Sinclair says that with the newly reacquired weapon, they can end the Helghast threat forever then apologizes to Kellan before killing him.

A mid-credits scene lets the player take control of Echo, sneaking into Vekta City to assassinate Sinclair during a speech he gives to the Vektans, calling for war against the Helghast. Echo comes to a perch overlooking the ceremony, lines up her shot with a sniper rifle and quietly says "For Kellan..." before pulling the trigger, killing Sinclair and preventing a new war from beginning.

== Development and release ==
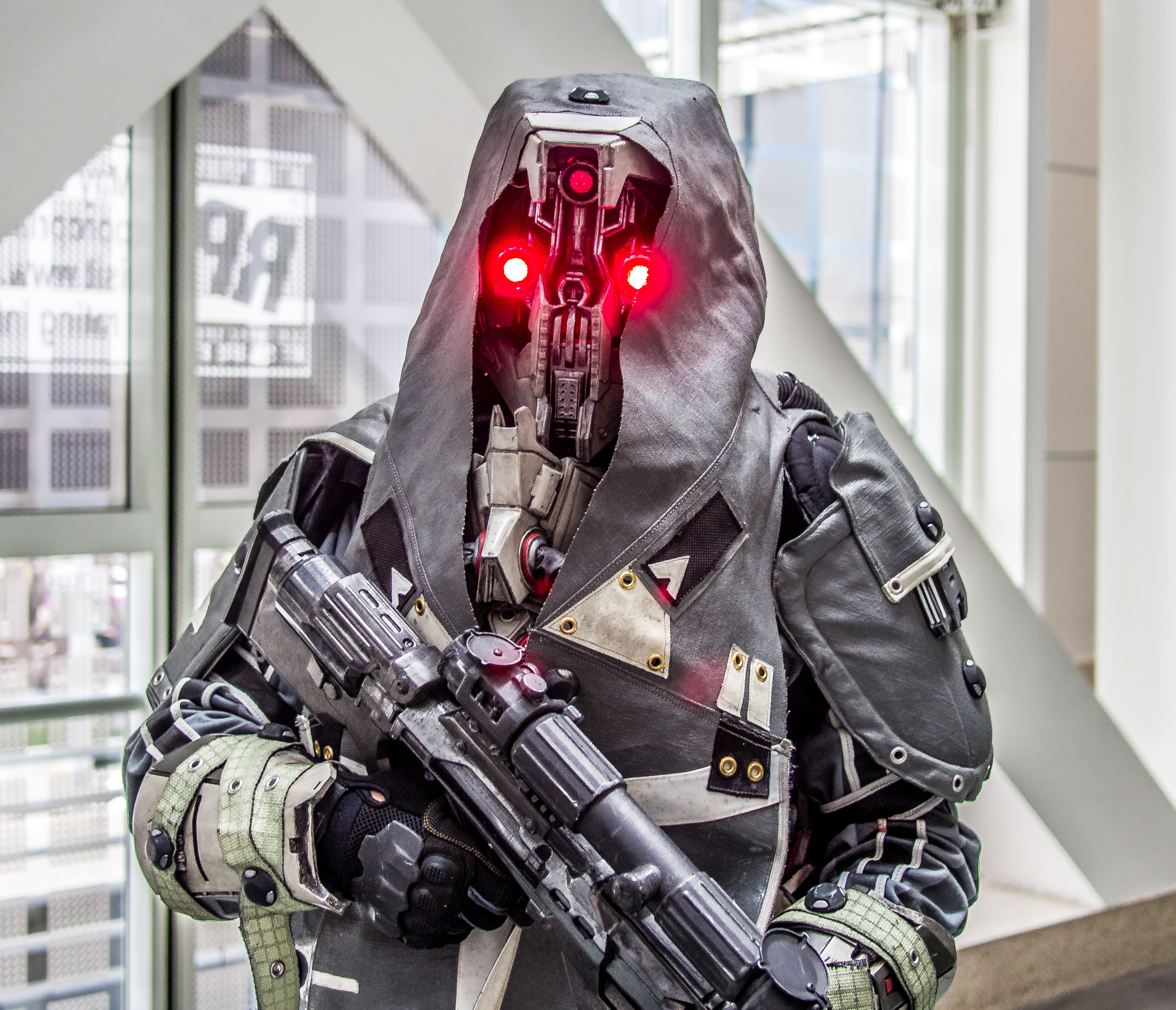
Promotion of the game at E3 2013

Killzone Shadow Fall was seen by Guerrilla Games as an opportunity to revitalize the franchise, since it was established early in development that they would be working on a new platform. The main point during development was to give players more options on how to proceed, particularly during the single-player mode. According to Guerrilla Games, the original size of Killzone Shadow Fall was 290 GB because the game has no assets designed for lower spec systems.

The demo shown during the PlayStation 4's announcement only used 4 GB of memory – not the full 8 GB GDDR5 RAM available to developers in the final hardware, Guerrilla has revealed. According to the studio, 3072 MB (3 GB) of the PS4's 8 GB were dedicated to video resources powering the demo, with 1,536 MB used for system resources. A further 128 MB were shared between the two. Of the 3 GB reserved for video memory, 1,321 MB were used by non-streaming textures. According to Guerrilla, the demo featured 8200 physics objects, 500 particle systems and real-time reflections - which include "a lot of Guerrilla secret sauce". Guerrilla's decision to stick with 4 GB suggest that the developer may not have been aware of Sony's decision to include 8 GB in final retail hardware – something Just Add Water CEO Stewart Gilray told VideoGamer.com had been kept secret from third-party developers until the console's announcement. "We were told [PS4] was 4GB originally and we first knew it had 8GBs when Mark [Cerny] said at the event's stage, 'And it has 8GB of memory'. We'd had kits at that point for a good while."

The game ended development and "went gold" on 21 October 2013. The game was released on 15 November 2013 in North America, and was released on 29 November 2013 in Europe, and on 22 February 2014 in Japan, as a launch title for the PlayStation 4. Participating retailers offered the Shadow Pack as a pre-order bonus. It included three exclusive skins for the OWL combat drone, the MP Spotlight Move (a special victory move to humiliate fallen opponents in multiplayer), and the official soundtrack.

The online servers for the game were shut down on 12 August 2022.

=== Soundtrack ===
Killzone Shadow Fall (Official Game Soundtrack)

Soundtrack album by Tyler Bates and Lorn
- Released: 31 December 2013 (PS4 App Version); 16 September 2014 (iTunes)
- Genres: Ambient, electronic, video game soundtrack
- Length: 1:26:21 (PS4 App Version); 45:20 (Disc 1); 40:58 (Disc 2)

Killzone Shadow Fall is the second game in the series in which Joris de Man did not compose the score, following the PlayStation Vita title Killzone: Mercenary. For Shadow Fall, Tyler Bates and electronica artist Lorn were hired to compose music for the Vekta and Helghan missions, respectively. The style of the soundtrack is vastly different from previous installments, favoring ambient soundscapes and beat-driven electronica over orchestral arrangements.

The official soundtrack for the game received two releases: first, as a standalone app on the PlayStation 4, released on 31 December 2013, and then as a digital download on iTunes, released on 16 September 2014.

== Reception ==
=== Critical response ===
Reception

Aggregate score
Aggregator	Score
Metacritic	73/100

Review scores
Publication	Score
Destructoid	9/10
Eurogamer	7/10
Game Informer	8/10
GameSpot	7/10
GamesRadar+	4/5
IGN	8/10
Polygon	5/10

Killzone Shadow Fall received "mixed or average" reviews, according to review aggregator website Metacritic. It was mostly praised for its visuals and multiplayer mode, but criticism was directed at the game's story and AI problems.

Destructoid's Dale North was very positive of the game; he scored it a 9/10 and said: "I like Killzone: Shadow Fall for its change of direction from previous series games, as well as its change of pace over other first-person shooters. Guerrilla has tried a few new things this time around, and should be commended as such. I welcome the almost sandbox-ish level approach, and the stealth segments did a nice job of breaking up the standard shooting action. It's really nice when gameplay concepts win out over big set pieces and cinematic events. Oh, and it's beautiful. A stunner. Killzone: Shadow Fall is the game that will make you happy to own a PS4."

Oli Welsh's review for Eurogamer scored a 7 out of 10. He praised the visuals, gunplay, movement, level design, and multiplayer, as well as the OWL, which was called a "fun tactical toy". Welsh said "It's a game that any new PlayStation 4 owner will be proud to show off - but it won't be one they remember by the time PS5 rolls around."

In his review for Game Informer, Dan Ryckert scored the game an 8/10 and stated: "When you look past the gorgeous visuals, Killzone: Shadow Fall is a competent shooter in terms of both campaign gameplay and multiplayer offerings. It may not be the most innovative title on the market, but it's certainly one of the top stars of the PlayStation 4's launch lineup."

Kevin VanOrd of GameSpot scored the game a 7 out of 10 and said: "As much as I enjoyed my online time with Killzone: Shadow Fall—and as much as I will enjoy lots more time with it, unlocking perks that allow me to personalize my weapons—I missed Killzone 3's jump pack, which brought a nifty nimbleness to the battlegrounds. I missed it in Shadow Fall's disappointing single-player campaign, too, which sorely needed a shot of adrenaline. Where I look back fondly on Killzone 2's finest single-player moments, the moments I recall here are those in which I wandered through corridors and rocky meadows wondering where the bad guys were. Luckily, Guerrilla Games remembered what drew me and many others to the front lines of online war, and it's here that Shadow Fall emerges from the rubble and flies into the electric skies."

GamesRadar' Ryan Taljonick gave the game a positive review. He scored it a 4/5 and stated: "Killzone: Shadow Fall is an excellent way to kick off the eighth console generation. Sure, its characters may not be all that convincing, and its multiplayer is more a well-crafted distraction than a long-term destination, but the game as a whole contains plenty of unexpected surprises that make it worth your time. The open-ended missions, though not as plentiful as you might like, are made even better thanks to the awesome tools at your disposal, and its story has some powerful moments that are sure to catch you off guard. And even when it hits lulls, you'll still have a great time shooting to your heart's content."

Colin Moriarty of IGN gave a generally positive review, with a score of 8 out of 10. He called it "great", praised the "stunning" graphics, said the multiplayer was "fun" and liked the gameplay improvements. Some negative comments were made concerning the AI and level design. Moriarty summed up the review by saying "There's never been a better time for everyone to be paying attention to the Killzone franchise, because Shadow Fall is a step in an all-new, very welcome direction."

Polygon's review was more harsh, with Arthur Gies giving the game a score of 5 out of 10. Gies praised the visuals but said the game is filled with "shooter cliches" and is marred by poor execution. "Shadow Fall looks like the future, but it's stuck in the past," Gies said. "In a launch lineup crowded with shooters, Killzone: Shadow Fall sits at the bottom."

The game received several awards after its release, including the Best PS4 Shooter and Best PS4 Graphics by IGN. It also received the People's Choice awards on both categories.

=== Sales ===
The game was a commercial success, selling almost 800,000 copies as of 25 December 2013. As of 2 March 2014 it has sold over 2.1 million copies.

=== Lawsuit ===
On 5 August 2014, Sony was sued for $5 million in a class action lawsuit. Sony was accused of "deceptive marketing" because the game's multiplayer mode does not run at the resolution advertised. The case was dismissed on 22 April 2015.
