= Visari =

Visari may refer to:

- Visari (surname), a surname from the Native American Tzotzil language common in southern Mexico
- Scolar Visari, the fictional antagonist and leader of the Helghast in the Killzone videogame series
