= Killzone: Mercenary =

2013 video game

- European cover art
- Developer: Guerrilla Cambridge
- Publisher: Sony Computer Entertainment
- Directors: Piers Jackson; Mathijs de Jonge
- Producers: Craig Abraham; Lucas Van Muiswinkel
- Designer: Gareth Hughes
- Artists: Thomas Jones; Matt Tracey
- Composer: Walter Mair
- Series: Killzone
- Platform: PlayStation Vita
- Release: PAL: 4 September 2013; UK: 6 September 2013; NA: 10 September 2013
- Genre: First-person shooter
- Modes: Single-player, multiplayer

Killzone: Mercenary is a 2013 first-person shooter video game developed by Guerrilla Cambridge and published by Sony Computer Entertainment for the PlayStation Vita. It is the fifth installment in the Killzone series and the first to not be developed by Guerrilla Games.

Taking place throughout key events and locations of the first three installments of the Killzone franchise, Mercenary follows the story of Arran Danner, a mercenary hired by the ISA.

Mercenary was met with positive critical reception for its quality as a portable-console first-person shooter. Praise was given to the game's controls and visuals, while criticism was aimed at its story and campaign length. Online servers were shut down on 12 August 2022.

== Gameplay ==
In-game screenshot of the single-player campaign mode, depicting the HUD layout

For the first time in a Killzone campaign, players can fight alongside Helghast forces as well as ISA specialists, carrying out missions that regular soldiers cannot. As a mercenary, players are free to decide which tactics and load outs they will use to fulfill their contract; employers will reward players with money if successfully completed. The game utilizes the PS Vita's touchscreen and rear touch panel.

== Plot ==
=== Setting ===
Killzone: Mercenary takes place on the planets Vekta and Helghan, locked in an interstellar war. The game is set in between Killzone 2 and Killzone 3 and revisits many of the key events of Killzone, Killzone: Liberation, and Killzone 2 from the perspective of Arran Danner, a mercenary hired to execute operations for the ISA. He is supplied by mysterious weapons dealer Blackjack, and is aided at times by his boss Anders Benoit.

=== Story ===
The game starts with the Helghast invasion of Vekta. Mercenaries Arran Danner and his partner Damian Ivanov are tasked by their boss – Anders Benoit to arrive in the Vektan city of Diortem on a mission to rescue ISA Admiral Alex Grey from Helghast forces using location information gained by the Vektan Ambassador – Sepp Harkin. Danner and Ivanov fight their way through the Vektan Halls of Justice where she is being held. They witness Helghast Colonel Kratek attempting to execute her, but manage to extract her safely. The two then make their way to a downed Helghan cruiser which is attempting to escape with stolen ISA weapons technology. The cruiser also has the transmission codes for all of the Helghast forces so obtaining the codes is vital to the ISA. Danner hacks into the cruisers computers and obtains the codes, however whilst sabotaging the cruiser power supply Ivanov is caught in a booby trap and sacrifices himself to destroy the ship. Despite the casualty the mission is deemed a success.

Two years later the theater of war shifts to Helghan, the Helghast home planet. Danner disables part of the Arc Cannon system in order to open a window for invading ISA forces as because of them the invasion has stalled. He then attempts to rescue the Vektan Ambassador and his family (as the leaking of Admiral Grey's location has been discovered by the Helghast) from the Vektan Embassy in Pyrrhus City, however the Ambassador and his Helghast wife are killed in the crossfire except for their son, Justus, meanwhile a Helghast scientist and defector named Savic escapes the embassy in the chaos. With the help of the Ambassador's bodyguard 'Boris', Danner and Justus make it to the boats beneath the Embassy and escape. Rather than make their way directly back to ISA Headquarters, Danner is ordered by Benoit to divert and take Justus to a Helghast 'smoker tower' where Savic has escaped to as he wishes to defect and has information which is vital the ISA. They need to extract Savic before the Helghast find him, hence the urgency. Danner and Justus make their way through the Helghast infested cliff sides where they eventually find Savic in a bar. Savic reveals that he had created a weaponized virus capable of wiping out the entire population of either planet due to genetic targeting of either race's DNA, and fled due to his conscience. He rendered it inert before defecting, with the key to reactivating it lying inside Justus' bloodstream. Savic had hoped that if Kratek had the inert base of the virus and the ISA had the trigger (in Justus's bloodstream) then neither side would be able to use the virus. Danner engages the Helghast forces which provides enough of a distraction that Savic and Justus safely make their way to the extraction point where Admiral Grey personally meets them.

Afterwards Danner's next mission is to a nearby Petrusite reactor complex to cut the power to the remaining air defenses. However, as he destroys the final reactor, Benoit cuts him off and leaves him for dead as Admiral Grey knows that Danner is the only other person who knows about the controversial virus. Kratek overhears this and retrieves Danner, revealing Grey was planning to use the virus to finally wipe out the entire Helghast population. Kratek has Danner return to the Embassy (which Grey has made her HQ) with a Helghast commando team to obtain the codes to the virus vault from Savic, who was being interrogated for the same codes. Savic gives the codes to Danner after he makes Danner switch off his comms so that Kratek cannot hear the codes. Danner can then choose to leave Savic or execute him. Danner observes Justus being taken to a secret Helghast mobile research facility by Admiral Grey and Benoit so they can activate the virus. After initially being pinned down by some ISA Exoskeletons, Danner is saved by some Helghast tanks.

Danner is then taken by dropship to the Helghast mobile research facility where the virus is held. Following a crash landing, Danner makes his way through the labs and finally obtains a sample of the virus for Kratek. After a firefight Danner escapes, killing Grey in the process, and rescuing Justus. However, the explosives planted by Danner used to destroy the virus activated the explosives planted by the ISA which causes the facility to veer off course. Blackjack, Danner's arms dealer, reveals that Benoit intends to take over the private military company that hired Danner and monopolize the industry. He also informs Danner that Kratek intends to betray him as well (as he only kept Danner alive for knowing the codes to the vault) and seize the completed virus for himself. Danner and Justus fight their way to the flight deck to steal Kratek's dropship which is the only way off the cruiser. Upon reaching the flight deck, Benoit kills Kratek with the intention of seizing the virus and selling it on the black market. Benoit offers Danner a choice: His life or Justus'. Danner only wants the virus destroyed. As the Helghan capital of Pyrrhus is destroyed in a nuclear blast, Danner kills Benoit and several of his mercenaries after a protracted fight. Blackjack extracts Danner and Justus using Kratek's dropship from where Danner destroys the virus to maintain the status quo. Blackjack also erases Danner and Justus' identities as they flee to safety. In the closing sequence, he remarks that he profited off the sale of anti-radiation medication in the wake of the nuclear detonation, and they all stand to continue getting rich from the continuing war. Danner and Justus then go 'off grid'.

== Development and release ==
At Gamescom 2012, it was revealed that the title is Killzone: Mercenary. The game utilizes a modified version of the Killzone 3 rendering engine, allowing volumetric lighting and smoke, high resolution environment textures, gleaming metal, and realistic-looking shadows. It was released in September 2013. Unlike previous Killzone installments, Mercenary was not developed by Guerrilla Games, but instead, their sister studio, Guerrilla Cambridge (formerly SCE Cambridge Studio). A senior producer at the studio said the production time was around less than two years after converting Killzone 3's engine.

In comparison to previous installments, Mercenary would offer "the series' biggest weapon loadout yet". Due to the larger weapon loadout, it accommodates a wider variety of play styles than in past Killzone games. Because of the refined damage model, the weapons apparently "feel slightly more powerful" than those in previous installments.

Sign-ups for the multiplayer closed beta began on 12 July 2013. Candidates had until 17 July to sign-up. The beta provided players with a diverse range of weapons, grenades, armor, and special VAN-Guard devices enabling them to customize their multiplayer load-out slots. This customization supports the tactical element of the game; allowing players to go in like a tank, or take a more precise approach and assassinate enemies stealthily. The game was released in 2013 in Europe and Australia on 4 September, in the United Kingdom on 6 September, and in North America on 10 September.

The digital copy of the retail release game spans 2.7GB, to match with the constraints of the PS Vita game card; on top of this, a post-release day one v1.01 patch adds another 1.2GB worth of contents to the game, bringing the total game size to 4GB at release. A patch released in October 2014 allowed compatibility with the PlayStation TV microconsole.

The online servers for the game were shut down on 12 August 2022.

=== Downloadable content ===
Downloadable content called "Botzone Soldier Training" was released on 26 April 2014. It makes it possible to play multiplayer offline against bots. Downloadable content called "LMG" was released on 15 April 2015.

=== Soundtrack ===
Killzone Mercenary Official Game Soundtrack

Soundtrack album by Walter Christian Mair
- Released: 4 September 2013
- Genres: Orchestral, video game soundtrack
- Length: 41:37

The soundtrack for Killzone: Mercenary is the first game in the series not to have Joris de Man as composer of the soundtrack, instead leaving Walter Christian Mair as composer. The soundtrack was released on 4 September 2013.

Track listing
No.	Title	Length
1.	"The Devastation of Vekta"	1:36
2.	"Justice For All"	3:52
3.	"Liberation"	2:04
4.	"Code of War"	1:16
5.	"Lightning Strike"	4:04
6.	"Diplomatic Incident"	1:56
7.	"The Package"	3:23
8.	"Lights Out"	5:16
9.	"Hostile Takeover"	6:28
10.	"Blood Money"	4:25
11.	"Exit Wounds"	5:17
12.	"War is our Business"	2:00
Total length:		41:37

== Reception ==
Reception

Aggregate score
Aggregator	Score
Metacritic	78/100

Review scores
Publication	Score
Edge	6/10
Eurogamer	8/10
Famitsu	34/40
IGN	8.0/10
Joystiq	3.5/5
PlayStation Official Magazine – UK	7/10
Push Square	8/10

Killzone: Mercenary received "generally positive reviews", according to review aggregator website Metacritic. It managed to highly exceed the first two PS Vita first-person shooters, Call of Duty: Black Ops: Declassified and Resistance: Burning Skies, which both received fairly negative reviews. The game sold 11,053 copies in Japan within the first week of release. IGN called it "the best portable shooter ever made". TheSixthAxis stated "there's no other experience like this on a device as small as this". It received the 1st Place 2013 PlayStation Vita Game of the Year Award.
