= Killzone 3 =

2011 video game

- Developer: Guerrilla Games
- Publisher: Sony Computer Entertainment
- Director: Mathijs de Jonge
- Composer: Joris de Man
- Series: Killzone
- Platform: PlayStation 3
- Release: NA: February 22, 2011; PAL: February 25, 2011
- Genre: First-person shooter
- Modes: Single-player, multiplayer

Killzone 3 is a 2011 first-person shooter video game for the PlayStation 3, developed by Guerrilla Games and published by Sony Computer Entertainment. It is the fourth installment in the Killzone series, the first game in the series to be presented in stereoscopic 3D, and the first to include motion controls using the PlayStation Move. It is a direct sequel to Killzone 2. It was released worldwide in February 2011 to positive reviews.

== Gameplay ==
A screenshot showing the new Arctic environments of the game

The gameplay strongly resembles that of Killzone 2 albeit with several tweaks and changes. Similar to the first Killzone, the game takes place in various harsh environments such as Arctic landscapes, a lethal alien jungle, nuclear wastelands as well as space battles rather than only the city-scape environments which were present in Killzone 2. Another notable new feature is the ability to use jet packs in the game, which were also used in Killzone: Liberation.

The game also features a revamped close combat melee system (called Brutal Melee) which includes new brutal melee attacks as well as the ability to string together multiple attacks in a combo. A new weapon called the WASP has also been added, which acts as a multi-firing rocket launcher firing in spiral formation.

=== Multiplayer ===
Online multiplayer of Killzone 3 supports three different game modes: Guerilla Warfare, Warzone, and Operations. "Guerilla Warfare" is a classic team death match style game that supports up to 16 players per map for each map that supports this mode. "Warzone", returning from Killzone 2's multiplayer, is an objective based game (seven objectives: "Body Count", "Capture and Hold", "Search and Retrieve", and two rounds of "Assassination" and "Search and Destroy" respectively) that supports up to 24 players per map for each map that supports this mode. What sets "Warzone" apart from other games in the genre is the way that each objective is used. Rather than having each game type be its own separate mode, the objectives cycle randomly during the course of gameplay without ever interrupting the match. Each game type comes up with a timer, and when the timer ends or the objective is completed the winning team is awarded that "round" and the match continues until all 7 rounds have been completed. Each warzone match is decided in a "best of 7" manner and since players continue to play and fight for control of strategic points on the map, there is a substantial continuous metagame of territory control present throughout every match. This is exemplified further by the addition of "Tactical Spawn Areas" in Killzone 3 (a change from the spawn grenades of Killzone 2) where certain spawn locations need to be fought over and are better for some of the objectives than they are for others so a teams tacticians must decide which ones are needed for the current objective, as well as weighing the possibility of what future objectives may come up and the risk involved with capturing and maintaining them.

"Operations" is a new game mode that features cinematic scenes and supports up to 16 players per map for each map that supports this mode. In Operations, the ISA and the Helghast battle for control of specific objectives – the ISA on the offensive and the Helghast on defense. The best players are featured throughout the match in cutscenes depicting their successes.

Killzone 3 also supports offline split-screen co-operation for two players, which allows two players using the same console to play the campaign of Killzone 3 offline. This is a feature not present in Killzone 2. This is the only mode that supports offline split-screen multiplayer in Killzone 3. There is also an offline multiplayer mode named 'BotZone' in which players can play against computer bots. There are a total of eight multiplayer maps on the disk.

A new feature to Killzone multiplayer for Killzone 3 is the ability to use vehicle-like mechanisms: the jet packs and Exos (each available on one game disc map respectively). The jet packs are exclusive to the Turbine Concourse SE-6 map while the Exos, as well as the WASP rocket launcher created by the Engineer, are only available on the Corinth Highway map. Another new feature is the ability to use Mortar Beacons, which can be used if a Tactician captures a tactical spawn point from which the Mortar Beacons are found. Mortar Beacons are featured on the Corinth Highway, Pyrrhus Crater, Bilgarsk Boulevard, Frozen Dam, and Mawlr Graveyard maps. Miniguns can be created by the Engineer on the Pyrrhus Crater, Bilgarsk Boulevard, and Turbine Concourse SE-6 maps. A snowstorm is featured on the Akmir Snowdrift map and a crusher (which the player can control) is featured in the Mawlr Graveyard.

There are a total of five classes for players to choose from: Marksman, Engineer, Field Medic, Tactician, and Infiltrator. Each class has his own special abilities and weapons, such as disguise for the Infiltrator or cloaking for the Marksman. Unlike Killzone 2, players may choose any class from the start, however, they must earn Unlock Points to upgrade the abilities and to gain more weapons for each class (Unlock Points are awarded by ranking up). Each class's abilities can be upgraded twice, and they can unlock two additional primary weapons, one or two additional secondary weapons, and/or one heavy weapon (e.g. rocket launcher) depending on class. Other abilities, such as armor or silent footsteps, are earned based on obtaining a certain rank in multiplayer and can be used on any class. Ribbons (e.g. Faster Reload, Faster Aim, Double XP, etc.) are earned in-game based upon a certain achievement required by the ribbon and only apply to that particular match and must be re-earned each match.

The points system has also been updated where one kill equals 100 points, as opposed to one kill equaling 1 point in Killzone 2. Other updates to the points system include Assist kills (25 points), destroying Bots (50 points), Explosive kills (150 points), objective based points (e.g. 600 points for completely assassinating the assassination target in Assassination), Double and Triple kills and kill streaks (3, 5, 10, etc.).

== Plot ==
In the climax of Killzone 2, Emperor Scolar Visari is assassinated by ISA forces, triggering a full-scale attack by the Helghan First Army. Overwhelmed, ISA commanders order a full withdrawal, leaving thousands of their own soldiers to die on Helghan. With the Helghast now driven to seek revenge for Visari's death, the survivors must join forces to find a way home.

=== Story ===
After failing to save Visari's life, Sgt. Tomas Sevchenko and Rico Velasquez regroup with Captain Jason Narville outside the imperial palace. With Helghan cruisers preparing to attack their fleet, they are forced to fight their way through the ruins of Pyrrhus, sacrificing most of their remaining armor and manpower in order to reach an extraction point near the edge of the city. Admiral Orlock, commander of the First Army, is pressured by Jorhan Stahl, the chairman of arms manufacturer Stahl Arms, to either ensure the total destruction of the ISA or turn over control of the army to him. Meanwhile, Rico receives a transmission from Jammer, a sniper whose platoon has been cut off by the Helghast. Against Narville's orders, he goes to assist them. The rest of the force attempts to link up with the fleet, but enemy interference leads to several ships being shot down, forcing the remainder to leave without Narville's men.

Six months later, Stahl calls for a vote in the Helghan Imperial Senate to remove Orlock for incompetence, but his request is denied. Furious, Stahl ends his company's cooperation with the First Army and organizes his personal guard to hunt down the ISA, who have set up a base in a remote jungle near one of their destroyed cruisers. While working to restore the base's communication uplink, the soldiers learn that the UCN has agreed to a ceasefire with the Helghast, effectively abandoning them. The transmission is intercepted by Stahl's men, who subsequently attack the camp and kill everyone aside from Tomas and Narville, who are taken captive.

Rico and Jammer's platoon, now calling themselves the Raiders, ambush the convoy and free Tomas. They carry out several attacks against Helghan facilities in the area, eventually reaching the main campus of Stahl Arms. Learning that Stahl plans to publicly execute Narville, Tomas and Rico don Helghast uniforms and rescue him and his fellow prisoners. Accessing the company's mainframe, they discover that Stahl has built his own armada armed with weapons powered by irradiated Petrusite, powerful enough to tear living organisms apart. Believing himself to be Visari's rightful successor, Stahl intends to win the favor of Helghan by conquering Earth itself.

Fed up with Stahl's arrogance, the senate grants Orlock the title of Autarch, giving him Visari's throne instead. Stahl is ordered to surrender his ships to the First Army's fleet above Helghan so they may be used to attack Earth. The ISA comes under attack from a massive Helghan assault mech, and though they manage to defeat it, their numbers are reduced to just 60 men. Nevertheless, they deactivate the perimeter defenses around Pyrrhus's spaceport, allowing them to access the imperial orbit command center.

Aware of Orlock's plans to murder him after securing his weapons, Stahl double-crosses and kills him before launching an attack on the First Army, giving the ISA a desperately needed opening to steal several Helghast transports. Stahl orders his flagship to warp to Earth, but Tomas manages to destroy its warp coil, causing the ship to plummet towards Helghan's surface. A direct nuclear strike ordered by Narville obliterates the vessel, causing it to drop its Petrusite arsenal on Helghan. The resulting fallout destroys what remains of the Helghast, leading Tomas to comment on how many innocent lives must have perished as a result of their actions. With the war over, the last of the ISA returns to Vekta.

Around the same time, two Helghast soldiers recover an escape pod from Stahl's ship. Though the occupant's identity is not revealed, it is implied that Stahl is still alive, which is confirmed by the sequel.

== Development ==
The game was unveiled by Sony Computer Entertainment on May 24, 2010, through the PlayStation.Blog. The game was leaked on May 21 through an early release copy of the June issue of gaming magazine GamePro alongside a leaked screenshot. Rumors about a new entry in the Killzone series have been around shortly after the release of Killzone 2. On March 20, 2010, Sony confirmed that they were working on Killzone 3. President of Sony Computer Entertainment America, Jack Tretton, confirmed its development in an interview with GameTrailers, but at that point of time could not yet say when the game would be announced.

Guerrilla's managing director, Herman Hulst, has stated Killzone 3 would use close to 100% of the PlayStation 3's power. The rumors of the intervention of Naughty Dog in the development were denied by Guerrilla: "Guerrilla is working on Killzone 3's graphics engine all on its own, confirming Naughty Dog has no hand in its development". The first teaser trailer for the game was released on June 3 and features the new brutal melee combat system. The cinematic trailer shows Sev battling a Helghast ending with him taking the Helghast's helmet and putting it on himself. The single player demo reveals that this is part of the game as Sev and Rico dress as Helghast to infiltrate a Helghast facility at Stahl Arms.

On June 11, on Killzone.com and the U.S. PlayStation Blog, Guerrilla Games released a pre-E3 gameplay video. Guerrilla said the gameplay video is made of gameplay footage from the game's fourth mission called "Frozen Shores". At E3 2010, it was confirmed that Killzone 3 would support the PlayStation Move and would be released in February 2011. A pre-alpha code gameplay video was also shown at E3 in 3D; a special screen was lowered and the audience had 3D glasses available to them. The E3 gameplay video featured the jet packs as well as the player riding on a craft using a turret.

Guerrilla Games game director, Mathijs de Jonge, has been chatting about the merits of swearing in games, and with Killzone 3 he feels the studio have got just the right amount. "In Killzone 2 we ended up with too much of it, Killzone 3 swearing 'a lot more impactful'." he told Edge. Tommy de Roos, principal programmer at Guerrilla Games, who headed development for Move with Killzone 3, has said that he thinks "Most [first-person shooter] games will be played with motion control in a few years."

Killzone 3 takes up a full dual-layer Blu-ray disc. This is due to the duplication of level texture files for faster disc streaming and also the presence of video files in multiple languages.

According to Guerrilla Games, Killzone 3's story is more light-hearted compared to its predecessor, which Guerrilla felt suffered from an overly serious and dark story which was one of the major complaints of the original, though they mentioned that it would not be too light-hearted as it is still a war. In addition, Guerrilla Games hired an external writer to focus on only writing the storyline so as to give a fresh perspective to the story as well as hiring a lot more Hollywood actors to elevate the level of storytelling within the dialogue of the game (such as Malcolm McDowell voicing Jorhan Stahl and Ray Winstone voicing Admiral Orlock).

Guerrilla Games stated that the game's story would be an integral part of the game with dialogue and character development being greatly improved from its predecessor. In addition, Guerrilla Games stated that they are curtailing the swearing in Killzone 3, which many felt was unnecessary in the dialogue of Killzone 2. They mentioned that the dialogue in the game should be focused on advancing the story rather than "gratuitous" swearing.

=== Beta ===
The Killzone 3 Multiplayer Closed Beta began on October 12, 2010, for select participants of the Killzone community. The Killzone 3 Multiplayer Open Beta began on October 25, 2010. A limited 5,000 PlayStation Plus subscribers from SCEA and 10,000 PlayStation Plus subscribers from SCEE could gain access to the beta by downloading the Killzone 3 XMB theme (released on October 13 and 19, 2010 for SCEE and SCEA respectively). Selected participants were notified by email with a redeem code to access the beta. This beta was to test gameplay only and did not support PlayStation Move or 3D capabilities.

The Twitter page for Killzone selected 300 Twitter subscribers (150 from SCEE and SCEA territories respectively) to participate in the open beta between October 19 and 22, 2010. On November 7, 2010, the beta was expanded inviting 5,000 more PlayStation Plus subscribers from SCEE and SCEA territories. Instead of email distribution, these redeem codes were sent out via PlayStation Network messages. This beta ended prior to the end of 2010.

On January 21, 2011, it was announced that the Killzone 3 Multiplayer Open Beta will be available for download on the PlayStation Network on February 2 in North America and February 3 in Europe through February 14, 2011. On February 1, however, it was announced that the North American open beta was delayed until February 3 and "to make it up", Sony ran a sweepstakes to giveaway 60 Killzone 3 Limited Helghast Editions (not sold in stores) to U.S. players who participated in the open beta from February 4 through February 6. The Beta offered early access to the 'Frozen Dam' multiplayer level, including all three online multiplayer modes – Guerrilla Warfare, Warzone and Operations – as well as the offline multiplayer mode, Botzone.

On February 9, 2011, it was reported that over 58 million kills have been made, 10% of that being Brutal Melee kills, with 350,000 games already played.

Due to the high response of the first Killzone 3 Limited Helghast Edition sweepstakes giveaway, Sony ran another sweepstakes, giving away 60 more Limited Helghast Editions from February 11 through February 13, 2011, in the U.S., with five Canadian participants also chosen.

=== Demo ===
The Killzone 3 single player demo was released in North America on February 15 and in Europe on February 16, 2011 (with early access for PlayStation Plus members on February 8 and 9 in North America and Europe respectively). It is available as two separate downloads from the PlayStation Store: one in 2D and one in 3D. The 2D version features splitscreen co-op, which is not supported in the 3D demo. Both versions of the demo are PlayStation Move-enabled and both versions of the demo take place on a modified version of the "Icy Incursion" level.

=== 3D support ===
Killzone 3 includes a mode that supports 3D gaming. The Killzone 3 3D mode is optional and requires a 3D ready TV The first impressions of the 3D showed some glitches; with three-dimensional visual effects, the game became blurry, imprecise, and disorienting. In alpha version, 3D sacrificed things like sharpness, speed, a feeling of orientation and a lot more aliasing. Jagged edges as well as some ghosting of interface elements are reported to occur.

At E3 2010, it was revealed that Killzone 3 was built with 3D support from the ground up. In praise of the game's 3D capabilities, GameTrailers awarded the title Best 3D Graphics of E3 2010, although officially, it did not have any nominations at E3 2010. The E3 2010 trailer resolution is half the horizontal resolution of the 2D game, with the whole image (including HUD) scaled up using the PlayStation 3 hardware scaler and render the vision of a single eye.

== Release and marketing ==
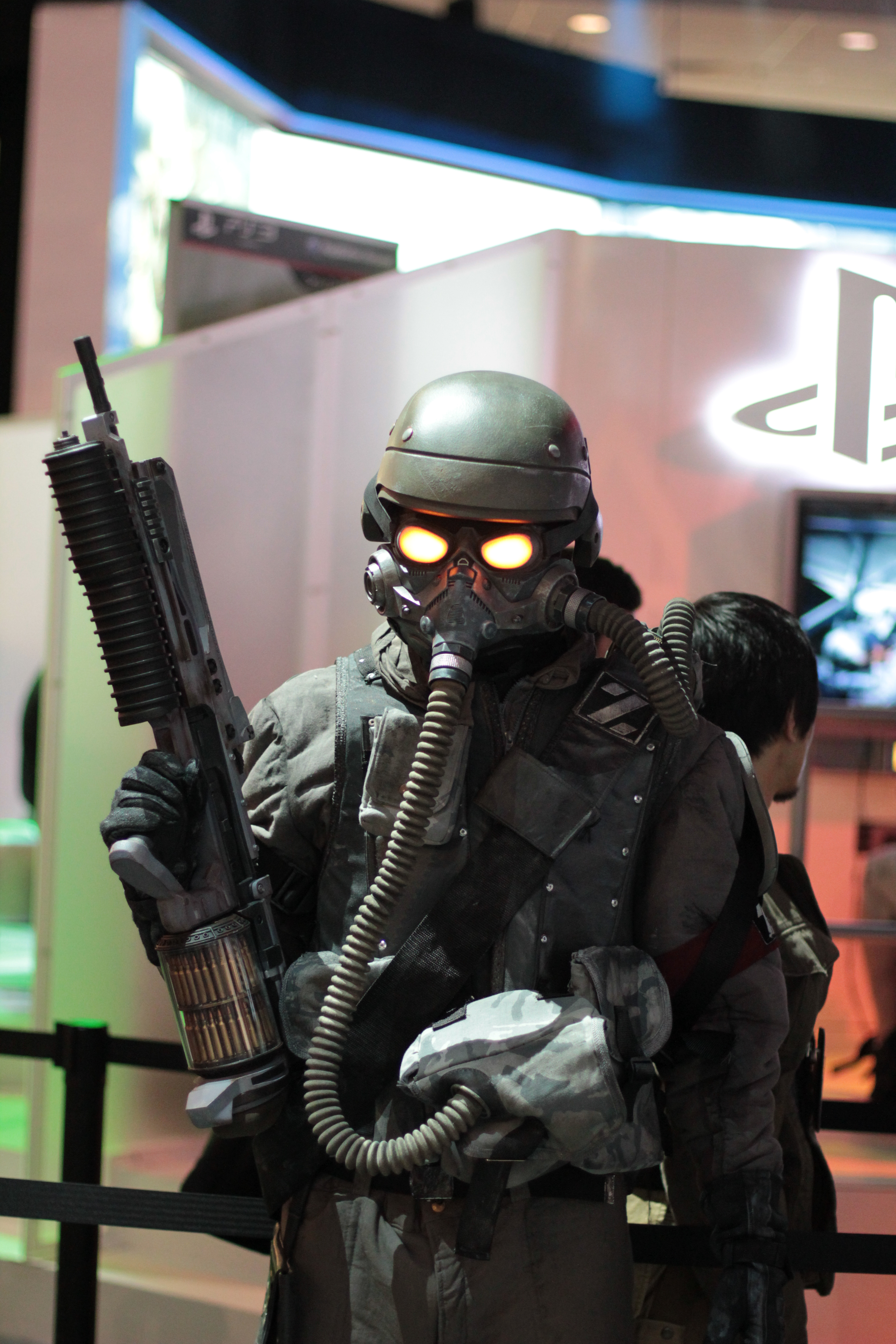
Promotion at E3 2010

Killzone 3 was released on February 22, 2011, in North America, February 23 in Europe, and February 25 in the United Kingdom. 7-Eleven offered downloadable content for Killzone 3 in exchange for Slurpee purchases in stores in the U.S. which ran from February 2011 to the end of March 2011. 7-Eleven also featured Killzone 3 themed Slurpee cups, in addition to a Killzone flavor, "Battle Fuel" (a chilling orange flavor). Each Slurpee cup bore a unique code, allowing a download for Killzone 3 content (and other Slurpee rewards), such as content for PlayStation Home (the Helghast "Capture Trooper" and "Jason Narville I.S.A." costumes and a "Slurpee Machine"), the Retro Map Pack, the "Unlock and Load Pack", two PS3 XMB Themes (standard and Dynamic), a PC wallpaper, and a behind-the-scenes video.

Early copies of Killzone 3 (including both the standalone and Helghast Editions) included a redeemable voucher for the multiplayer beta of SOCOM 4: U.S. Navy SEALs.

Walmart hosted a midnight launch event. The first 20 players who purchased Killzone 3 received a limited edition Killzone 3 poster and a voucher for the Retro Map Pack. Select Walmart stores also hosted tournaments where players could win a copy of Killzone 3, a limited edition Cloaking Helghast Marksman action figure, and collectible Killzone 3 bags. GameStop also had a midnight launch event.

A limited edition Killzone 3 PlayStation 3 bundle was released on February 22, 2011, in North America, which includes a 160GB PlayStation 3 and a copy of Killzone 3.

On February 28, 2012, to celebrate Killzone 3's one-year anniversary, Guerrilla Games released a standalone version of Killzone 3's multiplayer on the PlayStation Store titled Killzone 3 Multiplayer. It includes the Guerrilla Warfare, Warzone, and Operations game modes, as well as the original Killzone 3 maps and all Killzone 3 DLC maps. Users can also try it for free until they reached the rank of Sergeant I. Players who purchase Killzone 3 Multiplayer are also granted a 24-hour double XP bonus, three unlock points, the ability to set up clans and custom games, and access to the Botzone mode, as well as the addition of four exclusive trophies.

Players can purchase a standalone version of Killzone 3's multiplayer from the PlayStation Store which includes all online multiplayer game modes, all original maps, and all DLC maps, as well as BotZone.

The online servers for the game were closed down on March 29, 2018.

=== Retail editions ===
Alongside the standard edition of the game, there are several other versions of the game exclusive to certain countries and/or regions around the world. All of the special edition versions of the game are sold in limited quantities and contain a copy of the game as standard or special packaging.

The Helghast Edition was released in North America, Europe and Australia. The Helghast Edition for North America comes with a "Helghast Helmet" replica, which contains an art book, a copy of Killzone 3, and the Super Voucher in the Killzone 3 game case, and a "Cloaking Helghast Marksman" action figure (6.5" tall with multiple articulation points and will not be sold at retail; created by DC Unlimited). The art book is a 100-page hardbound art book featuring imagery from the Killzone universe. The Helghast Edition for Europe and Australia includes all of the content of the North American version, however, the Super Voucher is replaced with the PSN Voucher and the copy of Killzone 3 is in a SteelBook Collector's Edition case.

Both the Super Voucher and the PSN Voucher include all of the same content. Both vouchers include the Killzone 3 soundtrack, Killzone 3 Behind the Scenes (bonus video content giving a look at the making of the game), an exclusive PS3 dynamic theme, the "Retro Map Pack: Reclaimed Territory", double XP for the first 24 hours of multiplayer gameplay, and full access to all weapons and abilities during the first 24 hours of multiplayer gameplay (the 24 hours begins upon redemption of voucher and counts down regardless of player being online or offline).

The Collector's Edition was released in Europe and Australia. The Collector's Edition of Killzone 3 came in a SteelBook case packaging, which is also included in the Killzone 3 Helghast Edition for Europe and Australia. The limited Collector's Edition was available only through pre-order. It included a PSN voucher code to access the Retro Map Pack, a Killzone 3 dynamic theme, and the Killzone 3 soundtrack. It also included another PSN voucher as a pre-order bonus, which either unlocked all weapons and abilities, gave double XP (both for first 24 hours of multiplayer gameplay), or 3 Unlock Points to use on any weapon or ability.

In the Netherlands, players could purchase the Collector's Edition for the price of the standard edition if they pre-ordered from Game Mania stores.

==== Limited edition ====
The Killzone 3 Limited Helghast Edition was not sold in stores and was available in North America. 450 have been made, 125 of which were given away in the multiplayer open beta from February 4 through February 6 and 11 through February 13, 2011. The Limited Helghast Edition contains all the same elements as the retail version of the Helghast Edition, but features a replica Helghast Helmet with illuminated LED eyes, simulating Helghasts' glowing mask.

On March 10, 2011, ACIDplanet.com announced a sweepstakes that ran from March 10, 2011, through April 21, 2011. In this "Killzone 3 Remix Contest", players could remix the track "Stahl Arms Battle" from the Killzone 3 soundtrack. At the end of the contest, Joris de Man chose one grand prize winner who received the Killzone 3 Limited Helghast Edition as well as Vegas Pro software, ACID Pro software, Twenty Loop Libraries, and a Sony MP3 Walkman. Second place runners-up received a copy of Killzone 3, ACID Music Studio software, and Ten Loop Libraries. The grand prize was won by composer/producer Christopher K. Lee under the username Blizzard1mage.

On March 24, 2011, Guerilla announced the "March for Helghan II Sweepstakes" where they gave away 10 Limited Helghast Editions each day (170 total) from March 25 through April 10. Players needed to play the Killzone 3 multiplayer for a chance to win.

=== Pre-order bonuses ===
The download packs contained in the Super Voucher (excluding the soundtrack) were also available as pre-order bonuses for the Standard Edition of Killzone 3 from select retailers in North America. Europe and Australia did not receive pre-order bonuses from select retailers, but instead, they have the Collector's Edition which contains the pre-order bonus content of North America.

GameStop offered the "Guerilla Pack" which contained a voucher unlocking all multiplayer weapons and abilities for the first 24 hours of multiplayer gameplay. Best Buy offered the "Fast Starter Pack" which contained a voucher allowing players to rank up faster as they earn double XP for the first 24 hours of multiplayer gameplay. Amazon.com offered the "Unlock and Load Pack" which contained a voucher allowing instant access to 3 Unlock Points to use on the weapon or ability of the players choice. If players pre-ordered Killzone 3 from Amazon.com via PlayStation Home, they also received an "Helghast Jetpack" for their Home avatar in addition to the "Unlock and Load Pack". GameStop, Best Buy, and Amazon.com each offered the Retro Map Pack with their respective pre-order bonus. Other participating retailers offered the Retro Map Pack and the Killzone 3 PS3 Dynamic Theme.

=== PlayStation Home ===
From January 27, 2011, until February 24, 2011, in the PlayStation 3's social gaming network PlayStation Home, the "Central Plaza" (North American Home's central meeting point) was redesigned as "the last remaining ISA stronghold" in celebration of Killzone 3 (European users could also access the Central Plaza; a special ISA Dropship was available in the Home Square, Europe's central meeting point, that teleported users to the Central Plaza). There was a mini-game in the Central Plaza called "Killzone Plaza Defender" which was a Killzone-themed first-person shooter mini-game where players shoot down enemy Helghast airships, ground vehicles, and infantry units or assist gunners by collecting and delivering ammunition, repair kits, and first aid. The mini-game had three waves for users to complete, each with three challenges (such as completing each wave, assisting other players in each wave, completing Wave 1 with full health, completing Wave 2 with a certain accuracy, and completing Wave 3 with a perfect score) with an unlockable ISA uniform (Rico's uniform, plus a helmet) for the users Home avatar. Completing all of the challenges for all three waves granted three Unlock Points, which could be redeemed for new weapons and abilities in the Killzone 3 multiplayer. Users could also pre-order Killzone 3 from Amazon.com at a special kiosk in the Central Plaza (or from the "Killzone Plaza Defender"'s menu screen). Pre-ordering by this means granted users an "Helghast Jetpack" for their Home avatar in addition to the other pre-order bonus from Amazon.com (pre-order was unavailable for European users). In addition, users could also obtain a "Helghast Capture Trooper" and "Jason Narville I.S.A." costume for their Home avatar as well as a Slurpee Machine for their personal spaces from the 7-Eleven promotion for 2 Slurpee points each.

=== Other ===
In the PlayStation 3 game LittleBigPlanet 2, a "Killzone 3 Minipack" was released as DLC on July 12, 2011. This pack includes costumes for players to dress their Sackboy like a Killzone 3 character.

On November 15, 2011, in the PlayStation 3 game Uncharted 3: Drake's Deception, a DLC pack was released titled "Multiplayer Accessory Pack #1 (Killzone)" which includes the "Capture Trooper Skin", a "Helghast Helmet" and an "ISA Helmet", which can also be purchased individually (free for "Fortune Hunter's Club" members).

== Downloadable content ==
The first downloadable content (DLC) for Killzone 3 is the "Retro Map Pack: Reclaimed Territory" which consists of two of the most popular maps from Killzone 2. The maps are the "Salamun Market" and "Blood Gracht" maps, which have been updated for Killzone 3. "Saluman Market" features the Warzone game mode (as well as Exos and placements for the WASP to be constructed by the Engineer) while "Blood Gracht" features the Guerilla Warfare game mode. This pack was made available to purchase from the PlayStation Network on February 22, 2011. The map pack was also available as a pre-order bonus from various retailers and could be obtained from 7-Eleven's promotion of Killzone 3 for 10 Slurpee rewards points. It was also included in the Helghast Edition. The map pack includes seven trophies; two map specific trophies for each map respectively, and three non-map specific trophies. Edge and Schick are offering specially packaged shaving gel and razors for three PS3 exclusives; Gran Turismo 5, Infamous 2, and Killzone 3. The special Killzone 3 packages include a redeemable voucher for the Retro Map Pack or three Unlock Points.

On February 24, 2011, the second DLC map pack, "Steel Rain", was announced. Steel Rain features the maps "Junkyard" and "Stahl Arms" which feature the game modes Guerilla Warfare and Warzone respectively. "Junkyard" also features both the Exos and Jetpacks and "Stahl Arms" features a placement for a minigun to be constructed by the Engineer. Steel Rain was released in Europe on April 6, 2011, and in North America on April 12, 2011 (free for PlayStation Plus subscribers). This map pack includes seven trophies: two map specific trophies for each map respectively, and three non-map specific trophies.

A third map pack, titled "From the Ashes", was announced on June 17, 2011, and includes four maps: two new maps and two retro maps. "Lente Missile Base" is a Warzone map that features a missile launch environmental hazard, similar to the nuclear explosion from the Killzone 2 DLC map "Southern Hills" (any players caught in the underground exhaust vents will be killed by the missile's engine blast). "Mobile Factory" is a Guerilla Warfare map set on the mobile factory from the campaign with scrap metal shredders below the base (killing players who step off of this moving map, similar to the "Wasteland Bullet" DLC map from Killzone 2), and also features two portable miniguns. From the Ashes also features "Radec Academy" (a Warzone map featuring two constructible miniguns and a destructive environmental hazard) and "Tharsis Depot" (a Guerilla Warfare map featuring jet packs) from Killzone 2, and was released on June 21, 2011, for US$4.99. This map pack includes thirteen trophies: two map specific trophies for each map respectively and five non-map specific trophies.

Simultaneously announced and released with the third DLC map pack is the "Killzone 3 Map Pack Bundle" featuring all three DLC map packs ("Retro Map Pack: Reclaimed Territory", "Steel Rain", and "From the Ashes") for US$9.99. A "Triple-XP Weekend" (points gained are tripled at the end of the match) was hosted the weekend of June 24–27 to celebrate the release of "From the Ashes" and the "Map Pack Bundle". There have also been three "Double-XP Weekends" (points gained are doubled at the end of the match). The first two "Double-XP Weekends" were for the return of PSN from the PSN outage – the first for Europe and North America's return and the second for Japan's return – and the third was for Killzone 3's one-year anniversary.

== Soundtrack ==
Like Killzone 2, the soundtrack for Killzone 3 was composed by Joris de Man. It was released both as downloadable content via the Killzone 3 Helghast Edition and Collector's Edition (SCEE territories), and as a stand-alone digital release, on February 22, 2011. Later, it was released to purchase on the PlayStation Network on March 8, 2011.

== Novel ==
A novelization of Killzone 3, titled Killzone: Ascendancy and written by Sam Bradbury, is available from Penguin Books in paperback format and from Amazon.com in Kindle format. According to the PlayStation.Blog post, "the author delved deep into the game's story to answer... questions" about the game, such as what drives Sev and Rico's actions.

== Reception ==
Reception

Aggregate score
Aggregator	Score
Metacritic	84/100

Review scores
Publication	Score
1Up.com	B+
Edge	7/10
Eurogamer	8/10
Game Informer	9/10
GameSpot	8.5/10
GameTrailers	9.4/10
IGN	8.5/10
PlayStation Official Magazine – UK	9/10
PlayStation: The Official Magazine	10/10
X-Play	4/5

Killzone 3 received "generally positive reviews", according to review aggregator website Metacritic. The first English review of the game was published by PlayStation Official Magazine – UK, which gave the game a 9/10. The review stated "on a visual level, as a 3D breakthrough, this feels like a watershed moment in a revolution affecting all of gaming". The review also stated on gameplay terms, "Black Ops is the only [first-person shooter] on PlayStation 3 that can match this". The voice acting, however, was criticised as not being perfect, thus lacking "emotive punch" and the reason for not receiving a perfect 10/10.

IGN gave the game an 8.5, praising the atmosphere, graphics and multiplayer. Destructoid gave the game a perfect 10/10, with reviewer James Stephanie Sterling stating: "I don't think the PlayStation 3 has ever had quite such a rounded, satisfactory package as this, with this level of polish, refinement and pure, simple, unpretentious action". PlayStation Lifestyle awarded it a 10/10 as well, calling the game "the ultimate ending to a new form of sci-fi epic".

GamesTM was generally positive and gave the game 7/10, although was critical over the storyline and when comparing it to Killzone 2 said the game "takes inexplicable backward steps in almost every department". Game Informer, who scored the game a 9/10, however, praised the story saying "[Killzone 3's] shocking and abrupt campaign ending serves as a suitable wrap to Guerilla's extended war-themed trilogy. Even if it is a conclusion of sorts, Killzone 3 stands on its own." They also praised its intuitive use of the PlayStation Move as an optional controller.

== Sequel ==
Before Killzone 3's release, Guerrilla Games already had a "lot of ideas" for the next installment. In an interview with PlayStation Official Magazine – UK (UK), Mathijs de Jonge said: "We're looking at new projects, there's a lot of ideas already floating around the company to put in a new Killzone." On November 18, 2011, Edge reported that Guerrilla Games is making a new Killzone game. Killzone 2 and 3 senior producer Steven Ter Heide is reportedly game director. Guerrilla studio recruiter Adrian Smith is quoted as saying "we've got to continue the Killzone franchise." Earlier in the week Edge reported that one of Sony's studios had stopped PlayStation 3 development and moved onto its successor. The unnamed developer is also apparently involved in building the graphics technology for Sony's next system. Alongside Killzone, the studio is also working on a new IP, Edge reported, led by former Killzone game director Mathijs de Jonge. On February 20, 2013, a sequel, Killzone: Shadow Fall, was shown at the PlayStation Meeting 2013, announcing the PlayStation 4 with Shadow Fall as a launch title.
