= Nothing Else =

Nothing Else may refer to:

- Nothing Else (album), a studio album by Lorn
- "Nothing Else" (Cody Carnes song), 2019
- "Nothing Else!", a song by Mura Masa from the album Mura Masa
- "Nothing Else", a song by Archive from the album Londinium
- "Nothing Else", a song by Angus & Julia Stone from the album Snow
- Nothing Else (Forrest Frank and Thomas Rhett song), 2025
