= Killzone: Liberation =

2006 video game

- European cover art
- Developer: Guerrilla Games (Note: Housemarque assisted on development.)
- Publisher: Sony Computer Entertainment
- Director: Mathijs de Jonge
- Series: Killzone
- Platform: PlayStation Portable
- Release: NA: 31 October 2006; EU: 3 November 2006; AU: 8 November 2006
- Genre: Shooter
- Modes: Single-player, multiplayer

Killzone: Liberation is a 2006 shooter video game played from an isometric perspective. It was developed by Guerrilla Games and published by Sony Computer Entertainment for the PlayStation Portable. It is a spin-off of the Killzone series and the follow-up to Killzone, taking place two months after the original game. Killzone: Liberation is the only installment in the series to be released on the PlayStation Portable. An emulated version of the game was released on 20 June 2023 for the PlayStation 4 and PlayStation 5.

In Killzone: Liberation, players control Templar, a soldier in the ISA (Interplanetary Strategic Alliance) who was the primary protagonist of the previous game, Killzone. Throughout the game, players battle against the Helghast, a group of genetically enhanced soldiers. The game features a single-player campaign that follows Templar as he tries to rescue hostages and gather intelligence on the Helghast. It also includes a multiplayer mode in which players can compete against each other in various game modes.

Killzone: Liberation is known for its strong graphics and gameplay, which build upon the foundations of the original Killzone game. It received generally positive reviews upon release, with many praising its solid controls and engaging story.

== Gameplay ==
This game features a top-down isometric view in contrast to the original Killzone for the PlayStation 2 (PS2), which is a first-person shooter. The resultant game can be seen as a mixture of a shooter and a dungeon crawler.

The player controls Jan Templar, who was the primary protagonist of the original game. He can board and control several vehicles: heavy machine gun turrets, a tank, a hovercraft, and a jetpack. During some levels, a 'buddy' can be ordered around (although some are unarmed). These 'buddies' are normally teammates (Rico and Luger) or people that have to be rescued (the three VIP's in the third mission of the first chapter and Evelyn in the third mission of the fourth chapter).

By collecting various pickups in the form of money cases, the player unlocks new weapons. These can be found in various weapon caches in certain levels. After enough money is amassed, the V2 upgraded weapons become available. The weapons in the caches are converted into the V2 upgraded versions.

The player can unlock upgrades to Templar's abilities by completing challenges within certain limits (such as shooting X number of targets without shooting the 'civilian' targets). These are ranked in bronze, silver, and gold. Upgrades come in the form of carrying more items, hitting harder in close quarters combat, performing actions faster, unlimited ammunition, or upgraded health.

=== Multiplayer ===
Infrastructure online multiplayer servers have been shut down since the game's release, though it was widely praised by critics and players. Before servers were shut down, players could play via ad-hoc. Players could choose a team (between ISA and Helghast) and also choose a character in the multiplayer menu. There were a variety of game modes, including Deathmatch (a free-for-all game mode with no teams), Team Deathmatch (where teams kill one another), Deathmatch Duel (where a slightly smaller portion of the map is cut off by barbed wire so players have a smaller area to maneuver in), Capture the Flag (where teams try to get the enemy flag and bring it back to their flag), and Assault (where the Helghast team has to plant 3 charges of C4 around an ISA beacon and the ISA have to try and stop them). Deathmatch Duel was only available after downloading the chapter five mission. Infrastructure was only made available for download as DLC, and was not initially available for "out of the box play." The game also featured headset compatibility for online play.

== Plot ==
There are five chapters with 4 levels in which players eliminate the Helghast resistance (the fifth and final chapter was made available to download).

In Killzone: Liberation, two months after the events of Killzone, the Helghast have been dealt a hefty blow from the last game, but the war is far from over. The enemy still controls large parts of the planet Vekta, and though the ISA armies are fighting hard, they are losing ground. The rules of war have been cast aside with the sadistic Helghast General Armin Metrac, employed by the Helghast Emperor Scolar Visari to use brutal measures in order to seize the initiative after their past defeat and strengthen his position further. Metrac and his right-hand man, Colonel Cobar, are planning to capture three key figures of ISA, and their plan ends up successful.

Returning as Jan Templar, players are sent on a covert operation to save hostages captured by Metrac, while ISA troops continue the fight for liberty. Rico Velasquez, Templar's friend on the battlefield, often assists him on his way through the enemy lines. Shadow Marshall Luger, another of Templar's partners, also helps him.

As Metrac captures ISA minister of war Heff Milcher, scientist Evelyn Batton, and ISA general Dwight Stratson, Templar is sent on the rescue mission. After a set of military operations, Templar is closely following the trail of hostages and pursues Cobar, who has taken Milcher and Stratson. Milcher is then killed by Cobar, but Templar is nevertheless successful in defeating him, even though Cobar was piloting a personal walking tank. Cobar reveals that there is a traitor in ISA command who is helping the Helghast, but is finished off by Stratson before he can say who the traitor is.

The next step for Templar is to assault Metrac's mountain fortress and rescue Batton. Luger aids him on the mission. There, he fights many of Helghan's elite warriors (including a giant cybernetic unit) before encountering and killing Metrac in a final showdown. Afterwards, Templar locates Evelyn and escapes with her just before the fortress is destroyed. The game's outro marks the beginning of Killzone 2, as players hear Visari speaking of nuclear weapons which he intends to use on ISA forces.

In the fifth downloadable chapter, Templar is sent on a mission to the former Vektan capital of Sedah. Even though Metrac is no more, the enemy forces are still coordinated and fighting well. ISA believes that the unknown traitor is supplying Helghan with information. The only suspect is Rico, Templar's friend. Battling his way through the war-ravaged city, Templar finally finds Rico, who reveals that the traitor is, in fact, Stratson, who not only sold the planet to Helghast, but has become the shadow commander of the remaining Helghan forces. Templar proceeds to the Royal Palace of Vekta, where Stratson is located, battling hordes of Helghast and even Stratson's personal elite guard on his way. There, he engages the general in combat. However, Stratson is well-prepared and uses his armored mecha against Templar, but is ultimately defeated. A wounded Stratson is then arrested by ISA forces.

== Development ==
Housemarque provided coding support for the game.

== Release ==
The game was originally intended to have downloadable content (DLC) on its release day, but due to technical difficulties, the downloads promised were initially undelivered. On 30 May 2007, the free downloadable upgrade was released. The upgrade included two additions:

- Online multiplayer support including two new multiplayer maps and a new multiplayer game mode.
- Chapter 5 of the single-player campaign which concludes the game storyline.

As of 2011, the two DLC files were no longer available from the Killzone website. In June 2011, because of the "Welcome Back Program", Guerrilla republished the DLC for the US and EU versions.

On 20 June 2023, an updated version of Liberation was made available to purchase from the PlayStation Store and play on both the PlayStation 4 and PlayStation 5 consoles. The updated version is enhanced with up-rendering, rewind, quick save, and custom video filters, and includes trophy support and the DLC. Additionally, the game was added to the PlayStation Plus "Classics" catalog for Premium tier subscribers, who can download the game at no extra cost.

== Reception ==
Reception

Aggregate score
Aggregator	Score
Metacritic	77/100

Review scores
Publication	Score
Edge	7/10
Electronic Gaming Monthly	5.67/10
Eurogamer	7/10
Game Informer	7.25/10
GamePro	3.75/5
GameRevolution	C+
GameSpot	8.3/10
GameSpy	4/5
GameTrailers	8.5/10
GameZone	8.1/10
IGN	9/10
Official U.S. PlayStation Magazine	7.5/10
Detroit Free Press	3/4
The Sydney Morning Herald	4/5

The game received "generally favorable reviews" according to the review aggregation website Metacritic.

411Mania gave it a score of eight out of ten and called it "a game that provides a great deal of intense shooting action, with tough enemy opponents that don't lie down and die easily. While the challenge does mean you're going to die an awful lot, you won't have to backtrack much. Throw in an ad hoc competitive multiplayer component and co-op play for the whole campaign, and you've got a thoroughly excellent package." The Sydney Morning Herald gave it a similar score of four stars out of five and called it "A smart and challenging blend of action and strategy that is a welcome addition to the PSP's growing arsenal of titles." Detroit Free Press gave it three stars out of four and stated: "The biggest flaw? The single-player game is too short. And there's no online mode. But if you can find a friend with the game, the multiplayer maps make for explosive fun."

The game also received IGN's award for Best PSP Offline Multiplayer Game of 2006. In 2018 GamesRadar+ ranked it the 24th best PSP game of all time.
