= Shawn Layden =

American businessman

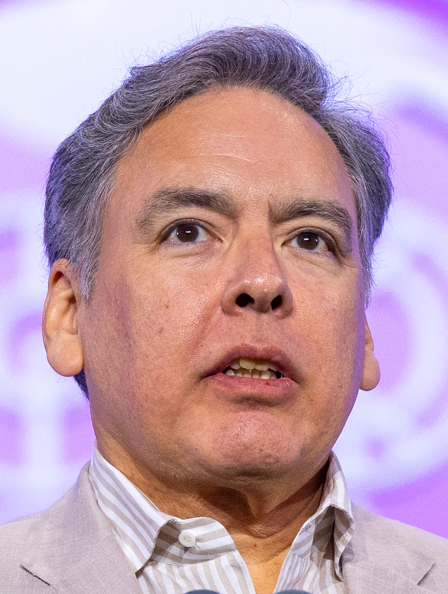
- Layden in 2026
- Born: June 25, 1961 (age 65)
- Education: University of Notre Dame
- Title: Producer, Sony Computer Entertainment Inc (1996–1999); Vice President, Sony Computer Entertainment Europe (1999–2007); President, Sony Computer Entertainment Japan (2007–2010); Vice President and COO, Sony Network Entertainment (2010–2014); President and CEO, Sony Interactive Entertainment America (2014–2018); Chairman, SIE Worldwide Studios (2016–2019)

Shawn Layden (born June 25, 1961) is an American businessman. Previously, he was chairman of SIE Worldwide Studios, president and CEO of Sony Interactive Entertainment America (SIEA), and executive vice president and COO of Sony Network Entertainment International (SNEI).

== Career ==
Layden joined Sony's corporate communications department in 1987 in Tokyo, Japan, and was the communications assistant for Sony co-founder Akio Morita for several years. Layden managed international software development at Sony Computer Entertainment's London Studio until 1999, when he became vice president of Sony Computer Entertainment Europe. After working almost nine years he became president of Sony Computer Entertainment Japan in October 2007, a position which he held until March 2010. In 2010, he was one of the founding members of Sony Network Entertainment International, and an executive vice president and COO.

In April 2014, Layden succeeded Jack Tretton as president and CEO of SCEA after Tretton stepped down from the position the previous month following a mutual agreement between Tretton and SCEA not to renew Tretton's contract. Following his appointment as president, Layden participated in Sony's conferences at E3 from 2014 to 2018.

In March 2018, Layden's role shifted to focus solely on Worldwide Studios, to "provide platform-defining content that helps drive the growth of SIE."

Sony announced on September 30, 2019, that Layden was stepping down as chairman of SIE Worldwide Studios. Journalists at the time believed this may have been due to a result of an internal power struggle with SIE president Jim Ryan over the further restructuring and globalization of SIE, However, in September 2021, Layden stated he retired due to exhaustion, believing the launch of the PlayStation 5 was a "good time to put the pin in my legacy."

Layden announced in September 2022 that he had joined Tencent Games as a strategic advisor. He has since concluded that relationship as of May 2024.

== Personal ==
Layden graduated from the University of Notre Dame in 1983 with a Bachelor of Arts in American Studies. He is proficient in Japanese.
