= Lorn (musician) =

American electronic musician

- Born: Marcos Ortega
- Genres: IDM; experimental; dark ambient; industrial; glitch; darksynth
- Occupation: Producer
- Instruments: Vocals; synthesizer; cello; guitar
- Years active: 2006–present
- Labels: Brainfeeder; Ninja Tune; Wednesday Sound
- Website: www.lorn.ws

Marcos Ortega, better known by his stage name Lorn, is an American electronic musician.

== Biography ==
Born in Normal, Illinois, Ortega grew up in central Illinois towns and eventually moved to Chicago, where he listened to electronic artists on the radio station WNUR as a teenager. Since Lorn's first release in 2006, his music was played in the UK by Mary Anne Hobbs on BBC Radio and subsequently XFM, and he has performed guest mixes several times for her radio shows. Lorn was invited to create a track for the soundtrack of Darren Aronofsky's 2010 film Black Swan, which Mary Anne Hobbs was working on, however the track was not used.

Lorn signed with Flying Lotus' label Brainfeeder in 2009, and released his debut album Nothing Else in June 2010, which was mastered by electronic artist Clark. He also received exposure in 2010 with his remix of grime musician Jammer's track "Better Than". He lived in New York City for a short time, and by 2010 had moved to Milwaukee, Wisconsin.

He released his second album, Ask The Dust (named after the 1939 novel by John Fante), on Ninja Tune in 2012. He produced an OST for the video game Killzone: Shadow Fall, which was released in 2014 also on Ninja Tune. Since 2014, he has released five albums, Vessel, A/D, Remnant, Rarities and Drown the Traitor Within, as well as several EPs, on the independent label Wednesday Sound.

His music has been used in a number of video games, movies and TV shows, including CSI, Love, Death & Robots, Silicon Valley, Furi, LittleBigPlanet 2, and Sleeping Dogs.

Lorn has stated that he is influenced by Drexciya, Underground Resistance, Dom & Roland, Technical Itch and Aphex Twin.

== Discography ==
Albums

- Nothing Else (Brainfeeder, 2010)
- Ask the Dust (Ninja Tune, 2012)
- Killzone: Shadow Fall (Official Game Soundtrack) (Sony Computer Entertainment Europe, Ninja Tune 2014) – with Tyler Bates
- Vessel (Wednesday Sound, 2015)
- A/D, Music for Picture (Wednesday Sound, 2017)
- Remnant (Wednesday Sound, 2018)
- Drown the Traitor Within (Wednesday Sound, 2019)

EPs

- 7&13 (Wednesday Sound, 2006)
- Grief Machine (VGR France, 2007)
- None an Island (Brainfeeder, 2010)
- Drugs I - IV (Wednesday Sound, 2011) – with Dolor
- Debris (Ninja Tune, 2013)
- The Maze to Nowhere (Wednesday Sound, 2014)
- The Maze to Nowhere, part 2 (Wednesday Sound, 2014)
- The Maze to Nowhere, part 3 (Wednesday Sound, 2015)
- Drugs V - VI (Wednesday Sound, 2016)
- Zero Bounce (Wednesday Sound, 2020) – with Dolor
- The Map (Wednesday Sound, 2020)

Singles

- "Cherry Moon" (Brainfeeder, 2010)
- "Weigh Me Down" (Ninja Tune, 2012)
- "Ghosst(s)" (Ninja Tune, 2012)
- "Guardian" (Wednesday Sound, 2020)
- "Yo2_Rustlin" (Wednesday Sound, 2021)
- "Yesterday's Pain / Cut the Anchor" (Wednesday Sound, 2022)
- "Entropyyy" (Wednesday Sound, 2022)

Compilations

- Self Confidence Vol. 1 (Wednesday Sound, 2008)
- Self Confidence Vol. 2 (Wednesday Sound, 2011)
- Self Confidence Vol. 3 (Wednesday Sound, 2013)
- Rarities (Wednesday Sound, 2019)

Collaborations

- Lewis James & Lorn - "No Team" from The Death Of Habit (2019)
- Client_03 & Lorn - "The Last Human" from Testbed_Assembly (2025)

Remixes

- Epcot - "And I Could Die Tonight (Lorn Remix)" from Heroes Remixes (2009)
- Jammer - "Better Than (Lorn Remix)" from Better Than (Remixes) (2010)
- Deru - "Peanut Butter & Patience (Lorn Remix)" from Peanut Butter & Patience (2010)
- Eskmo - "Come Back (Lorn Remix)" from Cloudlight / Come Back (2010)
- Amon Tobin - "The Clean Up (Lorn Remix)" from Chaos Theory Remixed: The Soundtrack to Splinter Cell 3D (2011)
- Amon Tobin - "Hokkaido (Lorn Remix)" from Chaos Theory Remixed: The Soundtrack to Splinter Cell 3D (2011)
- Gidgetsparks - "Micro Chip Laugh (Lorn Remix)" from Henry's Memories (2012)

Video games

- Gran Turismo 5 (2010) - featured
- LittleBigPlanet 2 (2011) - featured track "Automaton"
- Dirt 3 (2011) - contributions
- Sleeping Dogs (2012) - featured
- Killzone: Shadow Fall (2013) - composer
- Furi (2016) - contributions
- The Last Night (TBA) - composer
- Ill (2027) - composer

Music videos

- "Weigh Me Down", from Ask the Dust
- "Ghosst(s)", from Ask the Dust
- "Acid Rain", from The Maze to Nowhere, part 2 (2:52) September 24, 2014 – filmed at Cadillac Jack's Diner by the Pink Motel, 9457 San Fernando Road, Sun Valley, California, 34.2415334,-118.396175
- "Anvil", from Vessel (3:32) September 14, 2016, – directed by Geriko (Hélène Jeudy & Antoine Caëcke); design, script and animation by Antoine Caëcke & Hélène Jeudy; character animation by Anthony Lejeune & Manddy Wyckens
- "Until There Is No End", from Nothing Else
- "Perfekt Dark", from Drown the Traitor Within
- "Silhouette", from Remnant
- "Pawo", from Remnant
- "Inverted", from Debris EP – Produced by Dropout Films
- "Timesink", from Drown the Traitor Within
