= Visari (surname) =

- Pronunciation: /vɪˈsɑːri/

Origin
- Origin: Tzotzil language
- Meaning: One who strikes
- Region of origin: Mexico

Visari, (sometimes spelled Visári, Vizári, Visarí, Vizarí, Bisári, Bizári or Wisari) is a common Tzotzil surname originating from the Indigenous Tzotzil peoples of Chiapas in Southern Mexico. The "s" sound can be spelled with either an ‹s› or a ‹z› due to Spanish spelling rules, but in modern Tzotzil it's an ‹s›. Outside of Mexico and parts of Guatemala the name is fairly uncommon but due to immigration of Mexicans, the name can be found in the United States, Spain and Germany. The name in Tzotzil roughly translates as "striker".
