= Killzone (video game) =

2004 video game

- Developer: Guerrilla Games (Note: PlayStation 3 version developed by Supermassive Games)
- Publisher: Sony Computer Entertainment
- Designer: Martin Capel
- Programmer: Michiel van der Leeuw
- Artist: Jan-Bart van Beek
- Composer: Joris de Man
- Series: Killzone
- Platforms: PlayStation 2 PlayStation 3
- Release: PlayStation 2: NA: 2 November 2004; PAL: 26 November 2004; PlayStation 3: NA: 23 October 2012; EU: 24 October 2012; AU: 8 November 2012
- Genre: First-person shooter
- Modes: Single-player, multiplayer

Killzone is a 2004 first-person shooter video game developed by Guerrilla Games and published by Sony Computer Entertainment for the PlayStation 2. It is the first installment of the Killzone series and the first partnership between Guerrilla and Sony. A remaster developed by Supermassive Games was re-released within the Killzone Trilogy for PlayStation 3 as well as a standalone PSN title in 2012.

Killzone takes place in the middle of the 24th century and chronicles the war between two human factions; the Vektans, and the Helghast. The game is played from a first-person view and follows Jan Templar, a high-ranking officer within the Interplanetary Strategic Alliance, as he battles invading Helghast forces on his homeworld of Vekta.

Prior to its release Killzone was heavily anticipated with several publications considering it to be Sony's "Halo killer" title. Upon release, however, the game was met with mixed responses, with critics praising the visuals, sound, and music, but criticizing the gameplay, AI, and technical issues. Killzone spawned several sequels, beginning with a direct sequel, Killzone 2. Sony purchased Guerrilla in 2005.

== Plot ==
Killzone takes place in a fictional world set in the year 2357. After nuclear war rendered much of the Earth uninhabitable in 2055, world governments formed an international order known as the United Colonial Nations. Partnering with private firms, the UCN moved to establish human colonies in Alpha Centauri, a system occupied by two planets: Vekta, a rich Earth-like world (named after the CEO of the mining conglomerate Helghan, Philip Vekta), and Helghan, a barren wasteland named after the same company. The Helghan Corporation sought to buy ownership of Vekta as well, but when the UCN imposed sanctions against its business practices, a war broke out (known as the First Extrasolar War), which led to the ISA, the military arm of the UCN, driving the company out of Vekta. In response, the exiled colonists established their own civilization on Helghan, built on the principles of militarism and authoritarianism. The harsh environment and atmosphere killed many Helghans, forcing the survivors to use respirators and air tanks just to breathe. Eventually, the population, now known as the Helghast, mutated into pale-skinned, occasionally hairless humanoids with increased strength, stamina, and intelligence. Violently xenophobic and convinced of their superiority, the Helghan consider other humans to be beneath them, and dream of one day reconquering Vekta and expanding their empire to Earth and the neighboring star systems.

=== Story ===
Scolar Visari, emperor of Helghan, sends the Helghast Third Army to launch a secret invasion of Vekta. Alerted to the attack, the ISA attempt to prevent it with their SD (Solar Defense) network, but are unable to activate it in time to stop the invaders. With the element of surprise on their side, the Helghast quickly overwhelm the unprepared ISA ground forces and capture several strategic locations, including ISA Central Command.

While taking part in an offensive to slow the Helghast assault, Captain Jan Templar, a veteran ISA officer, is summoned to a meeting by his mentor and close friend, General Bradley Vaughton. Vaughton discloses that the ISA has requested assistance from the UCN and are working to restore the defense network. He also reveals that Colonel Gregor Hakha, a half-Helghan intelligence officer, had, on his orders, infiltrated the inner circle of Third Army commander General Joseph Lente, only to vanish while traveling to an extraction point in Vekta's slums. As Hakha is the only individual with knowledge of how the invasion bypassed SD, he assigns Jan to locate him. After fighting his way through the Helghast occupying the exterior of Central Command, Jan runs into Luger, a former comrade who is now working with an elite ISA division known as the Shadow Marshals. He also recruits the services of Ricardo Velasquez, an ISA gunner seeking revenge for the massacre of his entire platoon.

After rescuing Hakha, the team discovers that General Stuart Adams, the overseer for SD, is secretly working for Lente. He murders Vaughton and takes control of the system, planning to use it to destroy the relief fleet headed to Vekta. Under Jan's leadership, the team destroys several Helghast bases and infrastructure projects, eventually intercepting and killing Lente when he tries to deal with them personally. Adams retreats to the SD control center and tries to reason with the group, explaining that the Helghast will stop at nothing to reclaim Vekta, regardless of how many lives they lose. Nevertheless, the team disables the station and escapes just as the fleet destroys it, killing Adams. Jan and Luger speculate about what the future holds, realizing that the real war is far from over.

=== Voice cast ===
- Kal Weber as Captain Jan Templar
- Taylor Lawrence as Shadow Marshal Luger (credit as Jennifer Lawrence)
- Tom Clarke Hill as Sgt. Rico Valasquez
- Sean Pertwee as Colonel Gregor Hakha
- Brian Cox as Scolar Visari
- Steven Berkoff as General Joseph Lente
- Ronny Cox as General Stuart Adams
- Bob Sherman as General Bradley Vaughton
- John Schwab as Additional ISA Voices
- Kenny Andrews as Additional ISA Voices (credit as Kennie Andrews)
- Kerry Shale as Additional ISA Voices
- Eric Meyers as Additional ISA Voices (credit as Eric Myers)
- Larissa Murray as Additional ISA Voices
- Jonathan Keeble as Additional Helghast Voices
- Gary Martin as Additional Helghast Voices

== Reception ==
Reception

Aggregate score
Aggregator	Score
Metacritic	70/100

Review scores
Publication	Score
Edge	6/10
Electronic Gaming Monthly	7.5/10
Eurogamer	5/10
Famitsu	31/40
Game Informer	7.5/10
GamePro	3.5/5
GameRevolution	C
GameSpot	6.9/10
GameSpy	3/5
GameZone	7.8/10
IGN	7.5/10
Official U.S. PlayStation Magazine	4/5
Detroit Free Press	2/4
The Sydney Morning Herald	3/5

Killzone received "mixed or average" reviews according to the review aggregation website Metacritic. Reviewers cited technical problems with Killzone, including inconsistent AI, occasional bugs, frame-rate issues, distracting graphical glitches, repetition of the same voices, short draw distance, and an awkward control system. Critics also complained about the gameplay, with IGN labeling it "underwhelming and mediocre".

Reviewers such as GameSpy claimed that Killzone partly suffered due to the incredible publicity it received before release, raising expectations only for them to go unfulfilled. Despite this, Killzone was admired for its sound effects, its soundtrack, and its presentation of a gritty war zone; it was also credited for its unique hard sci-fi art design. In Japan, where the game was ported and published by Sega in 2004, Famitsu gave it a score of one seven, one nine, one eight, and one seven for a total of 31 out of 40. Despite the mixed reception, the Academy of Interactive Arts & Sciences nominated Killzone for "Console First-Person Action Game of the Year" and "Outstanding Achievement in Original Musical Composition" during the 8th Annual Interactive Achievement Awards.

The game shipped close to 2 million units worldwide by December 2005.
