= Official U.S. PlayStation Magazine =

Video game magazine

- The final issue of the OPM U.S.
- Categories: Video game
- Publisher: Ziff Davis Media
- First issue: October 1997; 28 years ago
- Final issue: January 2007
- Based in: San Francisco, California, U.S.
- Language: English
- Website: opm.1up.com

Official U.S. PlayStation Magazine (often abbreviated to OPM) was a monthly video game magazine published by Ziff Davis Media. It was a sister publication of Electronic Gaming Monthly. The magazine focused exclusively on PlayStation hardware, software, and culture, covering the original PlayStation, PlayStation 2, PlayStation 3, and PlayStation Portable. Each issue included a disc that contained playable demos and videos of PlayStation games. The magazine had a nearly ten-year run. The first issue, cover dated October 1997, was published September 23, 1997, while the final issue was cover dated January 2007.

After OPM was discontinued in January 2007, the independent PlayStation magazine PSM became PlayStation: The Official Magazine in December 2007, replacing OPM as the official magazine focusing on Sony game consoles.

== Demo discs ==
OPM was the first gaming magazine to include a disc that featured playable demos of PlayStation games. Beginning with issue one, each magazine came with a disc containing playable PlayStation game demos and non-playable video footage. Later, interviews, industry event coverage, and video walkthroughs of games would also be included on the discs. Beginning with issue 49 (October 2001), the magazine came with a PlayStation 2 demo disc, though for a time it would still be alternated with original PlayStation demo discs. Issues 50, 52, and 54 were the last issues to include demo discs for the original PlayStation. All of the demo discs were developed by LifeLike Productions, Inc.

OPM had released one PlayStation Portable demo, Killzone: Liberation. It was available only with the purchase of retail copies rather than subscription issues. The magazine was discontinued before making the assumed transition to PlayStation 3 demo discs.
