= Killzone =

Series of first-person shooter video games

- The original Killzone logo. Subsequent titles use a similar logo.
- Genres: First-person shooter; Third-person shooter
- Developers: Guerrilla Games; Supermassive Games; Guerrilla Cambridge
- Publisher: Sony Interactive Entertainment
- Platforms: PlayStation 2; PlayStation Portable; PlayStation 3; PlayStation Vita; PlayStation 4
- First release: Killzone; 2 November 2004
- Latest release: Killzone Shadow Fall; 15 November 2013

Killzone is a series of first-person shooter video games for Sony Interactive Entertainment's (SIE) video game consoles. The main series and the PlayStation Portable (PSP) installment were developed by Guerrilla Games, a subsidiary of SIE, and the PlayStation Vita installment was developed by Guerrilla Cambridge. Killzone consists of six games, beginning on the PlayStation 2 in November 2004 with Killzone, and continued on the PlayStation Portable in October 2006 with Killzone: Liberation. Killzone 2 was released for the PlayStation 3 in February 2009, and Killzone 3 was released in February 2011, also for the PlayStation 3. Killzone: Mercenary was released for the PlayStation Vita in September 2013, followed by Killzone: Shadow Fall, a launch title for the PlayStation 4, in November 2013.

== Plot synopsis ==
The series is set in the 24th century, showing the galactic war between the Interplanetary Strategic Alliance (ISA) and the Helghan Empire. The Killzone series follows the continuous war between the ISA and Helghast taking place on both ISA Earth colonies and the planet Helghan, the home planet of the Helghast. The series has featured four main protagonists: Cpt/Col. Jan Templar (Killzone and Killzone: Liberation), Sgt. Tomas "Sev" Sevchenko (Killzone 2 and Killzone 3), mercenary Arran Danner (Killzone: Mercenary), and Shadow Marshal Lucas Kellan (Killzone: Shadow Fall).

The main antagonist was originally Helghast Autarch Scolar Visari; his death in Killzone 2 brought about the rise of two new antagonists and the hopeful heirs to Visari's throne in Killzone 3: Jorhan Stahl and Admiral Orlock. After Orlock's death and the unknown details of Stahl's death and the destruction of Helghan, now covered in petrusite, the Helghast now live on Vekta with a giant wall dividing them from the Vektans. "The Black Hand", a Helghast paramilitary terrorist group, was formed under Vladko Tyran, who became an antagonist, along with Lady Hera Visari (Scolar Visari's daughter) who has inherited her father's throne. By the end of Killzone: Shadow Fall, it is revealed that the main antagonist is Stahl, who managed to survive the events of Killzone 3, but is dispatched by Vektan Security Agency director Thomas Sinclair.

== Gameplay ==
Killzone, Killzone 2, Killzone 3, Killzone: Mercenary, and Killzone: Shadow Fall are first-person shooters. Killzone: Liberation is presented as an isometric twin sticks shooter. The games were developed by Guerrilla Games, except for Killzone: Mercenary, which was developed by Guerrilla Games' sister studio, Guerrilla Cambridge, and published by Sony. Players can carry two different weapons at any given time. Players can either obtain ammo or swap out their current weapons with any weapon dropped by a downed foe or from those scattered around the various maps. In Killzone 3, players can carry up to three weapons, with the third weapon spot reserved for heavy weapons (e.g. machine gun, rocket launcher, etc.).

Online competitive multi-player features up to 16 players in Killzone, 32 players in Killzone 2, 24 players in Killzone 3 and Shadow Fall, and up to 8 players in Mercenary. There are various modes of multiplayer. There is an objective based rotation mode, called Warzone (Killzone 2, Killzone 3, and Shadow Fall), where players play all game modes (2 rounds of Assassination, 1 round of Body Count, 1 round of Capture and Hold, 2 rounds of Search and Destroy, and 1 round of Search and Retrieve) one after the other until all modes have been played. Shadow Fall' game modes in Warzone are slightly different. Operations is a new mode for Killzone 3 which is a cinematic mini-campaign for the multiplayer mode. Killzone 3 features a classic Team Deathmatch mode called Guerilla Warfare. Shadow Fall also has a team deathmatch, simply titled Team Deathmatch. Killzone and Killzone 3 are the only games in the series to feature offline split-screen co-op for two players, while Killzone is the only game in the series to feature offline split-screen multiplayer in the Botzone mode (Botzone allows players to play against AI bots and is present in each installment). Liberation features an online co-op campaign as well as a multiplayer mode that supports up to 6 players in ad-hoc and up to 8 players on infrastructure. Shadow Fall features an online co-op survival mode for up to 4 players; however, it can only be accessed by purchasing the Season Pass.

== Games ==
Release timeline
2004	Killzone
2005
2006	Liberation
2007
2008
2009	Killzone 2
2010
2011	Killzone 3
2012	Trilogy
2013	Mercenary
2013	Shadow Fall

=== Main series ===
==== Killzone ====
Killzone was released for the PlayStation 2 in 2004. The game is set in 2357, where the Helghast Empire has recovered from its defeat in the First Extrasolar War and launched a blitzkrieg against the outer Interplanetary Strategic Alliance (ISA) colony planet Vekta. Vekta's orbital Strategic Defense (S.D.) platforms failed, due to sabotage by a Helghan "mole", during the initial assault, allowing the Helghast to land swarms of soldiers onto the surface and making it difficult for the outnumbered ISA forces. Captain Jan Templar, the main protagonist, and his squad are ordered back to the base for reassignment, and are sent to find the ISA operative Hakha and the key in his possession. Templar meets other characters who assist him, such as Shadow Marshal Luger (a female special operations assassin), a heavy weapons specialist named Sergeant Rico Velasquez (a Helghast-hating soldier with an itchy trigger finger), and Colonel Hakha, a half-Helghast, half-Human spy.

==== Killzone 2 ====
Killzone 2 was released for the PlayStation 3 in 2009. Killzone 2 follows the events of Killzone and Killzone: Liberation, and is set on the planet Helghan, the home world of the Helghast who invaded an Interplanetary Strategic Alliance (ISA) colony. Two years after the Helghast assault on Vekta, the ISA has launched an assault on the enemy's homeworld of Helghan. The ISA goal is to capture the Helghast leader, Scolar Visari and bring the Helghast war machine to a halt. The main protagonist is Sergeant Tomas "Sev" Sevchenko, a battle-hardened veteran of the special forces unit the "Legion" assigned to Alpha team, who goes on a mission to take out the Helghast threat. Captain Jan Templar has been promoted to Colonel and is the Fleet Commander of the New Sun, a Cruiser airship set up in the clouds of Helghan over its capital city, Pyrrhus, preparing for a final attack. During the invasion of Helghan, Sev's unit is deployed behind enemy lines to assist the main invasion force. Tasked with securing the enemy capital of Pyrrhus, Helghan's first true city, the team discovers that the Helghast are a more formidable enemy on their home planet. They adjusted to Helghan's hostile conditions and have harnessed the power of the lightning storms that always occur on Helghan which they can use against the ISA. A cold, barren, unforgiving world, Helghan provides a ready defense with thick, acidic air, dust clouds, and violent surgical lightning storms.

==== Killzone 3 ====
Killzone 3 was released for the PlayStation 3 in 2011 and is the only game in the series to feature a special edition support, the PlayStation Move, and utilize 3D gaming. It follows the events of Killzone 2. Visari, the leader of the Helghast, is gone but the war is far from over. Helghast forces have mounted a devastating counterattack, prompting the ISA (Interplanetary Strategic Alliance) evacuation of planet Helghan. As new Helghast battalions appear, armed with more powerful weapons, ISA forces find themselves outmanned, outgunned and surrounded. Two new antagonists, Jorhan Stahl and Admiral Orlock, both want to become the new Autarch of Helghan. Sev returns as the protagonist with Rico and Narville. Admiral Orlock eventually becomes the new Autarch due to a circumstantial decision by the Helghan High Council. In a final confrontation between Stahl and Orlock, Stahl murders Orlock, however, the planet Helghan and Stahls ship is nuked by Sev and his team. However, it revealed that a ship crash landed on Helghan and is greeted by two Helghan soldiers.

==== Killzone: Shadow Fall ====
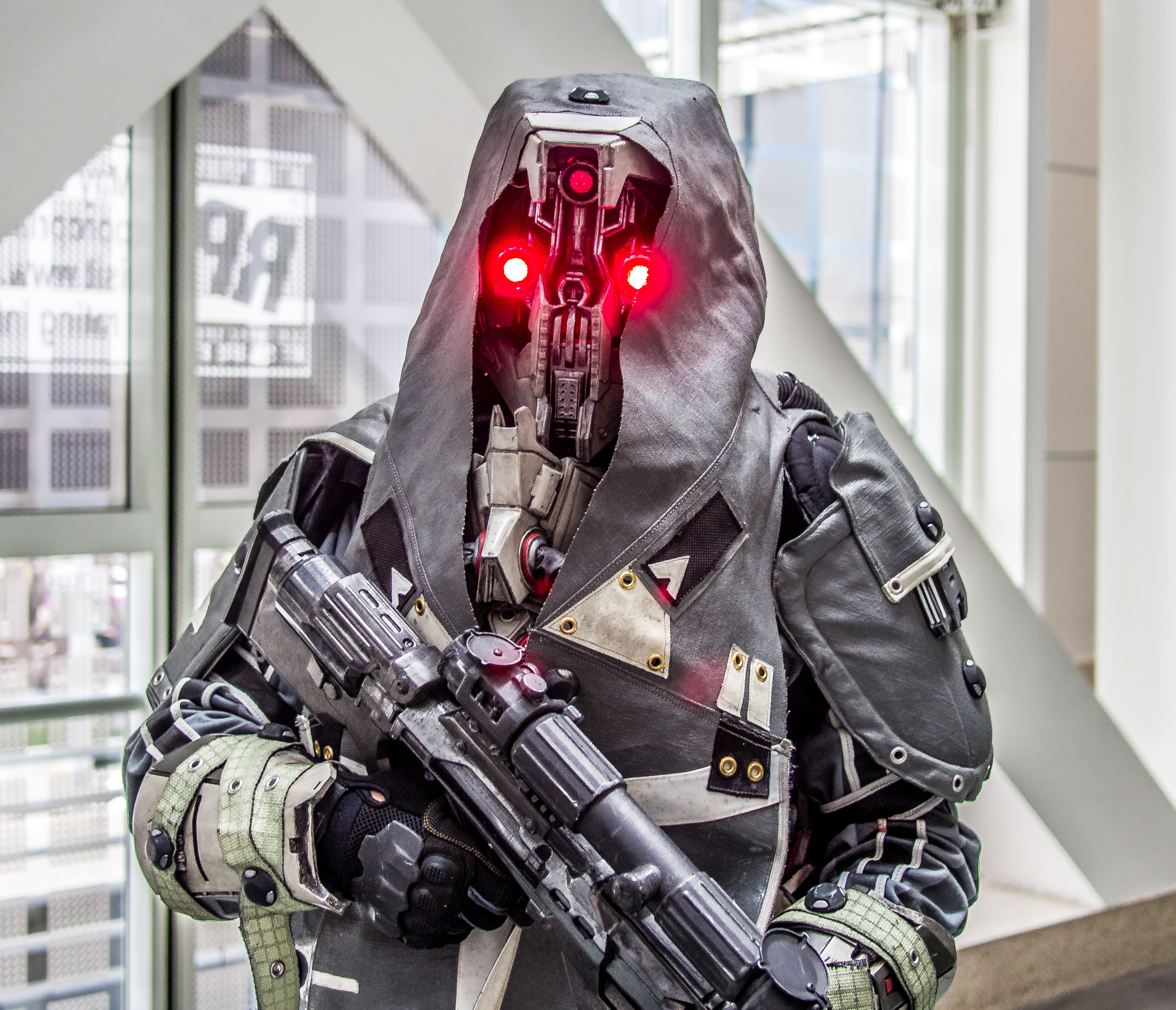
A professional model for the Killzone franchise, pictured at E3 2013

Killzone: Shadow Fall was released for the PlayStation 4 in November 2013. It served as a launch title. The game is set nearly 30 years after the events of Killzone 3. Vektans live side by side with Helghans, though their portions of the city are divided by a massive wall that is known as "The Wall". Helghan citizens are placed and take refuge inside of Vekta, becoming known as Traitors, since they left their side of The Wall, which was claimed as New Helghan. The protagonist, Lucas Kellan, is orphaned when he and his father, Michael, are spotted with Thomas Sinclair, a Shadow Marshal, who attempts to lead them out of the side that was being taken by the Helghan forces after the "Terracide" that occurred in Killzone 3. Kellan's father is shot down by two Helghan soldiers when they are spotted, but Lucas is saved by Sinclair.

20 years later, Kellan has been brought up by Sinclair and has become the youngest Shadow Marshal within the Vektan Security Agency (VSA), while Sinclair has become Director of the VSA. Shadow Marshals are specially trained soldiers. Their main mission is to preserve the peace between the Vektans and Helghast and prevent this from declining. During his travels between Vekta and across the Wall into New Helghast as he undertakes missions to deal with possible Helghan threats, he comes to realize that New Helghan is full of civilians who are innocent. He also meets a Helghan Intelligence Operative,"Echo", a half-breed who is Chancellor Visari's daughter. Kellan is imprisoned and tortured when he is caught in New Helghast. Echo helps him escape to find out that Jorhan Stahl has a "weapon" designed that would annihilate Vektans and half-breeds, which he considers traitors. When Kellan is in reach to kill Stahl; Stahl is shot in the head from behind. Kellan turns to see Sinclair, who also kills Kellan. Sinclair is hailed a hero after killing Kellan and recovering the weapon. Echo, who survived the impact of the crash, sneaks into Vekta and when Sinclair is giving a speech, she assassinates him.

=== Other games ===
==== Killzone: Liberation ====
Killzone: Liberation was released for the PlayStation Portable in 2006. In Killzone: Liberation, two months after the events of Killzone, the Helghast have been dealt a hefty blow from the last game, but the war is far from over. The enemy controls large parts of the planet Vekta, and though the ISA armies are fighting hard, they are losing ground. The rules of war have been cast aside with the sadistic Helghast General, Armin Metrac, employed by the Helghast Emperor Scolar Visari to use brutal measures in order to seize the initiative and strengthen his position further. Jan Templar returns as the main protagonists on a covert operation to save hostages captured by Metrac, while ISA troops continue the fight for liberty. There are 5 "chapters" with 4 levels in which players eliminate the Helghast resistance (The fifth and final chapter was made available to download).

==== Killzone: Mercenary ====
Killzone: Mercenary was released for the PlayStation Vita in 2013. In the game players assume the role of a mercenary who fights alongside either the ISA or Helghast forces depending on which team hires them.

=== Killzone Trilogy ===
Killzone Trilogy is a collection of Killzone, Killzone 2, and Killzone 3 for the PlayStation 3 under Sony's PlayStation Collections line. The original Killzone has been remastered in HD by Supermassive Games to support 720p resolution and Trophies. The collection also includes all DLC maps for Killzone 2 and Killzone 3. It was released in October 2012 in North America and Europe.

== Other media ==
Killzone: Ascendancy, a novel by Sam Bradbury, was released in April 2011. It is a novelization of Killzone 3.

Killzone: Intercept is a 14-minute fan film set in the ISA evacuation of Helghan. The film short has received positive feedback, and was featured on the PlayStation Blog.

In December 2024, Helldivers 2 featured a crossover with the Killzone franchise which introduced Helghast-themed equipment and cosmetics to the game, including two armor sets, three primary weapons, and a special weapon stratagem.

== Reception ==
Aggregate review scores As of November 19, 2013.
Game	Metacritic
Killzone	(PS2) 70 (PS3) 59
Killzone: Liberation	(PSP) 77
Killzone 2	(PS3) 91
Killzone 3	(PS3) 84
Killzone: Mercenary	(Vita) 78
Killzone: Shadow Fall	(PS4) 73

The first Killzone received mixed to positive reviews from magazines and websites. PSM stated that Killzone is "Graphically stunning and hits the mark in so many ways, it's baffling; they promised us we'd experience future war, and we have... and come away shaking." Other reviewers cited technical problems with Killzone, including inconsistent AI, occasional bugs, frame-rate issues, distracting graphical glitches, repetition of the same voices, short draw distance, and an awkward control system. Critics also complained about the gameplay, with IGN labeling it "underwhelming and mediocre" and Into Liquid Sky stating that it needs "more refinement". Sarcastic Gamer's "How to Kill a Brand" (a parody of How to Save a Life) criticized Killzone, saying it didn't deserve a sequel.

Killzone: Liberation received positive reviews, earning IGN's award for Best PSP Offline Multiplayer Game of 2006.

Killzone 2 received critical acclaim upon release with a GameRankings score of 90.56%, and a Metacritic score of 91/100.

Killzone 3 received positive reviews upon release with a GameRankings score of 86.38%, and a Metacritic score of 84/100. The first English review of the game was published by PlayStation Official Magazine (UK), which gave the game a 9/10. The review stated "on a visual level, as a 3D breakthrough, this feels like a watershed moment in a revolution affecting all of gaming". The review also stated on gameplay terms, "Black Ops is the only first-person shooter on PlayStation 3 that can match this". The voice acting, however, was criticised as not being perfect, thus lacking "emotive punch" and the reason for not receiving a perfect 10/10.

Killzone: Mercenary received positive reviews upon release, with critics praising the quality of the title compared to previous shooters on the Vita. It has a Metacritic score of 78/100.

Killzone: Shadow Fall received mixed-to-positive reviews, with a GameRankings score of 73.41% and a Metacritic score of 73/100, making it the second-lowest rated game in the series on both GameRankings and Metacritic. Praise was given to the game's visual presentation and multiplayer modes, while criticism was given to the single-player story and A.I. issues.
