= Nothing Else (album) =

Studio album by Lorn
- Released: June 7, 2010
- Genre: Electronic
- Length: 32:59
- Label: Brainfeeder
- Producer: Lorn

Lorn chronology
Nothing Else (2010)	Ask the Dust (2012)

Singles from Nothing Else
- 1. "Cherry Moon" Released: 2010

Nothing Else is the official debut studio album by American electronic musician Lorn. It was released on Brainfeeder on June 7, 2010. The album was mastered by Clark.

== Critical reception ==
Professional ratings
Review scores
Source	Rating
BBC	favorable
Fact	4/5 stars
NME	3/5 stars
Pitchfork	7.5/10
The Skinny	4/5 stars
Tiny Mix Tapes	2.5/5 marks

Rob Wacey of AllMusic stated that the album "was a resounding success, receiving widespread acclaim." He said, "Many noted its evocative nature throughout, depicting tones and textures of melancholy, paranoia, and aggressiveness through an unwavering dark electronic sound palette and crystalline production techniques." Si Truss of Fact praised "its melancholy intensity and its sheer aggressive force" as "an effect achieved by the combination of Lorn's meticulous, clever production and some aggressive mastering care of UK producer Chris Clark." He added, "there's little denying that Nothing Else is an exceptionally strong full-length debut from an artist with clear talent."

== Track listing ==
All tracks are written by Lorn.

No.	Title	Length
1.	"Grandfather"	1:17
2.	"None an Island"	3:52
3.	"Army of Fear"	2:26
4.	"Bretagne"	2:59
5.	"Automaton"	3:37
6.	"Void I"	2:24
7.	"Void II"	2:10
8.	"Tomorrow"	2:35
9.	"Glass & Silver"	3:08
10.	"Cherry Moon"	3:40
11.	"Greatest Silence"	2:24
12.	"What's the Use"	2:31
Total length:		32:59

== Personnel ==
Credits adapted from liner notes.

- Lorn – production
- Clark – mastering
