= Jack Tretton =

American former chief executive

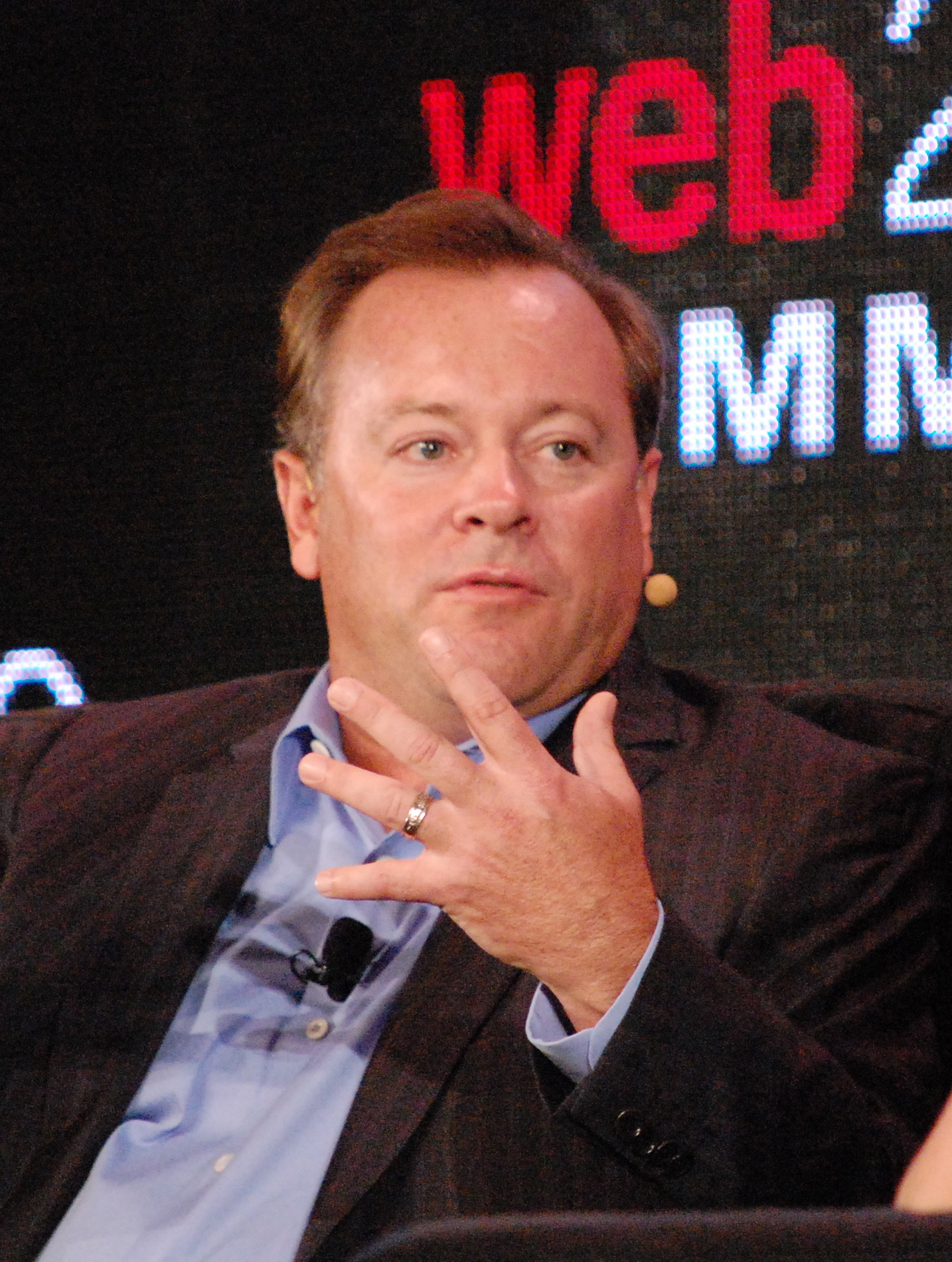
- Tretton in 2011
- Born: Boston, Massachusetts, U.S.
- Education: Providence College
- Occupations: Former President and CEO of Sony Computer Entertainment America
- Term: 2006–2014
- Predecessor: Kaz Hirai
- Successor: Shawn Layden

Jack Tretton is a member of the advisory boards for Genotaur, an artificial intelligence startup, and LifeApps Digital Media, a digital publisher of products and services focused on health, fitness, and sports topics. He is best known for being the former president and CEO of Sony Computer Entertainment America (SCEA) from 2006 to 2014.

== Career ==
After graduating from Providence College, Tretton was a territory manager for Duracell from 1983 through 1985. In 1986 he joined Activision as the vice president of sales until 1991, when he joined JVC Musical Industries and became general manager of JVC's game division until early 1995.

Tretton joined Sony in March 1995 and was part of the team that created the original PlayStation and was involved in the development and publishing of all major Sony consoles and handhelds. In November 2006, Tretton was promoted to president and CEO of SCEA, succeeding Kazuo Hirai who became president and COO of Sony Computer Entertainment. Following his appointment as president, Tretton personally presented Sony's conferences at E3 from 2007 to 2013.

In early March 2014 it was announced that Tretton would step down from his position at the end of the month, citing a mutual agreement between himself and SCEA not to renew his contract. He was succeeded by Shawn Layden, who was previously the executive vice president and COO of Sony Network Entertainment International.

In late May 2014, it was announced that Tretton joined the advisory board of Genotaur, a San Francisco-based artificial intelligence startup, and the following September it was announced Tretton joined the advisory board of LifeApps Digital Media, a digital publisher of products and services focused on health, fitness, and sports topics.

== Professional reputation ==
Tretton has made a number of controversial comments regarding the video game industry. When asked in 2007 to describe each game console as a meal or food, Tretton called the PS3 "Surf 'n Turf" and the PS2 "your favorite burger restaurant," but called the Wii a "lollipop" and the Xbox 360 a restaurant he would "get sick from once in a while because the cook isn't always reliable." He also called the Nintendo 3DS "a great babysitting tool ... But no self-respecting twenty-something is going to be sitting on an airplane with one of those. He's too old for that."

However, shortly after the PlayStation Vita was released in North America in February 2012, Tretton stated that he is a "believer in a rising tide lifting all boats" and that "a successful Nintendo or a successful gaming industry is good for anybody that's in the gaming business."

== Reception ==
Tretton's popularity while working for SCEA led fans, including Greg Miller and Colin Moriarty, to informally refer to him as "Jackie T". He made his appearance on Kinda Funny Live 2 and KindaFunny's PlayStation Podcast "PS I LOVE YOU XOXO" in May 2016

== Personal ==
Tretton was born in Boston, Massachusetts. He graduated from Providence College in 1983 with a Bachelor of Science in Marketing. During his time with Sony, Tretton supported the Lucile Packard Children's Hospital in Palo Alto, California by providing patients with PlayStation consoles and games.
