= Killzone 2 =

2009 first-person shooter

- Developer: Guerrilla Games
- Publisher: Sony Computer Entertainment
- Director: Mathijs de Jonge
- Designer: Neil Alphonso
- Programmer: Michiel van der Leeuw
- Artists: Jan-Bart van Beek; Bas Uterwijk
- Composer: Joris de Man
- Series: Killzone
- Platform: PlayStation 3
- Release: AU: 26 February 2009; NA/EU: 27 February 2009
- Genre: First-person shooter
- Modes: Single-player, multiplayer

Killzone 2 is a 2009 first-person shooter video game developed by Guerrilla Games and published by Sony Computer Entertainment for the PlayStation 3. It is the second main installment in the Killzone series, following 2004's Killzone.

Similar to its predecessor, Killzone 2 takes place in the 24th century and chronicles the war between two human factions; the Vektans, and the Helghast. The game takes place two years after the events of Killzone and follows protagonist Tomas "Sev" Sevchenko as he and his unit battle the Helghast as the Vektans invade Helghan. The protagonist of Killzone and Killzone: Liberation, Cpt./Col. Jan Templar, returns in a supporting role, along with Rico Velasquez. Killzone 2 is played from a first-person view and allows the player to use a variety of weapons. It was released worldwide in February 2009.

Killzone 2 was widely anticipated prior to its release. It was critically acclaimed by critics and fans, who praised it as a superior title to the original Killzone. Additional praise was given to the game's visuals, action, multiplayer modes, soundtrack and atmosphere, although criticism was directed at the narrative. The game's critical and commercial success led to a sequel, Killzone 3, which was released in February 2011.

== Gameplay ==
=== Campaign ===
Killzone 2 at E3 2007

The game is presented almost entirely from a first person perspective, aside from vehicular combat. Killzone 2 features a "lean and peek" cover system which allows the player to take cover behind an object and then pop out to fire at enemies. The "lean and peek" mechanic stays in first-person view at all times. It is also possible for the player to pilot vehicles at two points in the game: a tank and an exoskeleton. Many classic weapons and vehicles from previous Killzone installments return, such as the M82-G and the StA-52 LAR. The Sixaxis motion control feature is also utilized in performing certain actions such as turning a valve, arming an explosive charge and sniping.

=== Multiplayer ===
Warzone, the title of the online multiplayer component of Killzone 2 has been developed by Guerrilla Games in conjunction with the game's single-player campaign. The online multiplayer gameplay is class-based, meaning the player can choose a class of character which is specialized for a specific role to better suit the player's needs in battle. There are 7 classes in total, in which the player can mix and match a main and sub ability according to their playing style, and can switch abilities upon death. There are 15 weapons available to the player, most of which cannot be used until the player reaches a certain rank. Two of these weapons are secondary firearms, and a further two weapons, the Boltgun and Flamethrower, are exclusive to the downloadable maps "Suljeva Cliffside" and "Arctower Landing".

Players play as either the ISA or Helghast, with a few gameplay differences. The character model and respawn points, and the "lean and peek" cover systems were removed. Each class levels up with experience gained from killing enemies or completing mission objectives. With enough experience, players unlock new weapons and skills, as well as a new class. Each class has two badges, the Primary badge selects the class and their specified skill. The secondary badge has an extra skill for the specified class but can be swapped to create own custom class.

Warzone plays out through dynamic matches where multiple game types are played in a single round. The game does not reset between game types, instead flowing between them, with the winning team determined by who wins the most modes. The game ships with five different game types including Assassination, Search & Retrieve, Search & Destroy, Bodycount and Capture & Hold. Online matches can connect 2 to 32 players, and they can group into six squads of up to four players. If an online match does not have a full 32 players, computer-generated "bots" can be added in to create bigger teams (but only in an unranked match). Killzone 2 also offers a clan system, which allows clans of up to 64 players to compete for "Valor Points", an in-game currency that clans can use to bet on tournaments.

Players can also play offline against AIs with Skirmish mode and unranked online multiplayer, but there is no offline multiplayer mode for splitscreen players.

Eight multiplayer maps are included on disc at release, but Guerrilla has released more maps as downloadable content. 6 more maps have been added to multiplayer since release via downloadable content purchasable from the PlayStation Store.

== Plot ==
Two years after the attempted Helghast invasion of Vekta, an ISA fleet led by Colonel Jan Templar is sent to attack Pyrrhus, the capital city of Helghan, with the goal of deposing and arresting Emperor Scolar Visari on charges of war crimes. Among the ISA units taking part in the attack is Alpha Squad, led by Jan's old comrade Ricardo "Rico" Velasquez. Sergeant Tomas "Sev" Sevchenko, a veteran of the ISA "Legion" battalion, is assigned to serve as his second-in-command.

Tasked with securing Pyrrhus against the fierce resistance of the Helghan Second Army, the team quickly discovers that the Helghast are well prepared for an invasion. Using Helghan's harsh environment to their advantage, they have developed new weapons and equipment, none of which the ISA has ever seen before. Furthermore, the planet's fog-like atmosphere, gritty deserts, and constant storms pose almost as much of a threat to the invaders as the enemy themselves.

=== Story ===
Led by Jan's flagship, the New Sun, the ISA bombard Pyrrhus as cover for a massive ground assault on the city. Despite stiff resistance from well-armed Helghast divisions, they steadily advance towards the Imperial Palace, ultimately capturing both Visari Square and the Helghan Military Academy. Just as the main convoy is set to attack the palace, Colonel Mael Radec, commander of the Second Army, activates a network of arc towers hidden beneath Pyrrhus, killing hundreds of ISA soldiers and breaking their momentum.

Dante Garza, a member of Alpha Squad and close friend of Tomas's, retrieves a piece of a destroyed tower and sends it to ISA researcher Evelyn Batton, who learns that the towers are powered by Petrusite, a mineral capable of generating and channeling electricity. She also identifies an old mining outpost on the outskirts of Pyrrhus where the Helghast have been secretly extracting it for military use.

While working to restore the outpost's communication antenna, Tomas and Rico are separated from the rest of Alpha Squad, allowing Radec's men to capture them. The two fight their way through the refinery where the captives were taken, stumbling upon an interrogation overseen by Radec himself. Oddly enough, he demands that Evelyn give him the launch codes to a set of stolen nuclear warheads in Helghast custody. Rico loses his temper and surprises Radec, saving the captives but leaving Garza mortally wounded when one of Radec's men Rico kills discharges his weapon and Garza is shot in the process. Blaming him for his friend's death, Tomas and the squad return to the New Sun.

Before Garza can be properly mourned, an elite Helghast battalion led by Radec mounts a surprise attack on the fleet, boarding or destroying several ships including the Sun. The ship's crew manages to evacuate, but Radec reaches the bridge, mortally wounds Jan and executes Evelyn, downloading the codes before they can be deleted. With the last of his strength and before succumbing to his wounds, Jan maneuvers the ship to crash into the center of Helghan's Petrusite distribution grid, causing it to explode and disrupt the arc network.

Seizing the opportunity, the survivors attempt to regroup, only to witness Visari detonate the warheads over Pyrrhus, destroying it and killing both the entire population and most of the remaining ISA forces.

With ISA captain Jason Narville leading an offensive on the remnants of the Second Army, Alpha Squad breaches the palace, where they encounter Radec and the imperial guard. After a pitched battle, the wounded commander and his men commit mass suicide out of disgrace, clearing the way to Visari's throne room.

As Tomas moves to arrest him, Visari gloats that he has still won, as the Helghast are now united against the ISA, and without him, they cannot be stopped. Overcome with guilt and wanting revenge for Templar and Garza's deaths, Rico kills him on the spot.

Weary from fighting, Tomas exits the palace and sits on the steps. Above him, a large armada belonging to the Helghan First Army begins its attack on what is left of the ISA invasion force.

== Development ==
At E3 2005, Sony announced the game with a trailer depicting soldiers landing in a hostile war-zone on Helghan and fighting Helghast forces. Critics in the media criticized that the trailer did not show actual gameplay footage, as its high level of visual detail has been argued to be impossible to render in real-time on the PlayStation 3 and the audio mix of the trailer was slightly delayed. SCEA's vice president, Jack Tretton, stated that the footage of Killzone 2, that was believed to be pre-rendered, "is real gameplay everybody's seeing out there". Several days later, Phil Harrison, SCE Europe's Vice President of Development, stated in an interview that all of the footage of PlayStation 3 games at E3 2005 were "running off video" which was "done to PS3 spec". Further interviews eventually revealed the trailer was indeed a "target render", a prerendered video showing the developer's goals for the finished product.

At the Game Developers Conference in 2007, a Killzone 2 teaser was shown behind closed doors, and was never released to the public. It featured various battles, destructible environments, and lighting effects among others. Killzone 2 was shown to a panel of journalists at a special pre-E3 2007 event in Culver City, California, and then the next day to the public at Sony's E3 press conference. An in-game trailer showing real-time gameplay of Killzone 2 was also released, along with several videos of extended gameplay. A number of media outlets since E3, such as the BBC, have referred to Killzone 2 as being "one of the most cinematic and immersive games ever produced on a console". At the Leipzig Games Convention in 2007, Killzone 2 was presented in playable form to the media. It was the same demo level as shown at E3 2007, although journalists were allowed to play it hands-on. At Sony's PlayStation Day 2008, the first level in Killzone 2's single-player campaign was presented, named "Corinth River".

Michal Valient, a Senior Programmer at Guerrilla Games, presented details of their Killzone 2 proprietary game engine at a Developers Conference in July 2007. As with many other titles published by SCE, including LittleBigPlanet and Infamous, Killzone 2 uses a deferred shading engine which enables far greater control over the game's characteristic lighting palette, while maximising processor throughput and limiting shader complexity. Other games to use similar approaches include Rockstar Games' Grand Theft Auto IV and GSC Game World's S.T.A.L.K.E.R.: Shadow of Chernobyl. However, this approach does create some additional problems, notably with respect to anti-aliasing and transparencies. The former was solved using a MSAA Quincunx (multisample anti-aliasing) solution, and the latter by the addition of a standard forward rendering path. The game's graphics were universally praised by critics.

The animation was done in Maya 8.5 with some motion capture animations tweaked in MotionBuilder. 3D artists, animators and level designers used Maya as their production environment, which is unusual considering that most 3D games are produced using 3ds max. A large library of custom Maya tools and scripts was created to support these different disciplines. Tools like "Hyperion", a lightmap rendering software, were used in place of Maya's viewport rendering software. In-game animation was assisted with another tool they created called "AnimationBlender" and particle effects were edited using a tool called "Particle Editor". They also created a tool called "ColorTweaker", which gave them the possibility to do color correction on the PS3 in real-time.

Most of the animation was done using motion capture with some animations, reload animations for example, done by hand. Facial animation was done using blendshapes with bones for the jaw and the eyes. Lead tech artist, Paulus Bannink, explains that "The main reason for going with blendshapes was the relative ease with which they can be transferred to different faces, it would also provide a more artist friendly way of editing the facial animation rig.". The cut scene facial animation was done using marker motion capture. In game dialog was done generically using MotionBuilder after audio files were plugged in. The game was developed not only by artists in Amsterdam, but also by people living in New Zealand, Australia, Japan, Korea, the UK and the US. The data files, gigabytes in size, were sent over the internet.

Killzone 2's budget was originally US$20 million but rose to US$40–45 million at the end of the development, with a team of 120.

=== Soundtrack ===
Killzone 2 (Original Soundtrack from the Video Game)

Soundtrack album by Joris de Man
- Released: October 19, 2009
- Genres: Orchestral, Video game soundtrack
- Length: 1:14:22

The score to Killzone 2 was composed by Joris de Man, who scored 60 minutes of in-game music and 30-minutes of live orchestral score for the game, recorded at Abbey Road Studios in London, with the Nimrod Studio Orchestra. The score was produced and mixed by Rich Aitken, regular mix partner for Joris de Man and Marc Canham, at Nimrod Productions.

Killzone 2 (Original Soundtrack from the Video Game)
No.	Title	Writer(s)	Length
1.	"Opening - Birth of War (Retribution)"	Joris de Man	3:40
2.	"The Second Helghan March (Helghan Forever)"	Joris de Man	2:21
3.	"Battle Preparations"	Joris de Man	1:33
4.	"Bridge is Down"	Joris de Man	1:47
5.	"Ambush"	Joris de Man	2:23
6.	"Protecting the Convoy"	Joris de Man	3:14
7.	"Flight into Blood Meridian"	Joris de Man	0:45
8.	"Fight Your Way Through"	Joris de Man	3:21
9.	"Heavy Resistance"	Joris de Man	1:32
10.	"An Unexpected Guest"	Joris de Man	0:58
11.	"The Police Station"	Joris de Man	2:33
12.	"Resistance on the Bridge"	Joris de Man	0:53
13.	"Taking the Bridge"	Joris de Man	3:03
14.	"Petrusite Revealed"	Joris de Man	0:56
15.	"The Academy"	Joris de Man	3:21
16.	"Fight the A.T.A.C."	Joris de Man	1:59
17.	"A Day of Mourning"	Joris de Man	2:36
18.	"Suljeva"	Joris de Man	3:12
19.	"Next Stop Tharsis Refinery"	Joris de Man	2:26
20.	"Question Time with Radec"	Joris de Man	1:18
21.	"Dante Garza RIP"	Joris de Man	1:58
22.	"Going Up"	Joris de Man	2:07
23.	"Templar's Last Stand"	Joris de Man	3:45
24.	"The Exoskeleton"	Joris de Man	3:38
25.	"Nuked"	Joris de Man	1:53
26.	"Radec's Personal Guards"	Joris de Man	3:10
27.	"Visari's Lament"	Joris de Man	4:41
28.	"End Credits Suite"	Joris de Man	8:07
29.	"Fight the A.T.A.C. (Remix)"	Joris de Man	1:12

== Release ==
Beta access was given to a select number of North American and European PlayStation Network subscribers. The beta consisted of three online multiplayer maps; "Blood Gracht" (small), "Radec Academy" (medium) and "Salamun Market" (large), with unlockable ranks and character classes ("badges"). Beta testers had their own statistics and have the ability to enter clan competitions. Beta access was private and thus could not be shared with other PlayStation Network accounts. Also, beta testers are tied with Sony Computer Entertainment by a non-disclosure agreement; therefore they were not allowed to reveal contents of the beta experience. A technical demo of one of Killzone 2's TV commercials, known as the "Bullet" trailer, was released on the PlayStation Store on 2 April 2009. The demo features the commercial itself, the ability to shift camera angles and film speed, and several commentaries from key development staff at Guerrilla Games.

On 5 February 2009, Sony released a single player demo of Killzone 2 on the European/Oceanic PlayStation Store. The demo includes the first two sections of 'Corinth River' (the first level of the game) as well as the tutorial sequence from the final game. A demo card, granting access to a Killzone 2 demo was also offered to US gamers who pre-ordered the game at GameStop. The US demo was also made available to those customers on February 5. In the North American version of PlayStation Home, if users found an avatar dressed in a Helghast costume, the avatar with the Helghast costume would give that user a code for the demo. This occurred on February 16. On 26 February, the demo was made available for download from the PlayStation Store in North America.

The servers for Killzone 2 and Killzone 3 were shut down on 29 March 2018. They have since been offline and can no longer be played online.

=== PlayStation Home ===
In the North American version of PlayStation Home, if users pre-ordered Killzone 2 from Amazon.com, they would receive free male and female I.S.A. and Helghast uniforms for their avatar. In the European version of PlayStation Home, if users participated in the "Killzone AM" event that took place on 28 March 2009, at 11 am CET for one full round, the Home Managers gave the participants a code for the Killzone 2 uniforms. Requirement was that users had to have a United Kingdom PSN account. For a limited time in Japanese Home, users received an I.S.A. uniform for watching the Killzone 2 trailer and answering a questionnaire. To get the Helghast uniform in Japan, users had to do a pre-order. In Home's shopping complex, there are fourteen — seven for male and seven for female — Killzone 2 themed shirts available for purchase as well as the Helghast Tactician uniform. A costume for Radec was released on 4 March 2010 to the European Home and has been released in the North American.

Guerrilla Games have released a Killzone 2 themed apartment called the "Visari Throne Room" for Home. The Visari Throne Room apartment is based on the throne room inside Visari's Palace from the final mission of Killzone 2. For the Visari Throne Room, there are five pieces of furniture based on actual palace furnishings from Killzone 2: two types of Visari-style chairs, an administrative desk, a plant container with authentic Helghan vegetation, and a freestanding painting which portrays an important moment in the colonial history of the Helghast. The Visari Throne Room and matching furniture were made available to the European Home on 2 July 2009, the North American on 27 August 2009, and the Asian and Japanese Home on 9 October 2009.

=== Downloadable content ===
On 10 April 2009 Hermen Hulst, managing director from Guerrilla Games announced on GameTrailers TV that Killzone 2 would get a DLC map pack named "Steel & Titanium" which would contain two new maps called Wasteland Bullet and Vekta Cruiser. With new gameplay elements and strategic twists. The first DLC map pack was released on Thursday, April 30. Hulst stated that the next Killzone 2 DLC map pack that they were releasing would have a 'Retro Vibe' to it.

The second map pack was officially announced on 20 May 2009 as "Flash and Thunder", and features two maps previously seen in Killzone called "Beach Head" and "The Southern Hills". Both maps followed the first map pack by bringing new gameplay elements and strategic twists; Beach Head, the wide open battlefield, with rain-filled trenches, and Southern Hills with its intermittent nuke explosion. It was released on June 11, 2009. Both map packs have twelve trophies that go along with them, six for each map.

On 10 July the third map pack was officially announced, even though Sony stated that there were no plans for a third pack. The DLC "Napalm and Cordite" was released on 23 July 2009, containing two new maps "Suljeva Cliffside" and "Arctower Landing". In addition to the maps, the Flamethrower and the Boltgun both from the campaign made their debut in multiplayer. The Flamethrower is found in the Suljeva Cliffside map and the Boltgun is found in the Arctower Landing map. A multiplayer map pack bundle was also released to coincide with the release of Napalm and Cordite, containing all six maps from the DLC packs, for the price of four maps. The downloadable content pack three has eight trophies that go along with it, four for each map which are for the new weapons. With the fifth anniversary of the original Killzone taking place, the map pack "Flash & Thunder" was reduced in price in North America and Europe.

== Reception ==
Reception

Aggregate score
Aggregator	Score
Metacritic	91/100

Review scores
Publication	Score
Destructoid	9.5/10
Edge	7/10
Eurogamer	9/10
Famitsu	32/40
Game Informer	8.75/10
GamePro	5/5
GameRevolution	A−
GameSpot	9/10
GameSpy	4.5/5
GameTrailers	9.2/10
GameZone	9.4/10
Giant Bomb	5/5
IGN	(US) 9.4/10 (UK) 9.2/10 (AU) 9/10
PlayStation: The Official Magazine	5/5
The Daily Telegraph	9/10
Wired	9/10

Killzone 2 received "universal acclaim" according to the review aggregation website Metacritic. Critics praised the graphics, presentation, intense action, gameplay, and multiplayer, with criticism aimed towards the story and characters.

PlayStation: The Official Magazine said that players "will instantly tag this sequel as a powerful contender for best game of 2009". GamesMaster said that the game's ambition "was to be the best FPS on PS3. At this moment in time, we're not going to argue". 1UP.com said: "With its unparalleled graphics, incredibly well-paced single-player campaign and in-depth multiplayer offerings, Killzone 2 has established its place among top-tier console shooters. Expectations on Killzone 2 had reached ridiculous proportions; here's one of those cases where the game actually lived up to them".

GamePro praised the game's graphics technology and multiplayer depth. In their review, Edge praised the online multiplayer, attention to detail, "unparalleled graphics" and the pacing of the single-player campaign, but included criticism of the game's use of "gameplay clichés" and its weak storyline and characters. GameSpot did not review the game until after its release so that they could experience its online multiplayer features in more depth. Reviewer Kevin VanOrd said: "Killzone 2 boasts amazing visuals, an intense campaign, and extraordinary online play that will keep you coming back for more", but described the game's story and characters as "forgettable" and said that the motion controls seemed "tacked-on". In Japan, Famitsu gave it a score of 32 out of 40.

The A.V. Club gave it an A− and said: "Consider the simplistic storyline a training ground for the surprisingly varied online game, and overdose on visual splendor every step of the way". Wired gave it nine stars out of ten and said: "While Killzone 2 does walk on mostly well-trodden ground, it does so with a keen attention to style and detail, pushing beyond the gray-and-red color schemes that define its competition while encouraging gamers to put a little bit of thought behind every bullet they hurl". The Daily Telegraph also gave it nine out of ten, saying that it was "not a revolution. It was never intended to be. However, it would be folly to disregard its importance, both to the PS3 and the console FPS. It's a refinement of the genre, distilled to its purest and polished to a glittering shine". However, Teletext GameCentral gave it seven out of ten, calling it "one of the best looking games ever, but also one of the least ambitious in terms of anything else".

Killzone 2 won 'Best PS3 Shooter' from IGN. It won 'Best Competitive Multiplayer', 'Best Sound Design', 'Most Improved Sequel', and 'Best Shooter' from GameSpot editor's choice. It won 'Best Graphics' in the G-Phoria 2009 Awards. It also took in Game of the Year from Gamereactor. It was voted PlayStation Game Of The Year at 2009's Golden Joystick Awards. The soundtrack also won gaming's first Ivor Novello Award. During the 13th Annual Interactive Achievement Awards, the Academy of Interactive Arts & Sciences nominated Killzone 2 for "Outstanding Achievement in Visual Engineering".

=== Sales ===
The debut sales of Killzone 2 in the United States were 323,000 within 48 hours of launch. The game failed to meet expectations in March and April, when it sold 296,000 and 58,000 units respectively; by the beginning of May, the game had sold 677,000 copies in the United States. Killzone 2 debuted at number one in UK sales to become the fourth fastest-selling Sony published title. In Japan, the game debuted at number 3, selling 41,000 units. On 16 April 2009, Sony announced that sales of Killzone 2 had surpassed one million worldwide.
