= Horizon Zero Dawn =

2017 video game

- Developer: Guerrilla Games (Note: Ported to Windows by Virtuos with additional work by Nixxes Software. Nixxes also co-developed the remastered version with Guerrilla.)
- Publisher: Sony Interactive Entertainment
- Director: Mathijs de Jonge
- Producer: Lambert Wolterbeek Muller
- Programmer: Michiel van der Leeuw
- Artists: Jan-Bart van Beek; Misja Baas
- Writers: Ben McCaw; Ben Schroder; Anne Toole
- Composers: Joris de Man; The Flight; Niels van der Leest; Jonathan Williams
- Series: Horizon
- Engine: Decima
- Platforms: PlayStation 4; Windows; PlayStation 5
- Release: 28 February 2017: PlayStation 4; NA: 28 February 2017; PAL: 1 March 2017 Windows; WW: 7 August 2020; Remastered; PlayStation 5, Windows; WW: 31 October 2024
- Genre: Action role-playing
- Mode: Single-player

Horizon Zero Dawn is a 2017 action role-playing game developed by Guerrilla Games and published by Sony Interactive Entertainment. The first instalment in the Horizon video game series, it is set in a post-apocalyptic United States where large robotic machines dominate the Earth while humans live in primitive tribes with varying levels of technological development. The game follows Aloy, a young huntress who sets out to uncover her past. The player uses ranged weapons, a spear, and stealth to combat mechanical creatures and other enemy forces. A skill tree provides the player with new abilities and bonuses. The player can explore the open world to discover locations and take on side quests.

Horizon Zero Dawn was Guerrilla Games' first new intellectual property since Killzone in 2004 and its first open-world and role-playing game. Director Mathijs de Jonge considered it the riskiest idea among those pitched. Development began in 2011 after the completion of Killzone 3. The game engine, Decima, was developed for Killzone: Shadow Fall and modified for Zero Dawn. The game uses vibrant colours and was designed to evoke a sense of adventure and hope despite its post-apocalyptic setting. Anthropologists were consulted to inform the world's decay, while experts in robotics were consulted to develop realistic machine designs. Non-fiction books by Jared Diamond, and futuristic fiction such as Nausicaä of the Valley of the Wind (1984) and Princess Mononoke (1997), influenced the design of the game's setting and narrative. The game's cast included Ashly Burch and Lance Reddick, while the soundtrack was composed by Joris de Man, featuring contributions from The Flight.

Released for the PlayStation 4 in February 2017, the game was ported to Windows in 2020 as the first in a series of PlayStation-exclusive video games arriving on personal computers. A remastered version of the game, developed by Nixxes Software, was released in October 2024. Zero Dawn received generally positive reviews from critics, who praised its setting, story, visuals, and combat; however, its role-playing mechanics and unoriginal gameplay received some criticism. The game won numerous awards including one British Academy Games Awards and two D.I.C.E. Awards, and has sold over 24 million units. An expansion, The Frozen Wilds, was released in November 2017. A sequel, Horizon Forbidden West, was released in February 2022. Events in the game are reinterpreted comically in Lego Horizon Adventures. A film adaptation is in the works by PlayStation Productions and Columbia Pictures.

== Gameplay ==
In this gameplay screenshot, Aloy is aiming a bow and arrow at an elk-like machine while riding on a mount.

Horizon Zero Dawn is an action role-playing game played from a third-person view. The player controls Aloy, a huntress who ventures through a post-apocalyptic land ruled by machine creatures. These machines and human enemies, like bandits and cultists, are the game's main types of enemies. Aloy can dodge, sprint, slide, or roll to evade her enemies. Armed with a spear for melee combat, Aloy can also shoot enemies with bows and arrows, set traps such as tripwires, harpoon them to the ground to restrict their movement, or slingshot explosives at them. Different ammunition types offer specialised utility. For example, some arrows help the player dismantle a machine's offensive capabilities by tearing off specific components and disabling weapons, while others can burn or stun enemies. Weapons can also be modified to enhance their qualities such as increasing their damage output or improving their handling. The player can also hide in foliage to ambush nearby enemies, and distract enemies by throwing rocks or whistling. Aloy wears a Focus, a small earpiece that scans machines to identify their location, susceptibilities, level, and the nature of loot they will drop. Information about these machines is then stored in an in-game journal. Machines are categorised into different classes, including Acquisition, Combat, Recon, and Transport, each of which determines their behaviour and response to the player.

Horizon Zero Dawn features an open world that can be freely explored by players. The player uses campfires to save their progress and travel quickly to other locations across the map. Aloy can hack a selection of machines with her spear, some of which can be turned into makeshift mounts. Scaling and hacking large giraffe-like machines known as Tallnecks reveal locations of interest around the map. Exploring underground ruins unlocks additional machines to hack. The main questline handles the major mysteries regarding Aloy's origins and side quests flesh out the world's culture and answer smaller questions. Players can choose from several responses when communicating with non-player characters (NPC), allowing them to shape Aloy's personality during social interactions. The player can also complete optional activities, such as raiding bandit camps, completing hunting challenges, and clearing combat trials in areas of heightened difficulty. The player can find a variety of collectables throughout the game, such as vantages that offer visual information of a past civilisation, metal flowers that contain poetry, and old relics, such as ancient mugs and tribal artefacts.

During exploration, players collect natural resources and machine parts to craft ammo, traps, and potions. Hunting animals also provides materials to craft upgrades that allow Aloy to carry more arrows and consumables. The player can visit merchants to sell unwanted scraps, and purchase additional weapons and outfits. Aloy earns experience points (XP) by completing quests and activities. While individual kills provide a baseline amount of XP, the game rewards skilful play, such as stealth takedowns or headshots, with bonus XP. Once enough XP is accumulated, the player earns Skill Points for upgrading Aloy's abilities. Skills are divided into three categories, allowing players to separately upgrade Aloy's stealth abilities, enhance her combat effectiveness, and improve her healing and gathering capabilities. Through upgrades, Aloy can perform additional feats such as aiming a bow in slow motion, shooting multiple arrows at once, or collecting more resources from each defeated enemy. The player receives rarer variants of the same weapon as they progress the game, allowing access to more ammo types and providing more modification slots.

== Synopsis ==
=== Setting ===
The story is set in a post-apocalyptic Western United States in the 31st century. Humans live in scattered, primitive tribes with varying levels of technological development. Their technologically-advanced predecessors are remembered as the "Old Ones". Large robotic machines dominate the Earth. For the most part, they coexist peacefully with humans, who occasionally hunt them for parts. However, a phenomenon known as the "Derangement" caused machines to become more aggressive toward humans, and caused larger and deadlier machines to appear. The surviving humans are divided into distinct cultures, ranging from the mountain-dwelling, matriarchal Nora hunter-gatherers to the Carja, an empire of desert-dwelling city builders.

=== Plot ===
Aloy is cast out from the Nora tribe at birth and raised by a fellow outcast, Rost. As a child, she obtains a "Focus", an augmented reality device that gives her special perceptive abilities. Curious about her origins, Aloy undergoes years of training to win the "Proving", a tournament that will compel the Nora tribe's matriarchs to reveal her past. Aloy wins the competition, but masked cultists suddenly attack. Rost sacrifices himself to save Aloy from the cult leader, Helis. When Aloy awakens, the matriarchs explain she was found as an infant before a sealed door within the Nora's sacred mountain. They allow Aloy to leave their lands to pursue the cultists. Aloy learns the cultists are a splinter faction called the Eclipse and that she was targeted for her resemblance to an ancient scientist named Elisabet Sobeck. Exploring the ruins of Faro Automated Solutions, Aloy discovers that the past civilisation was destroyed a thousand years ago when Faro lost control of its self-replicating, biomass-consuming military machines. Sobeck spearheaded "Zero Dawn", a project to create an automated terraforming system to eventually deactivate the machines and restore life to Earth.

Aloy is contacted by Sylens, a secretive figure interested in uncovering the fate of the ancients. He guides her to a decommissioned military base beneath the Citadel, the centre of Eclipse power. Aloy learns that Zero Dawn was an underground network of cloning facilities and databases controlled by a single artificial intelligence, GAIA. After the extinction of life, GAIA successfully deactivated the Faro machines and built her own animalistic machines to restore the biosphere. She then reseeded life on Earth using stored DNA, intending to teach the new humans not to repeat past mistakes. However, Ted Faro sabotaged the subsystem containing humanity's history (and thus his culpability for the destruction), reducing the new generation to a tribal society. Aloy also discovers that the Eclipse are secretly controlled by HADES, another of GAIA's subsystems originally designed to enact a controlled extinction if the terraforming process failed.

After obtaining a registry to open the door in the Nora mountain, Aloy is captured by Helis but escapes with Sylens's help. She returns to the Nora, helps them defeat the Eclipse, and finally unlocks the mountain's door. Inside, a recording from GAIA reveals that a transmission of unknown origin caused HADES to go rogue. GAIA attempted to stop HADES by self-destructing, but failed and lost control of her terraforming network, causing the machines to become aggressive. As a contingency, GAIA created a clone of Sobeck in the form of Aloy to one day destroy HADES and restore her functions. Aloy retrieves the master override needed to destroy HADES. Sylens admits he originally founded the Eclipse, tempted by HADES's promises of knowledge, but now realises the AI intends to reactivate the Faro machines and extinguish all life again.

Aloy, aided by her allies, defends Meridian, the capital city of the Carja kingdom, against an Eclipse siege using awakened Faro machines. She kills Helis, and fights off the corrupted machines. She stabs HADES with the master override, ending the war. Aloy journeys to Sobeck's childhood home to mourn her predecessor. In a post-credits scene, Sylens captures the fleeing entity of HADES, intending to interrogate it to find out who sent the signal that awakened it.

== Development ==
Horizon Zero Dawn was developed by the Amsterdam-based studio Guerrilla Games.

Guerrilla Games began developing Horizon following the release of Killzone 3 in 2011. In late 2010, Guerrilla solicited ideas from everyone in the studio as to what their next game would be. There were few guidelines other than no puzzle or racing games. Around 40 pitches were made, and among these was Horizon Zero Dawn, pitched by art director Jan-Bart van Beek, which game director Mathijs de Jonge considered "the most risky" of the concepts. Guerrilla co-founder and managing director Hermen Hulst said a big part of the decision was to move away from the dystopian, gritty tone of the Killzone franchise to a game that was more beautiful and vibrant. Horizon was also chosen because their parent company Sony did not have a western role-playing video game (RPG) in its portfolio at the time. The concept was defined by three pillars: a lush, documentary-style nature setting, robotic dinosaurs, and a red-headed lead character. Development was put on hold briefly when the game Enslaved: Odyssey to the West (2010) released, as it featured a similar post-apocalyptic setting and red-headed protagonist. According to Hulst, the team began prototyping a different project for six months before deciding to pitch Horizon to Sony again, driven by their desire to produce something that was "radically different". Lambert Wolterbeek Muller served as Lead Producer, while Michiel van der Leeuw and Misja Baas oversaw the technical and art directions, respectively.

A small team of 10–20 built prototypes of the game. After Killzone Shadow Fall was completed in late 2013, the remainder of the staff joined Horizon. Guerrilla had roughly 270 internal employees to work on the game, while using 18 different outsourcing companies worldwide. Virtuos, based in Singapore, dedicated 65 employees for over two years to build different machine types and bandit settlements. Other contributors included 3Lateral (Serbia) for facial animation, Territory Studios (New York) for interface design, Audiomotion (London) for motion capture, and Kokku (Brazil) and XPEC Art Center (Taipei) for environmental assets and robotic models. To ensure consistency, Guerrilla provided a large library of reference photos to the outsourcing teams. Horizon had an estimated budget of over €45 million.

=== Gameplay design ===
Unlike many role-playing games that emphasise player choice, Horizon prioritised a more curated, personal story, borrowing the scope and interactive dialogue of RPGs while embracing cinematic storytelling commonly found in action-adventure games. To strengthen its RPG credentials, Guerrilla recruited talent from franchises like The Elder Scrolls and The Witcher. Horizon was designed to be an accessible experience, and the team avoided adding deep role-playing systems to the game. Traditional character stats for Aloy were removed, and the team adopted a simple user interface design. The team was inspired by Fallout 3 (2008), an RPG emphasising emergent gameplay that gives the player agency and freedom to perform actions beyond the developers' original intent. Gameplay was designed to be challenging, especially when the player ventures off the beaten path, and combat was divided into three stages: "prepare", "engage" and "escape". Original designs had the protagonist using a rifle, but this was changed to tribal weaponry because high-tech gunfire felt conceptually wrong for the setting.

Horizon was Guerrilla's first open world game. Van Beek said they had to change their design philosophy from "designing rollercoaster rides" with Killzone to creating full "theme parks" with Horizon. Guerrilla studied the gameplay structure of other open world games, such as The Elder Scrolls V: Skyrim (2011), to determine the density of the game's world. The team wanted to give the player more options for how they approached objectives. Guerrilla designed the game's stealth mechanics to evoke the sensation of a hunt rather than a traditional stealth experience. To achieve this, the artificial intelligence (AI) controlling the enemies was programmed to be lenient during the player's initial detection, but deliberately made it difficult for Aloy to fade back into hiding once fully discovered. This design choice was intended to encourage the player to commit to combat encounters rather than repeatedly fleeing to reset enemy aggravation. Machines were initially the only enemy type in the game, and human enemies were added to introduce more combat variety and show different tribal cultures. The team had to significantly scale back the size of the game world after they realised they could not fill the entire map with content. A plan to support cooperative multiplayer was scrapped.

=== World design ===
Initial work focused on how different human tribes would interact with the machines of the world, which in turn dictated the style of their clothing, architecture, and tools. A major goal for the team was to treat the machines as a natural part of the ecosystem, and show that the tribes viewed them as a standard part of their daily lives and environment. The game's concept explores the juxtaposition between the danger and beauty of the world, particularly analysing the concept of humanity not being the dominant species. It also explores the integration of nature and technology, depicting a world where nature itself has become technological. The game's weapons were designed to reflect the primitive and technologically regressed nature of the surviving civilisation. The developers created distinct cultures like the matriarchal Nora and the patriarchal, technology-embracing Carja to represent diverse worldviews. In extrapolating the game world, Guerrilla collaborated with anthropologists and researched the formation of tribal cultures. Jared Diamond's books, Guns, Germs, and Steel (1997) and Collapse: How Societies Choose to Fail or Succeed (2005) were the team's main sources of inspiration. Despite being set centuries into the future, characters in the game mostly speak plain English, and the team avoided jargon to retain accessibility.

As the game is set in the ruins of an advanced civilisation, the team faced challenges in creating sci-fi imagery that also looked prehistoric. They manually sculpted each ancient structure to ensure it appeared broken and lopsided. These ruins were designed to look frail, to evoke compassion for the people who once lived comfortably there. Despite the game's premise, the world was depicted with vibrant colours. Described as a "post-post-apocalyptic" game, it was designed to evoke a sense of adventure and hope. The team once considered setting the game in Europe and Guerrilla's home country of the Netherlands, though North America was ultimately chosen due to its diverse landscape and recognisable landmarks. The game features two types of underground structures: abandoned military strongholds designed to provide story beats and establish an emotional connection to the people of the past, and AI-controlled assembly lines where machines are built. As the machine factories were built by AI rather than humans, the design directive for these spaces was to be bold and treat the environment like a giant sculpture.

==== The machines ====
The team consulted with the robotics department of the Delft University of Technology for the look of Horizon's machines, and settled on a design featuring an exoskeleton. This design choice created strategic "soft spots" for the player to target with arrows. They worked to avoid overloading machines with blinking lights and colours so that the player could easily identify their status and gameplay functions during combat. The design process for the machines began with rudimentary sketches outlining their basic skeletal structures and in-game functions. Engineers were instructed to design the machines as if they could be physically constructed in reality, and artists used ZBrush to whittle away digital clay for high-detail components like hydraulic joints and armour plates. The team took courses in animal and creature animation, and consulted Dr. Stuart Sumida, a professor who provided anatomical consulting to various film and theme park projects. Since the machines had different sizes and responses to player's actions, the team also had to design varied encounter spaces to support different playstyles and approaches to combat. Guerrilla structured machine encounters to scale alongside the player's expanding knowledge. Early encounters with new machine types typically feature exposed weak points to teach the player specific combat strategies. As the game progresses, armoured variants of those same machines require the player to first remove protective plating before exploiting the vulnerabilities.

Initially, the machines drew inspiration from the militaristic and industrial aesthetic of Killzone, but the developers realised this approach made the player feel like a soldier rather than a hunter. Instead, those ideas were used for the ancient military machines in the game. The mechanical creatures ended up being influenced by real-life animals, so that their movements and behaviours were easily recognisable. For instance, the Tallnecks were inspired by giraffes, the Stalkers by maned wolves, the Longlegs by terror birds, and the Watchers by meerkats and small, bipedal dinosaurs. The development of the game's machines began with early technical prototypes, including a machine dubbed the "Predator" that appeared as a holographic Easter egg in Killzone Shadow Fall. The Thunderjaw, resembling a T. rex, was the team's earliest creation and served as the project's proof of concept. The team spent 18 months bringing the Thunderjaw from initial sketch to a functional in-game state. Sound designers balanced robotic and animalistic noises to create an "emotional impact". Most machines have between 200 and 300 unique sounds and another 150 that are shared between them.

=== Technology ===
Guerrilla had difficulty altering the Decima game engine used with Killzone Shadow Fall for Horizon, as the new game had different priorities with respect to draw distance and loading. The goal was to create an open world with the visual resolution and detail typically reserved for linear first-person shooters. While the rendering core existed, they built new systems for streaming, level editing, and asset placement to support an open-world workflow. The environment was built through a mix of procedural generation and hand-crafting. While vegetation and rivers used procedural placement, rock formations and mountains were hand-made. To maintain performance, the team used optimised rendering techniques for distant rock formations while maintaining visual quality, which saved memory while looking better. "World Data Maps" were used to inform shaders and placement systems about environmental conditions, such as humidity and temperature, allowing for details like fireflies appearing only near bushes at night. The team used a mix of dynamic and pre-calculated lighting solutions. "Irradiance volumes" allowed for high-quality indirect lighting that could still update with the time-of-day cycle. To handle the large amount of foliage, the team used a "placement system" based on texture lookups rather than storing individual object data. Rendering was optimised by using a cheap depth-only pass first to handle expensive alpha testing.

The game uses hierarchical task network planning, which generates sequences of behaviour rather than single actions. It allows for different reactions based on a machine's class: Acquisition machines might flee, while Combat and Recon machines coordinate to hunt the player. To prevent the player from being overwhelmed, the AI decides which machine attacks next based on how interesting or varied the combat will feel. While one machine attacks, others in the group are programmed to circle the player and wait their turn, creating strategic windows for the player to counter-attack or escape. Information is attached to objects like the player, arrows, or rocks in "packets". This allows machines to distinguish between a dead body, an arrow whizzing past their head, or a player hiding in tall grass. Each machine type interprets sensory data differently and, depending on the "strength" of a machine's sensors, the AI might only receive a portion of the available data, creating unique and emergent behaviours for different species. Guerrilla developed two distinct systems to handle the game's varied terrain and machine types: land navigation and aerial navigation. Land navigation uses a navigation mesh that allows ground-based machines of various sizes to move through complex geometry. It is designed to recognise and adapt to changes in local terrain. Aerial navigation uses a completely separate system based on a runtime-generated heightmap of the flyable air space. This allows for hierarchical path planning and specialised behaviours like transitioning from air to ground or performing guided crash-landings.

=== Narrative ===
The meaning of "Horizon" in the title represents "a boundless new world, and also the passage of time (where the Sun rises and sets)" according to the developers. Approximately 20 different stories were written, exploring various concepts, such as different player characters. John Gonzalez, who previously acted as lead writer for Fallout: New Vegas (2010), was hired to write the story as narrative director. Horizon was envisioned as a science fiction title, with all lore firmly grounded in plausible science and realistic extrapolation. Futuristic fiction including Princess Mononoke (1997) and Nausicaä of the Valley of the Wind (1984) served as major touchstones early in the game's development. The narrative also shared a similar structure to the Western genre, as Aloy ventures into new, frontier settlements as a loner and becomes entangled in its conflicts. Major quest lines were inspired by biblical epics like Ben-Hur (1959) and The Ten Commandments (1956).

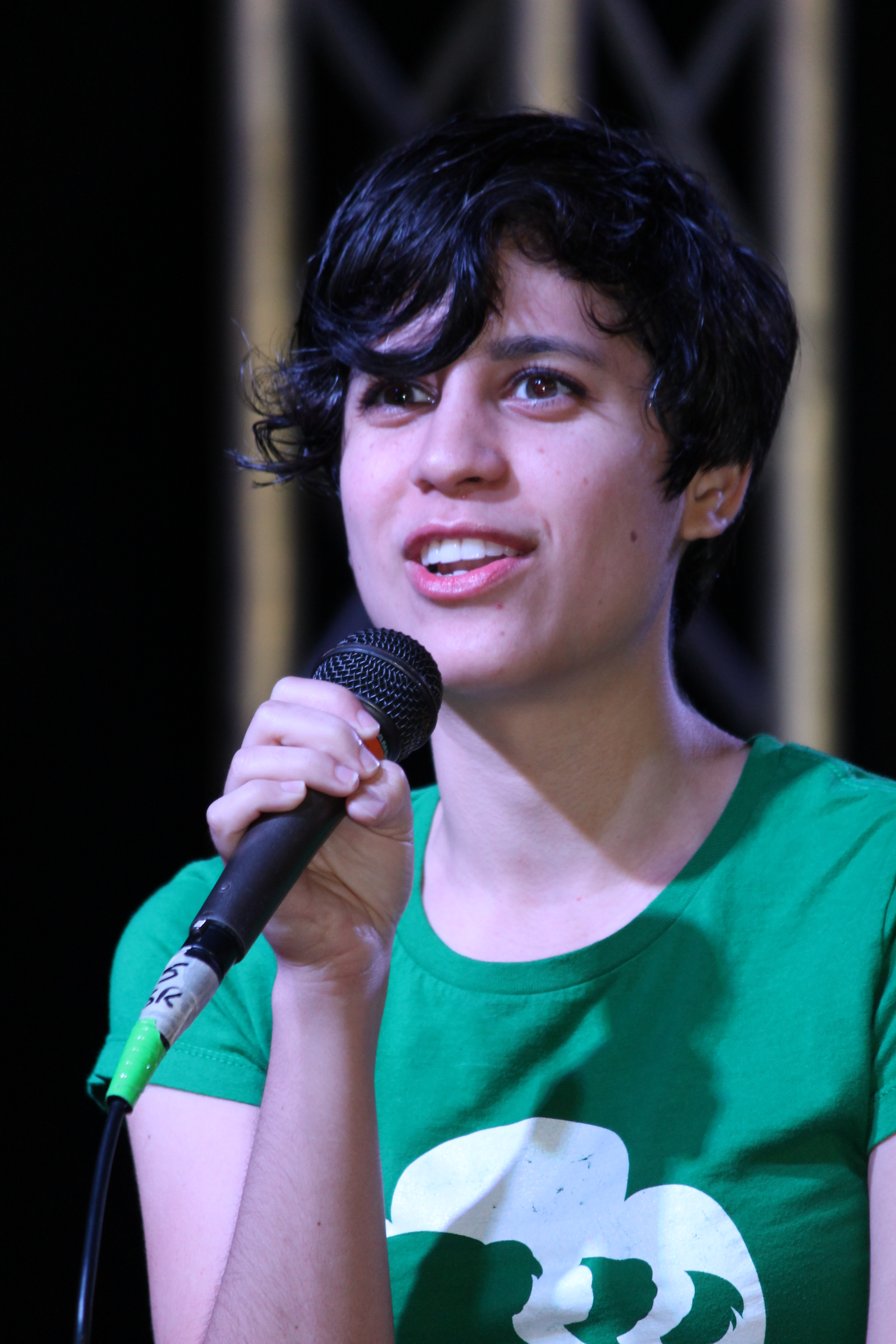
Ashly Burch (pictured in 2014) portrays Aloy.

Aloy remained a core part of the game throughout development. She was originally designed to be younger and more expressive, but the team ultimately decided that a more mature version offered greater narrative opportunities. The writing team initially drew inspiration from female leads like Ellen Ripley from Alien, Sarah Connor from Terminator, and San from Princess Mononoke. The team established her as an outcast of the Nora tribe, allowing the player to empathise with her perspective as an outsider entering a strange new world. The team aimed for Aloy to start as the "least important person in the world" and become the most important. Aloy was designed to be compassionate due to her upbringing. Every side quest began as a narrative concept designed to answer why she, specifically, would want to get involved. While Gonzalez described the core story as an "epic tragedy", side quests allowed the team to explore stories that are lighter, sarcastic, or comedic. Dialogue spoken by NPCs subtly shifts based on the order the player completes main and side quests to maintain narrative consistency.

Ashly Burch voices Aloy, whose likeness is portrayed by Hannah Hoekstra, and motion capture was performed by Amanda Piery. Following an auditioning process in 2014, Burch was called in to do the E3 2015 trailer and proceeded to work on the game for two years in Los Angeles, providing facial motion capture as well. Burch's performance heavily influenced the writing of narrative director John Gonzales. The two of them collaborated closely regarding how she delivered her lines and what he would write for her to say next. They spent considerable time refining her hairstyle to ensure she remained instantly recognisable among the game's cast, regardless of the armour she wore. Sony conducted focus testing to see if a female character was marketable.

=== Music ===
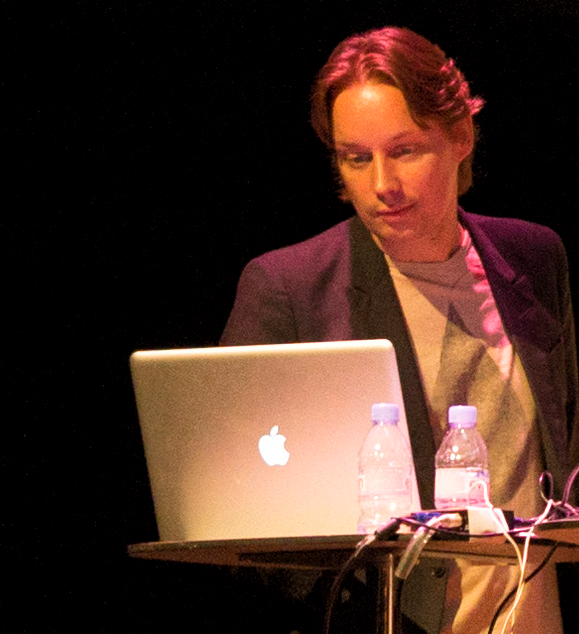
Lead composer Joris de Man (pictured in 2013) used experimental instrumentation in the score.

The game's soundtrack was composed by Joris de Man, The Flight, Niels van der Leest, and Jonathan Williams, with vocalist Julie Elven serving as the primary performer. To handle the open world, the workload was split: De Man concentrated on memorable themes and leitmotifs, The Flight handled textures and soundscapes, van der Leest focused on percussion, and Williams handled various tribal songs in the game. Rather than writing fixed tracks, the composers provided music in "kit form" or stems. This allowed the game engine to layer and rearrange elements dynamically, providing variation and preventing repetition during long gameplay sessions. The composers also did the motion capture for diegetic music vignettes, portraying in-game tribal musicians.

Music supervisor and senior sound designer Lucas van Tol steered away from the heavily compressed, blockbuster orchestral sound common in modern games, opting instead for an intimate, organic feel. Composers were encouraged to play instruments "naïvely"—as if a post-apocalyptic survivor had found a guitar or harmonica and was guessing how to play it. The score was built around three themes: machines, tribes, and nature. For the tribal theme, they experimented with bows on piano wire and resonator guitars (with layered tracks of harmonicas on top of the latter) and playing cellos with plectrums or the back of a bow; de Man also used a contrabass flute and made synth pads from blowing on a Thai bamboo flute. Circuit-bent synthesizers and percussive loops, run through impulse responses of metal and iron being beaten, were devoted to making a thematic identifier for the machines based on technology and metal. They also designed unique physical instruments for the game world, such as the Braumdrum, KunaBass, and Iron Pendulin.

== Release ==
The concept art and the game's codename, "Horizon", were leaked in September 2014. Horizon Zero Dawn was officially announced during Sony's E3 2015 press conference. At E3 2016, Sony had a life-sized cosplay version of one of the machines greet the trade show attendees. Originally set to be released in 2016, the game was delayed to February 2017 to be further polished. It was released to manufacturing in late January 2017, and launched to North American markets on 28 February 2017, in Europe, Australia, and New Zealand on 1 March, and Asia on 2 March for the PlayStation 4. Horizon Zero Dawn is forward compatible with the PS4 Pro, allowing it to run up to 4K resolution. Players who pre-ordered the game received a resource pack that included modifications for weapons and outfits, and materials for crafting ammo and traps. Other bonuses were exclusive to GameStop and EB Games customers, who received in-game upgrades, an outfit, and a bow. The Digital Edition included the resource packs, outfits, and weapons, while the Collector's Edition featured an Aloy statue, an artbook, a steelbook case, 4 resource packs, and the same outfits and weapons as the Digital Edition. A "Thunderjaw Collector's Edition", which included a Thunderjaw statue, was also available. Merchandise released for the game included clothes, plush toys of Aloy, an official art book by Titan Books, Funko Pops, and statues of Aloy and one of the machines, a Stalker. The four-hour soundtrack was released via digital music platforms on 10 March 2017. A making-of documentary was released on Dutch public television in April 2017.

Guerrilla continued to support the game after its initial launch. New Game Plus, an Ultra Hard difficulty mode, additional trophies and aesthetic features were introduced with a patch released in July 2017. The game's expansion, The Frozen Wilds, was announced in June during E3 2017 and released on 7 November. The Frozen Wilds adds a new section to the map that can be reached whether the base game is completed or not. The level cap was increased from 50 to 60 and a new skill tree branch called "Traveler" was added, which focused on ease of movement while riding overridden machines. It introduced new machines and "daemonic machines", which have increased health and inflict more damage when they attack. The Frozen Wilds also introduced "control towers", a device that will keep healing enemies in its proximity until they are destroyed.

The Complete Edition, which bundled the base game, The Frozen Wilds, and all items from the "Digital Deluxe Edition", was released for the PlayStation 4 on 5 December 2017. In an effort to increase profitability, in 2020 Sony decided to begin porting their first-party titles to PC, with Horizon being one of the first. The game was released for Windows via Steam and Epic Games Store on 7 August and GOG on 24 November. Ported by Virtuos with additional work by Nixxes Software, the PC version introduced a number of graphical options and improvements, benchmarking tools, unlocked frame rate, and support for ultrawide aspect ratio.

=== Remaster ===
Improved lighting and character models were among the updates made in the remaster.

Rumours of a remaster being in development began in 2022 and speculation increased after Zero Dawn was removed from PlayStation Plus in May 2024. Co-developed by Nixxes, Horizon Zero Dawn Remastered was announced for Windows and PlayStation 5 on 24 September 2024 and released on 31 October. Remastered includes the previously released downloadable content, including The Frozen Wilds. Its existence received mixed reactions as some journalists and players felt it was too soon to remaster the game because it was already playable on the PlayStation 5 in 4K and 60 frames per second (FPS) following an update in 2021. (Note: Cited to multiple sources) The Steam and Epic Games Store versions of the Complete Edition were delisted with the release of the remaster and initially it was required for PC users to use a PlayStation Network (PSN) account to play. This prevented anyone living in the more than one hundred countries where PSN is unavailable, primarily in the Middle East, Africa, Europe, and Southeast Asia, from playing the remaster. Sony removed the PSN account requirement in February 2025.

Remastered brought over the gameplay, HUD, and accessibility and performance options from the game's sequel Horizon Forbidden West (2022). The terrain system and foliage were graphically updated along with an increase in the number of unique plants. Nixxes looked at the biomes in the original game and used the game's concept art to closely match the types of foliage expected for each biome. The increased amount of memory of the PS5 allowed Nixxes to increase the number of NPCs and introduce more dynamic NPC behaviours. Deforming snow that was introduced in The Frozen Wilds is now used across the whole game for snow and sand. Aloy's character model received the most improvements as her face model from Forbidden West was brought over, which included changes like the addition of peach fuzz, and upgrades to her hair, eyes, and outfits. Remastered features more than 10 hours of re-recorded dialogue and uses new motion capture data for conversations. Nixxes built a new system to integrate the animation data into the game, which made the character movement and facial animations look and feel more natural. New camera angles were also added to these scenes. The audio mix was reworked, which includes better support for surround and 3D audio. The remaster also integrates features of the PS5's DualSense controller including adaptive triggers and haptic feedback, providing specific tactile sensations for different actions. A new optional setting was added that uses both sound and haptic pulses to notify the player of interactable elements in the world, which were previously only marked visually.

== Reception ==
=== Critical response ===
Reception

Aggregate scores
| Aggregator | Score |
|---|---|
| Metacritic | PS4: 89/100; PC: 84/100; PS5 (Remastered): 85/100; PC (Remastered): 86/100 |
| OpenCritic | 94% recommend (Original); 91% recommend (Complete Edition); 89% recommend (Remastered) |

Review scores
| Publication | Score |
|---|---|
| Famitsu | 9/10, 9/10, 9/10, 9/10 |
| Game Informer | 8.75/10 |
| GameSpot | 9/10 |
| GamesRadar+ | 4.5/5 |
| IGN | 9.3/10 |
| Polygon | 9.5/10 |
| Push Square | 9/10 |
| The Guardian | 4/5 |

Horizon Zero Dawn received "generally favourable" reception according to the review aggregator website Metacritic, while 94% of critics recommended the game according to OpenCritic. Critics generally agreed that it was visually impressive with a familiar gameplay design.

The combat received generally positive reviews. Dan Silver from The Guardian described combat as "endurably exhilarating", and liked how each machine required different tactical approaches. Peter Brown from GameSpot found the machine design to be creative and liked how the game gradually introduced more complex variants as the player became more proficient in combat. Their distinct attack patterns were also praised for contributing to combat variety. Several critics wrote that these machine combat encounters created a lot of emergent yet memorable moments, and fighting against larger machines was considered to be a satisfying experience as they tend to push the player to use all gadgets available to them. (Note: Cited to multiple reviews) Several reviewers also noted that combat in the game can be demanding. Phillip Kollar from Polygon compared the cadence of gameplay alternating between crafting, combat and collecting materials to Monster Hunter, and found Horizon to be more approachable. Melee combat and combat encounters with human enemies, however, were singled out as weaker parts of the game.

The game's world design received praise. Writing for The Verge, Andrew Webster praised Guerrilla's attempts at worldbuilding, noticing that each tribe has a unique visual identity reflected in their architecture and clothing design. Kollar observed that Horizon was the result of a team being allowed to do something new, adding that it had more personality when compared with Guerrilla's past works. Jeff Marchiafava from Game Informer noted that the world provided "a remarkable sense of discovery", praising its diverse biomes, machine types and human settlements, while Justin Clark from Slant Magazine wrote that the game had the "most vibrant and beautifully envisioned open worlds in a video game to date". The game's wealth of content and the variety of its activities were also praised. Despite noting the novelty of the game's setting and finding it to be graphically impressive, many reviewers wrote that Zero Dawn did not deviate from the design established by other contemporary open-world games. Webster described it as a "greatest hits" collection of mechanics, while Silver felt the game fell short of being "seminal" due to a lack of innovation. (Note: Cited to multiple reviews) Its implementation of RPG elements, such as predictable side quests, a rudimentary crafting system, and an often-cluttered inventory, was also criticised for being unrefined. Silver from The Guardian and Sammy Barker from Push Square wrote that the game did not actually allow the player to have much agency in the role they play because it follows a very fixed, predetermined path, with Silver suggesting that the RPG mechanics were "lip service to genre expectations".

The game's story received praise by critics. Webster wrote that the game's central mystery kept him engaged despite the slower opening hours, and added that the story was both "personal" and "epic". Kollar was frequently surprised by its narrative, and liked how the game set up future adventures while being self-contained on its own. Several reviewers praised how the game integrated modern-day tribal conflicts and politics in a story about the mysteries of the past. (Note: Cited to multiple reviews) Brown praised Aloy's character development and the story's exploration of themes about nature and technology. He described the central mystery to be "fascinating", though he found the quality of the side content to be inferior in comparison. Silver found the story to be compelling, but disliked the game's reliance on "extraneous exposition" as well as audio and text files to convey the narrative. Aloy was observed to be perfectly coupled with the story in that she offered the curiosity to seek out its many mysteries. Barker described her as a determined yet vulnerable character, comparing her to Katniss Everdeen, Hermione Granger, and Lara Croft. Burch's performance was also praised, with Sam Machkovech from Ars Technica calling her performance "emotionally well-rounded".

The game received some criticism for the similarities between the tribes and Native Americans, but having Aloy, a white female, as the lead protagonist. Dia Lacina, a Native American writer, argued that some of the terminologies used within the game were also considered to be disrespectful. Gonzales said the terminology was discussed during the creative process to make sure that the team was being sensitive to the cultural concerns of the audience. He added that the team did not base the tribes on one group; instead, they looked at people from all around the world and different time periods. Four reviewers in Famitsu complimented the game, with Ranbu Yoshida saying that while it was overall high quality, the game did not break any new ground.

==== Horizon Zero Dawn Remastered ====
Horizon Zero Dawn Remastered received "generally favourable" reception, according to Metacritic, and according to OpenCritic, 89% of critics recommended the game. Critics praised the graphical improvements, (Note: Cited to multiple reviews) the updated character animations, (Note: Cited to multiple reviews) and the technical performance. (Note: Cited to multiple reviews) Criticisms included questioning whether the remaster was necessary, (Note: Cited to multiple reviews) technical and animation issues, (Note: Cited to multiple reviews) and the price for players who did not previously own the game. (Note: Cited to multiple reviews) Empire's Matt Kamen felt that the remaster created a more immersive experience where Aloy feels like a natural part of an "overgrown world" and IGN Benelux's Niels Hassfeld said that Nixxes addressed criticisms of the original game's stiff facial expressions which brought character interactions closer to the quality seen in Forbidden West. TechRadar's Lloyd Coombes noted that actions such as firing a bow or deploying a Tripcaster feel more "kinetic" thanks to the DualSense controller's adaptive triggers and TheGamer's Jade King added that the bigger cities feel more populated and active, with improved character models and immense detail on the clothing.

=== Accolades ===
Prior to its release, Horizon Zero Dawn was nominated for "Most Anticipated Game" at The Game Awards in 2015 and 2016, and "Most Wanted Game" at the Golden Joystick Awards 2016. Several publications listed it as one of the most anticipated games of 2017, including Den of Geek, Entertainment Weekly, The Guardian, Polygon, and Wired. The game also received numerous awards and nominations for its previews at E3 and Gamescom. (Note: Cited to multiple sources)

Zero Dawn received 8 nominations at the 14th British Academy Games Awards, winning the award for "Original Property". The game won awards for two of its 10 nominations at the 21st Annual D.I.C.E. Awards; "Outstanding Achievement in Story" and "Outstanding Technical Achievement". At the 2017 Golden Joystick Awards, the game won "Best Storytelling" and "Best PlayStation Game". The game won for "Outstanding Achievement in Videogame Writing" at the 70th Writers Guild of America Awards. The game's music won multiple awards as well, including at the 2018 Game Audio Network Guild Awards where it won awards for "Best Original Instrumental" and Best "Original Choral Composition", and "Best Original Video Game Score" at the Ivor Novello Awards. A number of publications, including Ars Technica, CNET, Game Informer, GameSpot, GamesRadar+, Polygon, Push Square, Shacknews, Slant Magazine, The Daily Telegraph, The Verge, and VentureBeat recognised Horizon Zero Dawn as one of the best games of 2017. (Note: Cited to multiple sources)

Accolades
| Award | Date of ceremony | Category | Recipient(s) and nominee(s) | Result | Ref. |
|---|---|---|---|---|---|
| Annie Awards | 3 February 2018 | Outstanding Achievement for Character Animation in a Video Game | Guerrilla, Richard Oud, Kevin Quaid, Niek Neervens, Jonathan Colin, PeerLemmers | Nominated | |
| British Academy Games Awards | 12 April 2018 | Artistic Achievement | Guerrilla Games / Sony Interactive Entertainment Europe | Nominated | |
| British Academy Games Awards | 12 April 2018 | Audio Achievement | Guerrilla Games / Sony Interactive Entertainment Europe | Nominated | |
| British Academy Games Awards | 12 April 2018 | Best Game | Guerrilla Games / Sony Interactive Entertainment Europe | Nominated | |
| British Academy Games Awards | 12 April 2018 | Game Design | Guerrilla Games / Sony Interactive Entertainment Europe | Nominated | |
| British Academy Games Awards | 12 April 2018 | Music | Guerrilla Games / Sony Interactive Entertainment Europe | Nominated | |
| British Academy Games Awards | 12 April 2018 | Narrative | Guerrilla Games / Sony Interactive Entertainment Europe | Nominated | |
| British Academy Games Awards | 12 April 2018 | Original Property | Guerrilla Games / Sony Interactive Entertainment Europe | Won | |
| British Academy Games Awards | 12 April 2018 | Performer | Ashly Burch as Aloy | Nominated | |
| D.I.C.E. Awards | 22 February 2018 | Game of the Year | Guerrilla Games / Sony Interactive Entertainment | Nominated | |
| D.I.C.E. Awards | 22 February 2018 | Adventure Game of the Year | Guerrilla Games / Sony Interactive Entertainment | Nominated | |
| D.I.C.E. Awards | 22 February 2018 | Outstanding Achievement in Animation | Guerrilla Games / Sony Interactive Entertainment | Nominated | |
| D.I.C.E. Awards | 22 February 2018 | Outstanding Achievement in Art Direction | Guerrilla Games / Sony Interactive Entertainment | Nominated | |
| D.I.C.E. Awards | 22 February 2018 | Outstanding Achievement in Game Design | Guerrilla Games / Sony Interactive Entertainment | Nominated | |
| D.I.C.E. Awards | 22 February 2018 | Outstanding Achievement in Game Direction | Guerrilla Games / Sony Interactive Entertainment | Nominated | |
| D.I.C.E. Awards | 22 February 2018 | Outstanding Achievement in Original Music Composition | Guerrilla Games / Sony Interactive Entertainment | Nominated | |
| D.I.C.E. Awards | 22 February 2018 | Outstanding Achievement in Story | Guerrilla Games / Sony Interactive Entertainment | Won | |
| D.I.C.E. Awards | 22 February 2018 | Outstanding Technical Achievement | Guerrilla Games / Sony Interactive Entertainment | Won | |
| D.I.C.E. Awards | 22 February 2018 | Outstanding Achievement in Character | Aloy | Nominated | |
| Game Audio Network Guild Awards | 22 March 2018 | Audio of the Year | Guerrilla Games / Sony Interactive Entertainment | Nominated | |
| Game Audio Network Guild Awards | 22 March 2018 | Music of the Year | Guerrilla Games / Sony Interactive Entertainment | Nominated | |
| Game Audio Network Guild Awards | 22 March 2018 | Sound Design of the Year | Guerrilla Games / Sony Interactive Entertainment | Nominated | |
| Game Audio Network Guild Awards | 22 March 2018 | Best Original Soundtrack Album | Guerrilla Games / Sony Interactive Entertainment | Nominated | |
| Game Audio Network Guild Awards | 22 March 2018 | Best Cinematic/Cutscene Audio | Guerrilla Games / Sony Interactive Entertainment | Nominated | |
| Game Audio Network Guild Awards | 22 March 2018 | Best Dialogue | Guerrilla Games / Sony Interactive Entertainment | Nominated | |
| Game Audio Network Guild Awards | 22 March 2018 | Best Original Instrumental | Guerrilla Games / Sony Interactive Entertainment | Won | |
| Game Audio Network Guild Awards | 22 March 2018 | Best Original Choral Composition | Guerrilla Games / Sony Interactive Entertainment | Won | |
| Game Critics Awards | 7 July 2015 | Best of Show | Guerrilla Games / Sony Interactive Entertainment | Nominated | |
| Game Critics Awards | 7 July 2015 | Best Original Game | Guerrilla Games / Sony Interactive Entertainment | Won | |
| Game Critics Awards | 7 July 2015 | Best Console Game | Guerrilla Games / Sony Interactive Entertainment | Nominated | |
| Game Critics Awards | 7 July 2015 | Best Action/Adventure Game | Guerrilla Games / Sony Interactive Entertainment | Nominated | |
| Game Critics Awards | 5 July 2016 | Best of Show | Guerrilla Games / Sony Interactive Entertainment | Nominated | |
| Game Critics Awards | 5 July 2016 | Best Original Game | Guerrilla Games / Sony Interactive Entertainment | Won | |
| Game Critics Awards | 5 July 2016 | Best Console Game | Guerrilla Games / Sony Interactive Entertainment | Nominated | |
| Game Critics Awards | 5 July 2016 | Best Action/Adventure Game | Guerrilla Games / Sony Interactive Entertainment | Nominated | |
| Game Developers Choice Awards | 21 March 2018 | Best Audio | Guerrilla Games / Sony Interactive Entertainment | Nominated | |
| Game Developers Choice Awards | 21 March 2018 | Best Design | Guerrilla Games / Sony Interactive Entertainment | Nominated | |
| Game Developers Choice Awards | 21 March 2018 | Best Narrative | Guerrilla Games / Sony Interactive Entertainment | Nominated | |
| Game Developers Choice Awards | 21 March 2018 | Best Technology | Guerrilla Games / Sony Interactive Entertainment | Won | |
| Game Developers Choice Awards | 21 March 2018 | Best Visual Art | Guerrilla Games / Sony Interactive Entertainment | Nominated | |
| Game Developers Choice Awards | 21 March 2018 | Game of the Year | Guerrilla Games / Sony Interactive Entertainment | Nominated | |
| Gamescom Awards | 19 August 2016 | Best Preview/Vision | Guerrilla Games / Sony Interactive Entertainment | Won | |
| Golden Joystick Awards | 18 November 2016 | Most Wanted Game | Guerrilla Games / Sony Interactive Entertainment | Nominated | |
| Golden Joystick Awards | 17 November 2017 | Best Storytelling | Guerrilla Games / Sony Interactive Entertainment | Won | |
| Golden Joystick Awards | 17 November 2017 | Best Visual Design | Guerrilla Games / Sony Interactive Entertainment | Runner-up | |
| Golden Joystick Awards | 17 November 2017 | Best PlayStation Game | Guerrilla Games / Sony Interactive Entertainment | Won | |
| Golden Joystick Awards | 17 November 2017 | Ultimate Game of the Year | Guerrilla Games / Sony Interactive Entertainment | Runner-up | |
| Golden Joystick Awards | 17 November 2017 | Best Audio | Guerrilla Games / Sony Interactive Entertainment | Nominated | |
| Golden Joystick Awards | 17 November 2017 | Best Gaming Performance | Ashly Burch as Aloy | Won | |
| Ivor Novello Awards | 31 May 2018 | Best Original Video Game Score | Joris de Man, Joe Henson and Alexis Smith | Won | |
| Japan Game Awards | 22 September 2017 | Award for Excellence | Guerrilla Games / Sony Interactive Entertainment | Won | |
| SXSW Gaming Awards | 17 March 2018 | Excellence in Visual Achievement | Guerrilla Games / Sony Interactive Entertainment | Won | |
| SXSW Gaming Awards | 17 March 2018 | Excellence in Animation | Guerrilla Games / Sony Interactive Entertainment | Nominated | |
| SXSW Gaming Awards | 17 March 2018 | Most Promising New Intellectual Property | Guerrilla Games / Sony Interactive Entertainment | Won | |
| SXSW Gaming Awards | 17 March 2018 | Excellence in Gameplay | Guerrilla Games / Sony Interactive Entertainment | Nominated | |
| SXSW Gaming Awards | 17 March 2018 | Excellence in Design | Guerrilla Games / Sony Interactive Entertainment | Nominated | |
| SXSW Gaming Awards | 17 March 2018 | Video Game of the Year | Guerrilla Games / Sony Interactive Entertainment | Nominated | |
| The Game Awards | 3 December 2015 | Most Anticipated Game | Guerrilla Games / Sony Interactive Entertainment | Nominated | |
| The Game Awards | 1 December 2016 | Most Anticipated Game | Guerrilla Games / Sony Interactive Entertainment | Nominated | |
| The Game Awards | 7 December 2017 | Game of the Year | Guerrilla Games / Sony Interactive Entertainment | Nominated | |
| The Game Awards | 7 December 2017 | Best Game Direction | Guerrilla Games / Sony Interactive Entertainment | Nominated | |
| The Game Awards | 7 December 2017 | Best Narrative | Guerrilla Games / Sony Interactive Entertainment | Nominated | |
| The Game Awards | 7 December 2017 | Best Art Direction | Guerrilla Games / Sony Interactive Entertainment | Nominated | |
| The Game Awards | 7 December 2017 | Best Action/Adventure Game | Guerrilla Games / Sony Interactive Entertainment | Nominated | |
| The Game Awards | 7 December 2017 | Best Performance | Ashly Burch as Aloy | Nominated | |
| TIGA Games Industry Awards | 2 November 2017 | Audio Design | Sony Interactive Entertainment Europe | Nominated | |
| TIGA Games Industry Awards | 2 November 2017 | Diversity | Sony Interactive Entertainment Europe | Nominated | |
| TIGA Games Industry Awards | 2 November 2017 | Role Playing Game | Sony Interactive Entertainment Europe | Won | |
| Writers Guild of America Awards | 11 February 2018 | Outstanding Achievement in Videogame Writing | John Gonzalez, Benjamin McCaw, Ben Schroder, Anne Toole; Dee Warrick, Meg Jayanth | Won | |

=== Sales ===
Horizon Zero Dawn was the best-selling game during its release week in the United Kingdom and Australia. It surpassed No Man's Sky (2016) as the biggest launch of a new intellectual property on the PlayStation 4 and was the most successful launch of any kind on the platform since Uncharted 4: A Thief's End (2016), as well as Guerrilla Games' biggest debut to date. The game sold close to 117,000 units in its first week in Japan, becoming the second best-selling game that week. Horizon Zero Dawn was the second most downloaded game on the North American PlayStation Store for February. In March 2017, it was the second best-selling game in the UK and the fourth best-selling game in the US.

Within two weeks it sold 2.6 million units. By the game's second anniversary, it had sold over 10 million units, making it one of the best-selling PlayStation 4 games. The Windows version had a successful launch, moving over 700,000 digital units. By May 2022, it had sold over 2.4 million units on PC, generating more than $60 million in revenue. By 16 April 2023, the game had sold around 24.3 million units. The combined sales of the Horizon franchise reached 38 million units by July 2025, making it one of Sony's most successful properties.

== Legacy ==
=== Sequel ===
Guerrilla announced a sequel titled Horizon Forbidden West in June 2020 at the PlayStation 5 reveal event. The game was released on 18 February 2022 for PlayStation 4 and PlayStation 5, and was ported to Windows on 21 March 2024 The story takes place six months after the conclusion of Zero Dawn. In the game, Aloy ventures into the Forbidden West and uncovers the origin of the extinction signal that triggers the activation of HADES. Ashly Burch reprises her role as Aloy, while Carrie-Anne Moss and Angela Bassett are among the new cast members.

=== Lego reimagining ===
Guerilla enlisted UK-based Studio Gobo as a co-development partner in January 2023 to expand the Horizon universe. Lego Horizon Adventures was announced on 7 June 2024 and released on 14 November for Nintendo Switch, PlayStation 5, and Windows. Key cast members from Zero Dawn return to reprise their roles, but the role of Sylens was recast following the death of Lance Reddick in March 2023, with Tim Russ playing the character in the game. Lego Horizon Adventures reshapes the story of Zero Dawn in an upbeat and family-friendly way, with the team significantly downplaying the apocalyptic story.

=== Film adaptation ===
In January 2025, Sony announced that a film adaptation of the game was in the works at PlayStation Productions and Columbia Pictures. PlayStation Productions president Asad Qizilbash stated that the company had a working script and were searching for a director, and that the company was planning to start shooting the film in 2026 for release in 2027.

=== Other media ===
A tabletop game, Horizon Zero Dawn: The Board Game, was announced as being in development in August 2018 by Steamforged Games. The game was funded on Kickstarter in less than two hours and began shipping out in November 2020. An expansion named "The Sacred Land" was released on 14 September 2021. In March 2020, it was announced that Titan Comics would release a comic book series, including a prequel issue for Free Comic Book Day. The story takes place after the events of the game. The four-issue comic book miniseries called Horizon Zero Dawn: The Sunhawk was supposed to release its first issue in July, but was slightly delayed by the COVID-19 pandemic and released monthly between August and November. A second four-issue miniseries called Horizon Zero Dawn: Liberation was released starting with the first issue in July 2021 and concluded in January 2022. Its story takes place during the events of the game. The comics were co-created and written by Anne Toole, one of the writers for the game.

In May 2022, it was announced that a live action television series adaptation was in development at PlayStation Productions and Sony Pictures Television for Netflix, with Steve Blackman writing and producing the series under his Irish Cowboy production banner. Aloy was expected to be the main character. By January 2024, writing was underway on the series. The series was no longer moving forward by that June after a January 2023 HR complaint was made public, in which twelve former Umbrella Academy (2019–2024) writers and support staffers accused Blackman of "toxic, bullying, manipulative, and retaliatory behavior".
