= Horizon Forbidden West =

2022 video game

- Developer: Guerrilla Games (Note: Ported to Windows by Nixxes Software)
- Publisher: Sony Interactive Entertainment
- Director: Mathijs de Jonge
- Producer: Joel Eschler
- Programmer: Michiel van der Leeuw
- Artists: Jan-Bart van Beek; Misja Baas
- Writers: Annie Kitain; Ariadna Martinez; Nick van Sameren Brand
- Composers: Joris de Man; Niels van der Leest; Oleksa Lozowchuk; The Flight
- Series: Horizon
- Engine: Decima
- Platforms: PlayStation 4; PlayStation 5; Windows
- Release: 18 February 2022: PS4, PS5; 18 February 2022; Windows; 21 March 2024
- Genre: Action role-playing
- Mode: Single-player

Horizon Forbidden West is a 2022 action role-playing game developed by Guerrilla Games and published by Sony Interactive Entertainment. The sequel to Horizon Zero Dawn (2017), the game is set in a post-apocalyptic version of the Western United States, recovering from the aftermath of an extinction event caused by a rogue robot swarm. The player, assuming control of Aloy, must venture into the Forbidden West to find the source of a mysterious plague that kills all it infects. The player can explore the open world and complete quests using ranged and melee weapons against machine creatures and hostile rebels. Forbidden West introduced new gameplay mechanics to the franchise, such as new traversal tools, underwater exploration, and expanded melee combat.

Guerrilla Games began developing Forbidden West in 2018. The development peaked at over 300 full-time employees and cost around US$212 million, making the game one of the most expensive ever to develop. One of the team's goals was to retain the core qualities of the original game, and the team made efforts to expand exploration and combat to support various playstyles. Guerrilla also invested more resources into creating the game's cinematics and spent more time creating character-driven side quests for the game. Ashly Burch and Lance Reddick returned to provide the voice for Aloy and Sylens, respectively, and they were joined by Angela Bassett and Carrie-Anne Moss. As with Zero Dawn, the game was powered by Guerrilla's in-house Decima engine. Announced in June 2020, the game was released for PlayStation 4 and PlayStation 5 on 18 February 2022.

The game received generally positive reviews from critics, who praised the visuals, combat, quest design and the cast's performance, but criticized its story and Aloy's characterization. Most reviewers agreed that Forbidden West was bigger and more refined than Zero Dawn, though it was more of an evolutionary experience than a revolutionary one. It sold over 8.4 million units by April 2023. It was nominated for several end-of-year accolades, including Game of the Year at The Game Awards 2022 and the 26th Annual D.I.C.E. Awards. An expansion, Burning Shores, was released for the PlayStation 5 in April 2023. The game and the Burning Shores expansion were collected together, re-released as Horizon Forbidden West Complete Edition for PlayStation 5 in October 2023, and ported to Windows by Nixxes Software in March 2024. A sequel is in development.

== Gameplay ==
In this gameplay screenshot, Aloy is fighting against a Dreadwing with a Boltblaster.

Horizon Forbidden West is an action role-playing video game played from a third-person perspective, set in a world populated by dangerous, animalistic machines. The player controls Aloy, a hunter who ventures into an uncharted frontier known as the Forbidden West, a post-apocalyptic version of the Western United States, to investigate a mysterious plague. Aloy's primary weapons of choice are bows and arrows. New weapons introduced in Forbidden West include the Shredder Gauntlet, which launches serrated discs useful for tearing armor and components. She can also lay down traps and tripwires, and tether enemies to the ground to immobilize them. Certain weapons in the game have different ammo types which offer specialised utility. For instance, acid ammo may melt an opponent's armor, while shock ammo can stun enemies. Status effects will accumulate and result in the machine being temporarily crippled by them. The player can use Aloy's Focus, a wearable augmented reality device she collected during the events of the first game that gives her special perceptive abilities, to tag an enemy and scan them to identify their weaknesses. Aloy may also detach parts of the machines through her attacks, crippling a large amount of their health, removing their attack capabilities, and occasionally allowing her to use their own detached weapons against them.

Aloy can also attack enemies in close proximity with her spear and chain together her melee attacks. Aloy can hide in tall grass, distract unsuspecting enemies, and silently strike enemies without drawing attention. As the player progresses in the game and completes various quests, they earn more experience points (XP). With sufficient XP, Aloy's health will increase, and skill points may be unlocked. The game's skills are divided into six different categories, allowing players to upgrade Aloy's abilities in melee combat, using traps, ranged combat, scavenging resources, stealth, and overriding machines. By playing the game skillfully (such as performing headshots against human enemies or tearing components off a machine), the player is granted additional combat points, ultimately enabling them to unleash a powerful special attack that inflicts a large amount of damage on enemies.

=== Exploration ===
Like its predecessor, players can freely explore the game world of Forbidden West. The game offers two modes of exploration: Guided mode highlights key items and locations of interest, while Explorer mode has a more minimalistic user interface, requiring the player to reach locations with the help of a compass. Players will discover campfires in the wild, allowing players to travel to other locations instantaneously. and visiting shelters enables the player to change the time of day. The player will meet different non-playable characters (NPCs) and complete side quests for them. While conversing with other NPCs, the player can sometimes choose from one of three dialogue options, with each representing Aloy's tone and attitude towards a scenario or a character, though they will not affect the game's narrative. The player can identify locations of interest by overriding a Tallneck (a giraffe-like machine). They can also venture into underground dungeons, which are a series of platforming challenges culminating in a challenging fight against a machine. There are a large assortment of side activities the player can complete in Forbidden West, including finding remnants of the old civilization, clearing rebel camps and outposts, completing salvage contracts and timed hunting challenges, competing in fight pits against humans or machines, and participating in races riding overridden machines. At major settlements, the player can also play an in-game board game named "Machine Strike".

Aloy's Focus allows her to highlight climbable surfaces. As the player progresses, they will unlock additional tools allowing her to pull down obstacles and grapple onto difficult-to-reach areas. She will also unlock a diving mask that enables underwater exploration, and a glider that allows her to glide through the air. Players can tame certain machines and use them as mounts to travel great distances or turn them against other machines, with the player being able to adjust the aggressiveness of their artificial intelligence. As the player explores the world, they will also collect resources, such as medicinal berries to restore Aloy's health and other crafting components necessary for upgrading Aloy's weapons and outfits at workbenches. Both weapons and outfits are divided into different levels of rarity, with the rarer weapons providing stronger perks. Ingredients can also be brought to a village chef, who will cook a meal for Aloy to briefly improve her combat efficiency. While Aloy can only carry a limited amount of items, extra items collected in the wilds will be directly transferred to a cache found in major outposts or settlements. Accessing the cache allows Aloy to restock necessary items.

== Synopsis ==
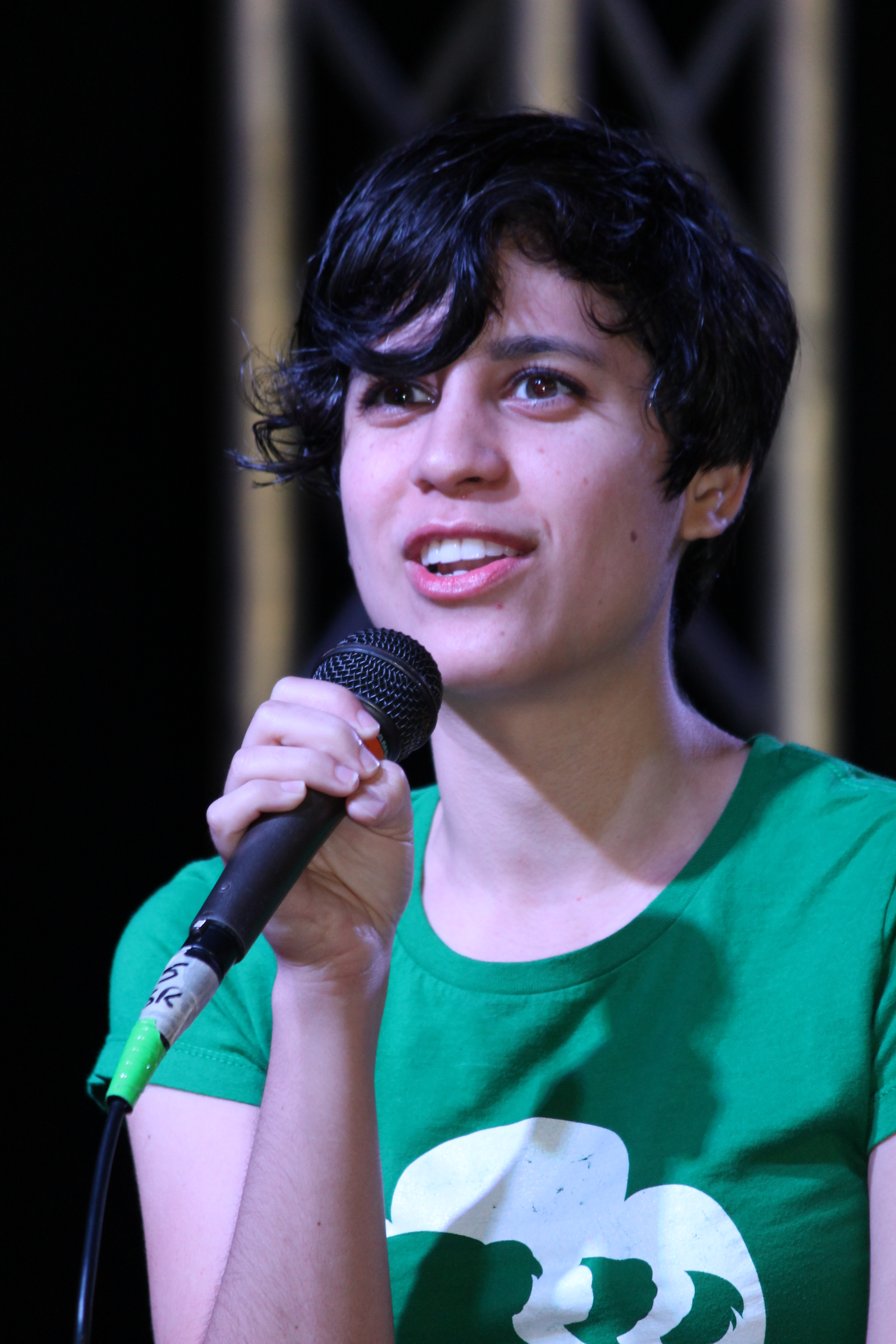
Ashly Burch

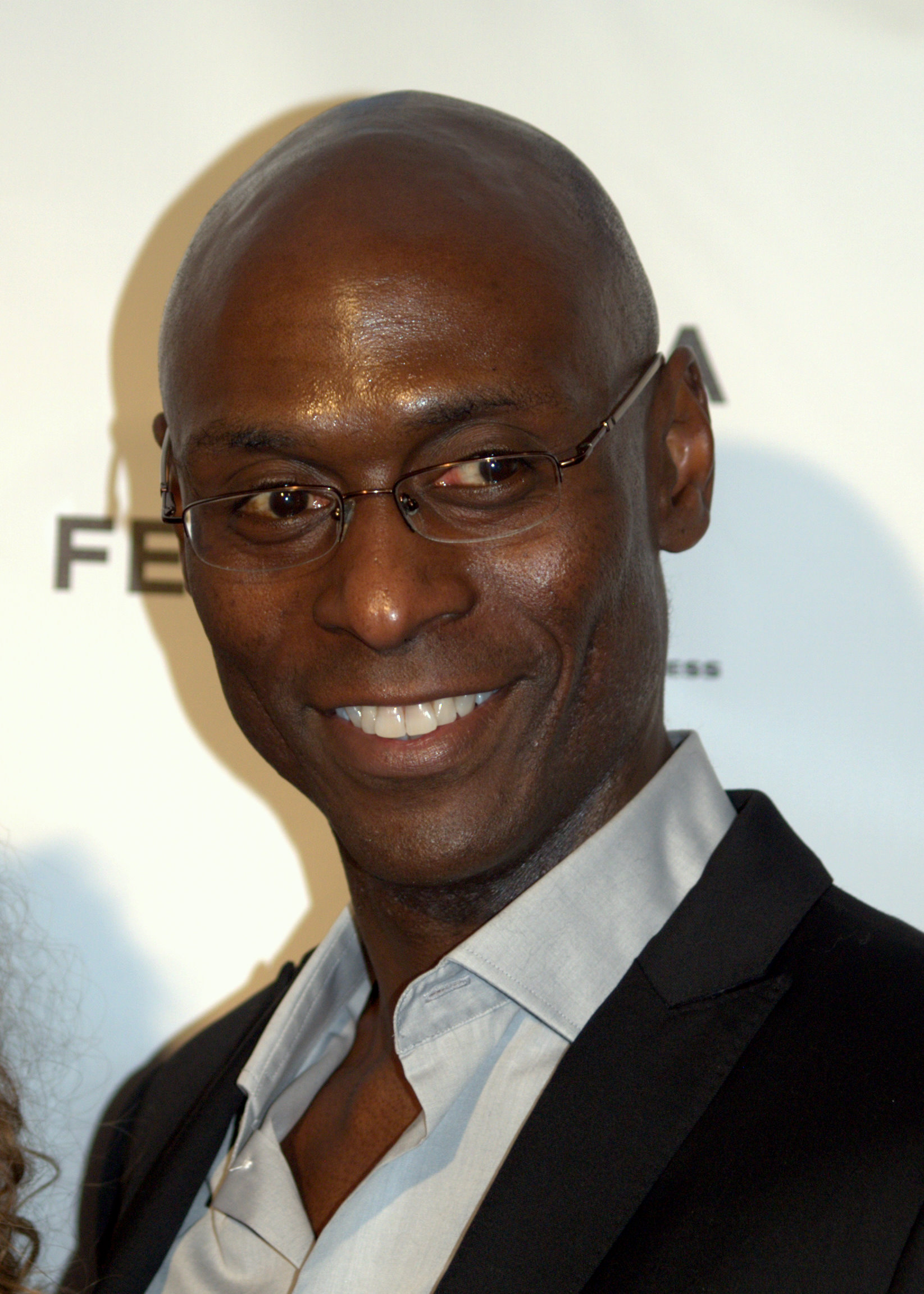
Lance Reddick

Burch and Reddick portrayed Aloy and Sylens, respectively, reprising the roles from Zero Dawn.

The game continues the story of Aloy, a young hunter of the Nora tribe and a clone of the Old World scientist Elisabet Sobeck. In the six months following the defeat of HADES, (Note: As depicted in Horizon Zero Dawn) Aloy has been searching fruitlessly for a working backup of GAIA to restore the planet's rapidly degrading biosphere. After she discovers that her former associate Sylens did not destroy but instead stole HADES, he contacts Aloy and asks her to continue her search in the region known as the Forbidden West.

Aloy and her friend Varl cross into the West to find the ruling Tenakth tribe amidst a civil war between Chief Hekarro and the rebel leader Regalla. Aloy tracks Sylens to a facility where she finds HADES badly damaged and permanently deletes it. She recovers a GAIA backup without its subsystems but is interrupted by a group of futuristic humans. The group, consisting of their leader Gerard Bieri, his lieutenant Tilda van der Meer, enforcer Erik Visser, and a clone of Sobeck named Beta, possesses advanced technology that renders them invulnerable. They take a second GAIA backup, while Aloy barely escapes, and passes out when Varl manages to find her.

Aloy awakens days later in the village of Plainsong, home to the Utaru tribe. Zo, a member of the Utaru, guides Aloy to a control center, where she rejoins GAIA with her subsystem, MINERVA. GAIA locates the other subsystems AETHER, DEMETER, and POSEIDON, and advises Aloy to retrieve them before attempting to capture the more advanced HEPHAESTUS. GAIA reveals that the extinction signal that triggered HADES and mutated the subsystems originated from the Sirius system; Aloy suspects that the futuristic humans sent it. She later tracks down Beta, who informs Aloy that her group is, in fact, Far Zenith, an organization of billionaire colonists who fled Earth during its global extinction, having managed to extend their natural lifespans. After their colony on Sirius collapsed, the Zeniths returned to Earth to use GAIA through Beta's genetic make-up for their own recolonization. At this point they have already acquired subsystems ELEUTHIA, ARTEMIS, and APOLLO, but Beta has stolen their GAIA backup.

Aloy recovers AETHER after helping Hekarro advance in the civil war, retrieves POSEIDON from the ruins of Las Vegas, and recovers DEMETER in San Francisco with the help of Alva, a member of the Quen, a seafaring tribe from foreign lands. Aloy and her companions then devise a plan to help GAIA trap HEPHAESTUS. Aloy, Varl and Beta manage to trap HEPHAESTUS in an inactive Cauldron, but are then attacked by the Zeniths. Erik kills Varl and recaptures Beta while Gerard steals GAIA, but Tilda double-crosses them and helps Aloy escape. Tilda explains that she was romantically involved with Elisabet Sobeck and regretted leaving her; having been inspired by Aloy, she wishes to stop Far Zenith. She further reveals that Sylens has been supporting the Tenakth rebels to use them against the Zeniths. Aloy refuses to sacrifice the Tenakth and instead defeats Regalla herself after thwarting the latter's final attack on Hekarro, forcing Sylens to reconvene with Aloy and help her formulate a new plan.

Aloy and her companions assault Far Zenith's base, while Beta releases HEPHAESTUS into the Zeniths' network, and it builds a near-endless amount of machines that tie down Far Zenith's army of drones. Aloy and her companions defeat and kill the Zeniths, including Erik and Gerard, but learn that their colony was destroyed by Nemesis, a failed mind uploading experiment they created. With Nemesis preparing to pursue them, the Zeniths fled to Earth, hoping to steal GAIA and colonize a new planet unknown to Nemesis. It sent the extinction signal to Earth to deny them that opportunity and it is en route to destroy the planet. Tilda tries to coerce Aloy into leaving Earth with her, but Aloy refuses and is forced to kill Tilda. Aloy's companions disperse to spread the warning of Nemesis while Aloy and Beta reactivate GAIA.

== Development ==
Guerrilla Games began developing Horizon Forbidden West in 2018, a year after its predecessor, Horizon Zero Dawn, was released. It was published by Sony Interactive Entertainment for the PlayStation 4 and PlayStation 5. According to documents from Sony, the five-year development peaked at over 300 full-time employees and cost around US$212 million, making the game one of the most expensive ever to develop. The studio was split into three subteams: the Core Design team responsible for combat, player system, and user interface; the Quest Design team responsible for the design of the game's main quests, side quests, and tutorials; and the World Design team responsible for creating an immersive game world and populating it with activities.

=== Gameplay design ===
The goal for Guerrilla for the sequel was to retain the core qualities of the original game. As with the original game, the team identified three main pillars for development: having strong and memorable characters, exploration emphasizing the majesty of nature and ancient ruins, and strategic combat. The team wanted to ensure that "there is always a mystery" for Aloy to discover, and "always more for her to explore". As a result, underwater and aerial exploration were added to the game, though the development of both were noted to be challenging from a technical perspective. Quest designer Samantha Schoonen described underwater exploration as a "natural extension to traverse long-lost unknown places", and the team intentionally avoided the oppressive tone typically found in these levels in other video games and instead focused on agile traversal and stealth gameplay. The gameplay was designed to promote the player's choices. For instance, new tools were introduced to aid transversal and exploration as well as provide multiple ways to solve environmental puzzles; various playstyles were supported, enabling players to choose how they engage with enemies and switch between playstyles at will; and skill trees were also overhauled completely. The game's underground dungeons (known in-game as Cauldrons) had more varied design to upset the player's expectations. Some cauldrons were also tied to larger and more extensive set pieces.

The gameplay team identified Aloy as a "smart, fast, agile, precise, and resourceful" character and had to translate these personal qualities into gameplay mechanics. Melee and ranged combat were more interweaved together, with special abilities allowing players to quickly change from melee to ranged combat. The team introduced more variety to human enemies, such as armored enemies; their artificial intelligence was also designed to be more aggressive. Whereas in Zero Dawn, human and machine enemies were two disparate groups, Forbidden West integrates the two together by having Aloy fight against human enemies commandeering machines. A number of new machines were introduced in Forbidden West, including the Sunwing (inspired by flying reptiles and primitive birds) and the Tremortusk (inspired by mammoths and war elephants). Zero Dawn establishes the machines in the game as caretakers of the world, and the team programmed each machine type to exhibit behaviors that would match their roles in an ecosystem. Additional textures were added to each machine so the player could better identify their weak points visually, and more audio cues were introduced to better signal their actions to the player. Machine hunting is more vital in Forbidden West, as it was made a more integral part of crafting.

The world in Forbidden West is slightly larger than that in Zero Dawn, though the studio focused on increasing its density to ensure that it was filled with content. NPCs encountered in side quests may reappear as the player progresses further, and completing side quests are rewarded with better gameplay perks and narrative payoffs, as some of them are tied to the overarching narrative. After evaluating player feedback on Zero Dawn, the team decided to make each settlement more dynamic with improved animations and better NPC AI patterns and schedules. An improved crowd system was introduced, with a more diverse range of audio, so that each area within a settlement would sound different. As Aloy heads west, she encounters members of different tribes. According to the team, the Oseram are "social and historically patriarchal", the Utaru are "agrarian" and more laid-back in nature, while the Tenakth are more militant and combat-focused. The team created various animations and outfits distinct to each tribe, highlighting the differences in their ways of life. This also allowed the player to identify tribe members from afar visually and enabled them to get a bearing of where they are in the world.

=== Story and characters ===
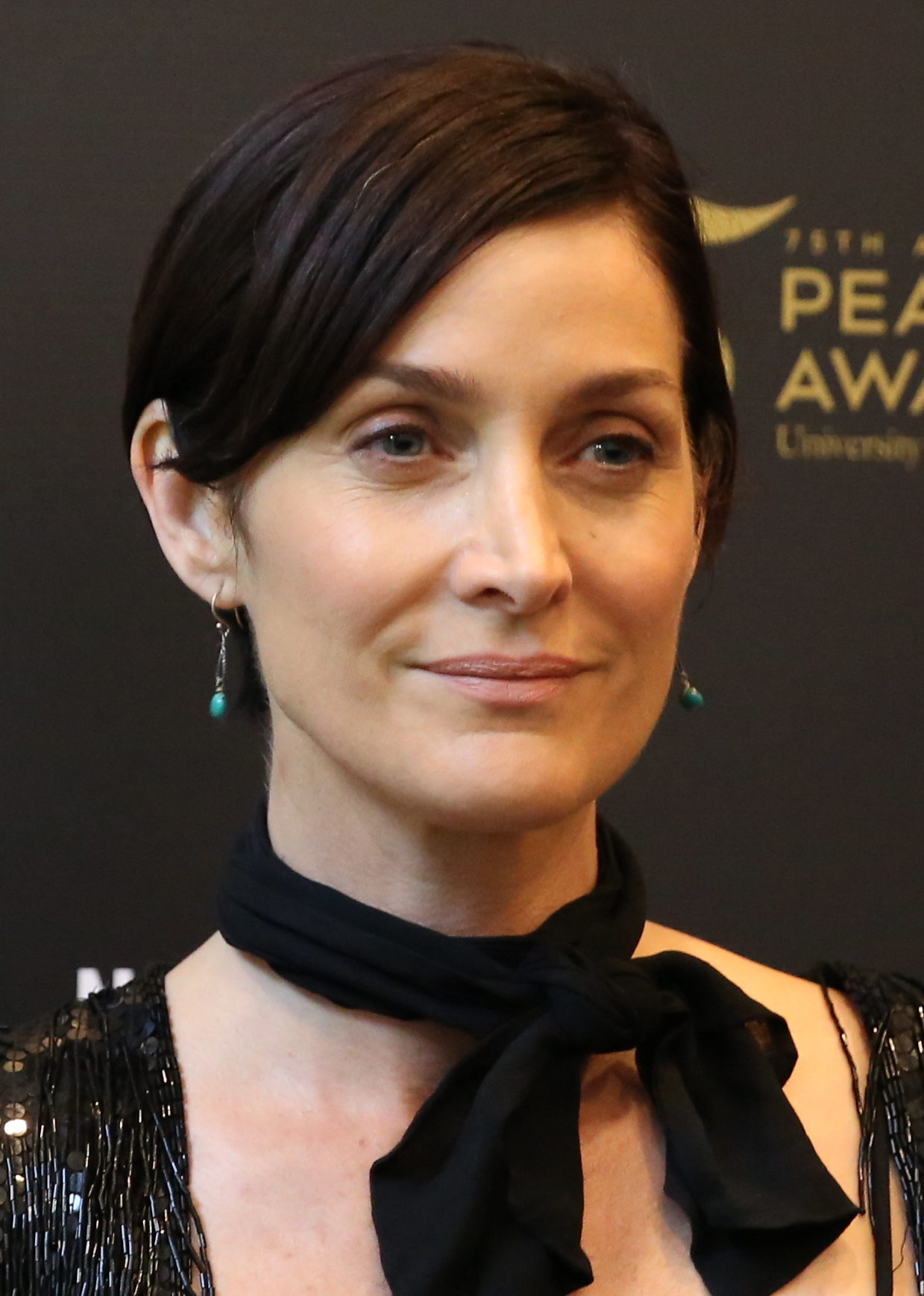
Carrie-Anne Moss

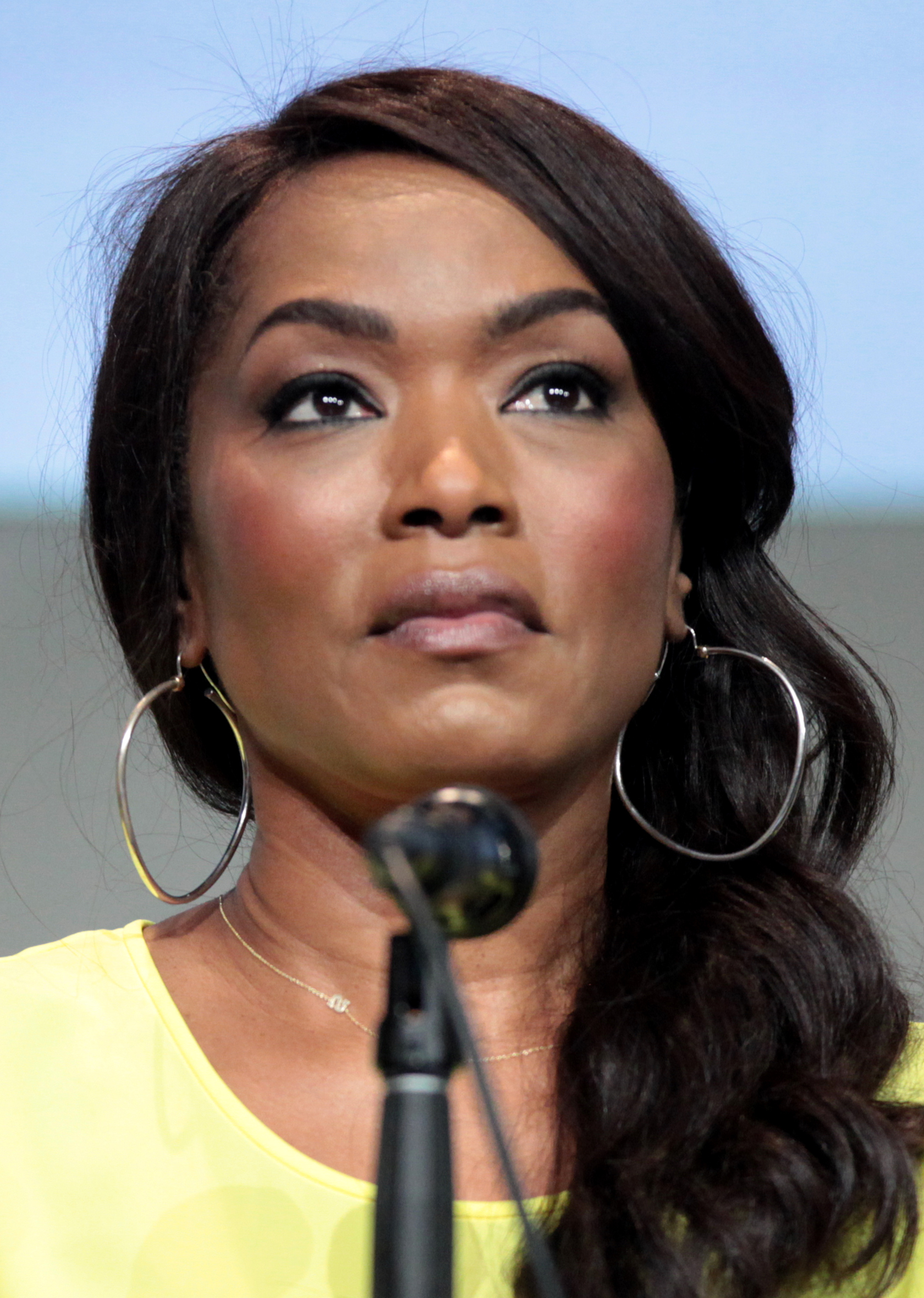
Angela Bassett

Moss and Bassett are newcomers to the franchise, providing voice work for Far Zenith member Tilda and rebel leader Regalla, respectively.

Aloy returned as the game's protagonist. In Forbidden West, she had to deal with another catastrophic extinction-level event, live up to the legacy of Elizebeth Sobeck, an esteemed scientist whom she was a clone of (as depicted in Zero Dawn), and prove herself again in a foreign land. Writer Benjamin McCaw added that the overwhelming amount of pressure Aloy had to face was a significant part of her character arc. Ashly Burch returned to provide voice and motion capture for Aloy, along with Lance Reddick as Sylens, John Hopkins as Erend, and John Macmillan as Varl. Newcomers include Alison Jaye as Alva, Noshir Dalal as Kotallo, Carrie-Anne Moss as Tilda, and Angela Bassett as Regalla. Guerrilla invested more resources into creating the game's cinematics. Advanced motion capture tools allowed the team to record dynamic movement and character expressions more extensively, enabling the team to create character-centric scenes across main quests and side objectives, though travel restrictions during the COVID-19 pandemic forced the team to recruit local talents in Amsterdam to substitute certain cast members.

According to McCaw, Aloy's dynamics with other characters were difficult to write, as her unique upbringing and aspiration meant that she often pushed away her friends as she felt she had to accomplish the mission alone. Aloy had to learn to integrate into society and accept help, ultimately understanding that instead of saving the world in the abstract, it was the people in the world who are worth saving. The team spent more time developing character-driven side quests in order to deepen Aloy's relationships with them. Varl was killed in the game, as the team felt that he was the most important character in Aloy's journey and that his death created an emotional low point for the narrative. Writing Aloy’s relationship with Beta was the most challenging part of the script. As both are clones of Elisabet Sobeck, the team described their contrasting ways of handling the immense pressure and responsibility thrust upon them as the "heart and soul" of the narrative. According to the game's writer, Beta served as a dark reflection of Aloy and embodied "all of Aloy's conflicts about wanting to be like Elisabet, wanting to connect to others, but feeling isolated." Beta was initially written to be an "optimistic" character, though her personalty was changed to that of "a sullen teenager" in order to fit the story.

Far Zeniths were an important part of the story, and their role was envisioned by the team during the development of Zero Dawn. They were chosen as the game's main enemies as the team felt that the story needed to have a different direction when compared with that of Zero Dawn. Having long achieved self preservation, Far Zeniths were egotistical and had little regard for the rest of human life. Tilda, one of the surviving members of the Far Zenith, was created as a "Dutch technologist, authentication expert, and art collector", and the team collaborated with the Rijksmuseum to select 10 art pieces and recreate them inside Tilda's mansion in the game. Ted Faro, the billionaire who doomed the world in Zero Dawn, also returned in Forbidden West. According to McCaw, he has become a "human cancer, a massive cancerous growth" due to the unnatural techniques used to extend his lifespan. The team made an intentional decision not to show Faro's face because Forbidden West was not intended to be a horror game, and the team felt that by only showing his silhouette, it left room for players to imagine what he would have looked like, making the encounter more frightening. As with the previous game, Sylens and Aloy shared an "adversarial" relationship, but the two learn to collaborate despite their mutual disdain for each other.

=== Technology ===
Horizon Forbidden West was the first video game by Guerrilla since Shellshock: Nam '67 (2004) to not be released exclusively for a single console. The studio focused on pushing the game's visuals for the PlayStation 5 during the first half of the game's development, then pivoted to work on the PlayStation 4 version to ensure there would not be significant disparity. The goal for the studio was to ensure that Forbidden West was one of the best-looking PlayStation 4 games while ensuring that the PlayStation 5 version would look even better with easily observable differences. Aerial exploration was nearly scrapped as the team felt that the PlayStation 4 version could not support this feature. The PlayStation 5's increased processing power, custom solid-state drive storage, Tempest Engine, and DualSense controller provide the game with advanced haptic feedback, 3D spatial audio, enhanced lighting, special water rendering, improved visual effects, and reduced loading times. This version has an optional "performance mode" at 60 frames per second with a lower base resolution and an updated version of the Decima engine supporting high dynamic range.

== Release ==
Forbidden West was officially announced by Sony in June 2020. While originally set to be released in 2021, the game was delayed as the COVID-19 pandemic disrupted production schedules, and the team wanted to avoid overworking employees in order to reach deadlines. Prior to launch, Sony's decision to not offer a free upgrade path for PlayStation 4 owners was heavily scrutinized. While Sony subsequently offered a free upgrade path following player backlash, it was criticized for pricing the PlayStation 5 version higher while players of the cheaper PlayStation 4 version could freely upgrade their copies. The full game was released on 18 February 2022. As part of Sony's Play and Plant initiative, Sony will plant one tree in collaboration with the Arbor Day Foundation in three distinct forests for every player who receives the "Reached the Daunt" trophy.

A comic book series, set after the events of the first game, was published by Titan Comics on 5 August 2020. Sony partnered with Dark Horse Comics and released a 200-page art book for the game on 18 October 2022. Steamforged Games partnered with Sony again for a board game based on Forbidden West named Seeds of Rebellion and launched a Kickstarter campaign to fund the project in November 2023. A cookery book titled Tastes of the Seven Tribes by Rick Barba and Victoria Rosenthal was released on 25 June 2024. To promote the game, Sony released a large assortment of merchandise, including partnering with the LEGO Group for the release of the Horizon Tallneck LEGO set, and collaborating with Nendoroid, Spin Master and Dark Horse Comics to create toys and figures based on Aloy. A pop-up cafe was set up in Paris to promote the game from 9 to 11 February 2023. In October 2025, Magic: the Gathering released six cards based around the game as part of their Secret Lair Drops series.

In June 2022, Sony released a free update for the game, introducing New Game Plus, a new difficulty level, and the ability to redistribute skill points, among other new additions. At The Game Awards 2022, an expansion titled Burning Shores was announced. It was released on 19 April 2023 only for the PlayStation 5 and was about a third of the size of the original game. Unlike The Frozen Wilds, the expansion of Zero Dawn, Burning Shores pushes the narrative forward, as it was set after the events of the main game and requires the completion of the main game in order to access the content. It also gives Aloy a potential love interest with Seyka, as the team felt that Aloy pursuing a romantic relationship was a "natural evolution" for the character following her growth in the events of Forbidden West. Seyka was voiced by Kylie Liya Page, while the antagonist, Londra, was voiced by Sam Witwer. The team also added a thalassophobia mode for players who fear large bodies of water and an in-game memorial for Reddick following his passing in March 2023. Sony bundled the main game with the Burning Shores expansion and re-released the game for PlayStation 5 on 6 October 2023 as Horizon Forbidden West Complete Edition. Nixxes Software then ported the Complete Edition to Windows on 21 March 2024.

== Reception ==
=== Critical reception ===
Reception

Aggregate score
Aggregator	Score
Metacritic	(PS5) 88/100 (PS4) 83/100 (PC) 89/100

Review scores
Publication	Score
Game Informer	9.25/10
GameSpot	8/10
GamesRadar+	4.5/5
IGN	9/10
NME	4/5
PC Gamer (US)	70/100
Shacknews	9/10
VG247	4/5

Horizon Forbidden West received "generally favorable" reviews upon release, according to review aggregator website Metacritic. Critics generally agreed that it was a bigger and more improved experience when compared with its predecessor.

Simon Cardy from IGN praised the use of cinematics to convey important parts of the story. He remarked that the story was at its best when it was about the cast's personal dramas and the social and political conflicts surrounding the tribes. Dom Peppiatt from VG247 compared the game's structure to Mass Effect and wrote that "the flirtations with BioWare-style story ideas showed just how much of a future this series has." Several critics noted that the game's focus on character development is an improvement over its predecessor. While some critics praised Aloy as a character and found her struggles to be compelling and relatable, her personality and initial motivations were criticized, with Phil Hornshaw from Eurogamer writing that she was generally not as interesting as the surrounding cast. The cast's performance and the game's motion capture technology were also praised for enhancing the game's storytelling. The direction of the story received some criticism from reviewers. Hetfield wrote that the story went "fully off the rails into wild, nonsensical sci-fi" and criticized the ending and its antagonists. Ben Rayner from Digital Spy, likewise, felt that Forbidden West's pivot to "hard sci-fi" was a baffling choice. Several reviewers remarked that newcomers to the franchise may not be fully engaged in the game's narrative due to its constant callbacks to the events depicted in the first game.

The game's world received praise from critics. Kimberly Wallace from Game Informer enjoyed the visual design of various locales, and praised the world for evoking a "constant sense of discovery". The underwater location set in Las Vegas was singled out by some reviewers as one of the game's best locations. Cardy praised the settlements for how lively they were and remarked that each tribe had their own unique characteristics. The open-world activities and side quests in the game were also praised for being diverse and revealing more about the game's world and characters. Some critics were unimpressed by the game's lack of ambition. James Tucker from NME wrote that Forbidden West would have been a fairly middling open-world game if it were not elevated by its narrative. Writing for Vice, Matthew Gault noted that it was not a revolutionary experience as it merely repeated "what open world games have been doing for years". The game's visuals received critical acclaim from critics, with Wallace describing the game as a "technical marvel" and Bill Lavoy from Shacknews calling the visuals as "breathtaking".

The gameplay received generally positive reviews. Wallace described combat as "adrenaline-pumping" and appreciated the sequel's expanded destructibility and more elaborate setpieces. While she liked the quality-of-life improvements introduced, she was unimpressed by the progression system for only offering unexciting upgrades. Lavoy, however, called gameplay Forbidden West's greatest strength, praising its new additions and the skill tree for providing diverse upgrade options. Writing for GamesRadar, Sam Loveridge wrote that taking down large machines was always challenging but rewarding, and she enjoyed that side activities had more varied design and objectives. Cardy praised the enemy variety and noted that challenging combat prompted players to make full use of Aloy's arsenal and skills. Critics generally liked how the game gave players more options in combat and exploration when compared with Zero Dawn, though some remarked that the new additions could be overwhelming and that the game struggled to introduce these mechanics to players. Some critics remarked that Aloy often ceaselessly provided hints to players about the solution to environmental puzzles, with Hetfield concluding that it robbed players of all agency to explore and chart their own course. Critics had mixed opinions on the game's climbing mechanics, which were found to be inconsistent.

=== Sales ===
In the United Kingdom, Horizon Forbidden West was the best-selling game during the week of release and became the second biggest launch for a PlayStation 5 game at the time, behind only Spider-Man: Miles Morales (2020). By the end of 2022, the game had sold over 530,000 units in the UK. It went on to become the fourth best-selling physical video game in the UK. In the US, it was the second-best-selling video game in February 2022, only behind Elden Ring. It went on to become the ninth-best-selling game of 2022 in the US.

In Japan, the PlayStation 4 version was the third best-selling retail game during its first week of release, with over 48,000 physical units being sold. The PlayStation 5 version sold about 43,000 physical units throughout the same week, making it the fourth best-selling retail game of the week in the country. By 26 March 2023, the game had sold over 155,000 units in Japan. In Germany, the game sold over 200,000 units during its launch month.

In May 2023, Sony announced that the game had sold over 8.4 million units by 16 April 2023. Following the game's launch on Windows, it became the publisher's sixth biggest launch on Steam, though it was unable to surpass the concurrent player peak of Zero Dawn.

=== Accolades ===
Accolades
Award	Date	Category	Recipient(s)	Result	Ref.
Annie Awards	25 February 2023	Best Character Animation – Video Game	Richard Oud, Jan-Erik Sjovall, Guerrilla Animation Team	Nominated	
British Academy Games Awards	30 March 2023	Animation	Guerrilla/Sony Interactive Entertainment	Nominated	
British Academy Games Awards	30 March 2023	Audio Achievement	Guerrilla/Sony Interactive Entertainment	Nominated	
British Academy Games Awards	30 March 2023	EE Game of the Year	Guerrilla/Sony Interactive Entertainment	Nominated	
British Academy Games Awards	30 March 2023	Game Design	Guerrilla/Sony Interactive Entertainment	Nominated	
British Academy Games Awards	30 March 2023	Technical Achievement	Guerrilla/Sony Interactive Entertainment	Won	
British Academy Games Awards	30 March 2023	Performer in a Supporting Role	Alison Jaye as Alva	Nominated	
D.I.C.E. Awards	23 February 2023	Game of the Year	Angie Smets, Jan-Bart van Beek, Mathijs de Jonge, Joel Eschler, Michiel van der Leeuw	Nominated	
D.I.C.E. Awards	23 February 2023	Adventure Game of the Year	Angie Smets, Jan-Bart van Beek, Mathijs de Jonge, Joel Eschler, Michiel van der Leeuw	Nominated	
D.I.C.E. Awards	23 February 2023	Outstanding Achievement in Animation	Richard Oud, Paulus Bannink, Kim van Heest, Ismael Auray, Daniel Sipes	Nominated	
D.I.C.E. Awards	23 February 2023	Outstanding Achievement in Art Direction	Jan-Bart van Beek, Misja Baas, Roland Ijzermans, Roy Postma, Ben Sprout, Alex Zapata	Nominated	
D.I.C.E. Awards	23 February 2023	Outstanding Achievement in Character	Ashly Burch as Aloy, Ben McCaw, Jochen Willemsen, Ismael Auray & Daniel Sipes	Nominated	
D.I.C.E. Awards	23 February 2023	Outstanding Achievement in Game Direction	Mathijs de Jonge, Jan-Bart van Beek	Nominated	
D.I.C.E. Awards	23 February 2023	Outstanding Achievement in Original Music Composition	Lucas van Tol, Joris de Man, The Flight, Niels van der Leest, Oleksa Lozowchuk	Nominated	
D.I.C.E. Awards	23 February 2023	Outstanding Technical Achievement	Michiel van der Leeuw, Stefan Lauwers, Remco Straatman	Nominated	
Dutch Game Awards	6 October 2022	Best Game	Guerrilla/Sony Interactive Entertainment	Won	
Dutch Game Awards	6 October 2022	Best Art	Guerrilla/Sony Interactive Entertainment	Won	
Dutch Game Awards	6 October 2022	Best Audio	Guerrilla/Sony Interactive Entertainment	Won	
Dutch Game Awards	6 October 2022	Best Technology	Guerrilla/Sony Interactive Entertainment	Won	
Game Audio Network Guild Awards	23 March 2023	Best Original Song	In The Flood	Nominated	
Game Audio Network Guild Awards	23 March 2023	Best Voice Performance	Ashly Burch as Aloy	Won	
Game Audio Network Guild Awards	23 March 2023	Audio of the Year	Guerrilla/Sony Interactive Entertainment	Nominated	
Game Audio Network Guild Awards	23 March 2023	Best Cinematic and Cutscene Audio	Guerrilla/Sony Interactive Entertainment	Nominated	
Game Audio Network Guild Awards	23 March 2023	Best Ensemble Cast Performance	Guerrilla/Sony Interactive Entertainment	Won	
Game Audio Network Guild Awards	23 March 2023	Best Game Foley	Guerrilla/Sony Interactive Entertainment	Nominated	
Game Audio Network Guild Awards	23 March 2023	Best Game Trailer Audio	Guerrilla/Sony Interactive Entertainment	Nominated	
Game Audio Network Guild Awards	23 March 2023	Creative and Technical Achievement in Music	Guerrilla/Sony Interactive Entertainment	Nominated	
Game Audio Network Guild Awards	23 March 2023	Creative and Technical Achievement in Sound Design	Guerrilla/Sony Interactive Entertainment	Nominated	
Game Audio Network Guild Awards	23 March 2023	Dialogue of the Year	Guerrilla/Sony Interactive Entertainment	Nominated	
Game Audio Network Guild Awards	23 March 2023	Sound Design of the Year	Guerrilla/Sony Interactive Entertainment	Nominated	
Game Developers Choice Awards	22 March 2023	Game of the Year	Guerrilla/Sony Interactive Entertainment	Honorable Mention	
Game Developers Choice Awards	22 March 2023	Best Audio	Guerrilla/Sony Interactive Entertainment	Nominated	
Game Developers Choice Awards	22 March 2023	Innovation Award	Guerrilla/Sony Interactive Entertainment	Honorable Mention	
Game Developers Choice Awards	22 March 2023	Best Narrative	Guerrilla/Sony Interactive Entertainment	Honorable Mention	
Game Developers Choice Awards	22 March 2023	Best Technology	Guerrilla/Sony Interactive Entertainment	Nominated	
Game Developers Choice Awards	22 March 2023	Best Visual Art	Guerrilla/Sony Interactive Entertainment	Nominated	
Golden Joystick Awards	23 November 2021	Most Wanted Game	Guerrilla/Sony Interactive Entertainment	Nominated	
Golden Joystick Awards	22 November 2022	Ultimate Game of the Year	Guerrilla/Sony Interactive Entertainment	Nominated	
Golden Joystick Awards	22 November 2022	Best Storytelling	Guerrilla/Sony Interactive Entertainment	Won	
Golden Joystick Awards	22 November 2022	Best Visual Design	Guerrilla/Sony Interactive Entertainment	Nominated	
Golden Joystick Awards	22 November 2022	PlayStation Game of the Year	Guerrilla/Sony Interactive Entertainment	Nominated	
Golden Joystick Awards	22 November 2022	Best Performer	Angela Bassett as Regalla	Nominated	
Golden Reel Awards	26 February 2023	Outstanding Achievement in Music Editing – Game Music	Bastian Seelbach, Lucas van Tol, Bastiaan van Bentum	Nominated	
Golden Reel Awards	26 February 2023	Outstanding Achievement in Sound Editing – Game Dialogue / ADR	Jochen Willemsen, Erik Schuring, Juan Manuel Delfin, Vincent van Rooijen, Nick van Noort, Sander Houtman, Nick Gratwick	Nominated	
Golden Reel Awards	26 February 2023	Outstanding Achievement in Sound Editing – Game Effects / Foley	Guerrilla Game Effects Team (Note: Nominees include: Bastian Seelbach, Anton Woldhek, Pinar Temiz, Lewis James, Arjen Schut, Ramon Kerstens, Casey Slocum, Dennis Bestafka, Safar Bake, Jon Rook, Justin E. Bell, Aaron Sanchez, Eilam Hoffman, George Vlad, Ash Read, Lovisa Bergdahl, Jacopo Consonni, Gijs Driesenaar, Robert Castro, Andres Herrera, Maria Rascon, TJ Schauer, David Goll, Lewis Everest, Lewis Barn, Fabio Liutina, Robert Kellough MPSE, Graham Donnelly, David Whitehead MPSE, Michelle Child, Tobias Poppe, Jonathan Howe, Andreas Varga, Nick van Kleef, Ruben Bergshoeff, Ben Pantelis, Graham Donnelly, Mark Bailey, Shane Rees, Mauricio Nicoli, Emmanuel Gayosso, Tim McCann, Blake Collins, Joanna Fang, Rustam Gimadiyev, Bogdan Zavarzin, David C Hughes, Stephano Sanchinelli, Jesse Barden, Alexis Mondragon, Patrick Lee, Wen Du.)	Nominated	
Ivor Novello Awards	18 May 2023	Best Original Video Game Score	Joris de Man, Oleksa Lozowchuk and The Flight	Nominated	
Japan Game Awards	15 September 2022	Award for Excellence	Guerrilla/Sony Interactive Entertainment	Won	
Nebula Awards	14 May 2023	Best Game Writing	Ben McCaw, Anna Kitain	Nominated	
New York Game Awards	17 January 2023	Great White Way Award for Best Acting in a Game	Ashly Burch as Aloy	Nominated	
New York Game Awards	17 January 2023	Statue of Liberty Award for Best World	Guerrilla/Sony Interactive Entertainment	Nominated	
New York Game Awards	17 January 2023	Tin Pan Alley Award for Best Music in a Game	Guerrilla/Sony Interactive Entertainment	Nominated	
The Game Awards	10 December 2020	Most Anticipated Game	Guerrilla/Sony Interactive Entertainment	Nominated	
The Game Awards	9 December 2021	Most Anticipated Game	Guerrilla/Sony Interactive Entertainment	Nominated	
The Game Awards	8 December 2022	Game of the Year	Guerrilla/Sony Interactive Entertainment	Nominated	
The Game Awards	8 December 2022	Best Game Direction	Guerrilla/Sony Interactive Entertainment	Nominated	
The Game Awards	8 December 2022	Best Narrative	Guerrilla/Sony Interactive Entertainment	Nominated	
The Game Awards	8 December 2022	Best Art Direction	Guerrilla/Sony Interactive Entertainment	Nominated	
The Game Awards	8 December 2022	Best Audio Design	Guerrilla/Sony Interactive Entertainment	Nominated	
The Game Awards	8 December 2022	Best Action/Adventure Game	Guerrilla/Sony Interactive Entertainment	Nominated	
The Game Awards	8 December 2022	Best Performance	Ashly Burch as Aloy	Nominated	
The Steam Awards	31 December 2024	Best Soundtrack	Guerrilla/Sony Interactive Entertainment	Nominated	
Webby Awards	15 May 2023	Best Game Design	Guerrilla/Sony Interactive Entertainment	Nominated	
Webby Awards	15 May 2023	Technical Achievement	Guerrilla/Sony Interactive Entertainment	Nominated	

== Sequel ==
In April 2023, developer Guerrilla Games confirmed plans about "expanding the world of Horizon with Aloy's next adventure", hinting that a possible direct sequel to Forbidden West is likely to be in development.
