= Aloy =

Fictional character in Horizon video games

- Horizon character
- Aloy as she appears in Horizon Zero Dawn
- First game: Horizon Zero Dawn (2017)
- Voiced by: Ashly Burch; Laura Van Tol (infant); Ava Potter (child)

In-universe information
- Family: Rost (guardian, deceased); Beta (sister / genetic twin)
- Tribe: Nora

Aloy (/ˈeɪlɔɪ/ AY-loy) is a fictional character and the protagonist of the Horizon video game franchise, developed by Guerrilla Games. She first appears in Horizon Zero Dawn (2017) and returns in its sequel, Horizon Forbidden West (2022). The narrative of the games takes place in a post-apocalyptic 31st-century United States. Aloy is a skilled huntress who uses tactical intelligence and tribal weaponry to survive in a world that has been reclaimed by nature and overrun by hostile machines. She is raised as an outcast and embarks on a journey to discover her origins; she learns she is a genetic clone of 21st-century scientist Dr. Elisabet Sobeck, created by a benevolent artificial intelligence to restore Earth's failing terraforming systems and prevent a second mass extinction. Throughout the series, she grows from an isolated outcast, pressured to live up to Sobeck's legacy, into a leader who embraces a found family, including her clone sister Beta.

Guerrilla conceived Aloy as a strong, capable female lead to intentionally avoid what the studio viewed as oversexualised tropes common in the video game industry. Dutch actress Hannah Hoekstra provided the physical model for her visual design, while she is voiced by American actress Ashly Burch. Focusing the narrative on a female lead marked a departure from the masculine tone of the studio's previous Killzone franchise. Aloy has also appeared in virtual reality and Lego spin-offs, Horizon Call of the Mountain and Lego Horizon Adventures, respectively. She has been featured in crossover events for titles including Fortnite (2017) and Genshin Impact (2020).

Reviewers have praised Aloy's emotional drive and evolution from an isolated outcast into an independent leader. Critics also said that Burch's vocal performance made this transition feel authentic. Criticism of Aloy has been directed at her occasional abrasive demeanour and a tendency for her in-game dialogue to prematurely spoil environmental puzzles. The character has also drawn scholarly analysis regarding themes of ecofeminism and posthumanism associated with her narrative.

== Concept and design ==
The concept of Aloy dates back to 2010 when Guerrilla Games art director Jan-Bart van Beek pitched an early idea for a game featuring a female protagonist in a post-apocalyptic world reclaimed by nature and robotic dinosaurs. Initial designs equipped her with a rifle, but the developers substituted tribal weaponry, specifically a bow, because high-tech gunfire clashed with the natural setting of Horizon Zero Dawn (2017). The studio always envisioned the game as starring a strong female character, with game director Mathijs de Jonge revealing that Sarah Connor from Terminator, Ellen Ripley from Alien, and Ygritte from Game of Thrones (2011–2019) were initial influences. Sony anticipated that a female lead might pose a commercial risk due to industry biases at the time regarding female protagonists, so they conducted market testing before approving the character. De Jonge stated that centring the narrative heroism on femininity was a creative shift away from the masculine tone of the studio's previous Killzone franchise.

=== Characterisation and casting ===
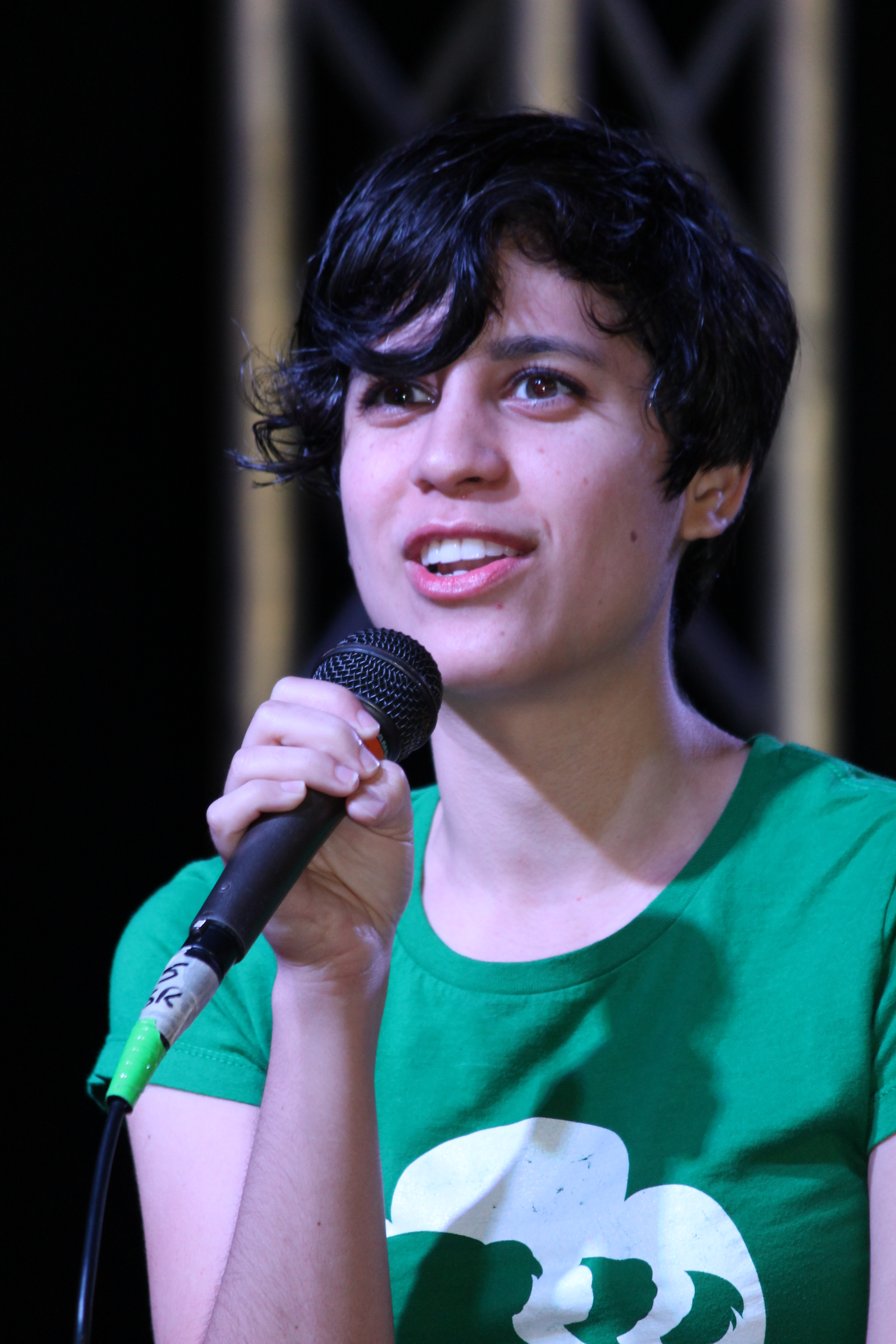
Ashly Burch (pictured in 2014) portrays Aloy.

Aloy was written with ingrained survival instincts and a gritty personality, viewing machines with pragmatism. The writers characterised her with a direct and occasionally aggressive approach to resolving issues. De Jonge explained that Aloy was conceived as one of the game's three foundational pillars. She needed to contrast against the other two, which were the natural environments and the machines. This necessitated her agile and fluid combat mechanics. While Sony's initial market testing proved that players were excited about a female lead, the tests also revealed that Aloy's early design was perceived as too young and possessing a "Disney Princess, miss-perfect quality" that players found unbelievable for a machine hunter. The team then spent two years on her concept art and brought in freelance artists to help redesign her to look "older, tougher, [and] louder". Studio co-founder Hermen Hulst stated that her clothing and physical appearance were designed for functionality. According to Hulst, the team deliberately avoided what they viewed as an industry trend of overly sexualising female characters, which they believed would detract from the game's core themes. The developers spent considerable time refining her hairstyle so she would remain instantly recognisable regardless of the armour she wore. Her red hair and tribal braids were designed to avoid unnecessary fashion flourishes.

Guerrilla based Aloy's facial likeness on Dutch actress Hannah Hoekstra, and she is voiced by American actress Ashly Burch, with Laura Van Tol and Ava Potter providing her vocal performances as an infant and a child in Zero Dawn, respectively. Narrative director John Gonzalez explained that Burch was cast because she balanced the three qualities required for the character: toughness, articulate wit, and an underlying vulnerability stemming from her childhood. Actress Peggy Vrijens performed the more action-heavy aspects of Aloy's motion capture. Burch did full body motion capture for The Frozen Wilds (2017). She studied early in-game footage to accurately replicate Aloy's walking and running animations, so she could ensure that her physical performance matched the established movements. Burch described her vocal recording sessions as intensely physical, frequently pantomiming taking elemental damage to generate combat sounds. Guerrilla's audio team recorded dynamic sound for her movements. Senior sound designer Lucas van Tol explained that Aloy's footsteps were designed to change in weight and texture depending on the type of armour equipped. The team had to record a separate set of audio rhythms to match the pacing of the child motion capture actress in Zero Dawn.

=== Narrative integration ===
When Gonzalez joined the team for Zero Dawn, he helped flesh out Aloy's story and psychology. Gonzalez originally wanted Aloy to discover her Focus, an ancient augmented reality device, as an adult, but the design team pushed for her to find it as a child. Gonzalez admitted this change was ultimately beneficial, as it allowed them to show her early emotional connection to ancient recordings, which wove her personal growth directly into the story of the ancient world. Burch's vocal performance influenced Gonzalez's writing, and she treated her role as a long-term creative partnership. During recording sessions, she offered input on the script and worked closely with the director to determine whether specific lines and reactions aligned with Aloy's established personality. The team depicted her humanity by implementing a dialogue system that allowed the player to shape the nuances of her personality during narrative moments. The player could choose whether she reacts compassionately, insightfully, or confrontationally. The development team aimed for her to organically grow from a figure of the lowest social standing into the saviour of the region. Her behaviour and worldview were influenced by her status as a motherless outcast at birth. Gonzalez explained this early trauma created a deep compassion for others and drove her curiosity about her origins, providing a narrative justification for her willingness to assist non-player characters (NPCs) during side quests.

=== Evolution in Forbidden West ===
Aloy's design and game mechanics evolved to reflect her growth and experience in Horizon Forbidden West (2022). Lead character artist Bastien Ramisse explained that the PlayStation 5's advanced hardware allowed the team to increase the polygon density and skeletal joints of her character model. This enabled enhanced facial capture accuracy and realistic surface details, down to the vellus hair visible on her skin. Lead combat designer Dennis Zopfi stated that her mechanics were built around traits like being smart, fast, agile, precise, and resourceful. The team blended melee and ranged combat to demonstrate that she does not rely on brute force, and updated her animations to show she is more comfortable traversing the environment. New tools included a grappling hook and a glider, which were introduced to increase her vertical mobility. Senior writer Annie Kitain explained that the pressure Aloy faced to live up to Elisabet Sobeck's legacy was a significant part of her character arc, which caused her to push her friends away, as she felt she had to accomplish her tasks alone. Narrative director Ben McCaw said that over the course of the game, her narrative focused on learning to accept help and integrate into society, and realising the world's people were worth saving. Aloy's evolving relationship with her clone sister Beta was described by the development team as the emotional core of the game's story and was considered the most difficult aspect to write. The writers created Beta as a "dark mirror" of Aloy to embody her internal conflicts about wanting to connect with others while still feeling isolated. Beta was originally envisioned as an optimistic character before being rewritten as sullen and withdrawn to better fit the emotional tone of the story.

In the 2023 expansion Horizon Forbidden West: Burning Shores (2023), McCaw explained that the team wanted to push Aloy beyond the trauma of her outcast childhood and explore her capacity for vulnerability and love. This narrative arc culminates in her meeting the Quen warrior Seyka, a character designed to be Aloy's equal. Equipping Seyka with a Focus mirrored Aloy's past, which allowed Aloy to identify with her. This led to an optional dialogue choice where the player determines whether Aloy kisses Seyka. McCaw and Kitain explained that regardless of whether the player accepts or rejects the romance, the choice remains valid to Aloy's character and reflects her ongoing struggles with social intimacy and the immense weight of her mission.

=== Spin-off adaptations ===
In the virtual reality title Horizon Call of the Mountain (2023), Aloy appears as an NPC encountered by the protagonist, Ryas. McCaw explained that because the game was built specifically for virtual reality, the team felt they needed a new protagonist whose skill set offered a viewpoint to experience the vertical scale of the world. The 2024 spin-off Lego Horizon Adventures reimagines her for a younger, family-friendly audience. Frédéric Andre, creative lead at The Lego Group, explained that Aloy's in-game model and physical minifigure feature a more expressive face to capture the lighthearted and playful tone of the adaptation, which contrasted with her typically more serious demeanour.

=== Musical theme ===
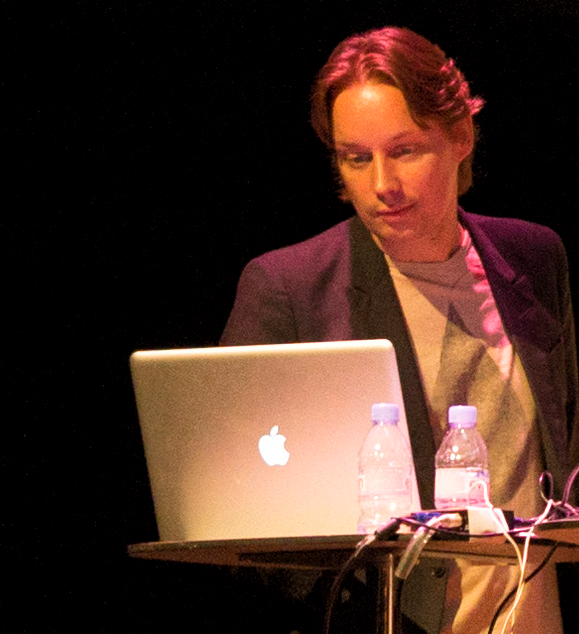
Joris de Man (pictured in 2013) used minimalistic instrumentation to evoke Aloy's isolated upbringing.

Aloy's journey is represented by "Aloy's Theme", a recurring motif featuring the lyricless vocals of singer Julie Elven. When crafting the theme, composer Joris de Man was instructed by the developers to avoid traditional sci-fi tropes; they specifically requested an "anti-blockbuster" sound for Aloy that was intimate and organic. The theme was originally composed for Zero Dawn's E3 2015 trailer and was initially used as a placeholder for the main menu; however, positive audience response led the team to keep it permanently. The instrumentation was kept minimalistic. Sparse arrangements of analogue synthesisers, cellos, and contrabass flutes were meant to evoke Aloy's isolated upbringing as an outcast and her underlying loneliness. Elven was originally recommended to the team by composer Ian Livingstone. At the end of one of Livingstone's recording sessions, de Man asked Elven to sing a short, minute-and-a-half phrase he had written. The musical style for Aloy relied on soloistic performances and improvisations. Elven's vocalisation became Aloy's "musical voice". Throughout Zero Dawn, the composition team used Elven's vocals during cutscenes to underscore the most emotional and pivotal moments of Aloy's inner journey.

For Forbidden West, the musical focus shifted to reflect Aloy's growth from a frustrated outcast to a character with clear purpose. Composers sought to further evolve her musical presence, with Niels van der Leest ensuring his contributions to the score were written "through the eyes of Aloy" to reflect the burden of her new mission. The score introduced vocal duets between Elven and Melissa R. Kaplan to represent Aloy's interactions with a new significant character; in these duets, Elven's voice was used to signify Aloy's strength and persistence, which contrasted with the vulnerability of her companion. The vocal track "In the Flood", originally written by Lovisa Bergdahl and co-produced with Oleksa Lozowchuk, features vocals by Ariana Gillis. The developers chose it for the game's opening title sequence because they felt it perfectly fit the tone of the introduction, which features Aloy galloping into the West.

== Appearances ==
=== Video games ===
Zero Dawn is set in a post-apocalyptic 31st-century United States. Aloy is an outcast of the Nora tribe and is raised in the wilderness by her surrogate father, Rost. Because she is shunned from birth for lacking a mother, young Aloy is determined to uncover her origins. As a child, she discovers an ancient augmented reality device called a Focus that reveals the ruined past. When she is a teenager, Aloy wins the Proving, a coming-of-age competition granting her tribal acceptance, but a cult of machine worshippers known as the Eclipse attacks the ceremony. Their leader, Helis, targets Aloy because she physically resembles a 21st-century scientist named Dr. Elisabet Sobeck. Rost then sacrifices himself to save her. After the Nora elders declare her a Seeker, a title granting her permission to leave their sacred lands, Aloy forms a reluctant alliance with a mysterious researcher named Sylens. She learns that she is a genetic clone of Sobeck, created by GAIA—the artificial intelligence (AI) governing Project Zero Dawn, an autonomous terraforming system that restored life on Earth after self-replicating military robots destroyed it. GAIA cloned Sobeck so Aloy could use her genetic signature to access restricted facilities and reboot the system. This is necessary to stop a rogue sub-function named HADES from causing a second mass extinction. While in Meridian, Aloy helps a huntress named Talanah overthrow the corrupt leadership of the local Hunters Lodge, a guild of machine hunters. Aloy defends Meridian from the Eclipse and secures the region by using a master override to purge HADES.

In The Frozen Wilds, Aloy detours north into the Cut, the ruins of Yellowstone National Park, to help the Banuk, a nomadic tribe of survlists. She investigates rumours of a Daemon, a mysterious anomaly corrupting local machines. She teams up with the local chieftain Aratak and his sister, the shaman Ourea, to stop the Daemon. They discover the Daemon is HEPHAESTUS, another rogue GAIA sub-function. HEPHAESTUS has taken over an ancient facility and enslaved CYAN, an AI designed by the ancient humans to prevent the Yellowstone Caldera from erupting. The trio infiltrates the facility's core, and Ourea sacrifices herself to complete an override. Aloy frees CYAN and halts HEPHAESTUS, but the rogue sub-function escapes into the global network.

Forbidden West takes place six months later. Aloy travels to the uncharted western coast of the United States to find a working backup of GAIA. She wants to use GAIA to reverse a toxic red blight and supercell storms that are degrading the biosphere. Aloy initially attempts to complete the mission alone, but she soon becomes entangled in a tribal civil war between the Tenakth Chief Hekarro and the rebel leader Regalla. She also clashes with Far Zenith. The Zeniths are a group of immortal billionaires who fled Earth during the apocalypse, and they have returned to claim GAIA for themselves using impenetrable energy shields. Aloy establishes a base of operations and forms a coalition of allies from various tribes. These include her friends Varl and Erend, alongside new allies Zo, Kotallo, and Alva. The group rescues Beta, a younger clone of Sobeck created by the Zeniths, and Aloy accepts her as a sister. A Zenith enforcer murders Varl, and Aloy leads her allies in an assault on the Zenith base. She reluctantly collaborates with Sylens and unleashes HEPHAESTUS into the Zenith machine-printing matrix to bypass their shields. They defeat the Zeniths, but they discover the billionaires only returned to Earth to flee a highly advanced gestalt intelligence called Nemesis. Nemesis is now on its way to Earth to destroy the planet. Aloy chooses to remain on Earth and work with her allies to prepare for its arrival.

In Burning Shores, Sylens sends Aloy to the volcanic archipelago of Los Angeles to track down Walter Londra, the final surviving Zenith. Aloy partners with Seyka, a Quen marine searching for her missing sister and crewmates. They discover that Londra has brainwashed the missing Quen into a cult. He plans to use them as a crew to flee Earth, but his ship's launch will irradiate the entire region. Aloy and Seyka infiltrate Londra's facility and rescue the captives. Londra reactivates a Horus, a large ancient war machine, to kill them, but the pair destroy it, and Aloy kills Londra. She recovers data from his base that gives Sylens a lead on how to defeat Nemesis. Afterwards, the player is presented with a dialogue choice to determine the outcome of Aloy and Seyka's relationship. If the player selects the "Heart" option, Aloy reciprocates Seyka's feelings, and the two share a kiss.

Aloy is an NPC in Call of the Mountain and the primary playable character in the Zero Dawn retelling Lego Horizon Adventures. She also makes cameo appearances in other games. She is featured as a playable character in the PlayStation 4 version of Monster Hunter: World (2018), and appears in Astro's Playroom (2020) and Astro Bot (2024). The latter features a level based on Horizon. Aloy appears in Fortnite Battle Royale (2017) on 15 April 2021 for the Chapter 2, Season 6 "Primal" event. In September 2021, she was released as a free character for PS4 and PS5 players of Genshin Impact (2020), voiced by Giselle Fernandez, with a release on other platforms following in October. In December 2021, Aloy became an unlockable costume in Fall Guys (2020) during a limited-time event.

=== Comics ===
Aloy also appears in the Horizon Zero Dawn comic book series published by Titan Comics. In the first volume, The Sunhawk (2020), she makes a supporting appearance. After Aloy leaves Meridian, Talanah ventures into the wilderness to find her. Talanah meets Amadis and battles a new machine known as a Clawstrider. Aloy returns to a co-starring role in the second volume, Liberation (2021–2022), which is set during the events of the first game. She helps Erend track Korl, an accomplice in the murder of Erend's sister, Ersa. While they fight machines, Erend recounts the history of the "Liberation of Meridian", and how Ersa and the Oseram vanguard helped overthrow the Mad Sun-King Jiran.

== Reception ==
=== Critical response ===
Aloy has received largely positive reception from critics. Reviewers praised her emotional drive, as well as her clever and pragmatic personality, traits that fuel her quest to discover her origins. Writing for The Guardian, Keith Stuart hat Aloy's journey is driven by "intellectual curiosity" rather than traditional heroic obligation, as her fascination with ancient technology grounds the narrative. Peter Tieryas of Kotaku wrote that optional mechanics, like visiting Rost's grave, humanised her. Conversely, Malindy Hetfeld of Polygon argued that Aloy's "flawless", superhero-like qualities occasionally made her less relatable than the supporting female cast. Critics commended the franchise's subversion of traditional gender roles; Javy Gwaltney of Game Informer praised Aloy as a feminist heroine whose outsider perspective allows her to challenge her world's bigotry and tribalism. Polygon named her one of the best characters of the 2010s and praised her refusal to let a tribal society dictate her life. In the years following her debut, several publications included Aloy on lists of notable video game characters, including PC Gamer and TheGamer. GamesRadar+ named her one of gaming's most inspirational female characters, and while Sammy Barker of Push Square compared her to action heroines like Lara Croft and Katniss Everdeen, other reviewers felt that she evolves this archetype through her reliance on tactical intelligence and survival skills.

Sam Loveridge of GamesRadar+ praised her narrative arc for focusing on self-discovery and a "found family" of allies; however, her initially distant attitude towards those companions polarised several reviewers. Mike Minotti of VentureBeat argued that her reluctance to accept help could sometimes feel "illogically extreme"; GameSpot's Phil Hornshaw criticised her as "kind of dull" and prone to "somberly wandering around"; and Malindy Hetfield of Eurogamer found her abrasive demeanour grating. Aloy's relationship with her clone sister, Beta, also drew commentary; reviewers argued that her initial lack of empathy towards Beta's trauma illustrated the friction between their shared genetics and different upbringings. In Burning Shores, reviewers praised the traditionally stoic huntress for displaying vulnerability and a softening dynamic when given the option to share a player-determined romantic kiss with Seyka. The inclusion of the optional same-sex romance subjected the franchise to a review bombing campaign on Metacritic. Gaming outlets criticised the backlash: PC Gamer's Fraser Brown explicitly described the campaign as homophobic; Hirun Cryer of GamesRadar+ condemned users for railing against LGBTQ+ themes; and Eurogamer's Victoria Phillips Kennedy drew attention to the anti-gay rhetoric driving the negative scores. LGBTQ+ media advocacy group GLAAD praised the expansion for explicitly confirming Aloy's queer identity and stated that it provided a definitive answer to her sexuality and avoided the common video game trope of leaving LGBTQ+ representation ambiguous.

Ashly Burch's voice acting for Aloy has been well received, with critics praising her for bringing humanity, confidence, and emotional depth to the role. Some early reviews of Zero Dawn felt that the facial animations were stiff and detracted from the performance, though journalists acknowledged these issues were resolved in Forbidden West and the 2024 remastered edition. Aloy's in-game dialogue drew complaints as excessive hand-holding, since her habit of talking to herself often spoiled puzzle solutions.

Regarding her visual design, Hayley Williams of Kotaku praised Aloy's "practical, unsexualised design" and how her outfits avoided the questionable choices common for female video game characters. Before the launch of Forbidden West, the character's updated model, which included natural skin textures and vellus hair, drew backlash from a subset of users who argued that she looked too masculine. TheGamer criticised these complaints and argued that Aloy's sun-weathered appearance successfully rejected the male gaze. Other outlets echoed this sentiment and praised the studio for presenting realistic female features. When the character appeared in the comedic spin-off Lego Horizon Adventures, reviewers found the exaggerated, lighter take on her usually serious personality endearing, a shift complemented by a more comedic vocal performance from Burch.

=== Thematic analysis ===
Scholars have analysed Aloy's characterisation and narrative arc through the lenses of ecofeminism, posthumanism, and gender studies. Lauren Woolbright identified Aloy as a distinctly ecofeminist protagonist; her quest pits nature against out-of-control technology and challenges the exploitation of Earth as property. Woolbright wrote that Aloy rejects patriarchal heroic tropes and is guided by an environmental ethics of care that seeks to restore balance to the ecosystem. Natalie J. Swain stated that the game mechanics reject traditional power structures; the franchise uses standpoint theory by forcing the player to inhabit the worldview of a social outcast. Swain argued this marginalised perspective changes the audience's social awareness.

Posthumanist analyses of the character focus on the biology-technology intersection. Jesús Fernández-Caro called Aloy a "feminine posthuman" because her origin as a clone in a matriarchal society connects biology and technology. Ashley Lanni wrote that her relationship with knowledge changes over the series. She initially hoards data, but she later shares her technology to educate her allies. Andrei Nae and Eirini Bourontzi argued that Aloy's struggle against the immortal Far Zeniths is a rejection of technological elitism and corporate transhumanism.

Aloy's origin as a clone affects traditional motherhood within the franchise's matriarchal setting. Loveridge compared Aloy's quest to uncover her genetic origins to the real-world experiences of adopted children searching for their birth parents. Melissa L. Allen wrote that the franchise challenges gender expectations by resisting amatonormativity, which is the assumption that a central romance is necessary for a fulfilling life. This design choice requires the player to first engage with Aloy's non-traditional role as an outsider. Jasmyn Connell examined how fans explored Aloy's queer identity for years through virtual photography before Aloy's romance with Seyka. Connell described Aloy's online persona as a collaborative assemblage co-curated by the developers and the community.

Nae and Bourontzi wrote that the games' core mechanics actively force Aloy into the role of a "colonial entrepreneur". They asserted that her Focus superimposes a capitalist colonial gaze that reduces the ecosystem to loot and exchange value. This requires her to uphold a Western scientific worldview to "save" the Earth at the expense of non-Western, indigenous belief systems. Indigenous game developers criticised these colonial narratives, arguing the world forces Aloy to interact with tribes based on stereotypical "future primitivism". Holly Green of The A.V. Club wrote that this cultural power imbalance pushes Aloy into the white saviour trope. As an outsider with superior technological knowledge, she routinely solves the spiritual conflicts of these societies. Conversely, Ian Faith argued that Aloy's hunting represents a healthy "hybrid ecology" because she harvests components for cultural connection and survival instead of capitalist exploitation.

=== Accolades ===
Ashly Burch won "Best Gaming Performance" and "Breakout Performance" at the Golden Joystick Awards for her performance as Aloy in Zero Dawn, and received a nomination for "Performer" at the British Academy Games Awards. She also earned nominations for "Best Performance" at The Game Awards for both Zero Dawn and Forbidden West. The Academy of Interactive Arts & Sciences nominated the character twice for "Outstanding Achievement in Character" at the D.I.C.E. Awards across both mainline games. For her work in Forbidden West, Burch received an additional nomination for "Best Acting in a Game" at the New York Game Awards, and won "Best Voice Performance" at the Game Audio Network Guild Awards.

=== Cultural impact and merchandise ===
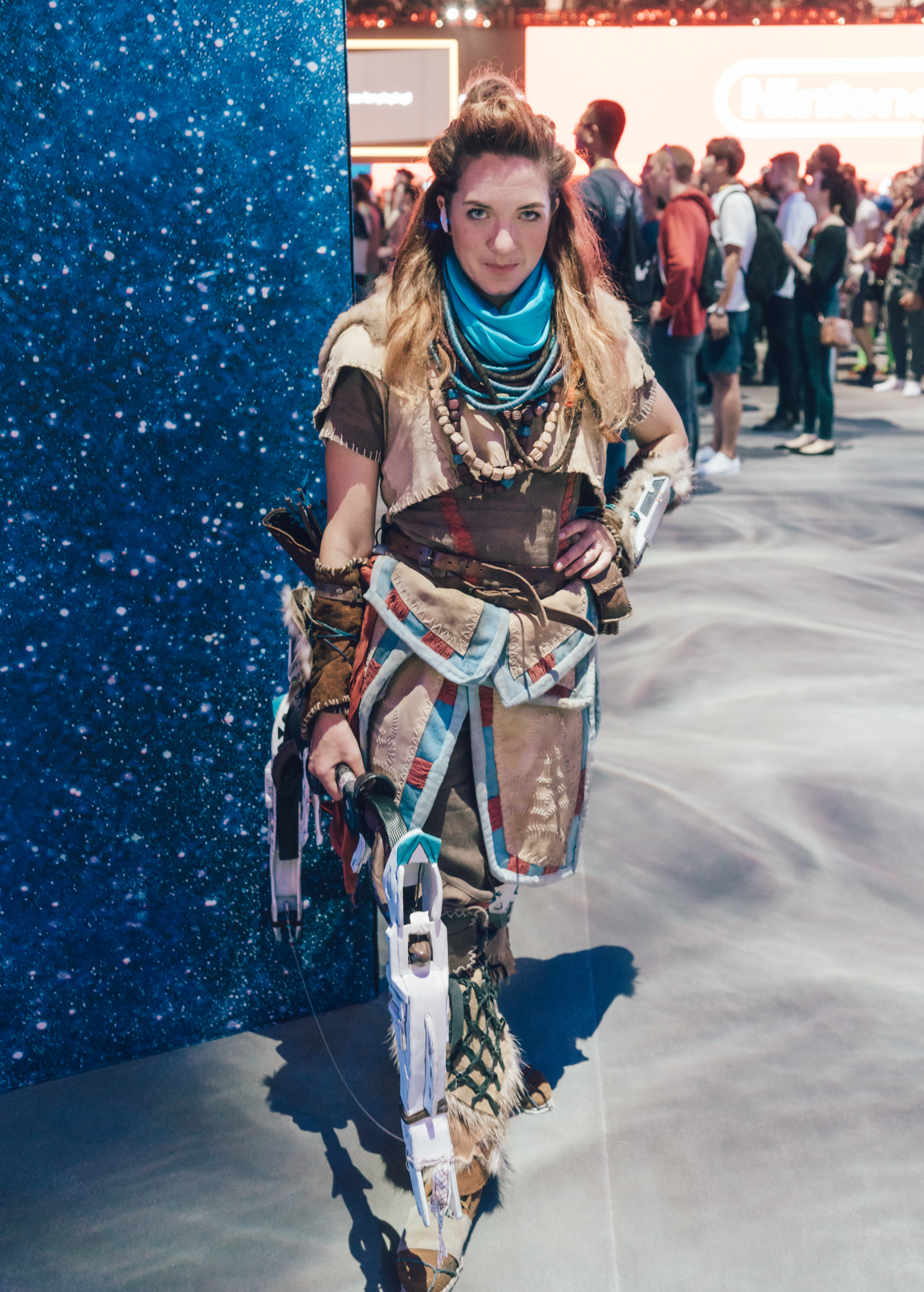
An Aloy cosplayer at E3 2018

Following Aloy's reveal at E3 2015, she inspired a cosplay presence prior to the game's release. In response to this early interest, Guerrilla released a series of official cosplay guides to support the community actively. A study by Deakin University found that playing as Aloy encouraged empathy among a predominantly male player base, which successfully disrupted traditional barriers of cross-gender play. Coinciding with the launch of Zero Dawn, a "Collector's Edition" was released and featured a 9-inch statue of Aloy sculpted by Gentle Giant. That same year, she was featured as a plush toy in the PlayStation Stubbins line, while Funko launched a series of Pop! figurines that later expanded with a new variant in 2020. Prime 1 Studio also produced a 1:4 scale statue of her.

Both the Collector's and Regalla Editions of Forbidden West included statues of Aloy. Dark Horse released a 1:9 scale statue of her riding a Clawstrider. They also released a 1:8 scale PVC figure. Good Smile Company released a stylised Nendoroid figure, while Spin Master included her in their "The Shapes Collection" line of action figures in 2024. She appears as a minifigure in multiple Lego sets, which include a 2022 Tallneck build and a 2025 set tied to Lego Horizon Adventures. In late 2025, Wizards of the Coast featured her in a Magic: The Gathering Secret Lair Drop titled "Into the Forbidden West", which included an alternate-art reskin of "Farseek" and a mechanically unique legendary creature card named "Aloy, Savior of Meridian".
